= Capture of HMS Boxer =

Sea battle during the War of 1812

Coordinates: 43.8150°N 69.4088°W

- Part of the War of 1812
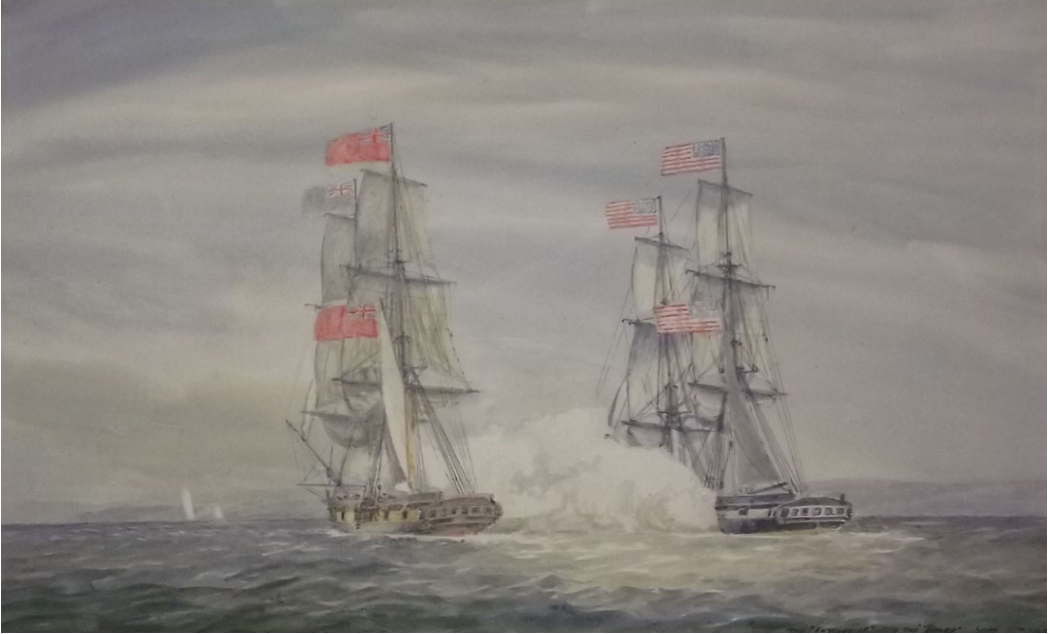
Date	5 September 1813
Location	Off Pemaquid Point, Atlantic Ocean
Result	American victory

Belligerents
United States	United Kingdom

Commanders and leaders
William Ward Burrows II †	Samuel Blyth †

Strength
1 brig	1 gun-brig

Casualties and losses
Unknown killed or wounded	Unknown killed or wounded; 1 gun-brig captured captured

The capture of HMS Boxer occurred on 5 September 1813 was off Pemaquid Point, Maine, during the War of 1812. The United States Navy brig USS Enterprise, under Lieutenant William Ward Burrows II, captured the British gun-brig HMS Boxer under Commander Samuel Blyth. Constructed as a schooner in Maryland in 1799, Enterprise was rebuilt as a brig prior to the war. She met an inglorious end, wrecking in the West Indies in 1823. However, her name carried on. A number of following U.S. Navy warships bore the name. The Boxer was auctioned for $9,775 to benefit her captors, and she served as a local merchantman for some years.

== Battle ==
On 5 September 1813, USS Enterprise with fourteen 18-pound carronades and two 9-pound long guns and 102 men sighted HMS Boxer with twelve 18-pound carronades and two 6-pound long guns and 66 men off Pemaquid Point, Maine. After six hours of maneuvering, the antagonists finally engaged. Commander Blyth prepared for a fight to the finish. He ordered a Union Jack nailed to the foremast and two on the mainmast. In Enterprise, Burrows demonstrated similar resolve. He moved one of his two long 9-pounders from the bow to a stern port, and tradition indicates he declared: "We are going to fight both ends and both sides of this ship as long as the ends and the sides hold together." When the firing commenced, the ships were eight miles southeast of Seguin. When it ended, according to William Barnes, a member of the American crew and later a respected mariner from Woolwich, the ships were "some four or five miles east from Pemaquid point, four miles southwest of East Egg Rock . . . and about seven miles west north west of Monhegan." Boxer was in the area, having for a fee escorted an American merchantman with Swedish papers from New Brunswick to the Kennebec River.

Within half pistol shot, the two brigs opened fire. "Great God, what shots!" exclaimed Blyth an instant before being killed during the initial fusillades. Moments later, while helping his crew run out a carronade, a musket ball tore into Burrow's thigh. He fell to the deck mortally wounded, but refused to be carried below. The fierce contest ended in 30 minutes. Command of Enterprise devolved to Lieutenant Edward McCall and Captain Samuel Drinkwater, while Lieutenant David McGrery had assumed command of the battered Boxer. Towards the end, McGrery described his ship as a complete wreck with three feet of water in the hold. The flags on the mainmast were shot away, but the Englishman's colors remained nailed to the foremast; "but his tongue was not fastened and he called for quarters. . .." The dying Lieutenant Burrows declined to accept Commander Blyth's sword, directing it be sent to the family of the dead British captain. "I am satisfied, I die contented," Lieutenant Burrows exclaimed. McCall returned to Portland to the southwest with the two ships and the casualties.

An American court-martial charged Sailing Master William Harper and Isaac Bowman, captain's clerk, with cowardice. Captain Isaac Hull dismissed the Bowman complaint, and the court acquitted Harper. However, at Bermuda, a British court martial found its acting master's mate and three seamen "through cowardice, negligence, or disaffection" deserted their quarters during the action.

== Aftermath ==
Newspapers in the United States rejoiced in "another brilliant naval victory." After two days of planning, authorities conducted an impressive state funeral for the two commanders, and they rest side by side in Portland's Eastern Cemetery. Next to them is the comparable grave of Lieutenant Kervin Waters, who suffered mortal wounds as a midshipman during the battle but lived for two more years.

== Quotation ==
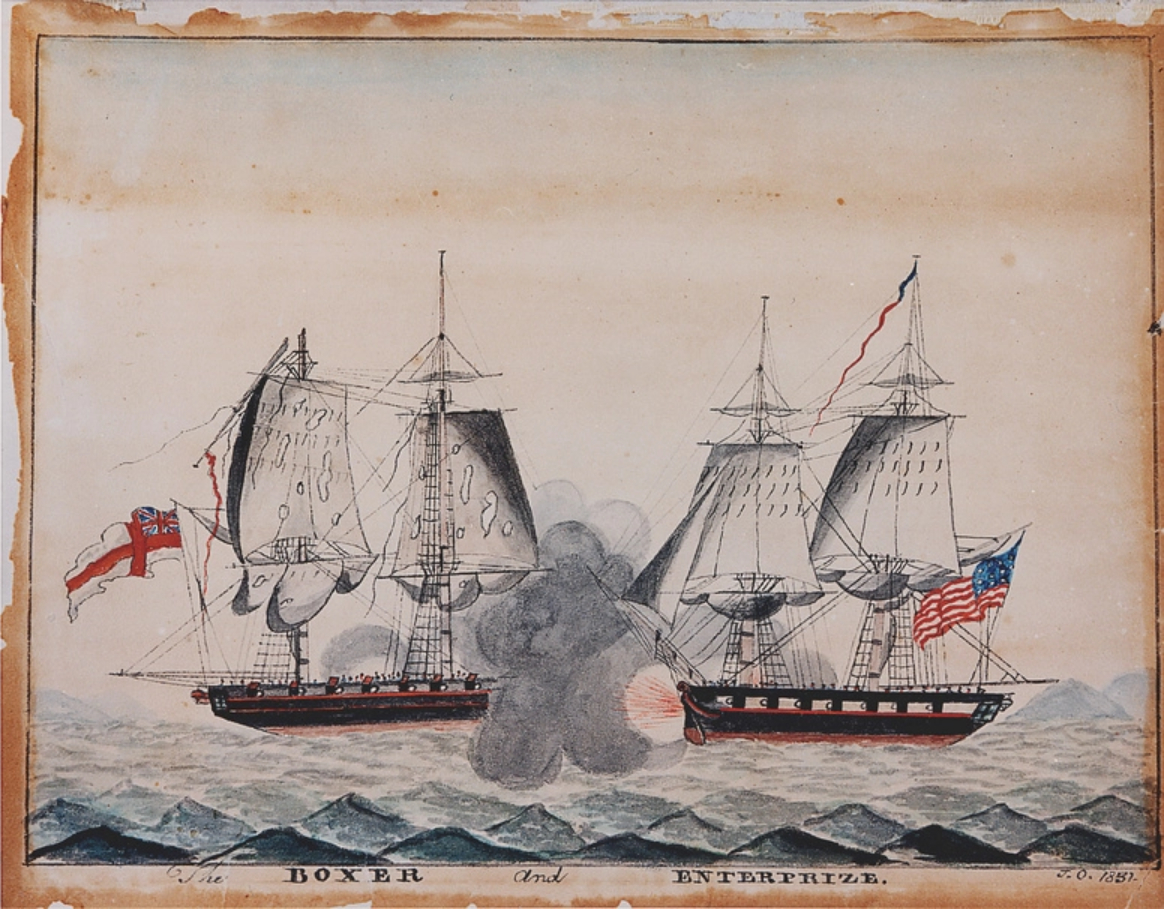
Picture of the event

" The captain of HMS Boxer, Commander Samuel Blyth, was killed early in the action by a cannon ball; had he lived he might have defended his ship more desperately, but it is not probable with more success. He was an officer of distinguished merit; having received a sword from government for his good conduct under Sir James L. Yeo, in the capture of Cayenne. Blyth was also one of the pall-bearers of our lamented James Lawrence, when buried at Halifax, Nova Scotia. It was his fate now to receive like courtesy at the hands of his enemy. His remains, in company with those of the brave Burrows, were brought to Portland, where they were interred with military honours in Eastern Cemetery. It was a striking and affecting sight, to behold two gallant commanders, who had lately been arrayed in deadly hostility against each other, descending into one quiet grave, there to mingle their dust peacefully together. "

This battle was referenced by Henry Wadsworth Longfellow in his poem "My Lost Youth":

"I remember the sea-fight far away,
How it thundered o'er the tide!
And the dead captains, as they lay
In their graves, o'erlooking the tranquil bay
Where they in battle died.
And the sound of that mournful song
Goes through me with a thrill:
"A boy's will is the wind's will,
And the thoughts of youth are long, long thoughts."
