= Samuel Drinkwater =

- Born: February 24, 1742; North Yarmouth, Province of Massachusetts
- Died: July 30, 1834 (aged 92); Portland, Maine, U.S.
- Occupation: Sea captain
- Spouse: Arhoda Barbour Bradford (1770–1829; her death)

Samuel Drinkwater (February 24, 1742 – July 30, 1834) was an American sea captain. A native of North Yarmouth, Province of Massachusetts, he became captain of the USS Enterprise during the War of 1812.

== Early life ==
Drinkwater was born in 1742 in North Yarmouth, Province of Massachusetts, to Joseph Drinkwater and Janet Latham, one of their eight sons.

== Career ==
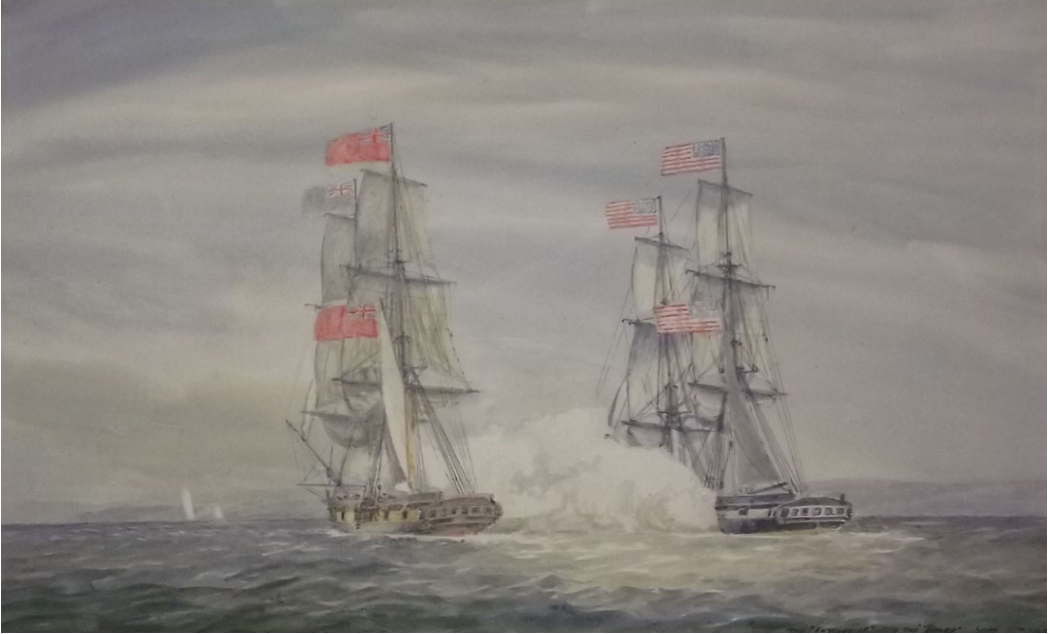
The capture of HMS Boxer by Enterprise

During the American Revolutionary War, Drinkwater served in the Massachusetts militia. He transported military cargo and troops on his ship, the Sparrow, during the Penobscot Expedition of 1779.

Along with William Burrows, who was forty years his junior, a 69-year-old Drinkwater captained the USS Enterprise during the War of 1812. After Burrows died in action, Drinkwater guided the vessel back to Portland's harbor while towing the defeated HMS Boxer, which had been captained by Samuel Blyth, who also died in the combat. It is believed Drinkwater had lost some, if not all, of his hearing due to cannonfire.

== Personal life ==
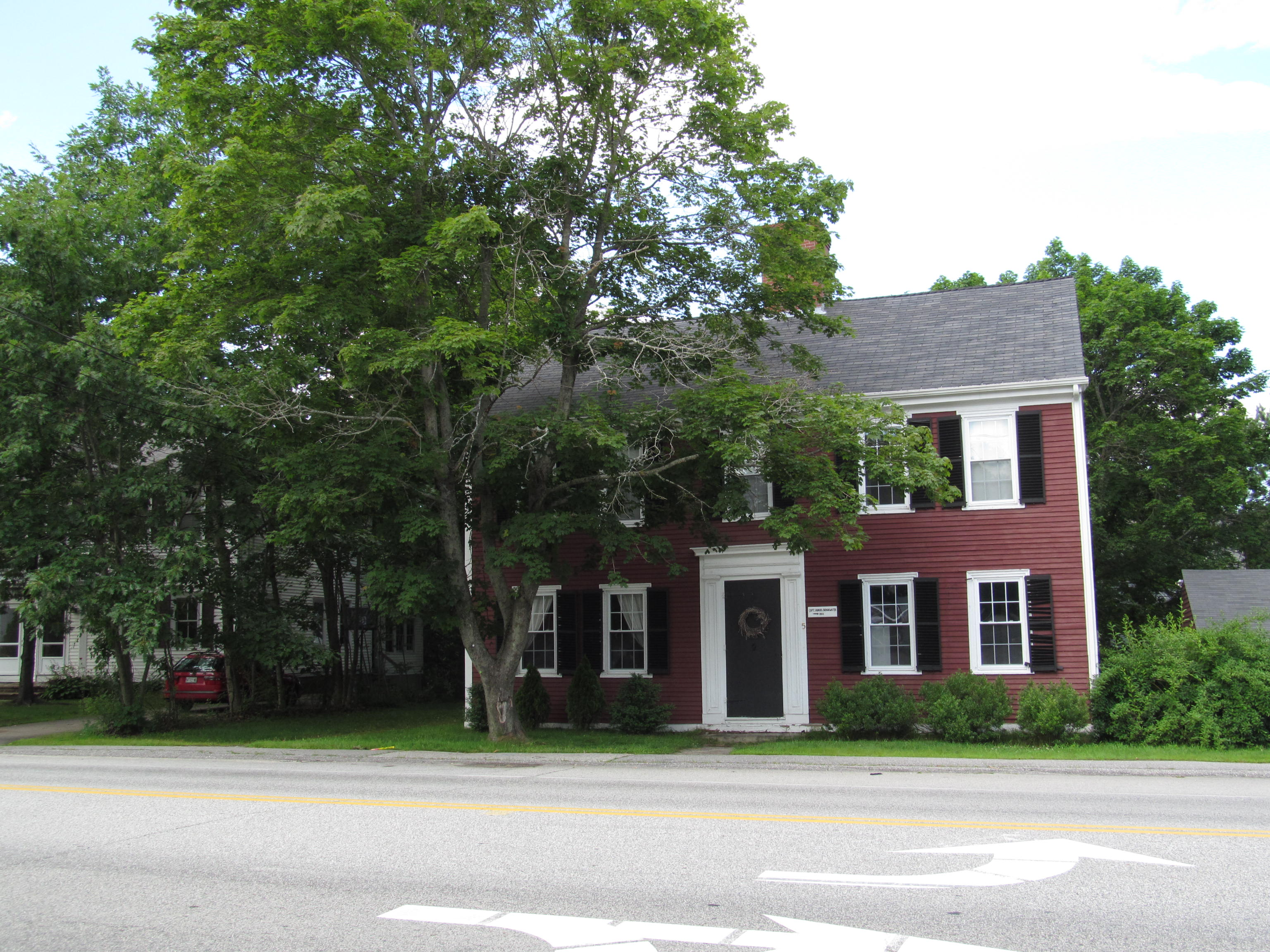
The Samuel Drinkwater House, 5 West Main Street, Yarmouth, Maine, built in 1803

Drinkwater married Arhoda Barbour Bradford in 1770, with whom he had twelve children. Their youngest son, Sewall, also fought in the War of 1812 with the Massachusetts militia.

In 1798, Drinkwater and Abel Sawyer purchased the sloop Cyrus from the Harvard Corporation.

He became the first owner of today's number 5 West Main Street in North Yarmouth, Massachusetts, in 1803. The house passed to his brother, Joseph, after Samuel moved to Portland, Maine's largest city, in 1810. He lived there until his death. Joseph Drinkwater gifted the house to his granddaughter Martha (daughter of Sewall) prior to his 1822 death.

In 1825, Drinkwater applied for a military pension, but was initially denied because deafness was not considered to be a war wound. He was instead seen as a contractor. He was awarded the pension after an act of Congress, largely the work of John Anderson, Maine Republican.

== Death ==
Drinkwater died in 1834, aged 92. He had survived his wife by five years, and was interred beside her in Eastern Cemetery in Portland. His headstone went missing for several years, but was replaced with a new marble stone in 2023.
