= Burrows =

Burrows may refer to:

- Plural of burrow
- Burrows (surname), people with the surname Burrows

== Places ==
- Burrows (electoral district), a provincial electoral district in Manitoba, Canada
- Burrows, Saskatchewan, Canada
- Burrows, Indiana, United States
- Burrows Township, Platte County, Nebraska, United States
- USS Burrows, several US Navy ships with this name

== See also ==
- Burroughs (disambiguation)
- Burrow (disambiguation)
