= William Ward Burrows II =

United States Navy officer (1785–1813)

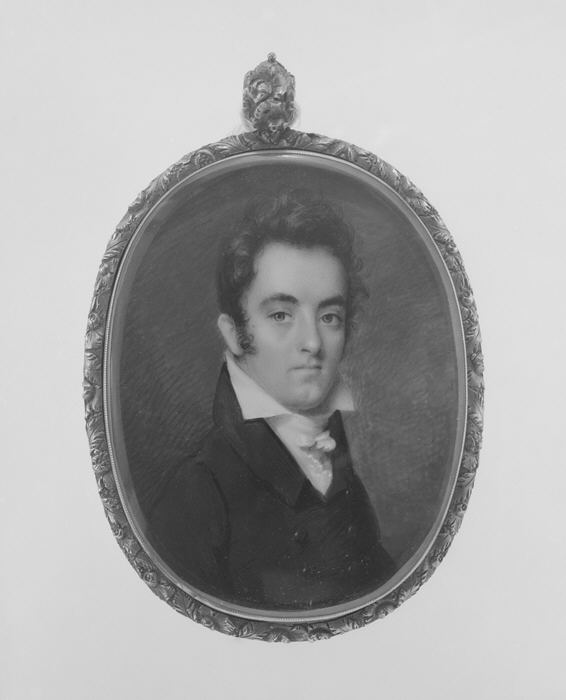
- Born: October 6, 1785
- Died: September 5, 1813 (aged 27)
- Branch: United States Navy

Lieutenant William Ward Burrows II (October 6, 1785 – September 5, 1813) was an officer in the United States Navy during the First Barbary War and the War of 1812. His father, William Ward Burrows I, was the second Commandant of the Marine Corps.

Burrows was born in Philadelphia, and appointed a Midshipman in 1799. He distinguished himself at Tripoli onboard Constitution. Lieutenant Burrows died while in command of the brig USS Enterprise as a result of wounds received during the engagement with the British brig HMS Boxer. He was buried at Eastern Cemetery in Portland, Maine, next to the slain commander of Boxer, Samuel Blyth. His tablet notes that it was "erected by a passing stranger." For Burrows' actions, he was awarded the Congressional Gold Medal.

Three ships in the United States Navy have been named USS Burrows for him. Blyth & Burrows, a bar in Portland, Maine, is named for the duo.

== Congressional Gold Medal citation ==
That the President of the United States be requested to present to the nearest male relative of lieutenant William Burrows, and to lieutenant Edward R. McCall of the brig Enterprise, a gold medal with suitable emblems and devices; and a silver medal with like emblems and devices to each of the commissioned officers of the aforesaid vessel, in testimony of the high sense entertained in the conflict with the British sloop Boxer, on the fourth of September, in the year one thousand eight hundred and thirteen. And the President is also requested to communicate to the nearest male relative of lieutenant Burrows the deep regret which Congress feel for the loss of that valuable officer, who died in the arms of victory, nobly contending for his country's rights and fame.
