= Eastern Cemetery =

- U.S. National Register of Historic Places
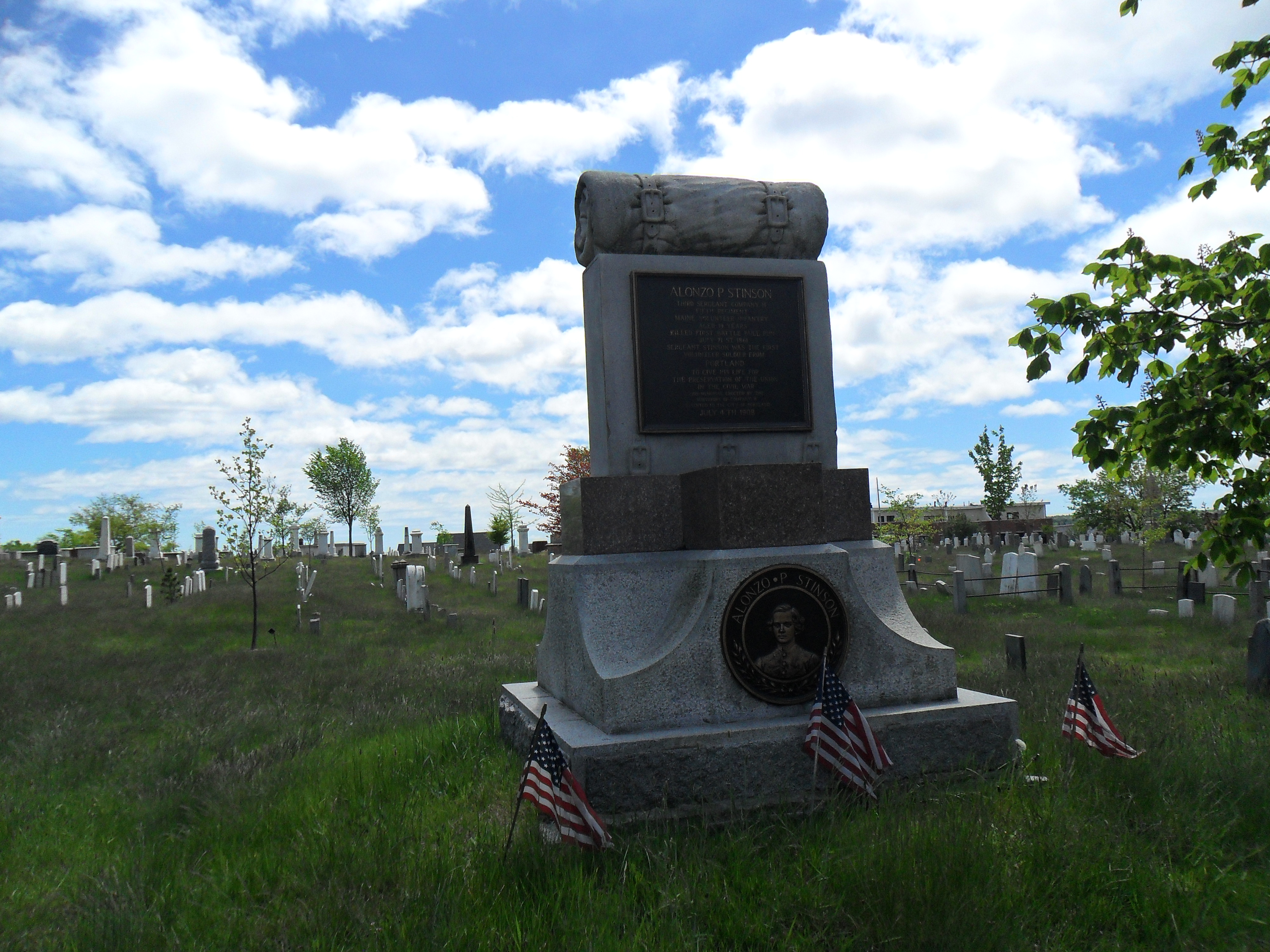
- Monument to Sgt. Alonzo P. Stinson, 5th Maine Volunteers, killed in action July 21, 1861

- Location within Maine Location within the United States
- Location: Congress St., corner Mountfort St., Portland, Maine
- Coordinates: 43°39′46″N 70°15′3″W
- Area: 5.3 acres (2.1 ha)
- Built: 1668
- NRHP reference No.: 73000112
- Added to NRHP: December 12, 1973

Eastern Cemetery is a historic cemetery at the intersection of Washington Avenue and Congress Street in the Munjoy Hill neighborhood of Portland, Maine. Established in 1668, it is the city's oldest historic site. It has more than 4,000 marked graves with an estimated further 3,000 burials in unmarked plots. It was listed on the National Register of Historic Places in 1973.

The cemetery is owned by the city of Portland. The volunteer nonprofit group Spirits Alive, founded in 2006, is dedicated to the protection and preservation of the cemetery through conservation and education. Spirits Alive offers daily walking tours from June through mid-October.

== Description and history ==
Eastern Cemetery is located on the northeastern part of the Portland peninsula, at the base of Munjoy Hill. It occupies a roughly triangular, seven-acre lot bounded on the north by Congress Street, the east by Mountfort Street, and the south by Federal Street. The sloping lot is only at street level along Congress and part of Mountfort Street, the rest supported by a stone retaining wall. Its street-facing sides are ringed by iron fencing, with the main entrance gates on Congress Street. The landscape is mostly grass, with a few widely spaced trees.

Eastern Cemetery was comprehensively surveyed by City Engineer William Goodwin in 1890. Goodwin's map divided the cemetery into 12 sections, A to L. Every individual grave marker, monument or tomb—a total of 4,189—was assigned a number within one of these sections.

The only building in the cemetery is the Dead House, a small shed that stands immediately inside the front gate. Built in 1871 and restored 2014–2016, the Dead House protects the entrance to the City Receiving Tomb. The 21-foot-long underground tomb, built in 1849, had space for temporary storage of up to 80 coffins during the winter months. Use of the tomb was discontinued after about 40 years.

The earliest burials were clustered in what is now Section E near a tall Norway pine. Successive replacement trees were planted after the original tree blew down; the current white pine was planted in 1969.

The size of the cemetery was approximately doubled in 1795, when the city purchased a plot of land along Congress Street from the Reverend Thomas Smith. The land, now Sections A and B, had been used as a town common; at one time a gallows and stocks stood there.

Eighty-six underground family tombs were constructed on the new land. Laid out in four rows, the tombs could house up to thirty coffins each.

Certain sections along the perimeter of the cemetery were reserved for minority populations. As the cemetery expanded in the late 18th century, graves of Black residents were segregated in Section L, in what was then the back edge of the property. A second area designated for graves of Black people was in use by 1825. There are also sections designated for Quakers, Catholics, Black Catholics and "Strangers" (that is, paupers and those without known family). Several of these sections, which do not appear on historical maps of the cemetery, were discovered by the historian Ron Romano.

As Eastern Cemetery became crowded beyond capacity, the city opened Western Cemetery in 1829 and, twenty-five years later, Evergreen Cemetery. In 1858, burials at Eastern were officially suspended except for those in existing family plots or tombs. As Eastern Cemetery fell out of favor in the last half of the nineteenth century, families had the remains of more than 700 disinterred and reburied at other cemeteries, most notably Evergreen.

The retaining walls along Mountfort and Federal Streets date from 1854 and 1868, respectively. The iron and granite fence along Congress Street was erected in 1916, having been moved from Portland High School.

== Mary Green's headstone ==
The grave marker with the earliest death date belongs to Mistress Mary Green, who died on May 23, 1717, at the age of 54. She was the sister-in-law of Major Samuel Moody, who led the resettlement of Falmouth Neck (now Portland) in 1716. No markers have survived from earlier burials dating back to the 1660s.

== The captains' graves ==
The graves of Lt. William Ward Burrows II, US Navy (1785–1813), and Commander Samuel Blyth, Royal Navy (1783–1813), have a prominent place on high ground in the cemetery. Both men were killed when the ships they commanded met in battle off the Maine coast during the War of 1812. The action ended with the capture of HMS Boxer by the USS Enterprise. The two captains' bodies were taken to Portland, where they were buried side by side following a grand funeral procession through the city. A third grave was placed next to the captains two years later after Lt. Kervin Waters, a young American officer mortally wounded in the battle, succumbed to his injuries.

== Notable burials ==
- Bartlett Adams (1776–1828), stonecutter
- George Bradbury (1770–1823), Congressman
- Charles Q. Clapp (1799–1868), architect and merchant
- Charles Codman (1800–1842), landscape and marine painter
- Nathaniel Coffin (1744–1826), physician
- Samuel Drinkwater (1742–1834), sea captain
- Mark Harris (1779–1843), Congressman
- John Holmes (1773–1843), Congressman
- Daniel Ilsley (1740–1813), Congressman
- James Milk (1710–1772), deacon and shipwright
- Captain Lemuel Moody (1767–1846), builder of the Portland Observatory
- Commodore Edward Preble (1761–1807), hero of the first Barbary War, established traditions and practices of the U.S. Navy
- William Widgery (1753–1822), Congressman
- Henry Aiken Worcester (1802–1841), minister

== Monuments ==
- Stinson Monument: A granite and bronze cenotaph topped by a soldier’s bedroll honors Sgt. Alonzo P. Stinson, Company H of the 5th Maine Infantry Regiment. Sgt. Stinson (1842–1861) was the first soldier from a Portland unit to die in action in the Civil War. He was buried near where he fell in the First Battle of Bull Run in June 1861. The monument was designed by George E. Brown and dedicated in 1908.
- Alden Monument: The grave of Rear Admiral James Alden Jr. (1810–1877) is marked by a tall pink granite pillar. A Portland native, Admiral Alden joined the US Navy at the age of 18, serving in the Mexican-American and Civil Wars. He was a surveyor and mapmaker on the United States Exploring Expedition, which discovered the Antarctic continent among other accomplishments.
- Henry Wadsworth Monument: A cenotaph honoring Lt. Henry Wadsworth, US Navy (1785–1804), uncle and namesake of the poet Henry Wadsworth Longfellow, stands near the Captains' Graves. Lt. Wadsworth died in Tripoli Harbor during the First Barbary War in an explosion aboard the fire ship USS Intrepid. Attempts to return his remains from a grave in Tripoli have been unsuccessful

== Gravestones by Bartlett Adams ==
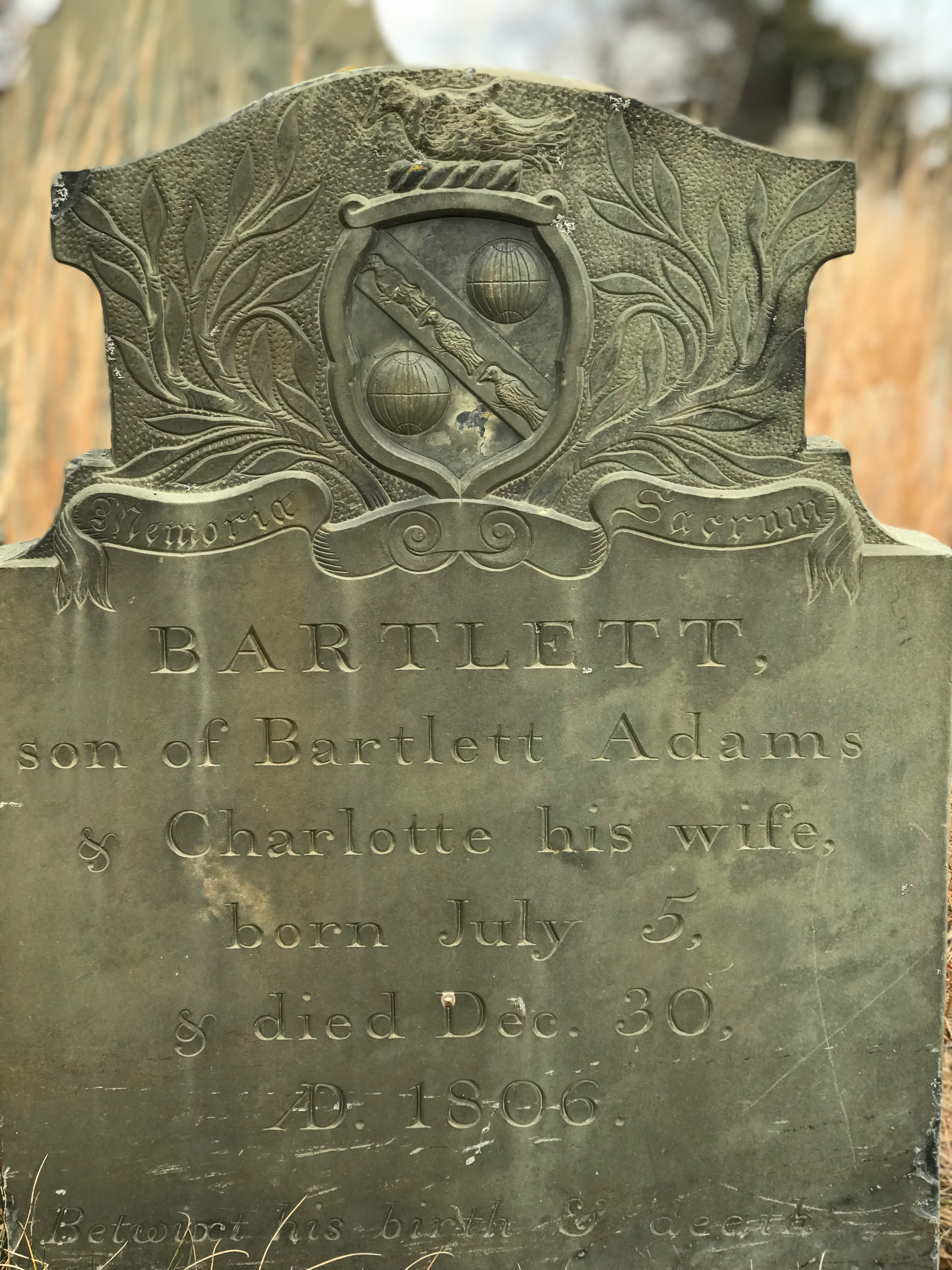
Bartlett Adams; grave marker for his son and namesake.

Bartlett Adams (1776–1828) operated the first stone-cutting shop in Portland. Located just a few blocks from Eastern Cemetery, his shop produced about 700 gravestones between 1800 and 1828 that can be found in the cemetery today. One of the most noteworthy is the richly detailed stone he made for his namesake and son in 1806. Bartlett Adams Sr. died in 1828, aged 51. He and other members of his family were laid to rest in a private tomb at Eastern Cemetery. The table-style monument that once decorated the tomb has been lost or destroyed, though a small sandstone marker at the entrance to the tomb is still there bearing his name.

== See also ==
- National Register of Historic Places listings in Portland, Maine
- Portland Freedom Trail
