= Milk (disambiguation) =

Milk is a nutrient liquid produced by the mammary glands of mammals.

Milk may also refer to:

== Drinkable liquids ==
=== Produced by animals ===
- Breast milk, milk produced by a human mammary gland
- Buffalo milk, milk of a domestic water buffalo
- Camel milk, milk produced by camels
- Donkey milk, milk produced by donkeys
- Goat milk, milk produced by goats
- Mare milk, milk produced by horses
- Moose milk, milk produced by moose
- Powdered milk, powder that is drinkable when mixed with water
- Sheep milk, milk produced by sheep
- Yak milk, milk of a domestic yak

=== Produced from plants ===
- Almond milk, a milk-like beverage made from almonds
- Coconut milk, a milk-like substance derived from a coconut
- Milk substitute
- Oat milk, a milk-like substance made from oats
- Plant milk, any of various milk substitutes made from plants
- Rice milk, a milk-like beverage made from rice
- Soy milk, a milk-like beverage made from soybeans

=== Produced from chemicals ===
- Milk of magnesia, a suspension of magnesium hydroxide, used as an antacid and laxative

== People ==
- Milk (drag queen), stage name of Dan Donigan, an American drag artist and competitor on RuPaul's Drag Race
- Milk, Chinese pop artist and former member of the Taiwanese band Energy
- Harvey Milk (1930–1978), American politician and gay rights activist
- James Milk (1710–1772), American deacon and shipwright
- MILCK, American singer-songwriter

== Arts, entertainment, and media ==
=== Fictional characters ===
- Milk, a character in the rhythm game series maimai
- Milk (Dragon Ball) or Chi Chi, a character in Dragon Ball media
- Sunny Milk, a character in the Touhou Project series
- Milk family, several characters in The Boys franchise

=== Film and television ===
- Milk (2008 Turkish film), a film by Turkish writer/director Semih Kaplanoğlu
- Milk (2008 American film), a film about Harvey Milk
- Milk (2017 film), a Canadian drama film
- Milk (2021 film), a Russian comedy-drama film
- "Milk" (How I Met Your Mother), a 2006 television episode

=== Music ===
==== Ensembles ====
- Milk (band), an alternative band led by Jeff Tremaine
- Milk (Japanese band), a Japanese boy band
- M.I.L.K, a K-Pop girl group
- Milk Inc., a vocal trance band

==== Albums ====
- Milk (album), a 2010 album by Hawksley Workman
- Milk, a 2015 album by Better Off

==== Songs ====
- "Milk" (Kings of Leon song)
- "Milk" (Garbage song)
- "Milk" (The 1975 song)
- "Milk", a song by Brockhampton from Saturation
- "Milk", a song by the K-pop girl group f(x) from Red Light
- "Milk", a song by the Stormtroopers of Death from Speak English or Die
- "Milk", a song by Sweet Trip from You Will Never Know Why

=== Literature ===
- Milk (short story collection), a collection of short stories by Beverley Farmer
- Milk, a novel by Darcey Steinke

== Computing and technology ==
- Milk Inc., a company founded by Kevin Rose to work on mobile Web concepts
- Milk Music, a former music streaming service available in the Samsung Electronics app store

== See also ==
- Milk River (disambiguation)
- Crop milk, a secretion from the lining of the crop of parent birds that is regurgitated to young birds
- Milc (disambiguation)
