= USS Boxer (CV-21) =

Essex-class aircraft carrier of the US Navy

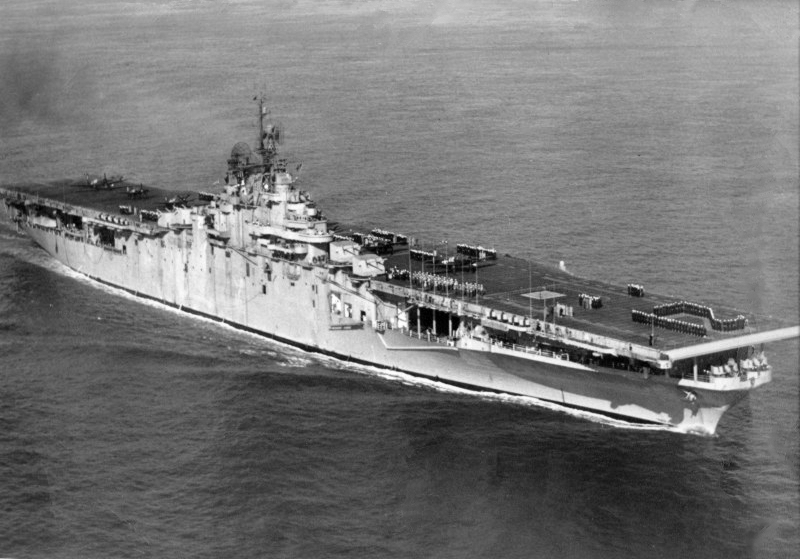
- USS Boxer in 1948

History

United States
- Name: Boxer
- Namesake: HMS Boxer (1812)
- Ordered: 1943
- Builder: Newport News Shipbuilding
- Laid down: 13 September 1943
- Launched: 14 December 1944
- Commissioned: 16 April 1945
- Decommissioned: 1 December 1969
- Reclassified: CVA-21, 1 October 1952; CVS-21, 15 November 1955; LPH-4, 30 January 1959; (Went to the Med in Jan. 1959 as CVA-11.)
- Stricken: 1 December 1969
- Fate: Scrapped at Kearny, February 1971

General characteristics
- Class & type: Essex-class aircraft carrier
- Displacement: 27,100 long tons (27,500 t) standard
- Length: 888 feet (271 m) overall
- Beam: 93 feet (28 m)
- Draft: 28 feet 7 inches (8.71 m)
- Installed power: 8 × boilers; 150,000 shp (110 MW)
- Propulsion: 4 × geared steam turbines; 4 × shafts
- Speed: 33 knots (61 km/h; 38 mph)
- Complement: 3448 officers and enlisted
- Armament: 12 × 5 inch (127 mm)/38 caliber guns; 32 × Bofors 40 mm guns; 46 × Oerlikon 20 mm cannons
- Armor: Belt: 4 in (102 mm); Hangar deck: 2.5 in (64 mm); Deck: 1.5 in (38 mm); Conning tower: 1.5 inch
- Aircraft carried: 90–100 aircraft

USS Boxer (CV/CVA/CVS-21, LPH-4) was one of 24 Essex-class aircraft carriers of the United States Navy, and the fifth ship to be named for HMS Boxer. She was launched on 14 December 1944 and christened by the daughter of a US Senator from Louisiana.

Commissioned too late to see any combat in World War II, Boxer spent much of her career in the Pacific Ocean, seeing 10 tours in the western Pacific. Her initial duties involved mostly training and exercises, including launching the first carrier-based jet aircraft, but demobilization prevented much activity in the late 1940s. At the outbreak of the Korean War, she was used as an aircraft transport before arriving off Korean waters as the third U.S. carrier to join the force. She supported the Inchon landings and subsequent invasion of North Korea, and was among the ships that provided support during the Chinese counteroffensive against an under-prepared and spread out United Nations (UN) force. She saw three subsequent combat tours in Korea, conducting close air support and strategic bombing in support of UN ground troops fighting along the 38th parallel, as the battles lines had largely solidified by this time. She was awarded eight battle stars for her service in Korea.

After the Korean War, Boxer saw a variety of duties, including as an anti-submarine warfare carrier and an amphibious assault platform. She participated in a number of training exercises including Operation Hardtack and Operation Steel Pike, as well as several contingencies including Operation Powerpack and the Cuban Missile Crisis. In her later years, she served as a pickup ship for spacecraft during the Apollo program, and as an aircraft transport to troops during the Vietnam War.

Although she was extensively modified internally as part of her conversion to a Landing Platform Helicopter (LPH), external modifications were minor, so throughout her career Boxer retained the classic appearance of a World War II Essex-class carrier. She was decommissioned on 1 December 1969 after 25 years of service and sold for scrap.

== Construction ==
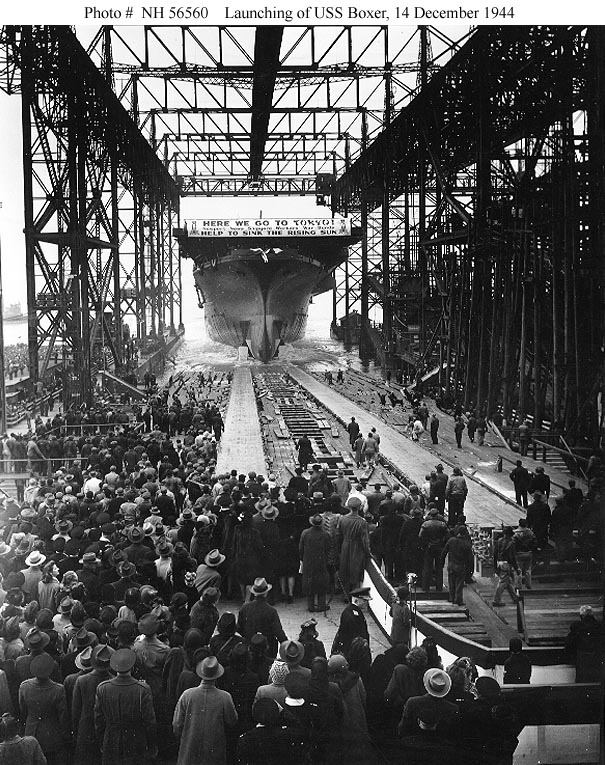
Boxer is launched, 14 December 1944.

Boxer was one of 24 Essex-class ships to be completed, among the largest and most numerous capital ships produced for World War II. She was ordered in 1943.

The ship was one of the "long-hull" designs of the class, which had begun production after March 1943. This "long hull" variant involved lengthening the bow above the waterline into a "clipper" form. The increased rake and flare provided deck space for two quadruple 40 mm mounts; these units also had the flight deck slightly shortened forward to provide better arcs of fire. Of the Essex-class ships laid down after 1942, only Bon Homme Richard followed the original "short bow" design. The later ships have been variously referred to as the "long-bow units", the "long-hull group", or the "Ticonderoga class". However, the U.S. Navy never maintained any institutional distinction between the long-hull and short-hull members of the Essex class, and postwar refits and upgrades were applied to both groups equally.

Like other "long-hull" Essex-class carriers, Boxer had a displacement of 27,100 tonnes (26,700 long tons; 29,900 short tons). She had an overall length of 888 feet (271 m), a beam of 93 feet (28 m) and a draft of 28 feet (8.5 m). The ship was powered by eight 600 psi Babcock & Wilcox boilers, and Westinghouse geared steam turbines that developed 150,000 shaft horsepower (110,000 kW) that turned four propellers. Like other Essex-class carriers, she had a maximum speed of 33 knots (61 km/h; 38 mph). The ship had a total crew complement of 3,448. Like other Essex-class ships, she could be armed with 12 5-inch (127 mm)/38 caliber guns arrayed in four pairs and four single emplacements, as well as eight quadruple Bofors 40 mm guns and 46 Oerlikon 20 mm cannons. However, unlike her sisters, Boxer was armed instead with 72 40 mm guns and 35 20 mm cannons.

Her keel was laid on 13 September 1943 by the Newport News Shipbuilding Company at its facility in Newport News, Virginia. She was the fifth ship of the US Navy to be named Boxer, after HMS Boxer, which had been captured by the U.S. during the War of 1812. The last ship to bear the name had been a training ship in 1905. The new carrier was launched on 14 December 1944 and she was christened by Ruth D. Overton, the daughter of U.S. Senator John H. Overton. The ship's cost is estimated at $68,000,000 to $78,000,000.

== Service history ==
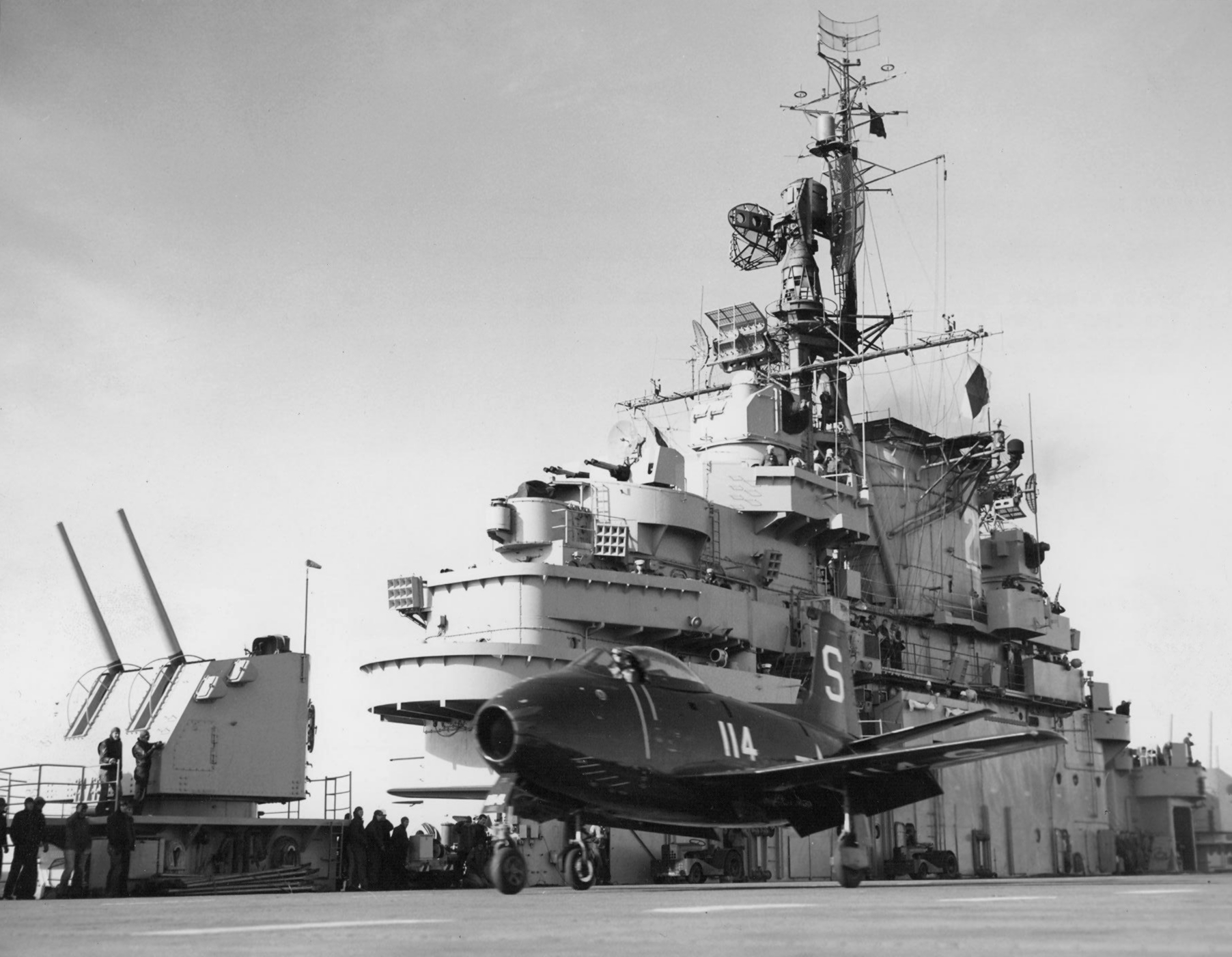
North American FJ-1 Fury launches from Boxer in March 1948, the first time an all-jet aircraft was launched from an American aircraft carrier at sea. (Note: The first aircraft with a jet engine to operate from an aircraft carrier was the unusual composite propeller-jet Ryan FR Fireball, but it normally flew primarily under prop power during takeoff and landing. The first-ever all-jet carrier operations were conducted on 4 December 1945 using a de Havilland Sea Vampire piloted by Royal Navy Captain Eric "Winkle" Brown from HMS Ocean. The first all-jet aircraft to take off and land from an American carrier was a McDonnell XFD-1 Phantom on 21 July 1946 from USS Franklin D. Roosevelt, but the tests were not conducted under operational conditions.)

Boxer was commissioned on 16 April 1945 under the command of Captain D. F. Smith. She subsequently began sea trials and a shakedown cruise. Before these were complete, the Empire of Japan surrendered on V-J Day, marking the end of World War II before Boxer could participate. She joined the Pacific Fleet at San Diego in August 1945 and the next month she steamed for Guam, becoming the flagship of Task Force 77, a position she held until 23 August 1946. During this tour, she visited Japan, Okinawa, the Philippines, and China.

She returned to San Francisco on 10 September 1946, embarked Carrier Air Group 19 flying the Grumman F8F Bearcat fighter. With this complement, Boxer began a series of peacetime patrols and training missions off the coast of California during a relatively uneventful period during 1947. In spite of manning difficulties brought on by the demobilization of the US military after World War II, Boxer remained active in Pacific readiness drills around the West Coast and Hawaii. In 1948, she conducted a number of short cruises with US Navy Reserve personnel. On 10 March 1948, a North American FJ-1 Fury launched from Boxer, the first such launch of an all-jet aircraft from an American carrier, which allowed subsequent tests of jet aircraft carrier doctrine. For the remainder of 1948 and 1949, she participated in numerous battle drills and acted as a training carrier for jet aircraft pilots.

She was dispatched to the Far East on another tour on 11 January 1950. She joined the 7th Fleet in the region, making a goodwill visit to South Korea and entertaining South Korean president Syngman Rhee and his wife Franziska Donner. and at the end of the tour returned to San Diego on 25 June 1950, the same day as the outbreak of the Korean War. At the time, she was overdue for a maintenance overhaul, but she did not have time to complete it before being dispatched again.

=== Korean War ===
With the outbreak of the Korean War, the U.S. forces in the Far East had an urgent need for supplies and aircraft. The only aircraft carriers near Korea were USS Valley Forge and HMS Triumph. Boxer was ordered into service to ferry aircraft from California to the fighting on the Korean Peninsula. She made a record-breaking crossing of the Pacific Ocean, leaving Alameda, California, on 14 July 1950 and arriving at Yokosuka, Japan, on 23 July, a trip of 8 days and 7 hours. She carried 145 North American P-51 Mustangs and six Stinson L-5 Sentinels of the United States Air Force destined for the Far East Air Force as well as 19 Navy aircraft, 1,012 Air Force support personnel, and 2,000 tonnes (2,000 long tons; 2,200 short tons) of supplies for the United Nations troops fighting the North Korean invasion of South Korea, including crucially needed spare parts and ordnance. Much of this equipment had been taken from Air National Guard units in the United States because of a general shortage of materiel. She began her return trip from Yokosuka on 27 July and arrived back in California on 4 August, for a trip of 7 days, 10 hours and 36 minutes, again breaking the record for a trans-Pacific cruise. She carried no jet aircraft, though, because they were deemed too fuel inefficient for the initial defense mission in Korea. By the time Boxer arrived in Korea, the UN forces had established superiority in the air and sea.

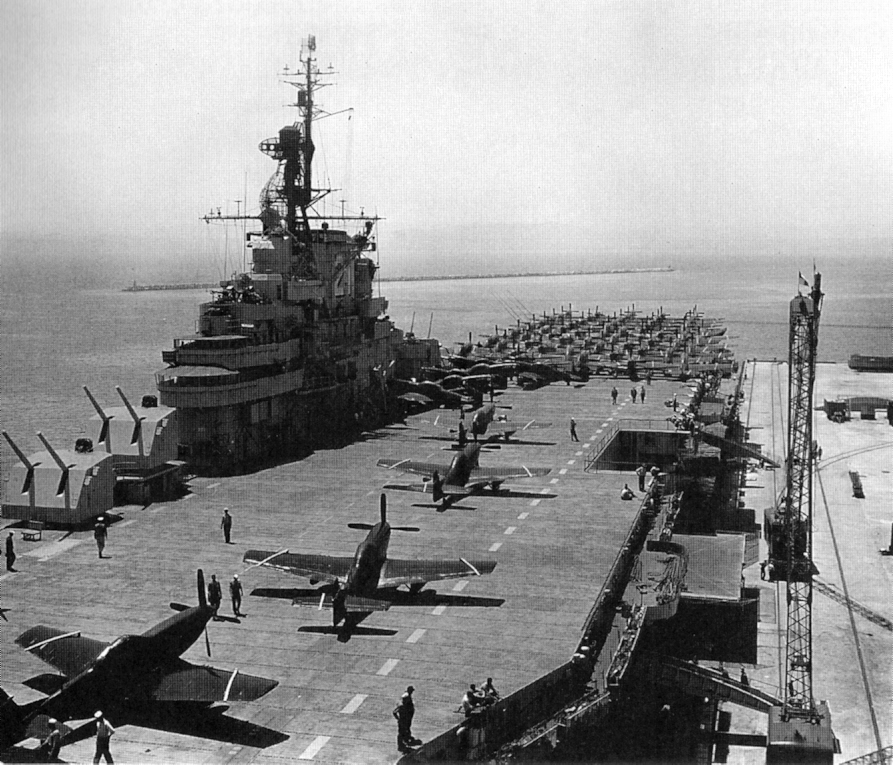
Boxer loads USAF F-51 Mustangs at Alameda for the Korean theater, in July 1950.

After rapid repairs in California, Boxer embarked Carrier Air Group 2, flying the Vought F4U Corsair propeller driven fighter-bomber, and departed again for Korea on 24 August, this time in a combat role. She had 110 aircraft aboard, intended to complement the hundreds of aircraft already operating in Korea. En route to the peninsula, the carrier narrowly avoided Typhoon Kezia which slowed her trip. She was the fourth aircraft carrier to arrive in Korea to participate in the war, after Triumph and Valley Forge had arrived in June and USS Philippine Sea followed in early August. She arrived too late to participate in the Battle of Pusan Perimeter, but instead she was ordered to join a flotilla of 230 US ships which would participate in Operation Chromite, the UN counterattack at Inchon. On 15 September, she supported the landings by sending her aircraft in a close air support role, blocking North Korean reinforcements and communication to prevent them from countering the attack. However, early in the operation, her propulsion system was damaged when a reduction gear in the ship's engine broke, a casualty of her overdue maintenance. The ship's engineers worked around the problem to keep the carrier in operation, but she was limited to 26 knots.

She continued this role as the UN troops recaptured Seoul days later. Boxer continued this support as UN troops advanced north and into North Korea, but departed for the United States on 11 November for refit and overhaul. US military commanders believed the war in Korea was over, and had ordered a number of other carriers out of the area and were subsequently under-prepared at the beginning of the Chosin Reservoir Campaign when the Chinese People's Liberation Army entered the war against the UN. Battlefield commanders requested Boxer return to Korea as soon as possible, but she did not immediately return as commanders feared it might reduce the Navy's ability to respond if another conflict or emergency broke out elsewhere.

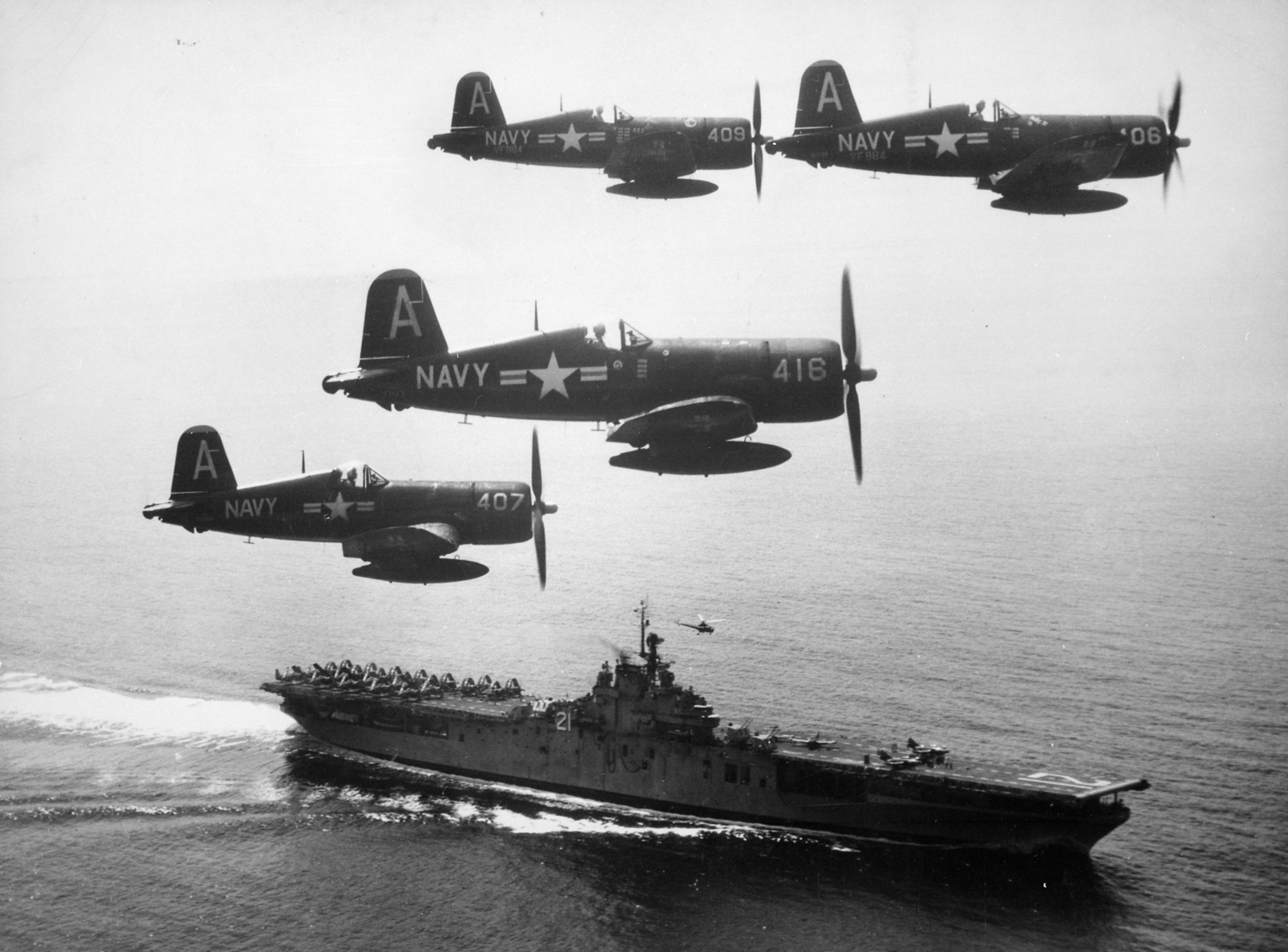
Vought F4U Corsairs from Air Group 101 depart from Boxer for a mission in Korea, 1951. One of these ("416") survived the war and is airworthy as of 2016.

Boxer's propulsion problems required extensive repair, so she returned to San Diego to conduct them. Upon arrival, she offloaded Air Group 2, which then embarked for Korea again aboard Valley Forge. After a repair and refit in California, Boxer was prepared for a second tour in Korea. She embarked Carrier Air Group 101. The group was composed of Navy Reserve squadrons from Dallas, Texas, Glenview, Illinois, Memphis, Tennessee and Olathe, Kansas, and most of its pilots were reservists who had been called to active duty. She rejoined Task Force 77, and began operations in Korea on 29 March 1951, and her squadrons were the first Naval Reserve pilots to launch strikes in Korea. Most of these missions were airstrikes against Chinese ground forces along the 38th parallel, and this duty lasted until 24 October 1951. During this time, the carrier operated around "Point Oboe", an area 125 miles (201 km) off the coast of Wonsan. They would withdraw another 50 miles (80 km) east when they needed replenishment or refueling. A large destroyer screen protected the carriers, though MiG-15 attacks against them did not occur.

After another period of rest and refits, Boxer departed California 8 February 1952 for her third tour in Korea, with Carrier Air Group 2 embarked, consisting of F9F in VF-24, F4U in VF 63 and VF-64, and AD in VF-65. Rejoining Task Force 77, her missions during this tour consisted primarily of strategic bombing against targets in North Korea, as the front lines in the war had largely solidified along the 38th Parallel. On 23 and 24 June, her planes conducted strikes against the Sui-ho hydro-electric complex in conjunction with Princeton, Bon Homme Richard and Philippine Sea.

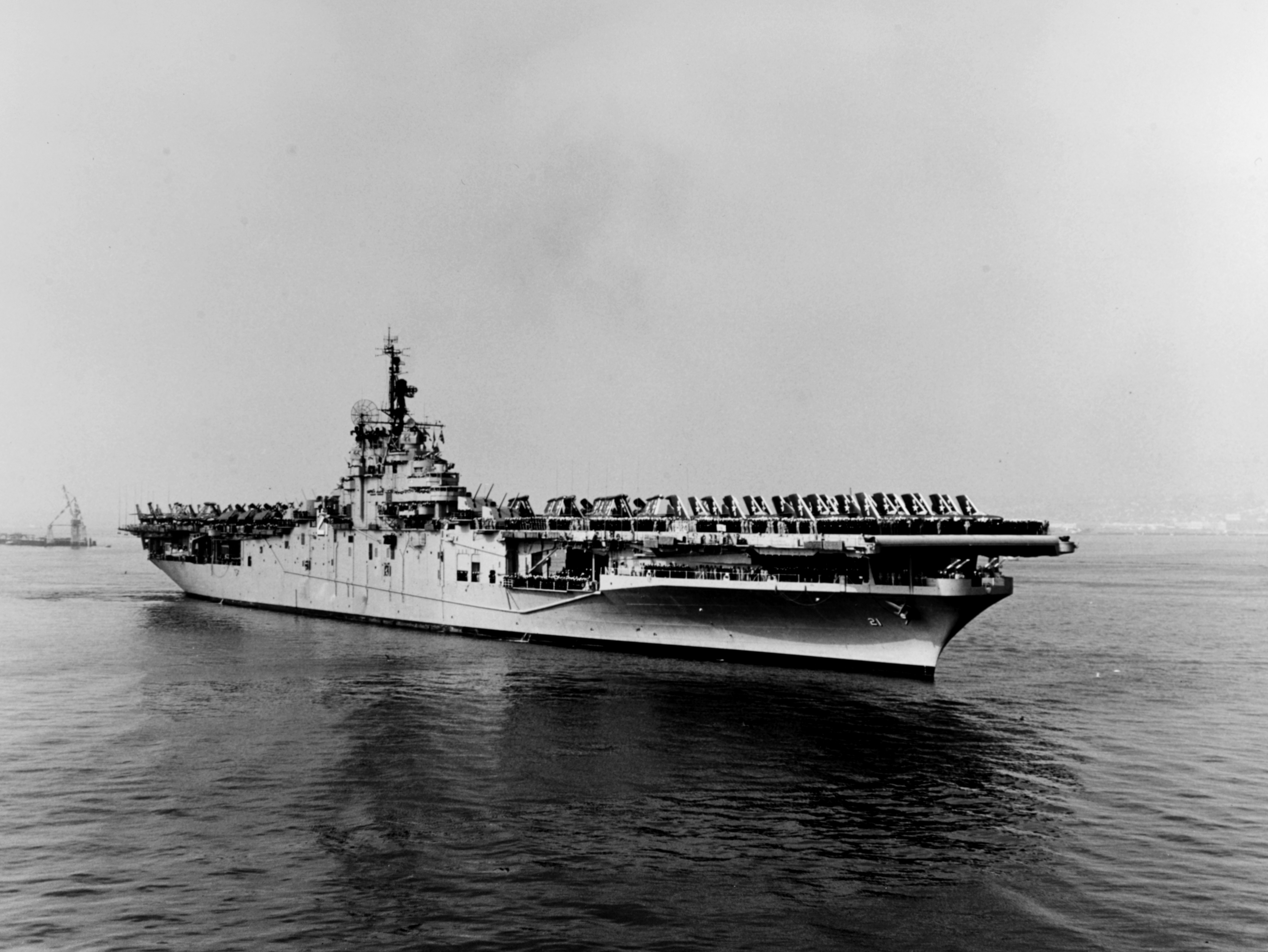
Boxer in San Francisco after her return from the Korean War in November 1953.

On 5 August 1952, a fire broke out on the hangar deck of Boxer at 05:30 when a fuel tank of an aircraft caught fire while the ship was conducting combat operations in the Sea of Japan. The fire raged on the carrier's hangar deck for 4–5 hours before being extinguished. The final total of casualties was 8 dead, 1 missing, 1 critically injured, 1 seriously burned and some 70 overcome by smoke. Of the 63 who had gone over the side, all were rescued and returned to the ship. Eighteen aircraft, mostly Grumman F9F-2 Panthers, were damaged or destroyed. She steamed for Yokosuka for emergency repairs from 11 to 23 August. She returned to the Korean theatre, and from 28 August to 2 September she tested a new weapons system, with six radio guided Grumman F6F Hellcats loaded with 1,000-pound (450 kg) bombs guided to targets, resulting in two hits and one near miss. They are considered to be the first guided missiles to be launched from a carrier in combat. On 1 September her aircraft also took part in a large bombing mission of an oil refinery near Aoji, on the Manchurian border. She returned to San Francisco for more extensive repairs on 25 September. In October 1952, she was re-designated CVA-21, denoting an "attack aircraft carrier."

Following extensive repairs, she steamed for Korea again on 30 March 1953, and resumed operations a month later with her Corsairs embarked. Her missions around this time were generally strategic bombing missions, however the effectiveness of these final missions were mixed, with some failing to achieve strategic results. She also provided close air support for UN troops for the final weeks of the war before an armistice was reached at Panmunjom in July 1953, ending major combat operations in Korea. During this time, the two sides often conducted costly attacks in order to strengthen their bargaining positions at the negotiating table. Boxer remained in Korean waters until November 1953. She received eight battle stars for her service in Korea.

In 1951 she appears in the film Submarine Command, with William Bendix and William Holden, then carrying a complement of helicopters.

=== Post-Korea ===
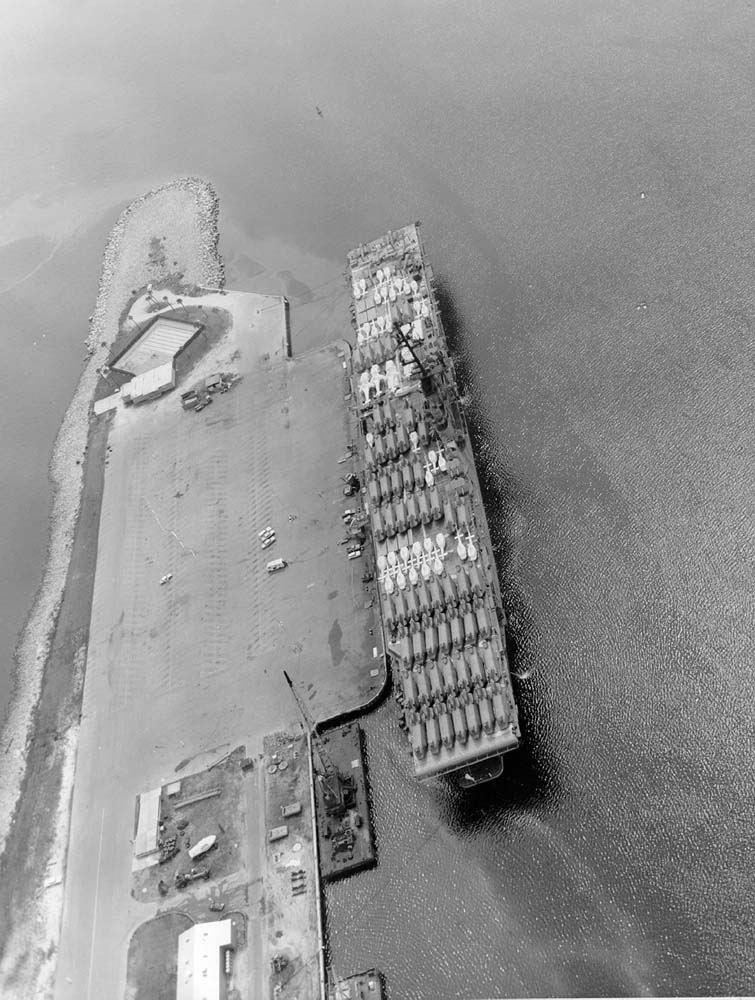
Boxer loaded with 200 helicopters of the 1st Cavalry Division bound for the Vietnam War, 1965

Following the Korean War, Boxer returned to the United States. She conducted a tour of the Pacific throughout 1954 which was relatively uneventful. That tour included being dispatched along with the USS Essex to the South China Sea, between Indochina and the Philippines, while the United States considered whether to use carrier aircraft to support French troops during the Battle of Dien Bien Phu, a key battle in the First Indochina War. The United States eventually decided to not join the fighting. The tour of the Pacific was followed by a rest in the United States and another tour in the Pacific in late 1955 and early 1956, which was similarly uneventful.

She was converted to an anti-submarine warfare carrier in early 1956, re-designated CVS-21. She completed another tour of the western Pacific in late 1956 and early 1957, which was her tenth and final deployment to the area. In late 1957, the navy began experimenting with the concept of a carrier operating entirely with attack helicopters, and Boxer was used to test the concept.

In 1958, Boxer was the flagship during Operation Hardtack, a series of nuclear weapons tests in the central Pacific. Later that year, she was transferred to the Atlantic Fleet, and became part of a new amphibious assault squadron with four Landing Ship Tank vessels equipped with helicopter platforms. The experimental concept would allow for rapid deployment of US Marine Corps personnel and helicopter squadrons. For the remainder of 1958 elements of this force were organized aboard Boxer and she was reclassified LPH-4, denoting a "Landing Platform Helicopter", on 30 January 1959.

For the next 10 years, Boxer operated mainly out of the Caribbean as an amphibious assault carrier. During this duty, she was on station during the 1962 Cuban Missile Crisis. In 1964, she undertook her first tour to the Mediterranean when she took part in Operation Steel Pike, the largest amphibious exercise in history.

With two LSD ships, Boxer was dispatched to Hispaniola on 29 August 1964 on a humanitarian mission to aid Haiti and the Dominican Republic whose infrastructure had been damaged by Hurricane Cleo. The ships provided medical aid and helped to evacuate civilians displaced by the storm. On 27 April 1965 Boxer returned to the Dominican Republic with Helicopter Squadron 264 and a complement of Marines. They evacuated about 1,000 US nationals from the country in the wake of a revolution in the country. It was a part of Operation Powerpack which would eventually see the US occupation of that country. Later in 1965, she was used as a transport vessel for the Vietnam War. The carrier transported 200 helicopters of the US Army's 1st Cavalry Division to South Vietnam. She made a second trip to Vietnam in early 1966 when she transported Marine Corps aircraft to South Vietnam. However, she did not participate in combat operations during that war.

On 26 February 1966, Boxer recovered AS-201, an unmanned test flight of the Apollo program which had launched from Cape Kennedy, Florida aboard a Saturn 1B rocket. The capsule had landed 200 miles (320 km) east of Ascension Island and one of Boxer's helicopters picked it up. From 16–17 March 1966, Boxer was the designated Atlantic prime recovery ship for Gemini 8, although USS Leonard F. Mason recovered the spacecraft and two crewmen after it encountered problems.

She was decommissioned on 1 December 1969 after 25 years of service, and she was stricken from the Naval Vessel Register. She was sold for scrap on 13 March 1971 by Defense Reutilization and Marketing Service and later scrapped at the Brooklyn Navy Yard.

== Awards ==

Navy Unit Commendation (twice)
Navy Meritorious Unit Commendation	Navy Battle Efficiency Ribbon	Navy Expeditionary Medal (Cuba)
China Service Medal (extended)	American Campaign Medal	Asiatic-Pacific Campaign Medal
World War II Victory Medal	Navy Occupation Service Medal (with Asia clasp)	National Defense Service Medal (twice)
Korean Service Medal (with 8 battle stars)	Armed Forces Expeditionary Medal (Cuba, Dominican Republic)	Vietnam Service Medal (with 2 battle stars)
Republic of Korea Presidential Unit Citation	United Nations Service Medal	Republic of Korea War Service Medal (retroactive)

== Gallery ==
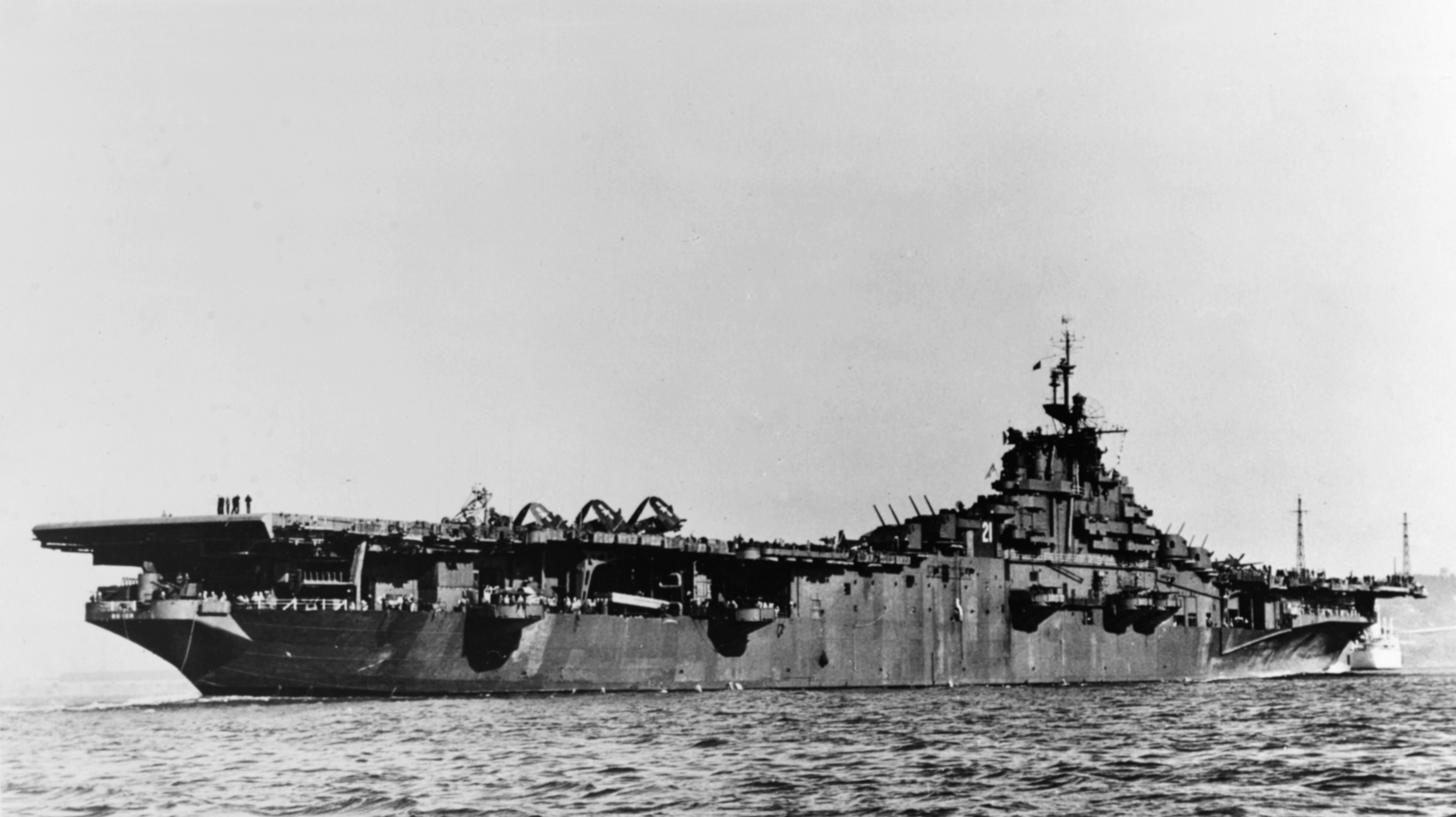
Boxer in her original configuration in 1945

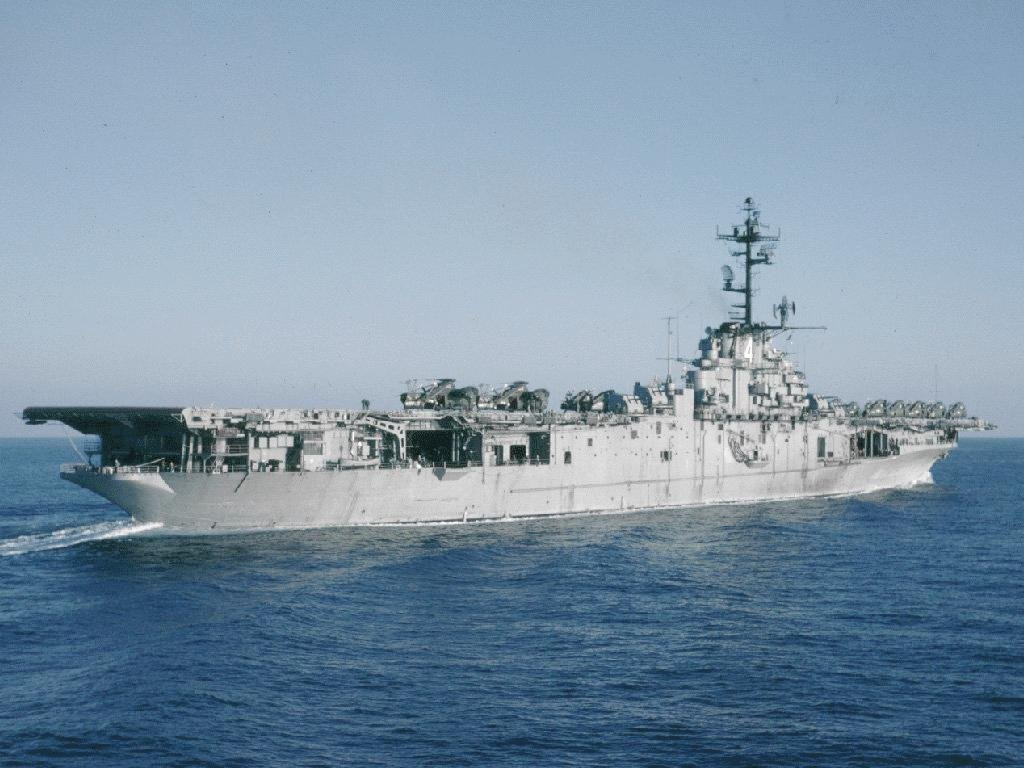
Boxer in October 1964

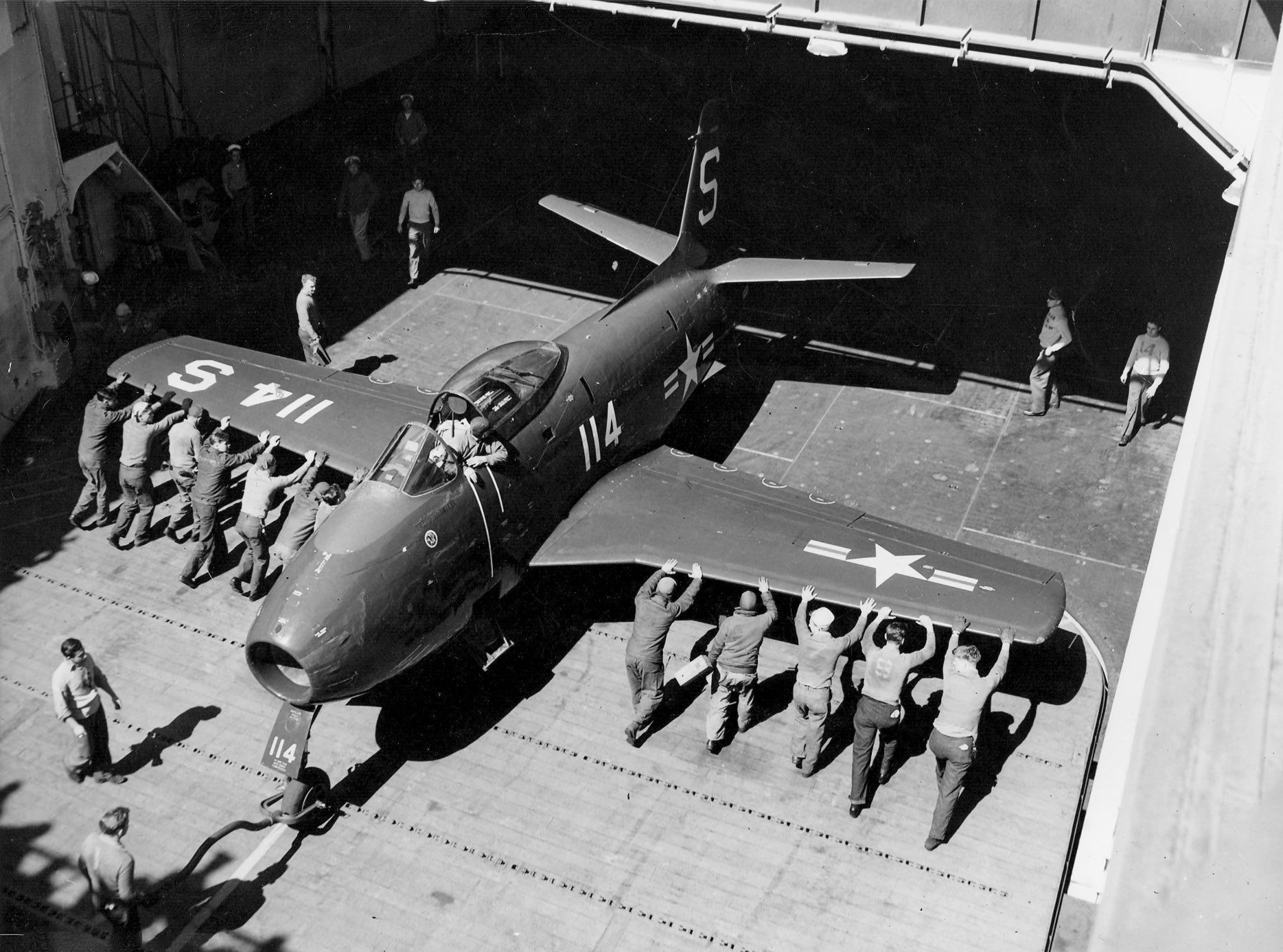
Boxer's crew pushing a FJ-1 Fury from the ship's elevator in 1948

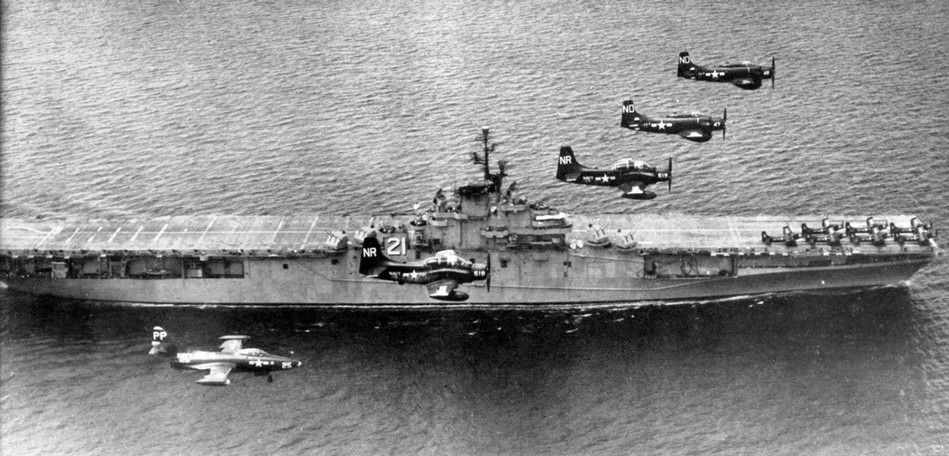
Boxer with Douglas AD-4W and Grumman F9F-5P off Korea in 1955

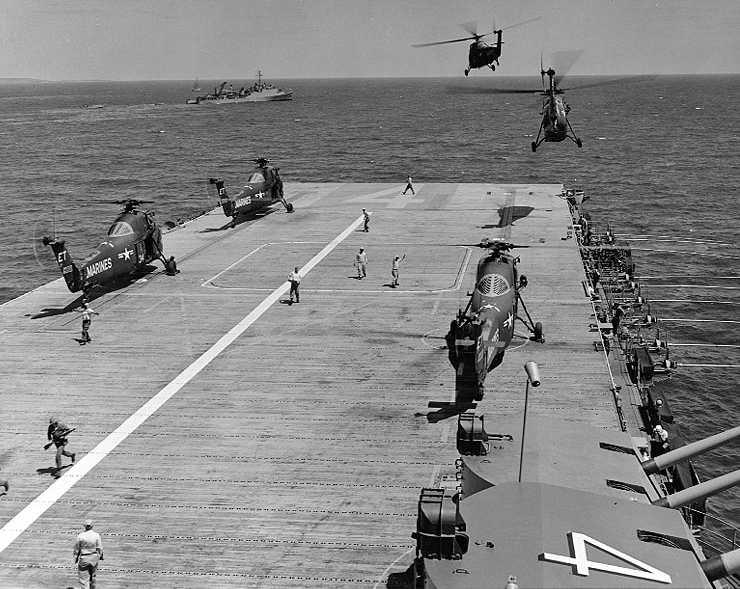
UH-34D Seahorses aboard Boxer off Vietnam in 1959

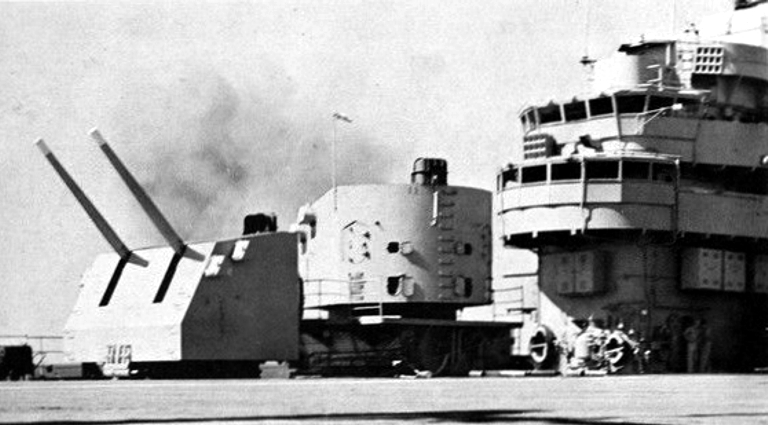
Boxer firing her forward dual 5-inch gun in 1959

== See also ==
- List of aircraft carriers
