= USS Enterprise (1799) =

US Navy schooner

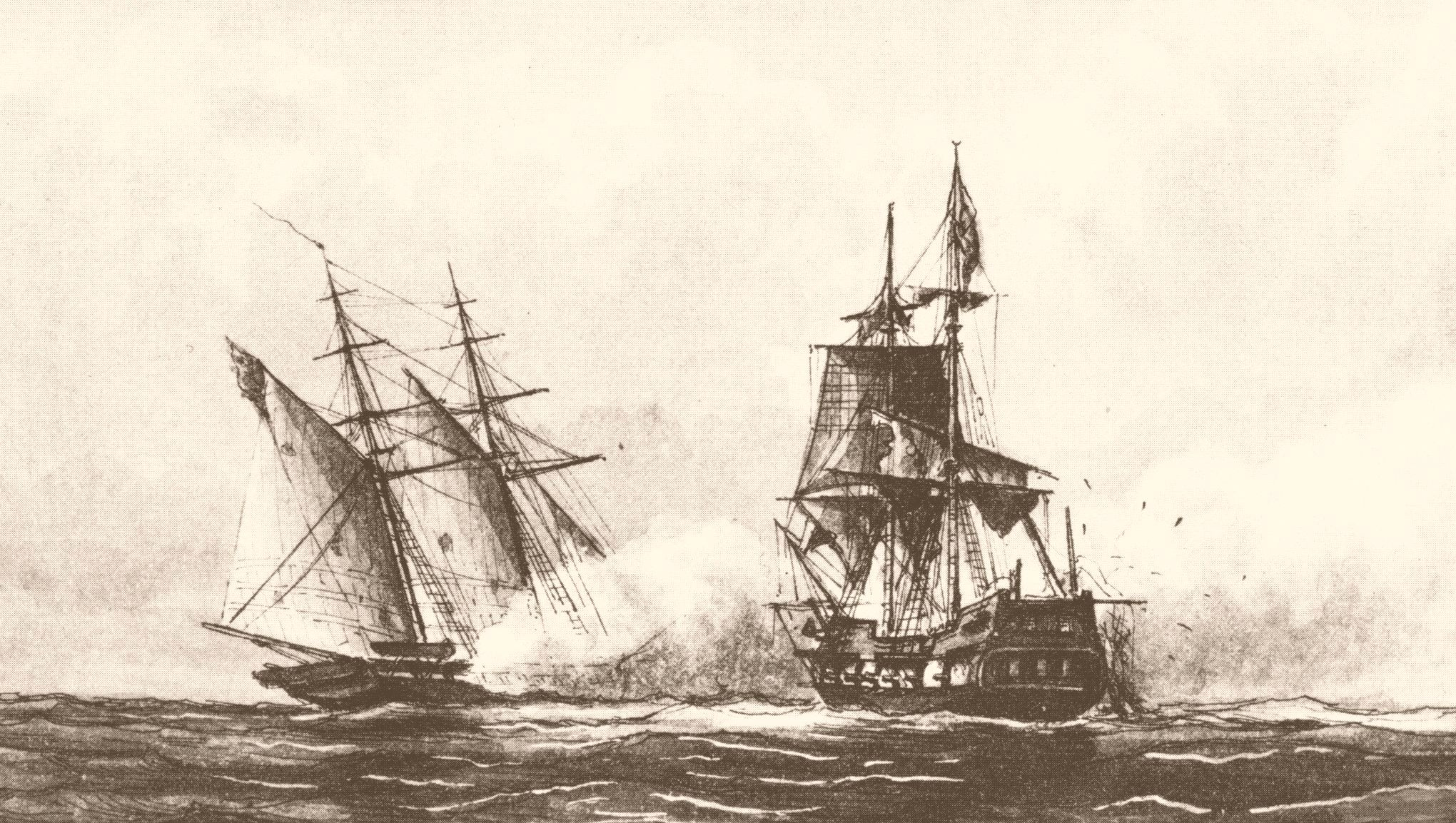
- Enterprise capturing Tripolitan Corsair. 1801

History

United States
- Name: USS Enterprise
- Builder: Henry Spencer
- Cost: $16,240
- Launched: 1799
- Fate: Lost July 9, 1823

General characteristics 1799
- Tons burthen: 135 (bm)
- Length: 84 ft 7 in (25.78 m) 60 feet at keel
- Beam: 22 ft 6 in (6.86 m)
- Draft: 9 feet 6 inches
- Depth of hold: 10 ft (3.0 m)
- Sail plan: Schooner
- Complement: 70 officers and enlisted
- Armament: 12 × 6 pounder guns (2.7 kg)

General characteristics 1800
- Tons burthen: 165 (bm)
- Length: 83 ft 6 in (25.5 m)
- Beam: 22 ft 6 in (6.9 m)
- Depth of hold: 11 ft 6 in (3.5 m)
- Armament: 14 guns

USS Enterprise was a schooner, built by Henry Spencer at Baltimore, Maryland, in 1799 for the United States Navy. Her first commander thought that she was too lightly built and that her quarters, in particular, should be bulletproofed. Enterprise was overhauled and rebuilt several times, effectively changing from a twelve-gun schooner to a fourteen-gun topsail schooner and eventually to a sixteen-gun brig. Enterprise saw action in the Caribbean, the Mediterranean, and the Caribbean again, capturing numerous prizes. She wrecked in July 1823.

== First Caribbean tour ==
Lieutenant John Shaw was commissioned as the first captain of Enterprise. On 17 December 1799, during the Quasi-War with France, Enterprise departed the Delaware Capes for the Caribbean to protect United States merchantmen from the depredations of French privateers. On 23 January she recaptured the American schooner Victory, captured 5 days earlier by the privateer Sun. The next day she recaptured another ship, the brig Androscoggin, captured 6 days earlier by the privateer La Union. She left Curacao around the end of January 1800 and on 3 February received orders from Commodore Thomas Truxtun to sail home with dispatches.

== Second Caribbean tour ==
Returning to the West Indies, on 23 April 1800, she had a brief engagement with a Spanish packet that opened fire on her, but broke off the fight upon realizing that the ship was a neutral. On 5 May, she captured the French 4-gun schooner Citoyen, which suffered 4 killed and 11 wounded. On 17 June she captured a second privateer, Le Cigne, off Guadeloupe. Le Cigne suffered 11 killed and 13 wounded. On 9 July she captured L'Aigle, and on 23 July she captured privateer Le Flambeau. the French suffered 4 killed and 29 wounded, while Enterprise had 2 wounded. On 13 August, she recaptured the American schooner Washington eight leagues northeast of Deseada, captured by privateer Le Pauline on 15 August (22°N 66°W). On 7 September, she captured the letter of marque lugger Guadaloupian. On 24 October, Captain Shaw asked to be relieved of command, due to ill health. Commodore Truxton granted his request and promoted Shaw's first officer, Lt. Andrew Sterret, to Captain. Sterret officially took command on 27 October. On 6 December, she fought a night engagement with a privateer lugger that started one league off St Bartholomew's, ending close to shore when she broke off rather than risk being wrecked on the unfamiliar island. The privateer suffered 20 killed, 30 wounded, and lost 2 masts. On 24 December, she captured her last privateer, the schooner La Amour de la Patrie, before sailing home.

In a letter dated 20 February 1801 to Josiah Parker, chairman of the Committee on Naval Affairs, Navy Secretary Benjamin Stoddert recommended selling off Enterprise to reduce naval expenses. She was placed in ordinary on 26 February while her naval stores were unloaded. She was docked at Baltimore on 17 November 1801, still up for sale, when the outbreak of war forced the Navy to hastily recommission her for service.

== First arrival in the Mediterranean ==
Enterprise sailed to the Mediterranean from Hampton Roads. The need for new masts delayed her departure until early May 1801. She sailed from Hampton Roads 1 June. The squadron she was assigned to cleared the Cape on 2 June. She reached Gibraltar on 26 June 1801, joining other American ships fighting in the First Barbary War.

=== Battle with corsair Tripoli ===
Enterprise's first action came on 1 August 1801 when, seven leagues west of Malta, she defeated the 14-gun Tripolitan polacca corsair Tripoli, after a fierce but one-sided battle. Enterprise emerged unscathed, while the battered Tripoli was dismasted and sent back into port.

The action was described in Washington City's National Intelligencer & Adv. on 18 November 1801:

NAVAL VICTORY

Yesterday captain Sterret, commander of the schooner Enterprize, part of the Mediterranean squadron, arrived here, with dispatches for the Secretary of the Navy.
Captain Sterret is bearer of dispatches from commodore Dale, which exhibit a detailed account of the proceedings and situation of the Mediterranean squadron.
On the 1st of August, the schooner Enterprize, commanded by captain Sterret, and carrying 12 six pounders and 90 men, bound to Malta for a supply of water, fell in with a Tripolitan cruizer, being a ship of 14 six pounders, manned by 80 men.
At this time the Enterprize bore British colours. Captain Sterret interrogated the commander of the Tripolitan on the object of his cruize. He replied that he came out to cruise after the Americans, and that he lamented that he had not come alongside of some of them. Captain Sterret, on this reply, hoisted American, in the room of British colours; and discharged a volley of musquetry; which the Tripolitan returned by a partial broadside.—This was the commencement of a hard fought action, which commenced at 9 am and continued for three hours.
Three times, during the action, the Tripolitan attempted to board the Enterprize, and was as often repulsed with great slaughter, which was greatly increased by the effective aid afforded by the Marines. Three times, also, the Tripolitan struck her colours, and as often treacherously renewed the action, with the hope of disabling the crew of captain Sterret, which, as is usual, when the enemy struck her colours, came on deck, and exposed themselves, while they gave three cheers as a mark of victory.
When for the third time, this treacherous attack was made, captain Sterret gave orders to sink the Tripolitan, on which a scene of furious combat ensuded, until the enemy cried for mercy.
Captain Sterret, listening to the voice of humanity, even after such perfidious conduct, ordered the captain either to come himself, or to send some of his officers on board the Enterprize. He was informed that the boat of the Tripolitan was so shattered as to be unfit for use. He asked, what security there was, that if he should send his men in his own boat, they would not be murdered?
After numerous supplications & protestations the boat was sent: The crew of the Tripolitan was discovered to be in the most deplorable state. Out of eighty men, 20 were killed, and 30 wounded. Among the killed were the second lieutenant and Surgeon; and among the wounded were the Captain and first lieutenant. And so decisive was the fire of the Enterprize that the Tripolitan was found to be in a most perilous condition, having received 18 shot between wind and water.
When we compare this great slaughter, with the fact that not a single individual of the crew of the Enterprise was in the least degree injured, we are lost in surprise at the uncommon good fortune which accompanied our seamen, and at the superior management of Captain Sterrett.
All the officers and sailors manifested the truest spirit, and sustained the greatest efforts during the engagement. All, therefore, are entitled to encomium for their valour and good conduct. The marines, especially, owing to the nearness of the vessels, which were within pistol shot of each other, were eminently useful.
After administering to the relief of the distresses of the wounded Tripolitans, and the wants of the crew, Capt. Sterrett ordered the ship of the enemy to be completely dismantled. Her masts were accordingly all cut down, and her guns thrown overboard. A spar was raised, on which was fixed, as a flag, a tattered sail; and in this condition the ship was dismissed.
On the arrival of the Tripolitan ship at Tripoli, so strong was the sensations of shame and indignation excited there, that the Bey ordered the wounded captain to be mounted on a Jack Ass, and paraded thro' the streets as an object of public scorn. After which he received 500 bastinadoes.
So thunderstruck were the Tripolitans at this event, and at the apprehended destruction of their whole marine force, that the sailors, then employed at Tripoli on board of cruisers that were fitting out by the government, all deserted them, and not a man could be procured to navigate them.

On 3 February 1802, Congress resolved that Sterett receive a commemorative sword to mark his victory; the rest of Enterprise's crew received a month's pay.

== Remainder of Mediterranean patrol ==
At Gibraltar on 3 October 1801, Enterprise was ordered to return to Baltimore with dispatches for the Secretary of the Navy. She reached American shores in November 1801. While in port, Sterett received orders on 17 November to pay off and discharge the crew. He was advised that he would receive a furlough and replaced after he oversaw the ship's refitting. Master Commandant Silas Talbot was initially set to assume command but had already resigned from the Navy in September. Sterett was ultimately retained as captain as no other suitable replacements were available. With a new crew, Enterprise sailed from Baltimore on 12 February 1801 for continued service in the Mediterranean as an escort for merchantmen.

On 16 October 1802 at Leghorn, her supply barge capsized and was lost along with a midshipman and three crewmen; the survivors were rescued by a boat from USS Constellation.

Enterprise next saw action when the war resumed in 1803, after months of carrying dispatches, convoying merchantmen, and patrolling the Mediterranean. On 17 January, she captured Paulina, a Tunisian ship under charter to the Bashaw (Pasha) of Tripoli, and on 22 May, she ran a 30-ton falucca (?) craft ashore on the coast of Tripoli during an exchange of fire with shore batteries, then fought off an attack by Tripolitan gunboats the next day. For the next month, Enterprise and other ships of the squadron cruised inshore, bombarding the coast and sending landing parties to burn small enemy vessels.

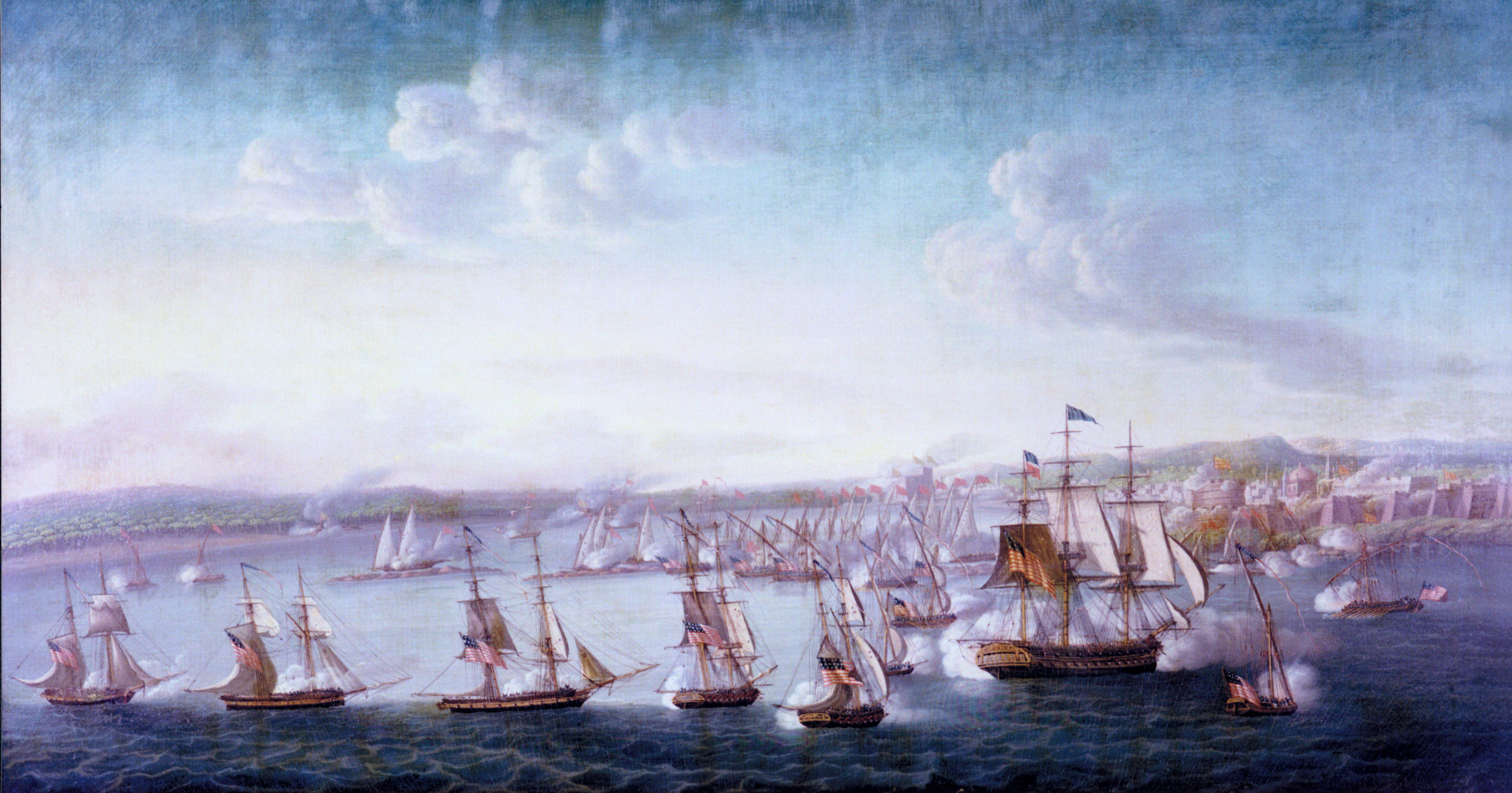
USS Enterprise (the first on the left) participating in the bombardment of Tripoli, 3 August 1804, painting by Michele Felice Cornè, 1752–1845

On 9 November 1803, Lieutenant Stephen Decatur assumed command of Enterprise, exchanging commands with Lieutenant Isaac Hull, who took command of the USS Argus. On 23 December 1803, after a quiet interval of cruising, Enterprise joined with frigate Constitution to capture the Tripolitan ketch Mastico. The captured vessel was taken back to Syracuse and refitted and renamed USS Intrepid. Decatur took command of Intrepid, while Lt. Commandant John H. Dent temporarily assumed captaincy of Enterprise. Because of her regional appearance, the ketch was well suited for making its way into Tripoli's harbor without raising suspicion and was thus used in a daring expedition to board, capture and burn the frigate Philadelphia, captured by the Tripolitans and anchored in the harbor of Tripoli. Decatur and volunteers from Enterprise carried out their mission almost perfectly, destroying the frigate and depriving Tripoli of a powerful warship. After the mission to destroy Philadelphia, Decatur resumed his original command.

Enterprise continued to patrol the Barbary Coast until July 1804, when she participated in coordinated American naval bombardments and attacks on the city of Tripoli over a period of several weeks. During this time Decatur was in command of a squadron of gunboats and mortar boats borrowed from the King of Naples, with Lt. Lawrence in command of Enterprise. Lt. Thomas Robinson is appointed Lt. Commandant in command in a letter dated 5 September, officially promoted to Master Commandant on 10 September, 1804.

On 3 November, 1804 Enterprise departed Syracuse, Sicily for extensive repairs in Venice, arriving on 20 November, she completed rebuilding and was refloated from drydock on 23 April, 1805 and resupply by May 1805. On 30 July she was with the U.S. fleet at Tunis. She resumed patrol and convoy duty until August 1807. During that period, she fought (15 August 1806) a brief engagement off Gibraltar with a group of Spanish gunboats that attacked her but which she was able to drive off. Enterprise returned to the United States in late 1807 and cruised coastal waters until June 1809. After a brief tour in the Mediterranean, she sailed to New York and was laid up for nearly a year.

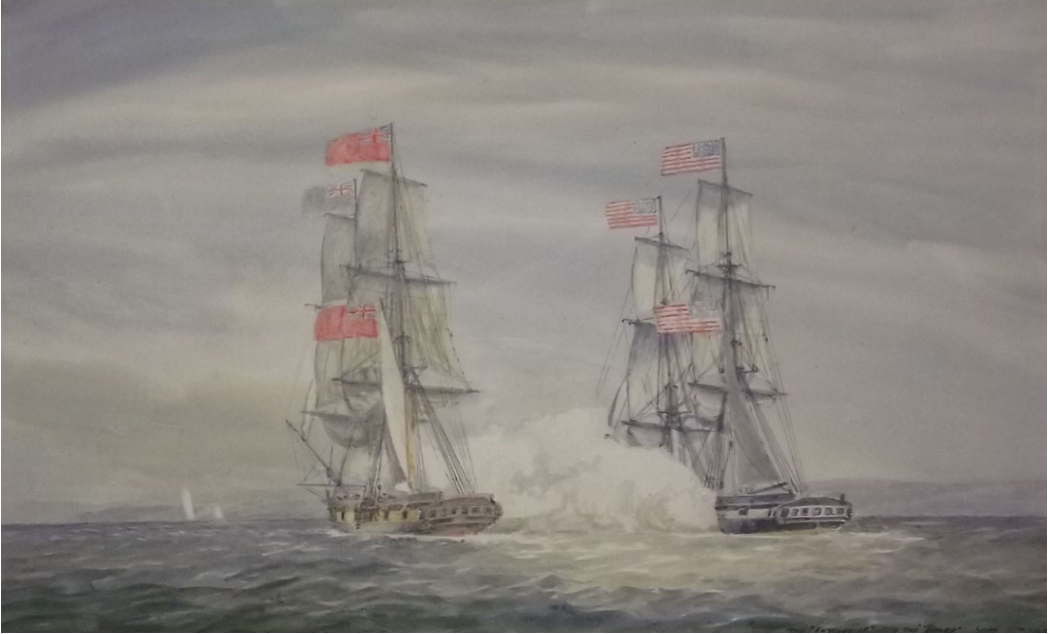
Illustration of Enterprise fighting Boxer by Irwin John David Bevan

== 1811 recommissioning ==
Repaired at the Washington Navy Yard, Enterprise was recommissioned there in April 1811, then sailed for anti-piracy operations out of Savannah, Georgia, and Charleston, South Carolina. She returned to Washington on 2 October and was hauled out of the water for extensive repairs and modifications: when she sailed on 20 May 1812, she had been rerigged as a brig.

At sea when war was declared on Britain, she cruised along the east coast during the first year of hostilities. On 5 September 1813, Enterprise sighted and chased the brig Boxer. The brigs opened fire on each other, and in a closely fought, fierce, and gallant action which claimed the lives of both commanding officers, Enterprise captured Boxer and, under the guidance of her new captain Samuel Drinkwater, took her into nearby Portland, Maine, where commandant Edward McCall oversaw a joint funeral for Lieutenant William Burrows of Enterprise, and Captain Samuel Blyth of Boxer, both well-known and highly regarded in their respective naval services. Both Burrows and Blyth were buried in the Eastern Cemetery in Portland, near the grave of Commodore Edward Preble.

On September 20, a large feast was held for her crew in Portland. Later around 12 o’clock a huge parade marched through the streets of the city. During the parade, members of the crew carried with them one of the ships flags. It described as: "...flag bearing the American Eagle, holding in his beak a scroll, with this inscription, "Free Trade and Sailors Rights," and in one talon an olive branch, in the other a linstock with a burning match..." Her crew than went to City Hall, where they were honored for their service.

== Second Caribbean patrol ==
After repairing at Portland, Enterprise sailed in company with brig Rattlesnake for the Caribbean. The two ships took three prizes before being forced to separate by a heavily armed British ship on 25 February 1814. Enterprise was compelled to jettison most of her guns in order to outsail her superior antagonist. The brig reached Wilmington, North Carolina, on 9 March 1814, then passed the remainder of the war as a guardship off Charleston, South Carolina.

== Mediterranean, New Orleans, and West Indies squadrons ==
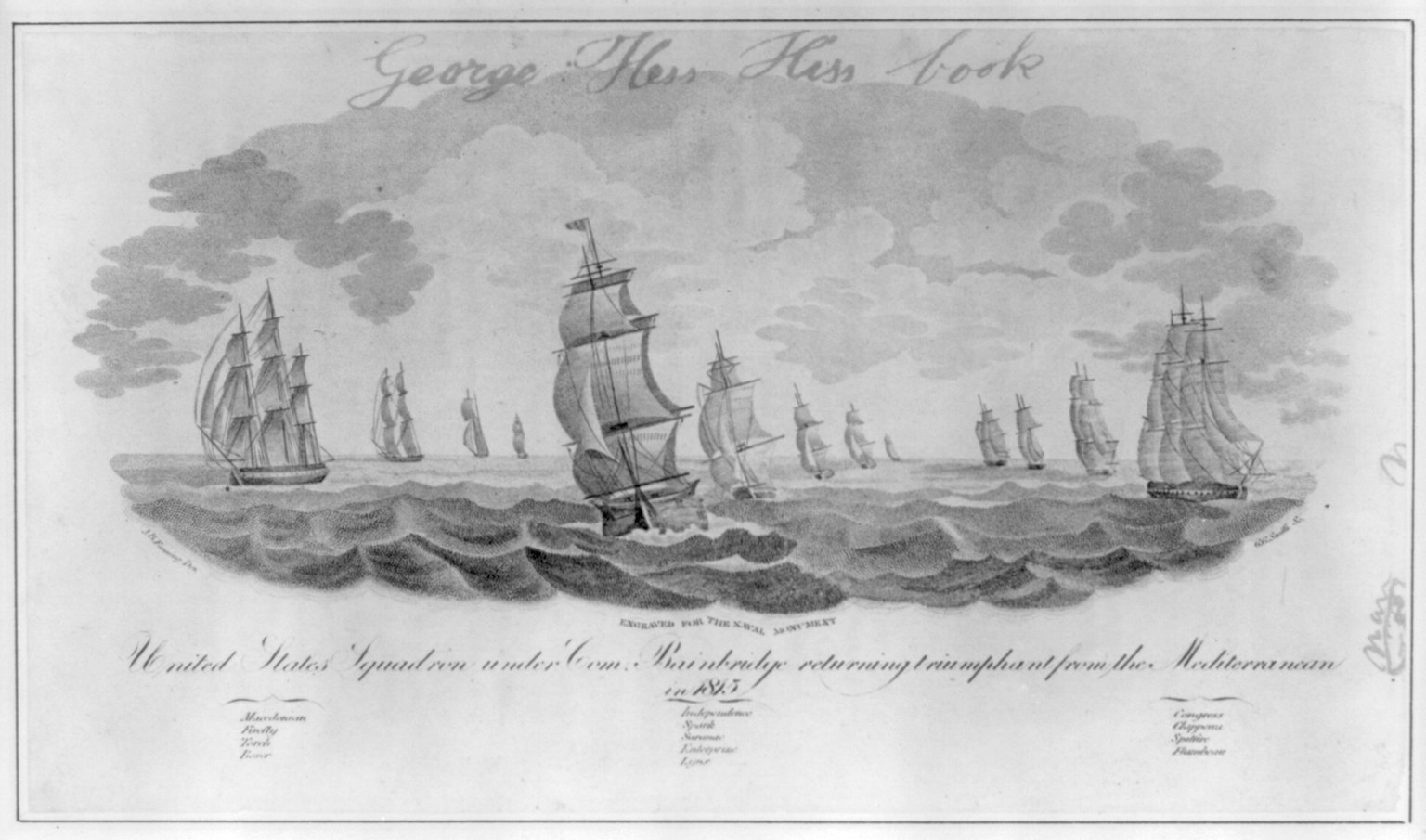
Enterprize as a part of the United States Mediterranean squadron of 1815 (Second Barbary War)

Enterprise served one more short tour in the Mediterranean Squadron (July–November 1815), then cruised the northeastern seaboard until November 1817. In 1818, she was under the command of Lieutenant Lawrence Kearny of the New Orleans station (US Navy), who evicted the pirate Jean Lafitte from Galveston, Texas. From that time on she sailed the Caribbean Sea and the Gulf of Mexico as one of the founding vessels of what later became the West Indies Squadron in 1821. She was active in suppressing pirates, smugglers, and slavers; in this duty she took thirteen prizes. An attack on Cape Antonio, Cuba in October 1821 resulted in the rescue of three vessels taken by pirates, and the breaking up of an outlaw flotilla reputedly commanded by James D. Jeffers, aka "Charles Gibbs".

== Fate ==
Enterprise's career ended on 9 July 1823, when she stranded and broke up on a reef near Little Curacao Island in the West Indies. Her crew successfully evacuated and suffered no casualties.

== Legacy ==
In honor of what is seen as her illustrious career, the ship earned the nickname "Lucky Enterprise". The yacht that defended the 1930 America's Cup was named after her, and sailed with a model of her in the captain's cabin.

Preceded by 1775	USS Enterprise; 1799–1823	Succeeded by 1831

== See also ==
- List of historical schooners
- List of ships of the United States Navy named Enterprise
- Bibliography of early American naval history
- USS Enterprise (Star Trek)

== Bibliography ==
- Hollis, Ira N. (1900). The frigate Constitution the central figure of the Navy under sail.
  Houghton, Mifflin and Company, Boston and New York; The Riverside Press, Cambridge. pp. 263. Url
- MacKenzie, Alexander Slidell (1846). Life of Stephen Decatur: a commodore in the Navy of the United States. C. C. Little and J. Brown, 1846 – Biography & Autobiography. pp. 443. Url
- Smith, Joshua (2011). Battle for the Bay: The Naval War of 1812. Fredericton, NB: Goose Lane Editions. ISBN 978-0-86492-644-9.
- Vanderbilt, Harold Stirling (1931). Enterprise: The Story of the Defense of the America's Cup in 1930. New York: Charles Scribner's Sons.
