= Lemuel Moody =

Lemuel Moody (June 30, 1767-August 11, 1846) was an American shipping company owner from Portland, Maine, United States. He is most known as the builder of the Portland Observatory, an 86-foot (26 m) tall observatory octagonal maritime signal tower atop Portland's Munjoy Hill. He was buried at Eastern Cemetery on August 12, 1846.

== Early life ==
Lemuel Moody was one of 10 children born to Enoch Moody and Ann Weeks Moody. His father died when he was 10 years old.
