= Burroughs =

Burroughs may refer to:

- Former spelling of boroughs
- Burroughs, Georgia, a historically African American community now a neighborhood of Savannah, Georgia
- Burroughs Corporation, a maker of adding machines and computers
- Burroughs (surname), people and fictional characters
- The Burroughs, a district of London
- Burroughs (crater), on Mars
- 21811 Burroughs, an asteroid
- Burroughs School (Conway, South Carolina), on the National Register of Historic Places
- Burroughs (film), a documentary about William S. Burroughs
- Burroughs visa, a type of US visa

== See also ==
- Burrows (disambiguation)
