= Burrow (disambiguation) =

A burrow is a hole made by an animal.

Burrow may also refer to:

== Places ==
- Burrow, a small mound or hillock
- Burrow (Shropshire), a hill in Shropshire, England
- Burrow-with-Burrow, a parish in Lancashire, England
- The Burrow, a fictional place in the Harry Potter series
- Eleanor R. Baldwin Arena or The Burrow, the Florida Atlantic University Arena

== Other uses ==
- Burrow (surname)
- "The Burrow" (short story), a short story by Franz Kafka
- The Burrow (novel), a novel by Melanie Cheng
- Burrowing (politics), a practice of giving jobs to political allies
- The Burrow, a supporter group for the South Sydney Rabbitohs club
- Burrow (film), a 2020 Pixar short film

== See also ==
- Burro, a small donkey
- Borough, an administrative division
- Burrows (disambiguation)
