= Milk River =

Milk River may refer to:

== Rivers ==
- Milk River (British Columbia), a tributary of the upper Fraser River in Canada
- Milk River (Michigan), United States
- Milk River (Alberta–Montana), a tributary of the Missouri River
- Milk River (Jamaica)

== Places ==
- Milk River, Alberta, a town in Canada
  - Milk River Airport, Alberta
- Milk River Ridge, Alberta, Canada
  - Milk River Ridge Reservoir, a large body of water in southern Alberta, Canada
- Milk River Bath, Jamaica

== See also ==
- Dudh Kosi, a river in eastern Nepal
- Milk (disambiguation)
