= MILC (disambiguation) =

A mirrorless interchangeable lens camera (MILC) is a type of photo camera.

MILC may also refer to:

- Metal-induced lateral crystallization (MILC)
- Milk Income Loss Contract (MILC)
- Minor League Cricket (MiLC)

== See also ==
- Milk (disambiguation)
