= Bartlett Adams =

American stonemason (1776–1828)

- Born: October 24, 1776; Kingston, Massachusetts, U.S.
- Died: January 27, 1828 (aged 51); Portland, Maine, U.S.
- Burial place: Eastern Cemetery, Portland, Maine, U.S.

Bartlett Adams (October 24, 1776 – January 27, 1828) was an American stonemason. He was the earliest stonecutter in Portland, Maine, and is known to have made around 700 grave markers in just one cemetery (Eastern Cemetery) in that city.

== Early life ==
Adams was born in 1776 in Kingston, Massachusetts, to Francis Adams and Rebecca Cook. He was one of their ten known children, alongside Lucy, Betsey, Francis Jr., Thankful, Rebecca, Hannah, Daniel, Richard and Keziah.

== Career ==
Adams was trained as a stonecutter by his brother-in-law, Bildad Washburn. After an apprenticeship, Adams used a shop in Quincy, Massachusetts, as a base to do his work. Around 35 of his grave markers can be found in cemeteries in Quincy and Milton. In 1800, after a brief stay in Portsmouth, New Hampshire, he moved to Portland, Maine, where he became the city's first stonecutter. In September 1812, he briefly sold his business to his nephew, Alvan Washburn, and traveled to Richmond, Virginia.

== Personal life ==
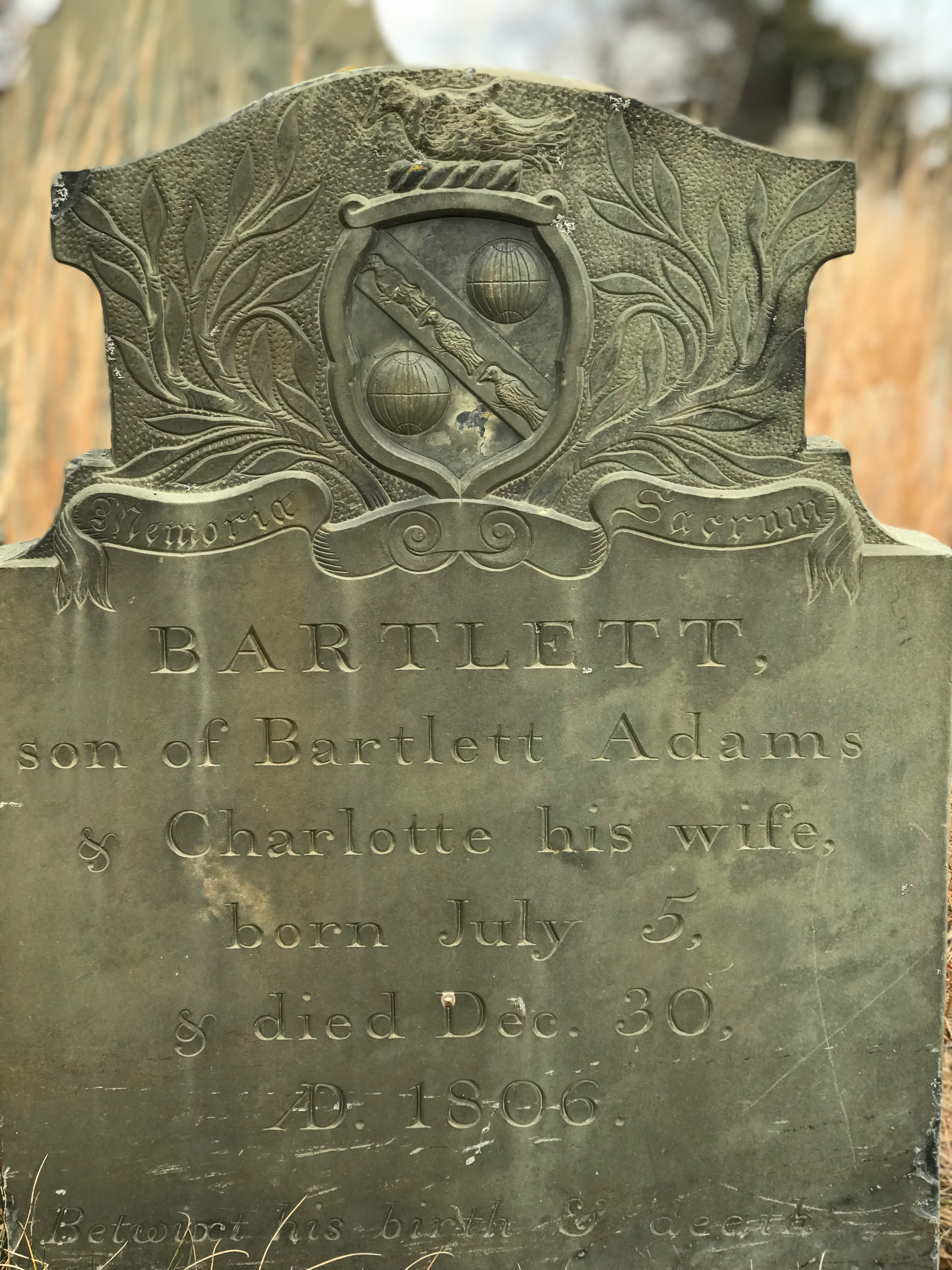
Grave marker of five-month-old Bartlett Adams Jr., made by his father in 1806

In 1803, Adams married Charlotte Neal, with whom he had seven children between 1804 and 1817: Maria, Bartlett Jr., Charlotte, George, Sarah, Eliza and Rebecca. Bartlett Jr. (five months), George and Eliza (both stillborn) died in infancy, while Sarah died aged four. Two others predeceased their parents; only Rebecca (died 1842) outlived them. Maria married Charles Rogers in 1826. She had given birth to Charles Bartlett Rogers in May 1827, just two months before her death, meaning Bartlett Adams was a grandfather for eight months, until his death.

Adams lived on Portland Neck but also owned a large farm in New Gloucester. He was largely based their during the War of 1812 due to the slowdown of his business.

== Death ==
Adams died in 1828, aged 51. He was interred in Portland's Eastern Cemetery, in which are around 700 markers made by his own hand. He and other members of his family were laid to rest in a private tomb. The table-style monument that once decorated the tomb has been lost or destroyed, though a small sandstone marker at the entrance to the tomb is still there bearing his name. His widow lived for a further nine years and was buried beside Adams upon her death, aged 57.
