= USS Burrows =

Three ships of the United States Navy have been named Burrows, in honor of William Ward Burrows II.

- USS Burrows (1814), was a galley launched in 1814 and served in the Battle of Lake Champlain.
- USS Burrows (DD-29), was a modified Paulding-class destroyer launched in 1910 and served in World War I and then served in the United States Coast Guard from 1924 to 1930.
- USS Burrows (DE-105), was a Cannon-class destroyer escort launched in 1943 and sold to The Netherlands in 1950.
