= Portland Observatory =

- U.S. National Register of Historic Places
- U.S. National Historic Landmark
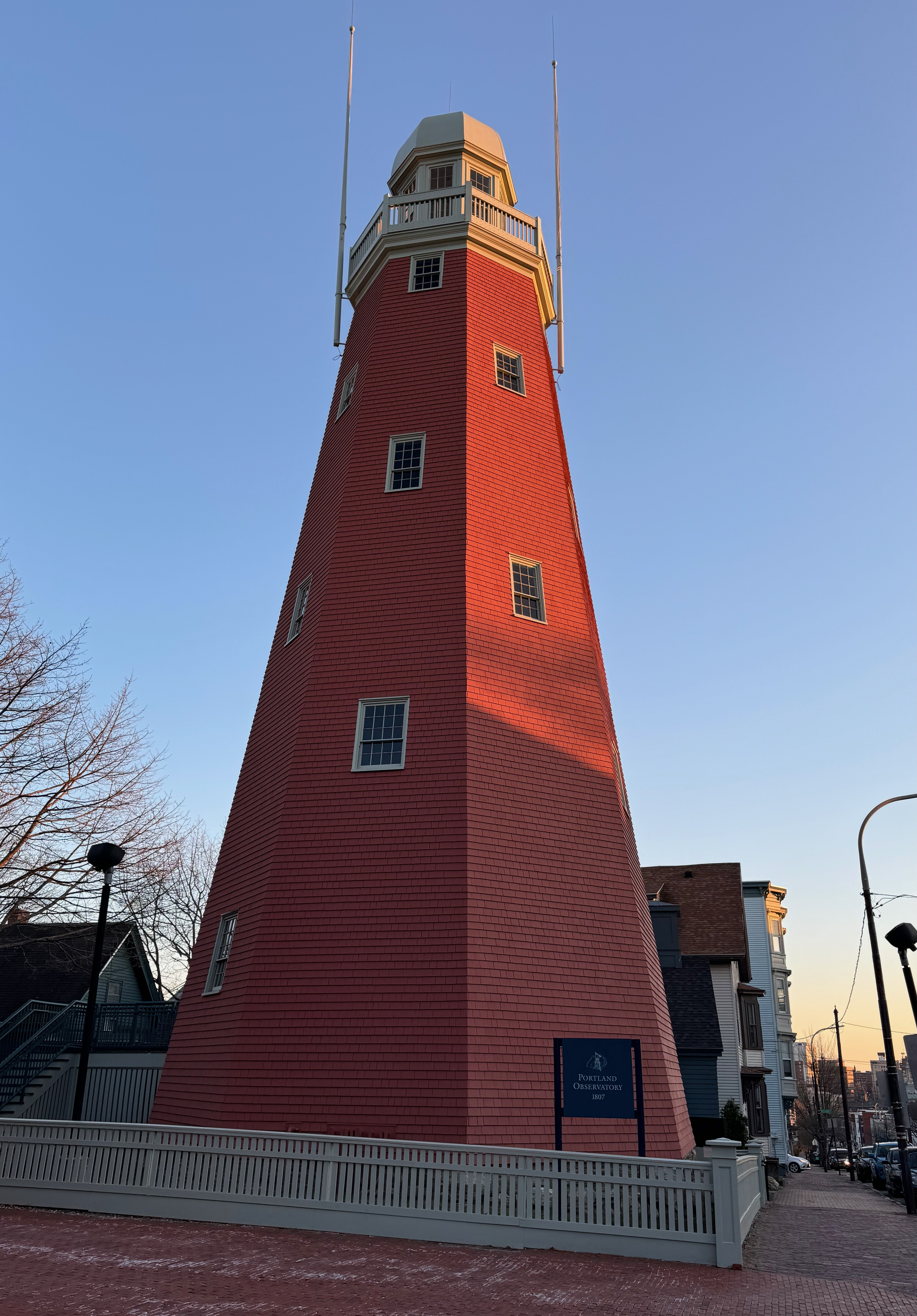
- The Portland Observatory in 2024
- Location: 138 Congress St; Portland, Maine, U.S.
- Coordinates: 43°39′55″N 70°14′54″W
- Area: less than one acre
- Built: 1807
- NRHP reference No.: 73000122

Significant dates
- Added to NRHP: April 24, 1973
- Designated NHL: February 17, 2006

The Portland Observatory is a historic maritime signal tower at 138 Congress Street in the Munjoy Hill section of Portland, Maine. Built in 1807, it is the only known surviving tower of its type in the United States. Using both a telescope and signal flags, two-way communication between ship and shore was possible several hours before an incoming vessel reached the docks. The tower was designated a National Historic Landmark and a National Historic Civil Engineering Landmark in 2006; it is now managed by Greater Portland Landmarks, a local historic preservation nonprofit. It is open to the public as a museum.

== Geography ==
Portland has a deep harbor sheltered by numerous islands. Ships entering the harbor are not directly visible from the wharfs, which created problems for merchants trying to prepare for the arrival of cargoes. This problem was solved in 1807 when Captain Lemuel Moody organized the construction of an observatory on Portland's Munjoy Hill, visible from both the open ocean and the wharfs. During the War of 1812, the observatory was used as a watch tower.

== About the observatory ==
The 86-foot (26 m) tall observatory (7 stories) is octagonal (to lessen wind pressure on each side) and lighthouse-shaped, with a fieldstone base of heavy loose rocks, and stands 222 feet (68 m) above sea level. There is no basement but the rock ballast in the bottom floor and octagonal design have kept the structure steady during storms. The observatory's 'lantern' (cupola) included a P & J Dollond Achromatic Refracting Telescope, which could identify ships 30 miles (48 km) to sea. That telescope disappeared from the observatory in 1939.

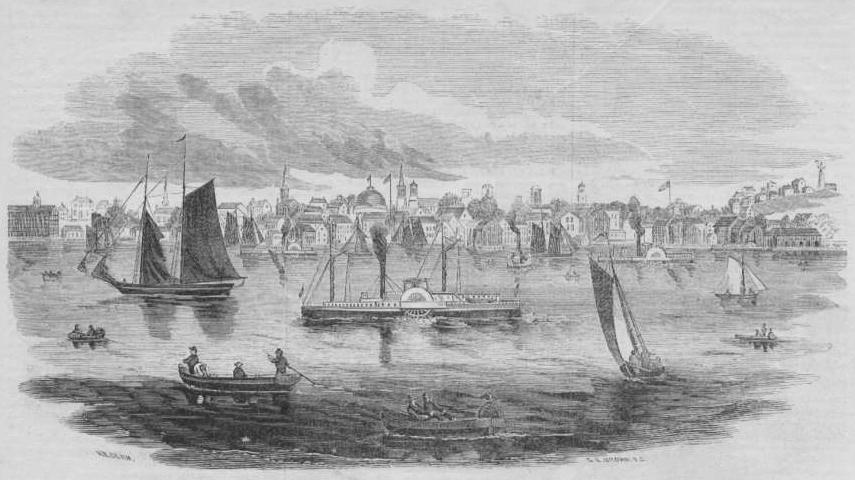
Portland from the harbor in 1853, showing the observatory at far right

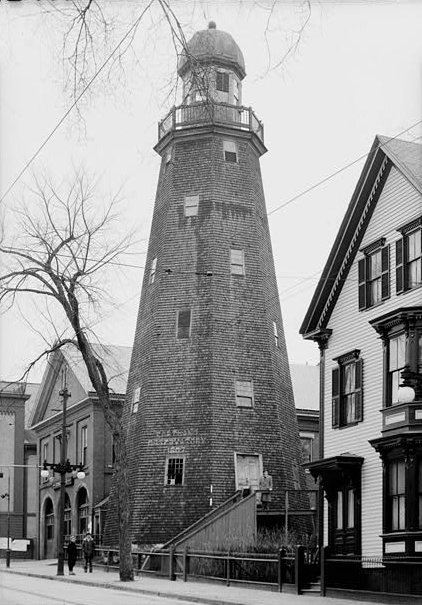
Portland Observatory in 1936

The observatory has been renovated numerous times over the years, including a Works Progress Administration renovation in 1939. It was most recently renovated from 1998–2000 to repair damage from moisture and powderpost beetles. This renovation won a 2001 National Preservation Honor Award from the National Trust for Historic Preservation. The center column was not an original feature, and was added in the 1939 renovation. In 2014 additional repairs to the windows and shingles were underway.

The observatory was placed on the National Register of Historic Places in 1972. In 2006, the observatory was made a National Historic Landmark and a National Historic Civil Engineering Landmark.

=== Past operation ===
The Portland Observatory is the only remaining maritime signal station in the United States. Tower operations were paid with annual fees collected from shipping merchants, who purchased the right to have their flags stored in the building and hoisted up its flagstaffs when their ships were sighted. A telephone was eventually installed, extending the tower's function until 1923, when the reliability of engine powered vessels and communication by radio made it obsolete.

In 1937 the tower was turned over to the city. Between the time of its closure and the 1990s, the building was often unlocked and popular among area children. Some older area residents have fond memories of playing in the building and the initials some of them carved into the wood are still visible. The latest major restoration left as much of the original wood as possible in place. This is distinguished by its dark stain while the replacement wood was left its original lighter color.

=== Current operation ===
Greater Portland Landmarks, a non-profit organization, maintains the building. Guided tours with discussion about the history of the building and the neighborhood are provided by volunteer docents from Memorial Day to Columbus Day for a small fee. On very clear days the view from the cupola's balcony extends from the seaward horizon as far inland as Mount Washington.

== See also ==
- List of towers
- List of National Historic Landmarks in Maine
- National Register of Historic Places listings in Portland, Maine
