= James Milk =

American deacon and ship's carpenter (1710–1772)

- Born: January 31, 1710
- Died: November 19, 1772 (aged 62)
- Known for: Shipbuilding

James Milk (January 31, 1710 – November 19, 1772) was an American deacon and ship's carpenter in colonial New England. He also served as a town selectman for sixteen years. Milk Street, in the Old Port of Portland, Maine, is now named for him.

== Early life ==
Milk was born in Boston, Province of Massachusetts Bay, in 1710. By the time he reached adulthood, Milk had relocated to Falmouth, province of Massachusetts Bay (today's Portland, Maine).

== Career ==
Milk apprenticed under James Gooding, who had also moved north from Boston, where he was among the earliest shipbuilders. Milk's shop was located near the foot of Exchange Street, in the heart of today's Old Port of Portland, Maine, where he worked with his son-in-law, Nathaniel. He later worked on Fish Street, which today is the northern end of Exchange Street. He was also a tanner, possibly earlier in his life.

== Personal life ==
Milk was first married to Sarah Brown, daughter of John and Elizabeth. In 1735, he remarried, to Anna Dunn Deering, a widow after the death of her first husband, John Deering Jr. His daughter, Mary, married her cousin, Moses Little. Another daughter, Dorcas, married Milk's son-in-law Nathaniel Deering. A third daughter, Eunice, married Deering's brother, John III. Milk's son, James, married Mary, a sister of the Deerings, in 1763.

== Death ==
Milk died in 1772, aged 62, having fallen ill two days earlier. He was interred in Portland's Eastern Cemetery, where his two wives are also buried.

Milk's son-in-law, Nathaniel, inherited his "considerable estate", which included a large section of the eastern side of Exchange Street in Portland.

Portland's Milk Street, which connects Exchange Street in the west to Pearl Street in the east, is named for the deacon.
