= Samuel Blyth =

Royal Navy officer

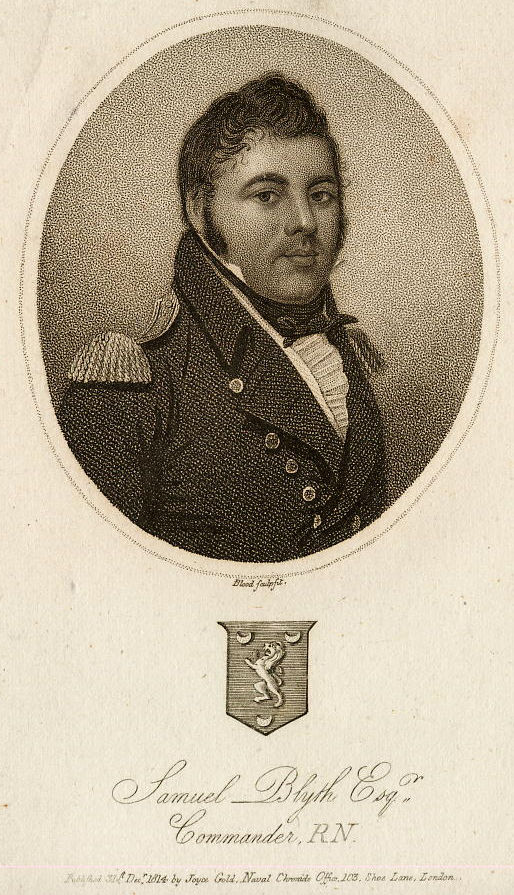
- Blyth engraving, c. 1814
- Born: 1783
- Died: 5 September 1813 (aged 29–30)
- Occupation: Sea captain

Commander Samuel Blyth (1783 – 5 September 1813) was a Royal Navy officer. He was captain of HMS Boxer during the War of 1812.

== Death ==
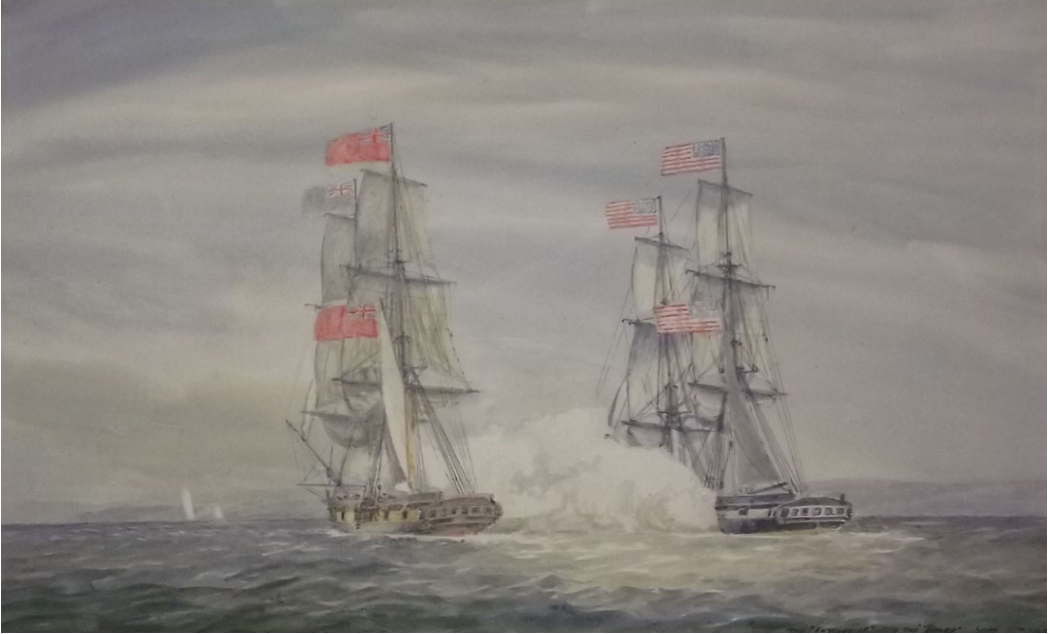
Enterprise fighting Boxer

On 5 September 1813, the USS Enterprise, under the command of Lieutenant William Ward Burrows II, fired upon HMS Boxer while it was anchored in Muscongus Bay, near Pemaquid Point, Maine. The two vessels opened fire upon each other a short while later. Blyth "was struck by an eighteen-pound shot while he was standing on the quarter-deck". The cannonball passed through his body entirely, shattering his left arm. He was killed instantly. Lieutenant David McCreery assumed command of the Boxer. Burrows was injured by a canister shot to his thigh. He remained on deck, but Lieutenant Edward McCall took command. The Boxer soon surrendered. Burrows refused to be moved until he had been killed by the enemy.

Blyth was buried in Eastern Cemetery in Portland, Maine, with full military honours at the same time and next to Burrows. The surviving officers placed a tombstone over Blyth's grave. Blyth was 29 years old; Burrows was 28. Midshipman Kervin Waters was interred beside them upon his death two years later from wounds received during the skirmish.

An image of Blyth, alongside a short account of his life, the battle and his funeral was published in the British periodical The Naval Chronicle for 1814.

=== Legacy ===
Blyth & Burrows, a bar in Portland, Maine, is named for the duo.
