= HMS Boxer (1812) =

1812 Gold-class gun-brig

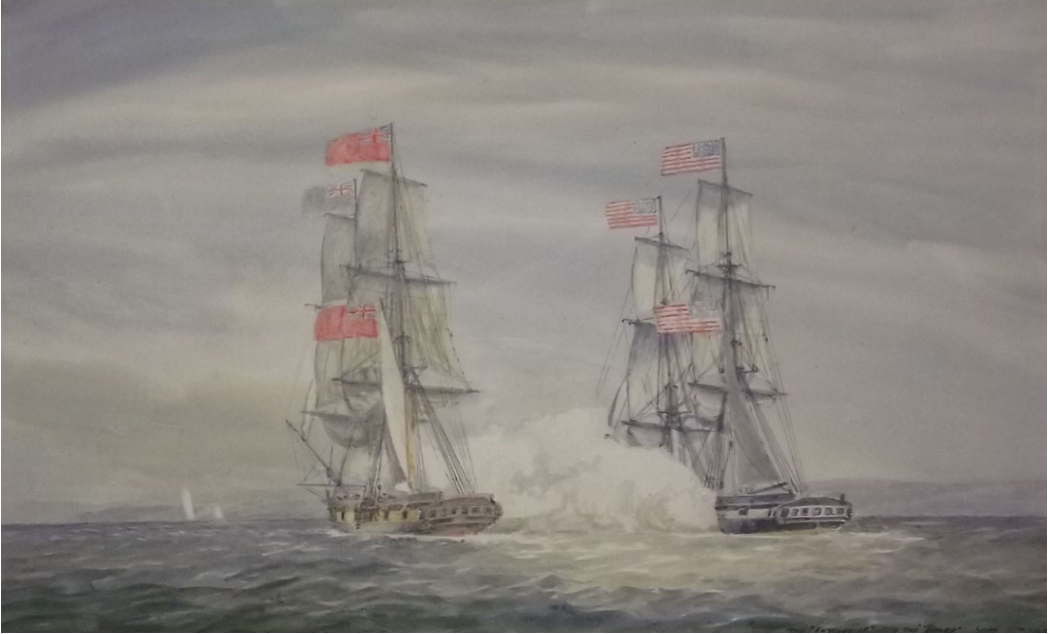
- Enterprise and Boxer

History

United Kingdom
- Name: HMS Boxer
- Ordered: 16 November 1811
- Builder: Hobbs & Hellyer, Redbridge, Hampshire
- Launched: 25 July 1812
- Commissioned: August 1812
- Captured: 5 September 1813 by USS Enterprise near Portland, Maine

United States
- Name: Boxer
- Route: North Atlantic, West Indies
- Fate: Sold as a Portuguese mail packet in 1818

Portugal
- Fate: Possibly lost on the coast of Brazil

General characteristics
- Class & type: Bold-class gun-brig
- Tons burthen: 181 67/94 (bm)
- Length: 84 ft 3 in (25.7 m) (overall); 70 ft 0 5/8 in (21.4 m) (keel)
- Beam: 22 ft 1 in (6.7 m)
- Depth of hold: 11 ft (3.35 m)
- Sail plan: Brig
- Crew: 60
- Armament: 10 × 18-pounder carronades + 2 × 6-pounder bow chasers

HMS Boxer was a 12-gun Bold-class gun-brig built and launched in July 1812. The ship had a short service history with the British Royal Navy before the 16-gun USS Enterprise captured her near Portland, Maine, in September 1813. She then went on to have at least a decade-long commercial career.

== Design and construction ==
The Bold class were a revival of Sir William Rule's Confounder-class gun-brig design of 1804. They were armed with ten 18-pounder carronades and two 6-pounder bow chasers. Built by Hobbs & Hellyer, Redbridge, Hampshire, she was launched on 25 July 1812.

== Royal Navy service off Maine ==
Commander George Rose Sartorius commissioned her in August 1812. R. Coote may have briefly commanded her before Commander Samuel Blyth took command in September; on 17 April 1813 she sailed for Halifax and service in the squadron of Sir John Borlase Warren. In Halifax, Blyth added two extra carronades to her armament. She therefore actually carried fourteen guns: twelve 18-pounder carronades and two long 6-pounders.

While coming down from New Brunswick and off the coast of Lubec, Maine, Blyth sighted and captured a small sailing craft crewed by a group of women out for a sail. He brought the women aboard and politely suggested that in the future they sail closer to the shore; he then released them. One of the women was married to the local militia commander who, impressed with Blyth’s courtesy, placed advertisements in local newspapers praising his chivalry.

In Boxer Lieutenant Blyth captured seven small vessels, most of them coasting:

- 6 July, the schooner Two Brothers, of 89 tons, from Tanfield, bound to Eastport;
- 6 July, the sloop Friendship, of 100 tons, from Blackrock bound to Eastport;
- 25 July, the sloop Fairplay;
- 27 July, the schooner Rebecca, of 86 tons, from New York and bound for Cadiz or Halifax;
- 28 July, the schooner Nancy, of 14 tons, taken in the harbour at Little River;
- 3 August, the schooner Rebecca, of 117 tons, from Townsend, bound to Boston;
- 31 August, the schooner Fortune.

== Capture by USS Enterprise ==
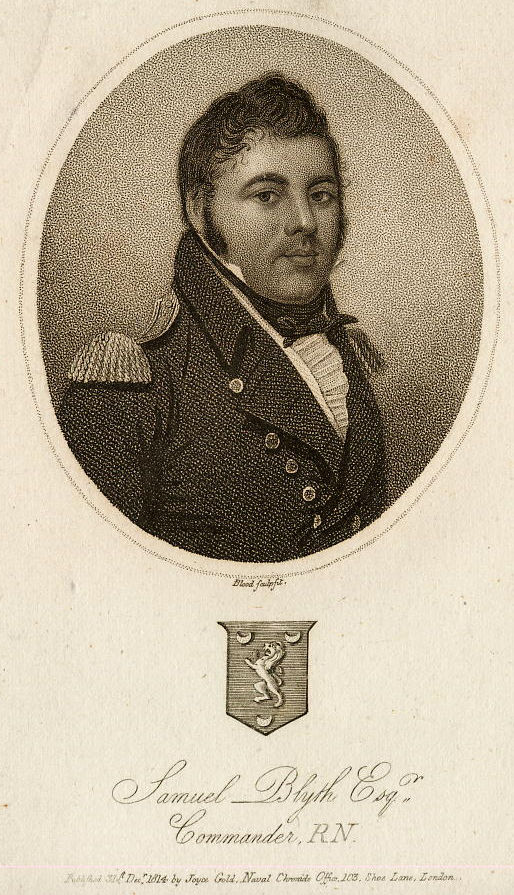
Samuel Blyth, ca. 1814, from The Naval Chronicle

On 5 September 1813, Boxer engaged the American brig Enterprise under Lieutenant William Burrows. Blyth nailed his colours to the mast and died in the first broadside. The same broadside that killed Blyth dismasted Boxer. Boxer continued to fight for another half an hour before she was forced to strike. Enterprise carried two more guns, had a heavier broadside, and had almost twice the number of men. However, the key factor was the dismasting of the Boxer, which allowed Enterprise to maneuver to rake her. Furthermore, a court martial later found that a number of British seamen had deserted their quarters during the action.

Blyth was buried in Portland with full military honours at the same time and next to Burrows, who had also died in the action. The surviving officers placed a tombstone over Blyth's grave. He was 29 years old; Burrows was 28.

== Mercantile service ==
Boxer was sold at auction in Portland, Maine, to Thomas Merrill, Jr., for US$5,600. Her guns and ballast were sold at the same time, the whole proceeds amounting to US$9,755. Burrow's heirs received US$1,115; each seaman's share of the prize money was US$55. Some of her spare spars and rigging went to equip the Mercator.

Boxer's guns went to arm the Maine privateer Hyder Ali. Hyder Ali did not have much luck either. She captured two prizes that the British retook before they could reach Maine and was herself then captured in May 1814 near the Nicobar Islands by Owen Glendower.

Initially Boxer was pressed into service to defend Portland harbour. After the war she went on to sail as a merchantman for several years. Her first voyage was in April 1815. Under Captain William McLellan, Jr. (1776–1844), she sailed to Havana, New York, Cadiz, Gibraltar, Marseilles, and back to New York before returning to Portland in early 1816. Subsequent shorter cruises under McLellan, Hall, or William Merrill took her along the coast, or to the West Indies. Around 1818 Merrill sold Boxer to a Portuguese firm that used her as a mail packet between Portuguese Cape Verde and Lisbon. Merrill reported that in 1825 he passed Boxer leaving Praia at dusk as he entered the harbour on his vessel John. It is suggested that Boxer was finally lost on the coast of Brazil.

== See also ==
For later United States Navy warships named after the captured HMS Boxer, see: USS Boxer
