= List of ship launches in 1910 =

The list of ship launches in 1910 includes a chronological list of some ships launched in 1910.

| Date | Ship | Class / type | Builder | Location | Country | Notes |
|---|---|---|---|---|---|---|
| 8 January | U-5 | U-5 type submarine | Germaniawerft | Kiel | Germany | For Imperial German Navy. |
| 15 January | Wolverine | Beagle-class destroyer | Cammell Laird | Birkenhead | United Kingdom | For Royal Navy. |
| 27 January | Edinburgh Castle | Ocean liner | Harland and Wolff | Belfast | United Kingdom | For Union-Castle Line |
| 7 February | Sant'-Anna | Sant'Anna-class [steamship] | Forges et Chantiers de la Méditerranée | La Seyne | France | For Cie. Française de Navigation à Vapeur |
| 10 February | Giffard | Pluviôse-class submarine | Arsenal de Rochefort | Rochefort | France | For French Navy |
| 19 February | Scorpion | Beagle-class destroyer | Fairfield Shipbuilding and Engineering Company | Govan, Scotland | United Kingdom | For Royal Navy. |
| 22 February | U-9 | U-9 type submarine | Kaiserliche Werft | Danzig | Germany | For Imperial German Navy. |
| 23 February | Bristol | Town-class cruiser | John Brown & Company | Clydebank | United Kingdom | For Royal Navy. |
| 24 February | N.E.R. No. 13 | Hopper barge | Blyth Shipbuilding & Dry Docks Co. Ltd | Blyth | United Kingdom | For North Eastern Railway. |
| 26 February | V184 | S138-class torpedo boat | AG Vulcan | Stettin | Germany | For Imperial German Navy. |
| 9 March | Undine | | Neptun Werft | Rostock | Germany | |
| 12 March | Georgios Averof | Pisa-class armored cruiser | Cantiere navale fratelli Orlando | Livorno, Italy | Italy | For Royal Hellenic Navy. |
| 17 March | Gay-Lussac | Pluviôse-class submarine | Arsenal de Toulon | Toulon | France | For French Navy |
| 7 April | Moltke | Moltke-class battlecruiser | Blohm + Voss | Hamburg | Germany | For Imperial German Navy |
| 9 April | Colossus | Colossus-class battleship | Scotts | Greenock | United Kingdom | For Royal Navy. |
| 9 April | Perkins | Paulding-class destroyer | Fore River Shipbuilding Company | Quincy, Massachusetts | United States | For United States Navy. |
| 12 April | Paulding | Paulding-class destroyer | Bath Iron Works | Bath, Maine | United States | For United States Navy. |
| 12 April | Vergniaud | Danton-class battleship | Forges et Chantiers de la Gironde | Lormont | France | For French Navy. |
| 12 April | Zrínyi | Radetzky-class battleship | Stabilimento Tecnico Triestino | Trieste | Austria-Hungary | For Austro-Hungarian Navy |
| 12 April | V185 | S138-class torpedo boat | AG Vulcan | Stettin | Germany | For Imperial German Navy. |
| 7 May | Cyclops | Collier | William Cramp & Sons | Philadelphia | United States | For United States Navy. |
| 10 May | Hercules | Colossus-class battleship | Palmers | Jarrow | United Kingdom | For Royal Navy. |
| 12 May | Florida | Florida-class battleship | New York Naval Shipyard | Brooklyn | United States | For United States Navy. |
| 12 May | Sterett | Paulding-class destroyer | Fore River Shipbuilding Company | Quincy, Massachusetts | United States | For United States Navy. |
| 18 May | U-6 | U-5 type submarine | Germaniawerft | Kiel | Germany | For Imperial German Navy. |
| 21 May | Highland Corrie | Passenger/cargo liner | Russell & Co | Port Glasgow | United Kingdom | For Nelson Line |
| 26 May | Pakeha | Cargo ship | Harland & Wolff | Belfast | United Kingdom | For Shaw Savill Line. |
| 4 June | McCall | Paulding-class destroyer | New York Shipbuilding Company | Camden, New Jersey | United States | For United States Navy. |
| 7 June | Accrington | Passenger/cargo liner | Earle's Shipbuilding | Hull | United Kingdom | For Great Central Railway |
| 10 June | Cameleon | Acorn-class destroyer | Fairfield Shipbuilding and Engineering Company | Govan, Scotland | United Kingdom | For Royal Navy. |
| 18 June | Warrington | Paulding-class destroyer | William Cramp & Sons | Philadelphia | United States | For United States Navy. |
| 23 June | Burrows | Paulding-class destroyer | New York Shipbuilding Company | Camden, New Jersey | United States | For United States Navy. |
| 23 June | Mayrant | Paulding-class destroyer | William Cramp & Sons | Philadelphia | United States | For United States Navy. |
| 30 June | Oldenburg | Helgoland-class battleship | Kaiserliche Werft | Wilhelmshaven | Germany | For Imperial German Navy |
| 7 July | Vendémiaire | Pluviôse-class submarine | Arsenal de Cherbourg | Cherbourg | France | For French Navy |
| 7 July | Ellerbeck | Cargo ship | Blyth Shipbuilding & Dry Docks Co. Ltd | Blyth | United Kingdom | For Sharp Steamship Co. Ltd. |
| 7 July | Gloucestershire | Passenger ship | Harland & Wolff | Belfast | United Kingdom | For Bibby Steamship Co. |
| 7 July | Troll | Draug-class destroyer | Royal Norwegian Navy's shipyard | Horten | Norway | For Royal Norwegian Navy |
| 9 July | Brittany | Passenger ship | Earle's Shipbuilding | Hull | United Kingdom | For London, Brighton and South Coast Railway |
| 12 July | Goldfinch | Acorn-class destroyer | Fairfield Shipbuilding and Engineering Company | Govan, Scotland | United Kingdom | For Royal Navy. |
| 28 July | U-7 | U-5 type submarine | Germaniawerft | Kiel | Germany | For Imperial German Navy. |
| 6 August | Lion | Lion-class battlecruiser | HM Dockyard | Devonport | United Kingdom | For Royal Navy. |
| 6 August | Highland Brae | Passenger/cargo liner | Cammell Laird | Birkenhead | United Kingdom | For Nelson Line |
| 20 August | Orion | Orion-class battleship | HM Dockyard | Portsmouth | United Kingdom | For Royal Navy. |
| 20 August | Dante Alighieri | Dreadnought battleship | Castellammare Royal Dockyard | Castellamare di Stabia | Italy | For Regia Marina. |
| 22 August | Drayton | Paulding-class destroyer | Bath Iron Works | Bath, Maine | United States | For United States Navy. |
| 22 August | Roe | Paulding-class destroyer | Newport News Shipbuilding Company | Newport News, Virginia | United States | For United States Navy. |
| 25 August | Preussen | Passenger ship | Harland & Wolff | Belfast | United Kingdom | For Hamburg America Line. |
| 25 August | Casque | Bouclier-class destroyer | Forges et Chantiers de la Méditerranée | Le Havre | France | For the French Navy |
| 4 September | Charles Brun | Submarine | Arsenal de Toulon | Toulon | France | For French Navy |
| 9 September | Registan | Cargo ship | William Gray & Company | West Hartlepool, County Durham | United Kingdom | For Anglo-Algerian Steamship Co. (1896) Ltd. |
| 20 September | Ammen | Paulding-class destroyer | New York Shipbuilding Company | Camden, New Jersey | United States | For United States Navy. |
| 20 September | Falmouth | Town-class cruiser | William Beardmore and Company | Glasgow | United Kingdom | For Royal Navy. |
| 20 September | Freienfels | Cargo ship | Joh. C. Tecklenborg AG | Wesermünde | Germany | For Deutsche Dampfschiffahrts-Gesellschaft "Hansa" |
| 20 October | Olympic | Ocean liner | Harland and Wolff | Belfast | United Kingdom | Sister ship of RMS Titanic |
| 22 September | Themistocles | Passenger ship | Harland & Wolff | Belfast | United Kingdom | For Aberdeen Line. |
| 12 October | Syndic | Cargo ship | Blyth Shipbuilding & Dry Docks Co. Ltd | Blyth | United Kingdom | For . |
| 20 October | Olympic | Passenger ship | Harland & Wolff | Belfast | United Kingdom | For White Star Line. |
| 25 August | Marquise de Lubersac | Marquise de Lubersac-class Riverine steamship | Forges et Chantiers de la Méditerranée | La Seyne | France | For Soc. Anonyme des Transports Maritimes et Fluviaux |
| 21 October | Ville de Marseille | Steamship | Forges et Chantiers de la Méditerranée | Le Havre | France | For Cie. Havraise Péninsulaire de Navigation à Vapeur |
| 3 November | Walke | Paulding-class destroyer | Fore River Shipbuilding Company | Quincy, Massachusetts | United States | For United States Navy. |
| 5 November | G192 | S138-class torpedo boat | Germaniawerft | Kiel | Germany | For Imperial German Navy. |
| 17 November | Sachsen | Passenger ship | Harland & Wolff | Belfast | United Kingdom | For Hamburg America Line. |
| 18 November | Weymouth | Town-class cruiser | Armstrong Whitworth | Elswick | United Kingdom | For Royal Navy. |
| 28 November | V186 | S138-class torpedo boat | AG Vulcan | Stettin | Germany | For Imperial German Navy. |
| 1 December | Angora | Cargo liner | William Denny and Brothers | Dumbarton | United Kingdom | For British India Steam Navigation Company |
| 10 December | G193 | S138-class torpedo boat | Germaniawerft | Kiel | Germany | For Imperial German Navy. |
| 14 December | Dartmouth | Town-class cruiser | Vickers Limited | | United Kingdom | For Royal Navy. |
| 15 December | Bayern | Passenger ship | Harland & Wolff | Belfast | United Kingdom | For Hamburg America Line. |
| 17 December | Maloja | Passenger ship | Harland & Wolff | Belfast | United Kingdom | For Peninsular & Oriental Steam Navigation Company. |
| 19 December | Newhaven | Steamship | Forges et Chantiers de la Méditerranée | Le Havre | France | For Chemins de Fer de l'État Français |
| 20 December | Trippe | Paulding-class destroyer | Bath Iron Works | Bath, Maine | United States | For United States Navy. |
| Unknown date | Amiable | Steam drifter | Beeching Brothers Ltd. | Great Yarmouth | United Kingdom | For William Crome Jr. |
| Unknown date | Calistoga | Steam drifter | Beeching Brothers Ltd. | Great Yarmouth | United Kingdom | For James Bloomfield. |
| Unknown date | Delite | Lighter | Brown & Clapson | Barton-upon-Humber | United Kingdom | For Humber Lighterage Co. Ltd. |
| Unknown date | Dory | Barge | I. J. Abdela & Mitchell Ltd. | Queensferry | United Kingdom | For Rea Transport Co. Ltd. |
| Unknown date | E.J.M. | Steam drifter | Beeching Brothers Ltd. | Great Yarmouth | United Kingdom | For Robert Milburn. |
| Unknown date | Esturia | Oil tanker | Armstrong Whitworth & Company | Walker, Newcastle upon Tyne | United Kingdom | |
| Unknown date | Intaba | Steamship | Hall, Russel & Co. Ltd. | Aberdeen | United Kingdom | For John T. Rennie & Co. |
| Unknown date | Johnathan Holt | Cargo ship | | | United Kingdom | For John Holt & Co (Liverpool) Ltd. |
| Unknown date | Louie Rigby | Fishing vessel | J. & J. Armour | Fleetwood | United Kingdom | For Thomas Rigby and others. |
| Unknown date | Paradox II | Steam drifter | Beeching Brothers Ltd. | Great Yarmouth | United Kingdom | For Walter Haylett. |
| Unknown date | R. Mackay | Steam drifter | Beeching Brothers Ltd. | Great Yarmouth | United Kingdom | For Pitchers Ltd. |
| Unknown date | Rotherhill | cargo ship | Richardson, Duck & Co. Ltd. | Stockton-on-Tees | United Kingdom | For private owner. |
| Unknown date | Saskatoon | Cargo ship | Sunderland Shipbuilding Co. | Sunderland | United Kingdom | For private owner. |
| Unknown date | Silatch | Icebreaker | W. Crichton | Saint Petersburg | Russia | |
| Unknown date | Skibo Castle | Steam drifter | Beeching Brothers Ltd. | Great Yarmouth | United Kingdom | For Isaac Milne. |
| Unknown date | Speculation | Lighter | Brown & Clapson | Barton-upon-Humber | United Kingdom | For John Charles Raper. |
| Unknown date | Thomas Holt | Cargo ship | | | United Kingdom | For John Holt & Co (Liverpool) Ltd. |
| Unknown date | Wasp | Steel-hulled motorboat | Superior Shipbuilding Company | Duluth, Minnesota | United States | |
| Unknown date | Young Henry | Steam drifter | Beeching Brothers Ltd. | Great Yarmouth | United Kingdom | For Richard Sutton. |
| Unknown date | Unnamed | Naval sloop | I. J. Abdela & Mitchell Ltd. | Queensferry | United Kingdom | For Royal Navy. |
| Unknown date | Unnamed | Motor vessel | I. J. Abdela & Mitchell Ltd. | Queensferry | United Kingdom | For private owner. |
| Unknown date | Unnamed | Motor vessel | I. J. Abdela & Mitchell Ltd. | Queensferry | United Kingdom | For private owner. |
| Unknown date | Unnamed | Motor vessel | I. J. Abdela & Mitchell Ltd. | Queensferry | United Kingdom | For private owner. |
| Unknown date | Unnamed | Sailing ship | I. J. Abdela & Mitchell Ltd. | Queensferry | United Kingdom | For private owner. |
| Unknown date | Unnamed | Motor vessel | I. J. Abdela & Mitchell Ltd. | Queensferry | United Kingdom | For private owner. |
| Unknown date | Unnamed | Motor vessel | I. J. Abdela & Mitchell Ltd. | Queensferry | United Kingdom | For private owner. |
| Unknown date | Unnamed | Steamship | I. J. Abdela & Mitchell Ltd. | Queensferry | United Kingdom | For private owner. |
| Unknown date | Unnamed | Sailing ship | I. J. Abdela & Mitchell Ltd. | Queensferry | United Kingdom | For private owner. |
| Unknown date | Unnamed | Steamship | I. J. Abdela & Mitchell Ltd. | Queensferry | United Kingdom | For private owner. |
| Unknown date | Unnamed | Lighter | Brown & Clapson | Barton-upon-Humber | United Kingdom | For Great Central Railway. |
| Unknown date | Unnamed | Lighter | Brown & Clapson | Barton-upon-Humber | United Kingdom | For Great Central Railway. |
