= List of ship commissionings in 1910 =

The list of ship commissionings in 1910 is a chronological list of ships commissioned in 1910. In cases where no official commissioning ceremony was held, the date of service entry may be used instead.

| Date | Operator | Ship | Class and type | Notes |
|---|---|---|---|---|
| January 4 | United States Navy | Michigan | South Carolina-class battleship | |
| February 10 | United States Navy | Lamson | Smith-class destroyer | |
| February 10 | United States Navy | Moccasin | Plunger-class submarine | Recommissioned at Olongapo, Philippines |
| March 1 | United States Navy | South Carolina | South Carolina-class battleship | |
| March 1 | Royal Navy | Vanguard | St Vincent-class battleship | |
| April 4 | United States Navy | Delaware | Delaware-class battleship | |
| April 11 | United States Navy | North Dakota | Delaware-class battleship | |
| April 19 | Royal Navy | Collingwood | St Vincent-class battleship | |
| April 30 | Imperial German Navy | Rheinland | Nassau-class battleship | |
| May 3 | Royal Navy | St Vincent | St Vincent-class battleship | |
| May 19 | United States Navy | Abarenda | Collier | Under command of Whitney L. Eisler |
| May 31 | Imperial German Navy | Posen | Nassau-class battleship | |
| June 5 | Austro-Hungarian Navy | Erzherzog Franz Ferdinand | Radetzky-class battleship | |
| June 21 | Imperial German Navy | Kolberg | Kolberg-class cruiser | |
| September 1 | Imperial German Navy | Von der Tann | Unique battlecruiser | |
| September 29 | United States Navy | Paulding | Paulding-class destroyer | |
| October 1 | Imperial German Navy | Augsburg | Kolberg-class cruiser | |
| October 8 | Spanish Navy | Reina Regente | Protected cruiser | |
| October 18 | United States Navy | Terry | Paulding-class destroyer | |
| October 29 | United States Navy | Drayton | Paulding-class destroyer | |
| October 29 | United States Navy | Roe | Paulding-class destroyer | |
| November 18 | United States Navy | McCall | Paulding-class destroyer | |
| November 18 | United States Navy | Perkins | Paulding-class destroyer | |
| December 15 | United States Navy | Sterett | Paulding-class destroyer | |
