= USS McCall =

Two ships of the United States Navy have been named USS McCall for Edward McCall.

- USS McCall (DD-28) was a modified Paulding-class destroyer launched in 1910 and served in World War I. She served in the United States Coast Guard from 1924 to 1930. She was sold in 1934.
- USS McCall (DD-400) was a Gridley-class destroyer launched in 1937, served in World War II and was decommissioned in 1945.
