= USS Warrington (DD-30) =

Paulding-class destroyer

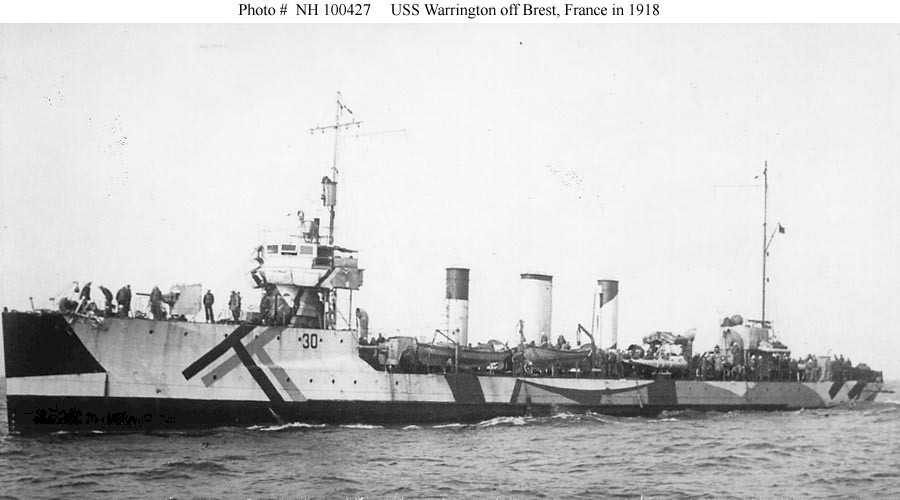
- USS Warrington (DD-30) off Brest, France in 1918, while painted in pattern camouflage.

History

United States
- Name: Warrington
- Namesake: Commodore Lewis Warrington
- Builder: William Cramp & Sons, Philadelphia
- Cost: $663,596.86
- Yard number: 352
- Laid down: 21 June 1909
- Launched: 18 June 1910
- Sponsored by: Mrs. Richard Hatton
- Commissioned: 20 March 1911
- Decommissioned: 31 January 1920
- Stricken: 20 March 1935
- Identification: Hull symbol:DD-30; Code letters:NWD
- Fate: Sold to M. Black & Co., Norfolk, Va., on 28 June 1935 for scrapping

General characteristics
- Class & type: Paulding-class destroyer
- Displacement: 742 long tons (754 t) normal; 887 long tons (901 t) full load
- Length: 293 ft 10 in (89.56 m)
- Beam: 27 ft (8.2 m)
- Draft: 8 ft 4 in (2.54 m) (mean)
- Installed power: 12,000 ihp (8,900 kW)
- Propulsion: 4 × boilers; 2 × Parsons Direct Drive Turbines; 2 × shafts
- Speed: 29.5 kn (33.9 mph; 54.6 km/h); 30.12 kn (34.66 mph; 55.78 km/h) (Speed on Trial)
- Complement: 4 officers 87 enlisted
- Armament: 5 × 3 in (76 mm)/50 caliber guns; 6 × 18 inch (450 mm) torpedo tubes (3 × 2)

The first USS Warrington (DD-30) was a modified Paulding-class destroyer in the United States Navy during World War I. She was named for Lewis Warrington.

Warrington was laid down on 21 June 1909 at Philadelphia by the William Cramp & Sons Ship & Engine Building Company; launched on 18 June 1910; sponsored by Mrs. Richard Hatton; and commissioned on 20 March 1911.

== Pre-World War I ==
After fitting out at the Philadelphia Navy Yard, Warrington moved on 5 August to the Torpedo Station at Newport, Rhode Island, where she loaded torpedoes in preparation for training with the Atlantic Torpedo Fleet. During most of the fall and early winter, the warship conducted battle drills and practice torpedo firings with the submarines and destroyers of the torpedo fleet. She also joined the cruisers and battleships of the Atlantic Fleet for training in broader combat maneuvers. Those training evolutions took her as far north as Cape Cod, Massachusetts, and as far south as Cuba.

On 27 December 1911, the destroyer departed Charleston, South Carolina, in company with the ships of Destroyer Divisions 8 and 9, bound for Hampton Roads. At about 1240 the following morning, the two divisions of destroyers reached the vicinity of the Virginia capes. Suddenly, an unidentified schooner knifed her way through the darkness and mist, struck Warrington aft, and sliced off about 30 ft (9.1 m) of her stern. The collision deprived her of all propulsion and forced her to anchor at sea some 17 mi (27 km) off Cape Hatteras. Sterett responded to her distress call first; but, soon, Walke and Perkins joined the vigil. The three ships struggled through the morning and forenoon watches to pass a towline to their stricken sister, but it was not until the revenue cutter Onondaga arrived at 1300 that the latter ship succeeded in taking Warrington in tow. The revenue cutter towed her into the Norfolk Navy Yard where she was placed in reserve while undergoing repairs which were not completed until 2 December 1912.

Upon her return to active service, Warrington resumed operations with the torpedo forces assigned to the Atlantic Fleet, by then designated the Atlantic Torpedo Flotilla. For a little over four years, she plied the eastern coastal waters of the United States, participating in various gunnery drills and torpedo-firing practices with the torpedo flotilla as well as in fleet maneuvers and battle problems with the assembled Atlantic Fleet. During part of that interlude, the destroyer was based at Newport and worked out of Boston, Massachusetts during the remainder.

Warrington was ordered to Bar Harbor, Maine and entered the port with USRC Androscoggin to prevent unauthorized departure of foreign vessels but primarily to protect the transfer of gold and silver, as well as all mail and passengers, from Kronprinzessin Cecilie to shore to be transported by train to New York. The two ships arrived at Bar Harbor on 6 August 1914 with wild speculation in the press.

Warrington ran aground on 20 May 1916 at Rockport, Massachusetts, prompting a board of investigation ordered by the Commander, Destroyer Flotilla, Atlantic Fleet. Her commanding officer Lt. Isaac F. Dortch was subsequently convicted on three charges in a general court martial and penalized twenty numbers on his service record.

== World War I ==
When the United States entered World War I on 6 April 1917, Warrington began patrols off Newport to protect the harbor from German submarines. After six weeks of such duty and preparations for service overseas, she stood out of Boston on 21 May, bound for Europe. After a stop at Newfoundland en route, she arrived at Queenstown, on the southern coast of Ireland, on 1 June. There, she began six months of service patrolling the southern approaches to British ports on the Irish Sea and escorting convoys on the final leg of their voyage across the Atlantic to the British Isles. The destroyer operated out of Queenstown until late November 1917 when she was ordered to France.

She reached Brest, her new base of operations, on 29 November and resumed a grueling schedule of patrols and escort missions. Records indicate that she experienced only one apparent brush with a U-boat. On the morning of 31 May 1918, while escorting a convoy along the French coast, she received a distress call from the Navy transport President Lincoln which, earlier that morning, had been torpedoed by U-90 well out to sea. The destroyer parted company with her coastal convoy immediately and raced to rescue the sinking ship's crew. She did not reach the area of the sinking until late that night but succeeded in rescuing 443 survivors just after 2300. Smith took on all but one of the remaining 688 survivors of President Lincoln. That single exception, Lieutenant Edouard Isaacs, had the dubious honor of being rescued by U-90. On 1 June, during the voyage back to Brest, Warrington and Smith depth-charged the U-90. Lt. Isaacs, the captured naval officer who later escaped from a German prison camp, reported that the charges shook the submarine severely. However, no evidence of any success appeared on the surface; and the two destroyers, conscious of the importance of landing their human cargo, abandoned the attack and continued on to Brest. They entered that port the following day, disembarked the President Lincoln survivors, and resumed their patrol and escort missions.

Through the end of the war, Warrington operated out of Brest, patrolling against enemy submarines. However, the threat posed by the U-boats diminished considerably after the failure of Germany's last offensive in July and an Allied offensive had made their bases on the Belgian coast untenable. Late in October, Germany discontinued unrestricted submarine warfare and, early in November, sued for peace.

== Inter-war period ==
The armistice was concluded on 11 November 1918, but Warrington continued to serve in European waters until the spring of 1919. On 22 March, she stood out of Brest in the screen of a convoy of subchasers and tugs. After visiting the Azores and delivering her charges safely at Bermuda, the warship headed for Philadelphia. She reached the Delaware Capes early in May and remained in the Navy Yard at League Island until decommissioned on 31 January 1920.

Warrington lay at Philadelphia in reserve until 1935. On 20 March 1935, her name was struck from the Naval Vessel Register. She was sold to M. Black & Company, Norfolk, Virginia, on 28 June 1935 for scrapping in accordance with the terms of the London Treaty for the Limitation and Reduction of Naval Armaments.
