= John D. H. Kane Jr. =

U.S. naval officer

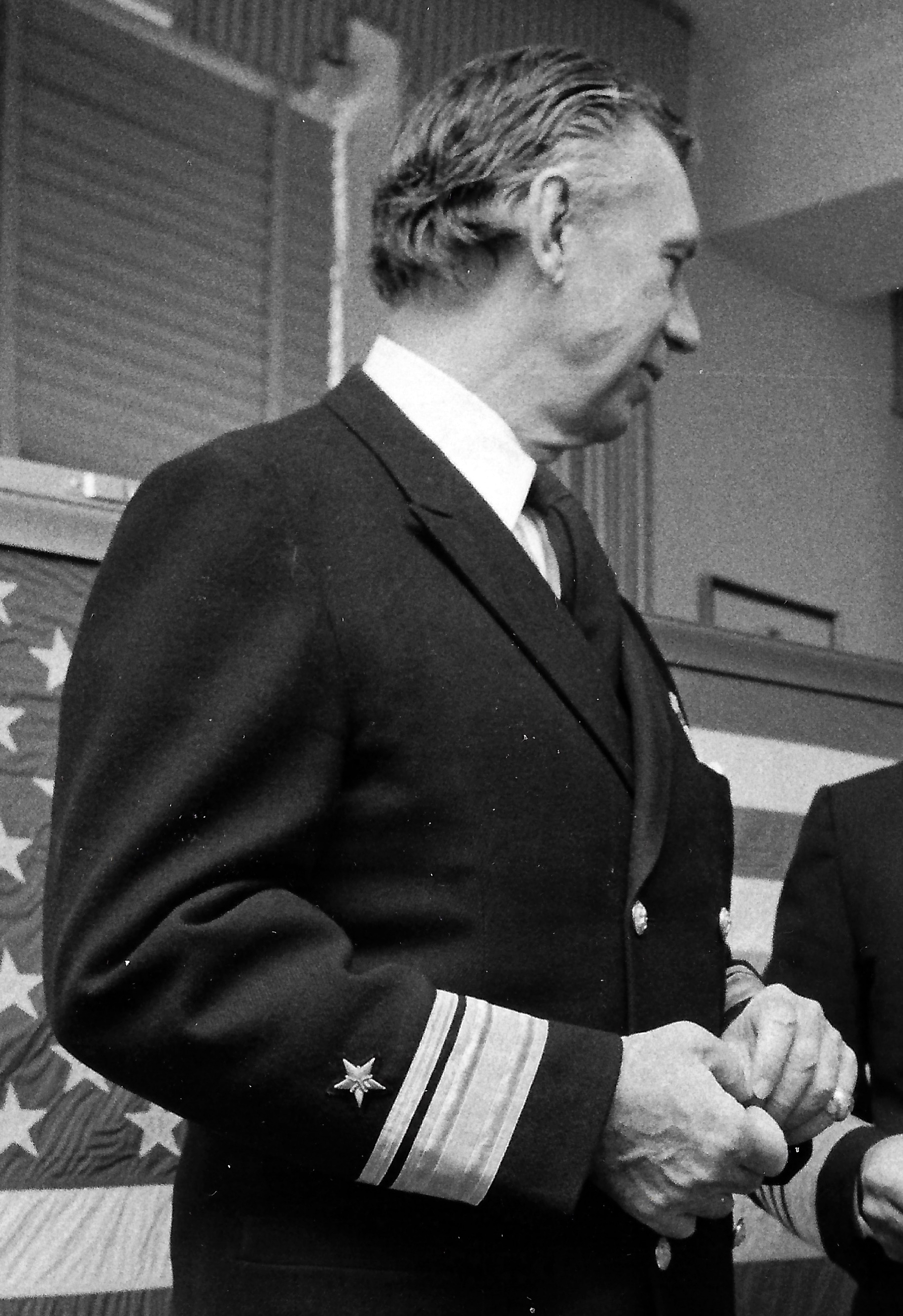
- Born: John Dandridge Henley Kane Jr. 1920 or 1921; Newport, Rhode Island
- Died: August 6, 2013 (aged 92); Bethesda, Maryland
- Education: St. George's School; United States Naval Academy
- Occupation: Naval officer
- Spouse: Suzanne Pattinson (m. 1942)

John Dandridge Henley Kane Jr. (1920 or 1921 – August 6, 2013) was a rear admiral in the United States Navy. He served as the Director of Naval History for nine years from August 1976 until December 1985, where he "established, strengthened, and inspired many aspects of the Navy's history program."

== Family and education ==
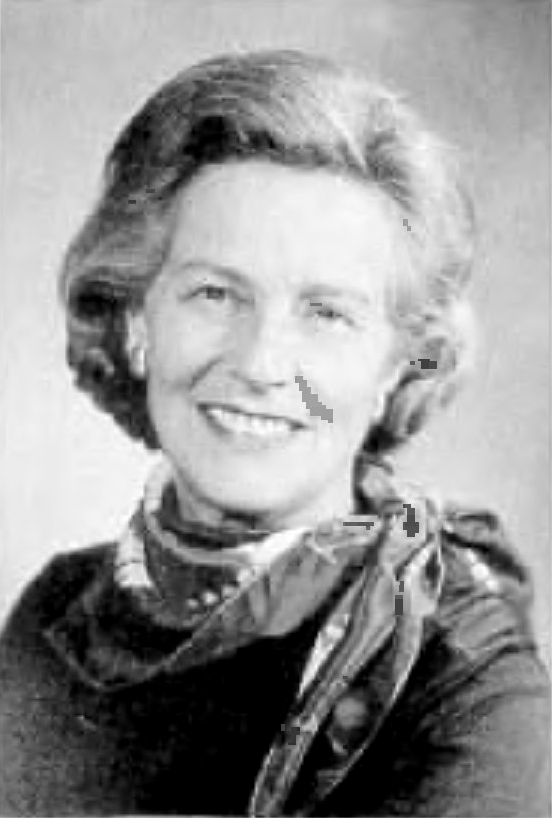
Mrs. John D. H. Kane in 1981

Kane was born in Newport, Rhode Island in 1920 or 1921, the scion of generations of American naval officers. He was the son and namesake of Captain John D. H. Kane and Cordelia Pringle Kane. His maternal grandfather was Vice Admiral Joel R. P. Pringle, and his great-great-great-great grandfather was Captain John D. Henley, a nephew of Martha Washington, who became a midshipman in 1799 and fought in the War of 1812 in the Battle of New Orleans. As a mid-career naval officer, he attended the Naval War College's intermediate course, and the senior course at the National War College.

The young Kane attended St. George's School. While a student there, he was given the honor of unveiling the portrait of his grandfather in the newly completed Pringle Hall at the nearby Naval War College. On his graduation, he attended the United States Naval Academy from 1938. As a midshipman, he won class numerals in tennis and basketball, graduating on an accelerated wartime schedule in December 1941. As a lieutenant (junior grade), he married Miss Suzanne Pattinson, daughter of Mr and Mrs. I. Graham Pattinson of Santa Anita Oaks, Arcadia, California.

== Naval career ==
Following graduation for the Naval Academy, Kane served in the destroyers USS Fitch and USS Haraden, before becoming Executive Officer of the destroyer USS Charles J. Badger during the Battle of Okinawa in 1945, receiving the Bronze Star with Combat V for his gallantry following a during a Japanese suicide boat attack.

He commanded USS Cavallaro and USS Alexander J. Luke before becoming Flag Lieutenant to Commander, Service Force, U.S. Atlantic Fleet. In November 1948, he became assistant intelligence officer on the staff of Commander, U.S. Naval Forces, Germany. In 1953, he took command of USS Theodore Chandler and then served on the staff of Commander in Chief, Joint Forces, Atlantic and Mediterranean, and then on the Joint Staff, Joint Chiefs of Staff in Washington D.C. In July 1961, he served as Commander, Destroyer Division 282, before taking command of the U.S. Sixth Fleet flagship USS Springfield in August 1965. In January 1967, he became Director of the Officer Distribution Division, in the Bureau of Naval Personnel. Thereafter, he served as Deputy Chief of Legislative Affairs in the Navy Department from June 1969 to July 1970, when he became Deputy United States Representative to the NATO Military Committee in Brussels, Belgium. He then became Commandant, Ninth Naval District and Commanding Officer of Great Lakes Naval Base. He retired from active service in 1974.

== Director, Naval History ==
Recalled to service as a retired read admiral, Kane became Director of Naval History and Director of the Naval Historical Center from 1976 to December 1985. His first challenge in this position was to move the center from the Main Navy Building to its new quarters in the Washington Navy Yard. he focused much of his attention to improving the National Museum of the U.S. Navy, while providing support for the continuation of the office's documentary history projects: Naval Documents of the American Revolution and The Naval War of 1812. He made good use of the royalties from Samuel Eliot Morison's History of United States Naval Operations in World War II to fund graduate fellowships for promising naval officers interested in pursuing advanced degrees in U.S. Naval History.

Kane died in Bethesda, Maryland on August 6, 2013.
