= Joel R. P. Pringle =

U.S. Navy officer

Joel Roberts Poinsett Pringle
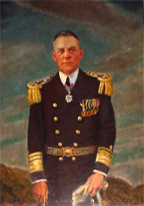
- Born: February 4, 1873; Georgetown, South Carolina, U.S.
- Died: September 25, 1932 (aged 59); San Diego County, California, U.S.
- Relatives: Joel Roberts Poinsett
- Military career
- Allegiance: United States
- Branch: United States Navy
- Service years: 1894–1932
- Rank: Vice Admiral
- Commands: Perkins; Dixie; Flotilla 2, Destroyer Force, Atlantic Fleet; Melville; Idaho; Battleship Division 3, Battle Force; President of the Naval War College
- Conflicts: World War I
- Awards: Distinguished Service Medal

Vice Admiral Joel Roberts Poinsett Pringle (February 4, 1873 – September 25, 1932) was a senior officer of the United States Navy, serving from 1894 to 1932.

== Career ==
Pringle, born in Georgetown, South Carolina, the son of Dominick Lynch Pringle and Caroline Lowndes Pringle. He was appointed to the United States Naval Academy in 1888, where he graduated in 1892. He was commissioned an ensign in 1894.

For his service during World War I, he was awarded the Distinguished Service Medal for exceptionally meritorious service in a duty of great responsibility as commanding officer, Melville and Chief of Staff, Destroyer Flotillas, European Waters.

Pringle graduated from the Naval War College in 1920 and served as a staff member from 1923 to 1925. Subsequently, he served as the college's president from 1927 to 1930.

Attaining the rank of Vice Admiral in 1932, his commands included the destroyer Perkins; Dixie; Flotilla 2, Destroyer Force, Atlantic Fleet; Melville; the battleship Idaho; President of the Naval War College; Battleship Division 3, Battle Force; and Battleships, Battle Force.

== Personal life ==
On January 25, 1899, he married Cordelia Phythian, daughter of Commodore Robert L. Phythian, USN. The couple had one child, a daughter, also named Cordelia. The daughter married an American naval officer, Captain John D. H. Kane. Their son, Admiral Pringle's grandson, was Rear Admiral John D. H. Kane Jr.

He died at San Diego, California, 25 September 1932.

== Awards ==
- Distinguished Service Medal
- Spanish Campaign Medal
- Victory Medal
- Companion of the Order of St. Michael and St. George (United Kingdom)
- Officer of the Legion of Honor (France)

== Legacy ==
- The Fletcher-class destroyer USS Pringle (DD-477) was named for him. The ship was launched by his widow on May 2, 1942 and commissioned on September 15, 1942.
- Pringle Hall at the Naval War College is named in his honor.

Military offices
Preceded by William V. Pratt	President of the Naval War College; 1927–1930	Succeeded by Harris Laning
