= SS Registan =

SS Registan is the name of the following ships:

- SS Registan (1906), sank in 1939
- SS Registan (1910), scrapped in 1960
- SS Registan (1930), became HMS Registan in 1940, sunk 29 September 1942 by U-332

== See also ==
- Registan
