= USS Pringle =

Fletcher-class destroyer

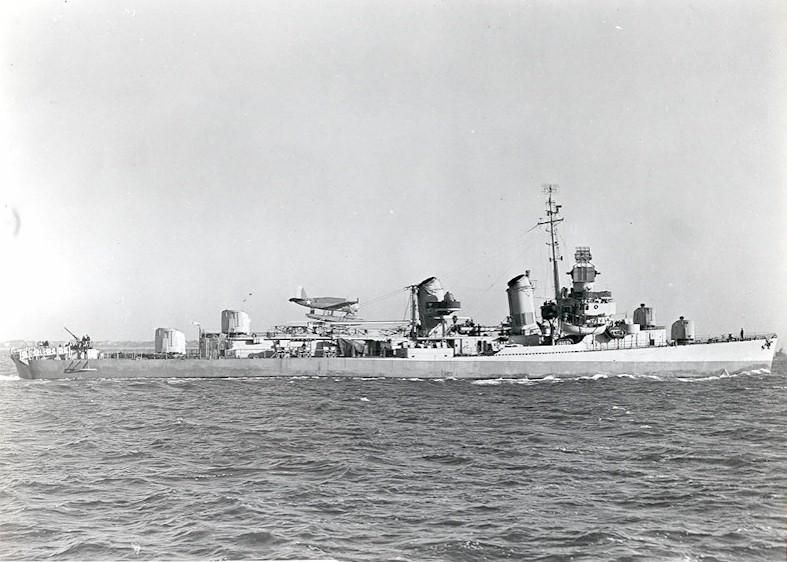
- USS Pringle (DD-477) December 1942, with unique catapult and aircraft, and 5 inch (127 mm) guns trained to port.

History

United States
- Namesake: Joel R. P. Pringle
- Builder: Charleston Navy Yard
- Laid down: 31 July 1941
- Launched: 2 May 1942
- Commissioned: 15 September 1942
- Fate: Sunk by Kamikaze off Okinawa, 16 April 1945

General characteristics
- Class & type: Fletcher-class destroyer
- Displacement: 2,050 tons
- Length: 376 ft 6 in (114.7 m)
- Beam: 39 ft 8 in (12.1 m)
- Draft: 17 ft 9 in (5.4 m)
- Propulsion: 60,000 shp (45 MW); 2 propellers
- Speed: 35 knots (65 km/h; 40 mph)
- Range: 6500 nm at 15 kn (12,000 km at 28 km/h)
- Complement: 336
- Armament: 1942: 4 × 5 in (127 mm)/38 cal. guns (4 × 1); 2 × Bofors 40 mm AA guns (1 × 2); 8 × Oerlikon 20 mm AA guns (8 × 1); 5 × 21 in (533 mm) torpedo tubes (1 × 5); 6 × depth charge projectors; 2 × depth charge tracks; 1944: 5 × 5 in (127 mm)/38 cal. guns (5 × 1); 6 × Bofors 40 mm AA guns (3 × 2); 11 × Oerlikon 20 mm AA guns (11 × 1); 10 × 21 in (533 mm) torpedo tubes (2 × 5); 6 × depth charge projectors; 2 × depth charge tracks
- Aircraft carried: 1, one catapult (removed 1943)

USS Pringle (DD-477), a Fletcher-class destroyer, was a ship of the United States Navy named for Vice Admiral Joel R. P. Pringle (1873–1932).

Pringle was laid down by the Charleston Navy Yard, on 31 July 1941; launched on 2 May 1942, sponsored by Mrs. John D. H. Kane; and commissioned on 15 September 1942.

== Service history ==
Pringle was one of the three Fletcher-class destroyers to be built (out of 6 planned) with a catapult for a float plane. The catapult and an aircraft crane were located just aft of the number 2 smokestack, in place of the after torpedo tube mount, 5-inch mount number 3, and the 2nd deck of the after deck house which normally carried a twin 40 mm anti-aircraft gun on most ships of the class. (The twin 40 mm mount was moved to the fantail, just forward of the depth charge racks, where most ships of the class carried 20 mm mounts.) It was intended that the float plane be used for scouting for the destroyer flotilla to which the ship was attached. It would be launched by the catapult, land on the water next to the ship, and be recovered by the aircraft crane. Pringle was the first of five ships that eventually received the catapult to use it operationally. Due to design problems with the derrick, Pringle could not recover the Kingfisher airplane. Two ships constructed in 1943, USS Stevens and USS Halford, had redesigned derricks. Stevens became the first of the five ships to successfully launch and recover the plane. All were ultimately converted to the standard Fletcher-class configuration.

Following shakedown, Pringle joined convoy ON 154 in mid-Atlantic 1 January 1943 to escort the Halifax-bound contingent. While on this duty she was the first U.S. destroyer to use an aircraft with catapult. The float plane was catapulted off to search for enemy submarines. Recovery of the plane in the prevailing weather for a ship the size of Pringle was difficult. After reaching Halifax, Pringle proceeded to Charleston Naval Shipyard for a brief overhaul, during which her catapult was removed, returning her to standard Fletcher configuration.

On 6 February, she got underway for the Pacific Theater, escorting the British aircraft carrier HMS Victorious from Norfolk Navy Yard to the Pacific. Arriving off Guadalcanal on 30 May, she took up patrol duties off the Solomons, and, on the night of 17/18 July, joined Waller and Saufley in attacking three Japanese destroyers off Vanga Point, Kolombangara. Scoring several torpedo hits, she also shot down one Japanese plane.

As the Solomon Islands campaign continued into August, Pringle screened advance units of the Vella Lavella assault force, escorted LSTs through Gizo strait, and on the 24th covered minelaying operations off Kolombangara under Japanese guns. On the night of 3/4 September, Pringle with Dyson made a sweep of Japanese barges between Gambi Head, Choiseul, and Kolombangara, sinking three.

While escorting Task Group 31.7 into Empress Augusta Bay, Bougainville, on 11 November 10 days after the initial landing there, Pringle shot down one Japanese plane and damaged another. With the exception of a run to Sydney in late January 1944, she continued to operate in the Solomons for the next few months. She swept the southwest coast of Bougainville during daylight in early March, bombarding enemy installations and beached barges.

The Marianas operation produced another long period of bombardment, screening and anti-submarine missions for Pringle. During the assaults on Saipan and Tinian, she conducted fire support operations. She then returned to San Francisco, California, for refit and to rest her crew.

After overhaul at Mare Island Naval Shipyard, Pringle sailed for Pearl Harbor on 19 October. She departed Pearl Harbor on 10 November for the Philippines to take part in the upcoming invasion. From 27 to 28 November, she bombarded enemy shore positions near Ormoc Bay, Leyte, shooting down a Japanese plane on the same day. On 27 November, she and Saufley, Waller, and Renshaw combined to sink IJA transport submarine MaruYu-No.2. On 28 November, these destroyers sink I-46.

Pringle came under her most intense air attack while escorting a re-supply echelon to Mindoro from 27 to 30 December. Several ships in the convoy were sunk, while Pringle shot down two planes. On the 30th, a kamikaze crashed into her after deckhouse, killing 11 men and injuring 20, totally destroying one 40 mm mount and damaging two 5-inch mounts.

Back in service in February, Pringle screened transports to Iwo Jima for the assault there on the 17th, then provided fire support for the Marines ashore. Returning to Ulithi on 4 March, she prepared for the assault on Okinawa.

== Fate ==
Operating with Destroyer Division 90, she screened transport areas, covered minesweepers, and provided support fire. Assigned to radar picket duty on 15 April, she shot down two kamikazes on 16 April 1945 before a third crashed into her bridge, and plowed through the superstructure deck, abaft the base of number one stack. A single 1,000-pound bomb, or two 500-pounders, penetrated the main and superstructure decks and exploded with a violent eruption, buckling the keel and splitting the vessel in two at the forward fire room. Six minutes later, 258 survivors watched Pringle slide beneath the surface. 69 were killed.

== Honors ==
Pringle earned 10 battle stars for World War II service.
