= USS Dortch =

Fletcher-class destroyer

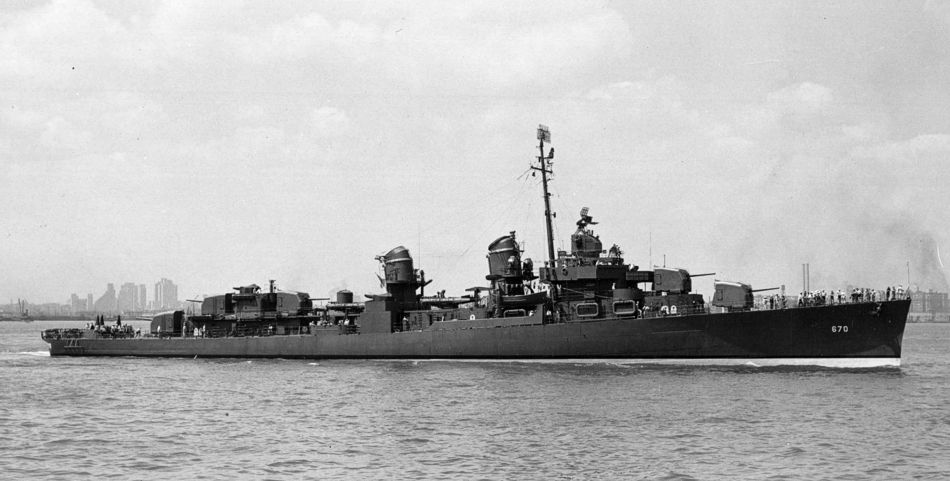
- The USS Dortch (DD-670)

History

United States
- Namesake: Isaac Foote Dortch
- Builder: Federal Shipbuilding and Drydock Company, Kearny, New Jersey
- Laid down: 2 March 1943
- Launched: 20 June 1943
- Commissioned: 7 August 1943
- Decommissioned: 13 December 1957
- Stricken: 1 September 1975
- Fate: Transferred to Argentina as Espora 1 August 1961

History

Argentina
- Name: Espora
- Acquired: 16 August 1961
- Stricken: 1977
- Fate: Scrapped, 1977

General characteristics
- Class & type: Fletcher-class destroyer
- Displacement: 2,050 tons
- Length: 376 ft 6 in (114.7 m)
- Beam: 39 ft in (12.1 m)
- Draft: 17 ft 9 in (5.4 m)
- Propulsion: 60,000 shp (45 MW); geared turbines; 2 propellers
- Speed: 38 knots (70 km/h; 44 mph)
- Range: 6,500 nautical miles at 15 kt; (12,000 km at 30 km/h)
- Complement: 329
- Armament: 5 × 5 in (130 mm)/38 guns, 10 × 40 mm AA guns, 7 × 20 mm AA guns, 10 × 21 inch (533 mm) torpedo tubes, 6 × depth charge projectors, 2 × depth charge tracks

USS Dortch (DD-670) was a Fletcher-class destroyer of the United States Navy.

== Namesake ==
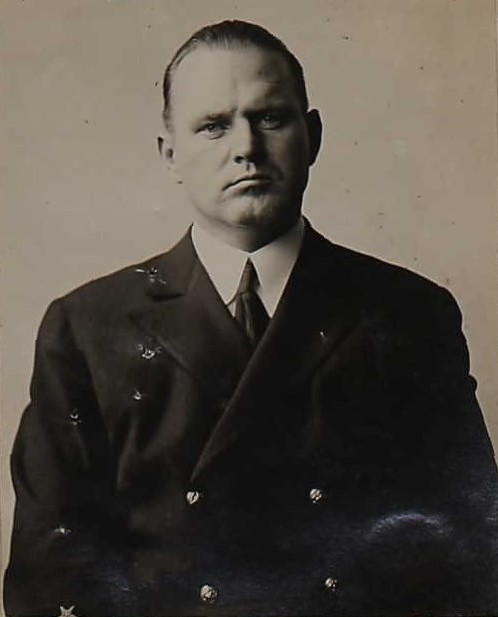
Isaac F. Dortch

Isaac Foote Dortch was born on 12 December 1883 in Gadsden, Alabama. He graduated from the United States Naval Academy in 1905. He commanded the USS Warrington from November 1915 to November 1917, and then during World War I, commanded USS Wadsworth and fitted out and commissioned USS Talbot. For his distinguished service while commanding Wadsworth and Talbot, he was awarded the Navy Cross. Captain Dortch served as naval attaché in Argentina and Chile during 1922–1925. He died while on active duty on 4 June 1932, at San Francisco, California.

== Construction and commissioning ==
Dortch (DD-670) was laid down on 2 March 1943 and launched 20 June 1943 by Federal Shipbuilding and Drydock Company, Kearny, New Jersey; sponsored by Miss M.C. Dortch, daughter of Captain Dortch; and commissioned 7 August 1943.

== History ==
During October and November 1943 Dortch sailed to Trinidad, British West Indies, where she served as plane guard and screen for USS Langley (CVL-27) during the carrier's shakedown cruise. Dortch sailed from Norfolk on 3 December in the screen of newly commissioned USS Intrepid (CV-11) and arrived at Pearl Harbor on 28 December.

Dortch served in the screen of the Fast Carrier Task Force TF 58 during the capture and occupation of the Marshall Islands from 29 January 1944. She took part in the initial raids on Truk of 16 February and 17 and on the Marianas on 23 February, then sailed with the task group providing air cover for landings on Emirau Island in March. Later that month she rejoined TF 58 for raids on Palau, Yap, Ulithi and Woleai from 30 March to 1 April; support of the Hollandia operation in New Guinea on 21 April and 22; and a repeat raid on Truk from 29 April to 1 May.

After screening escort carriers to Pearl Harbor, Dortch returned to TF 58 for the capture and occupation of Saipan, screening the carriers as they fought and won the decisive Battle of the Philippine Sea. During the invasion of Guam Dortch patrolled west of the island as life guard and fighter director ship, as well as screening the carriers that provided air support for the troops ashore.

Dortch saw action in the 5th Fleet raids on the Bonins on 4 and 5 August 1944, then returned to cover the landings on Peleliu, Palau Islands, on 15 September. She remained with the fast carriers while they pounded airfields and installations in the Nansei Shoto, Formosa, Luzon, and on the Chinese coast to neutralize Japanese bases in preparation for the invasion of the Philippines. She continued to protect the carriers as they launched strikes against the Japanese fleet in the Battle for Leyte Gulf 24–25 October.

On 10 February 1945 Dortch sortied in a scouting line ahead of TF 58 for the strike on the Tokyo Bay area of 16 February and 17. On the following day Dortch, with USS Clarence K. Bronson (DD-668), attacked and seriously damaged an enemy picket vessel; Dortch received 14 casualties in the action. On the 19th she was off Iwo Jima for the assault landings, and continued to patrol off the island in the day and screen transports at night. She rejoined the carriers for raids on Tokyo on 25 February and strikes and photo reconnaissance missions over Okinawa 1 March. Returning to duty at Iwo Jima, Dortch sailed 29 March for an overhaul on the west coast, arriving in San Francisco 21 April. Dortch got underway on 9 July 1945, and bombarded Wake Island on 8 August while making her passage to Guam. On 27 August she entered Tokyo Bay, and served in the occupation of Japan and its possessions until sailing for the States 5 December 1945. She was placed out of commission in reserve at Charleston, S.C. on 19 July 1946.

Recommissioned 4 May 1951 Dortch was assigned to the Atlantic Fleet, and from Newport, Rhode Island, operated on the east coast and in the Caribbean. In August 1952 she sailed to take part in NATO Operation Mainbrace off Norway and Denmark, returning to Newport 9 October. On 27 April 1953 she sailed for the Pacific, and operated with TF 77 off Korea until October. She continued west to complete a round-the-world cruise, returning to Newport in December. In 1954-55 and 1957 she served with the 6th Fleet in the Mediterranean, patrolling off the Gaza Strip, where conditions remained tense after the Suez Crisis, during the latter cruise. Dortch continued her east coast and Caribbean operations until again placed out of commission in reserve on 13 December 1957.

Dortch received eight battle stars for World War II service and one for Korean War service.

== Argentine service ==
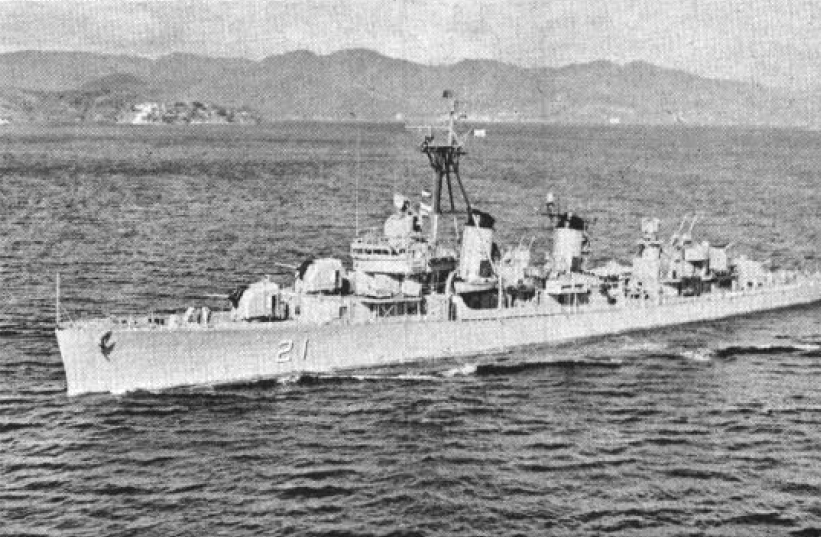
Dortch as ARA Espora (D-21) in 1962.

Dortch was placed out of commission in reserve on 13 December 1957, transferred to Argentina as Espora (D-21) on 16 August 1961, and finally struck from the Navy list on 1 September 1975. ARA Espora was stricken from the Argentine Navy list and broken up for scrap in 1977.
