= USS McCall (DD-400) =

Gridley-class destroyer

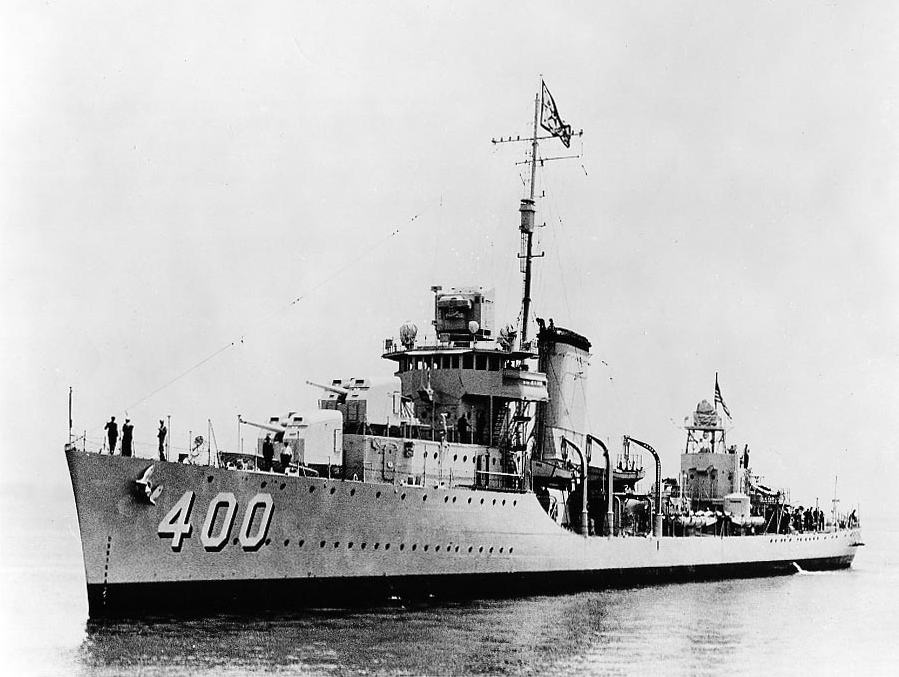
- USS McCall (DD-400) underway, circa 1938

History

United States
- Name: McCall
- Namesake: Edward R. McCall
- Builder: Bethlehem Shipbuilding Corporation - Union Iron Works, San Francisco, California
- Laid down: 17 March 1936
- Launched: 20 November 1937
- Commissioned: 22 June 1938
- Decommissioned: 30 November 1945
- Stricken: 28 January 1947
- Identification: DD-400
- Fate: Scrapped

General characteristics
- Class & type: Gridley-class destroyer
- Displacement: 1,500 tons
- Length: 341 ft 4 in (104.04 m)
- Beam: 35 ft 5 in (10.80 m)
- Draft: 14 ft 4 in (4.37 m)
- Propulsion: 50,000 shp (37,000 kW) Bethlehem geared turbines, 2 screws
- Speed: 36.5 knots (67.6 km/h; 42.0 mph)
- Complement: 184
- Armament: 4 x 5 in (127 mm)/38 cal. guns; 16 x 21 inch (533 mm) torpedo tubes

The second USS McCall (DD-400) was a Gridley-class destroyer in the United States Navy named after Captain Edward McCall, an officer in the United States Navy during the War of 1812. Launched in 1937, she saw service throughout World War II, including in the Guadalcanal Campaign, Battle of the Philippine Sea, and other battles, earning 9 battle stars for her service. She was struck from the rolls in 1947 and scrapped the following year.

== History ==
=== Construction ===
McCall (DD-400) was laid down on 17 March 1936 at the Union Plant, Bethlehem Shipbuilding Corporation, San Francisco, California and launched on 20 November 1937; sponsored by Miss Eleanor Kempff. The ship was commissioned on 22 June 1938, Lieutenant Commander John Whelchel in command.

=== 1941-1943 ===
Assigned to the Pacific, McCall reported for duty in Destroyers, Battle Force, 16 January 1939. Less than two years later, on 7 December 1941, she was steaming with the aircraft carrier Enterprise en route to Pearl Harbor from Wake Island when she received word of the Japanese attack on the former. McCall's task force (TF 8) immediately commenced a search for the Japanese Fleet. By the time the force returned to Pearl Harbor only one Japanese vessel had been sighted, the submarine Japanese submarine I-70 which was sunk by the force's aircraft on 10 December. For the remainder of 1941 McCall, in the screen of Enterprise, stayed in the Hawaiian Islands area to guard against follow-up attack.

As the Japanese advanced south and east through the islands of the southwest Pacific, McCall headed in that direction with Enterprise and Yorktown for raids on Japanese installations in the southern Marshall Islands and northern Gilbert Islands. Making the strikes on 1 February 1942, the carrier forces and bombardment groups completed their missions in spite of heavy aerial resistance and were back at Oahu on 5 February. On 15 February, the force (now designated TF 16) got underway for Wake and Marcus Islands against which they launched surprise attacks, 24 February and 4 March, respectively, and then returned to Pearl Harbor, 10 March.

McCall spent the next 6 weeks on patrol in Hawaiian waters and then did escort duty from Hawaii to Samoa, Fiji, and Tonga islands. At the end of May she sailed north to the Aleutian Islands as the Japanese stretched toward Alaska. Throughout the summer months she patrolled out of Kodiak, Alaska and participated in the bombardment of Japanese targets in the western Aleutians. She returned to Pearl Harbor 30 September, underwent overhaul and got underway with TF 11 for the South Pacific, 12 November 1942, to join in the Battle of Guadalcanal. In the Solomon Islands area for the next 10 months, the destroyer operated from Nouméa as she cruised on antisubmarine patrols and escorted carriers and convoys. On 19 September 1943 she departed to escort a convoy to San Francisco, California. There she underwent overhaul and then exercises along the west coast before sailing west again.

=== 1944 ===
Early in 1944 she joined TF 58, the fast carrier force, and put to sea 19 January, to screen the carriers as their planes raided Wotje, Taroa, and Eniwetok during February. McCall next screened the carriers as strikes were conducted against Palau. In March the force commenced operations from newly won Majuro and from there McCall sailed to guard the carriers as they made heavy strikes on the Palaus, Yap, Ulithi, and Woleai, 30 March to 1 April; covered the landings at Hollandia, 22 April; and raided Truk, Satawan, and Ponape, 29 April to 1 May.

After brief repairs at Pearl Harbor, McCall rejoined TF 58 at Majuro 4 June. Two days later the force sortied for operations in the Marianas Islands. First, they directly supported the landings on Guam, Rota, and Saipan, and then raided Iwo and Chichi Jima to prevent enemy reinforcements from reaching the Marianas through those islands. Then on 18 June they received word of a Japanese force sighted between the Philippines and the Marianas.

On 19 June, the Battle of the Philippine Sea began as Japanese carrier based planes attacked the 5th Fleet. By the end of the two‑day battle, the Japanese had lost three carriers, 92 percent of its carrier planes and 72 percent of its floatplanes, a disastrous toll in a war based largely on naval airpower. After pursuing the Japanese, the carriers, with McCall in the screen, turned their attention to the Bonins and then retired to Eniwetok, arriving 27 June.

By 4 July, the fast carriers were again raiding Iwo Jima. They then steamed back to the Marianas where McCall, with Gridley, took up patrol off Guam, 10 July. At 1820 that day, McCall's crew observed a heliograph from a cliff south of Uruno Point. Identifying the operator as friendly, a motor whaleboat, manned by a volunteer landing party, was dispatched to effect the rescue of the message sender. In spite of being within range of 6 in (152 mm) coastal batteries, the rescue was accomplished and George R. Tweed, RM1c, USN, having been on Guam since 1939 and in hiding since the Japanese occupation, was brought on board. With him he brought information on Japanese strength, morale, prelanding casualties, and disposition of troops and guns.

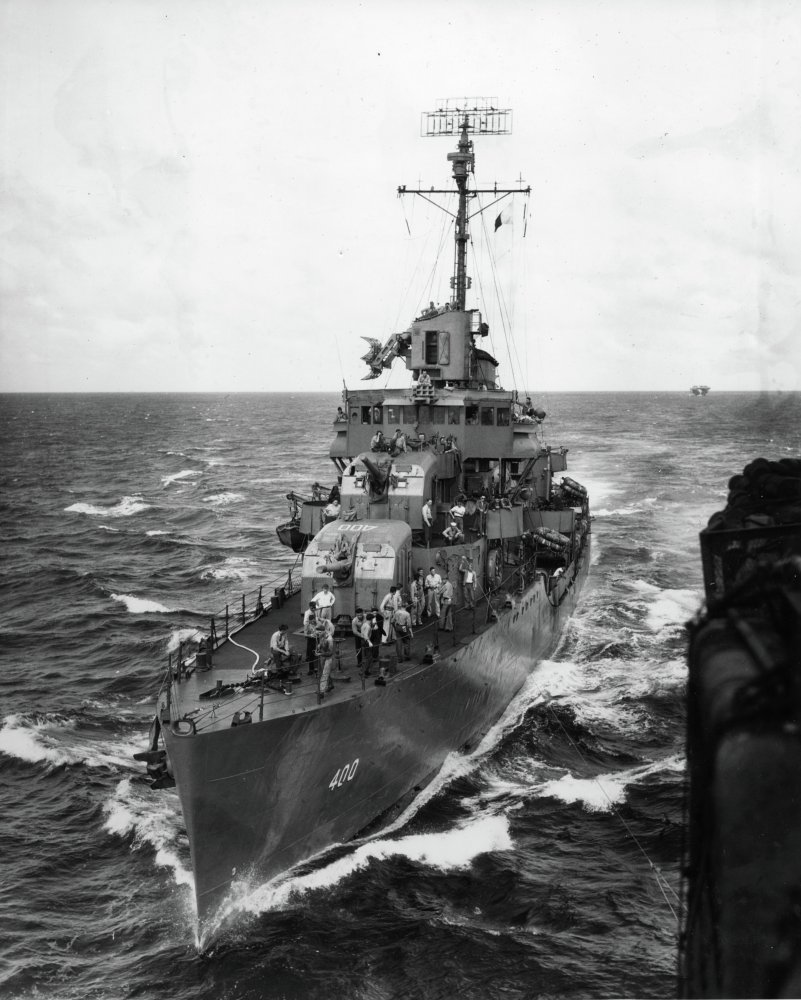
USS McCall underway on 15 January 1945.

During the next nine weeks, McCall guarded the carriers as they struck again at Iwo Jima and then moved on to support offensive operations against the Palaus, Yap, and Ulithi. By 10 October they were off Okinawa, moving from there to Formosa and Luzon. On the 23d, covering the forces in Leyte Gulf, they turned north again to engage a Japanese carrier force, now bereft of planes because of losses sustained in the Battle of the Philippine Sea and off Formosa. On the 25th, the enemy force was engaged off Cape Engaño. Losses to the Japanese by the 27th included three cruisers in addition to several destroyers.

McCall spent most of November off Leyte in support of land operations there. Then after availability at Manus she sortied 27 December for Lingayen Gulf to support the Luzon invasion. In mid-January 1945, she was attached to TG 78.12 for transport convoy escort duty and on the 28th resumed fire support duties.

=== 1945 ===
On 19 February, McCall arrived in the transport area off Iwo Jima. Remaining there well into March, she screened the transports and provided shore bombardment, harassing and illumination fire services. On 27 March, she departed the Volcano Islands area for Pearl Harbor and the west coast, arriving at San Diego, California 22 April. Within the week she got underway for a scheduled overhaul at New York. Her yard work completed by 4 August, she was undergoing refresher training at Casco Bay when Japan surrendered 14 August.

=== Fate ===
Two months later she entered the Norfolk Navy Yard where she decommissioned 30 November 1945. Struck from the Naval Vessel Register 28 January 1947 and sold to the Hugo Neu Corporation, New York, 17 November 1947, McCall was scrapped 20 March 1948.

== Honors ==
McCall received nine battle stars for World War II service.
