= USS Beale (DD-40) =

Paulding-class destroyer

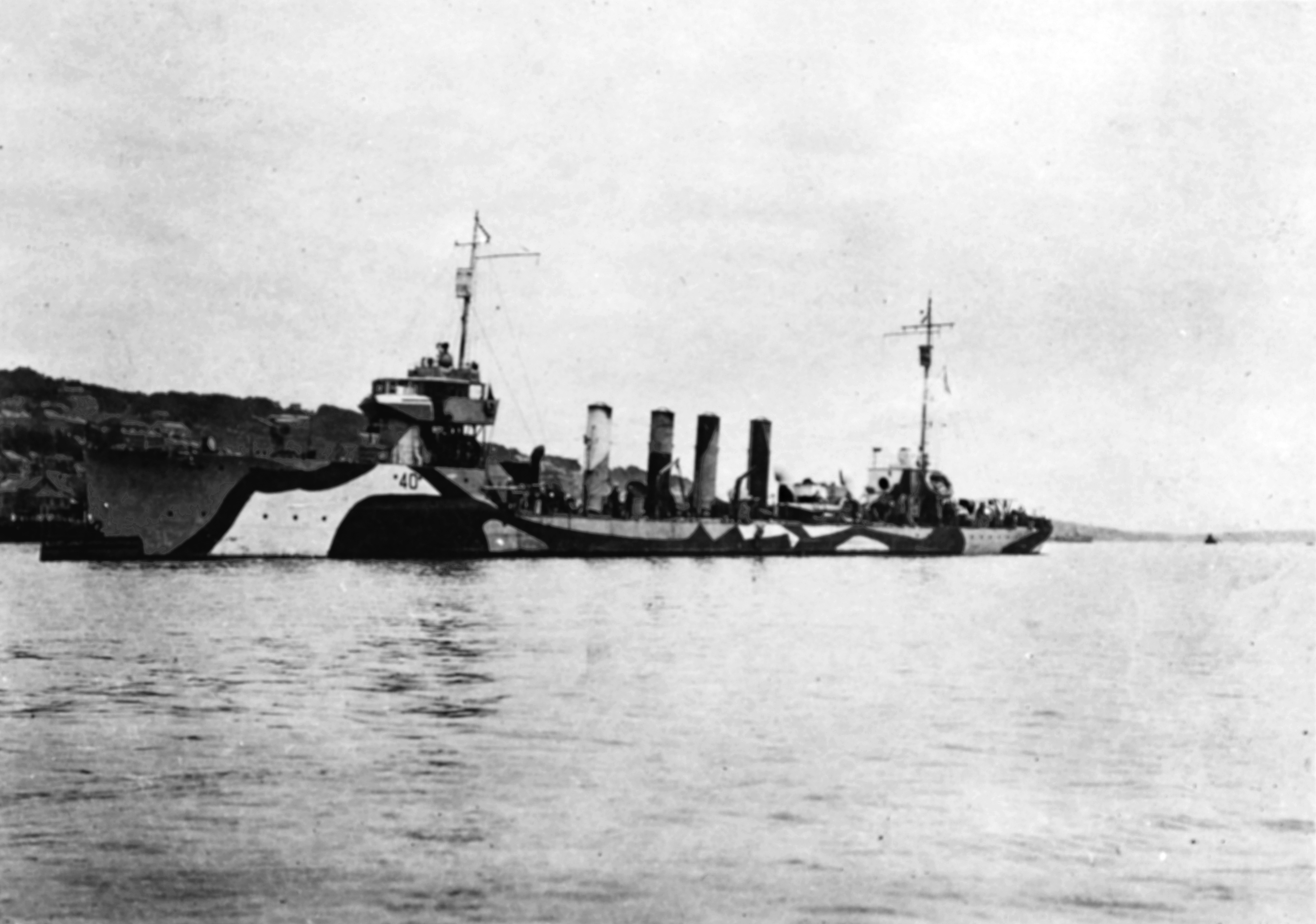
- USS Beale (DD-40) moored to a buoy at Queenstown, Ireland, in 1918. She is painted in pattern camouflage.

History

United States
- Name: Beale
- Namesake: Lieutenant (navy) Edward Fitzgerald Beale
- Builder: William Cramp & Sons, Philadelphia
- Cost: $669,168.12 (hull and machinery)
- Yard number: 379
- Laid down: 8 May 1911
- Launched: 30 April 1912
- Sponsored by: Mrs. Emily Beale McLean, the daughter of Lt. Beale
- Commissioned: 30 September 1912
- Decommissioned: 25 October 1919
- Stricken: 28 June 1934
- Identification: Hull symbol:DD-40; Code letters:NCL
- Fate: Transferred to the United States Coast Guard; Sold for scrap 22 August 1934
- Notes: Patterson lost her name to new construction on 5 July 1934

United States
- Name: Beale
- Acquired: 28 April 1924
- Commissioned: 26 October 1924
- Decommissioned: 1 June 1930
- Identification: Hull symbol:CG-9
- Fate: Returned to the Navy

General characteristics
- Class & type: Paulding-class destroyer
- Displacement: 742 long tons (754 t) normal; 887 long tons (901 t) full load
- Length: 293 ft 10 in (89.56 m)
- Beam: 27 ft (8.2 m)
- Draft: 8 ft 4 in (2.54 m) (mean)
- Installed power: 12,000 ihp (8,900 kW)
- Propulsion: 4 × boilers; 3 × Parsons Direct Drive Turbines; 3 × shafts
- Speed: 29.5 kn (33.9 mph; 54.6 km/h); 29.65 kn (34.12 mph; 54.91 km/h) (Speed on Trial)
- Complement: 4 officers 87 enlisted
- Armament: 5 × 3 in (76 mm)/50 caliber guns; 6 × 18-inch (450 mm) torpedo tubes (3 × 2)

USS Beale (DD-40), a Paulding-class destroyer served in the United States Navy during World War I and later with the United States Coast Guard. She was the first ship of the Navy to be named for Edward Fitzgerald Beale.

Beale was launched on 30 April 1912 and was commissioned on 30 August 1912. She served in the Gulf of Mexico and Caribbean Sea until 1915 and with the Atlantic Fleet from 1916 until being decommissioned in 1919. She was transferred to the United States Coast Guard in 1924. From 1924 to 1930 she operated to prevent rum-runners from illegally bringing alcoholic beverages into the United States. Beale was scrapped in 1934.

== World War I ==
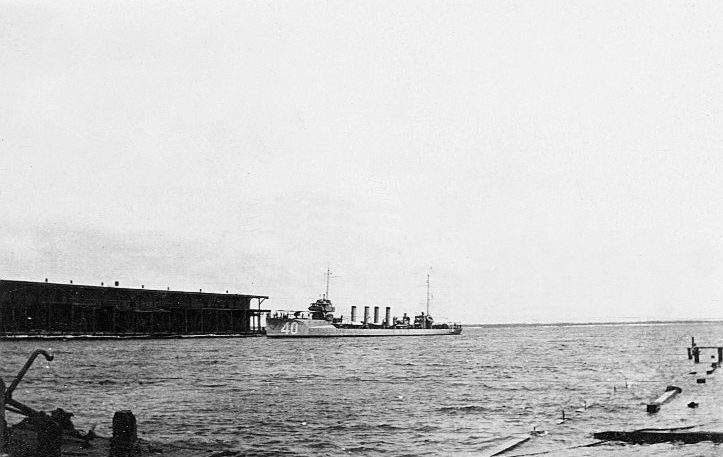
Beale at Key West, Florida.

Beale was launched on 30 April 1912 by William Cramp and Sons Ship and Engine Building Company of Philadelphia. She was sponsored by Mrs. John R. McLean, daughter of Lieutenant Beale. She was commissioned on 30 August 1912.

Beale joined the 5th Group, Torpedo Flotilla of the Atlantic Fleet, and cruised along the Atlantic coast and in Mexican and Caribbean waters until placed in reserve on 13 December 1915. She was reactivated with a reduced crew on 5 January 1916 and served on Neutrality Patrol along the Atlantic coast until placed in full commission on 22 March 1917. She joined the Atlantic Destroyer Force and arrived at Queenstown, Ireland on 5 February 1918.

Beale operated out of Queenstown on convoy and patrol duty until the end of World War I. She returned to the United States in December 1918 and served with the Atlantic Fleet until placed out of commission in reserve at Philadelphia Navy Yard on 25 October 1919.

== Inter-war period ==
Beale was reactivated in 1924 and transferred to the Coast Guard on 28 April 1924 for use in enforcing the Volstead Act, which prohibited the sale or import of alcoholic beverages in the United States. In Coast Guard service she was assigned hull number CG-9. She was returned to the Navy on 18 October 1930 and was laid up at Philadelphia Navy Yard until she was scrapped in 1934.

== Notes ==
Citations

References used

- This article incorporates text from the public domain Dictionary of American Naval Fighting Ships. The entry can be found here.
- "Record of Movements, Vessels of the United States Coast Guard, 1790–December 31, 1933" (PDF). U.S. Coast Guard, Department of Transportation.
- Canney, Donald L. (1995). U.S. Coast Guard and Revenue Cutters, 1790–1935. Naval Institute Press, Annapolis, Maryland. ISBN 978-1-55750-101-1.
