= USS Burrows (DD-29) =

Paulding-class destroyer

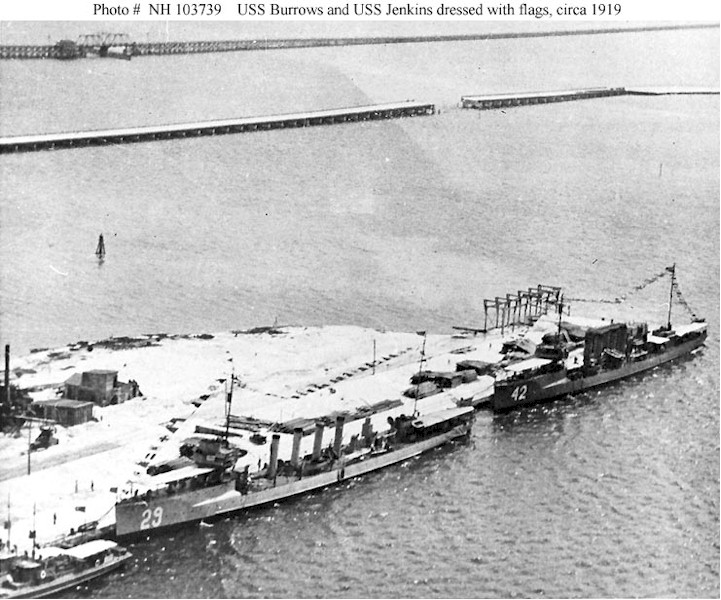
- USS Burrows (DD-29) and USS Jenkins (DD-42) in port, dressed with flags, circa 1919.

History

United States
- Name: Burrows
- Namesake: Lieutenant William Ward Burrows II awarded Congressional Gold Medal
- Builder: New York Shipbuilding Company, Camden, New Jersey
- Cost: $679,302.27
- Laid down: 19 June 1909
- Launched: 23 June 1910
- Sponsored by: Miss Lorna Dorothea Burrows
- Commissioned: 21 February 1911
- Decommissioned: 12 December 1919
- Stricken: 5 July 1934
- Identification: Hull symbol:DD-29; Code letters:NCV
- Fate: Transferred to the United States Coast Guard; Sold on 22 August 1934 and scrapped in 1934

United States
- Name: Burrows
- Acquired: 7 June 1924
- Commissioned: 30 June 1925
- Decommissioned: 14 February 1931
- Identification: Hull symbol:CG-10
- Fate: transferred back to the United States Navy

General characteristics
- Class & type: Paulding-class destroyer
- Displacement: 742 long tons (754 t) normal; 887 long tons (901 t) full load
- Length: 293 ft 10 in (89.56 m)
- Beam: 27 ft (8.2 m)
- Draft: 8 ft 4 in (2.54 m) (mean)
- Installed power: 12,000 ihp (8,900 kW)
- Propulsion: 4 × boilers; 3 × Parsons Direct Drive Turbines; 3 × shafts
- Speed: 29.5 kn (33.9 mph; 54.6 km/h); 30.67 kn (35.29 mph; 56.80 km/h) (Speed on Trial)
- Complement: 4 officers 87 enlisted
- Armament: 5 × 3 in (76 mm)/50 caliber guns; 6 × 18 inch (450 mm) torpedo tubes (3 × 2)

USS Burrows (DD-29) was a modified Paulding-class destroyer in the United States Navy during World War I and later in the United States Coast Guard, designated (CG-10). She was the second ship named for Lieutenant William Ward Burrows II.

Burrows was launched on 23 June 1910 by New York Shipbuilding Company, Camden, New Jersey, sponsored by Miss Lorna Dorthea Burrows, a relative of Lieutenant Burrows, and commissioned on 21 February 1911.

== United States Navy ==
Prior to World War I, Burrows was attached to the Torpedo Flotilla, Atlantic Fleet, and operated along the east coast and in Cuban waters, performing tactical maneuvers, war games, torpedo practice, and gunnery. Early in 1916, Burrows was assigned to the Neutrality Patrol in the Staten Island–Long Island area of New York. When the United States entered World War I, Burrows patrolled the Lower Harbor, New York. On 7 April 1917, she reported to Commander, Squadron 2, Patrol Force, and carried out an unfruitful search for a German raider reported in the vicinity of Nantucket, Massachusetts. On 10 April, she was detached from Squadron 2 and reported to Philadelphia Navy Yard, where she was fitted out for distant service.

In June, she sailed from New York with Group 2, Cruiser and Transport Force, to escort the convoy which carried the first American Expeditionary Force to reach France. She arrived in the Loire River on 27 June 1917, and was assigned to patrol the south coast of Ireland, operating out of Queenstown, Ireland. Burrows patrolled; escorted convoys; answered Allied distress calls; landed survivors; and fought enemy submarines that hunted in the English Channel. On one occasion, she was in trouble with a broken oil line, which caused a fire on board. Four other destroyers assisted her in putting it out, but two crew members lost their lives. With the cessation of hostilities, she performed various duties at Brest, France, and was present at the reception of President Woodrow Wilson on 13 December 1918, when George Washington and escort arrived.

Burrows arrived at Philadelphia on 2 January 1919. She operated along the eastern seaboard for several months, and in June reported to Philadelphia Navy Yard. Burrows was decommissioned on 12 December 1919.

== United States Coast Guard ==
In June 1924, she was transferred to the Treasury Department for use by the Coast Guard. She was based in New London, Connecticut as part of the Rum Patrol.

Burrows was returned to the Navy on 2 May 1931. Burrows was later scrapped in accordance with the London Naval Treaty.
