= USS Springfield =

USS Springfield may refer to the following ships of the United States Navy:

- USS Springfield (1862) was a sternwheel steamboat in use during the American Civil War.
- USS Springfield (ID-2575) was a steamboat chartered during 1918 and 1919.
- USS Springfield (CL-66) was a light cruiser commissioned in 1944, and later converted to a guided-missile cruiser serving until 1974
- USS Springfield (SSN-761) is a Los Angeles-class nuclear attack submarine commissioned in 1993 and currently in active service
