= USS Haraden =

USS Haraden may refer to the following ships of the United States Navy:

- USS Haraden (DD-183), a Wickes-class destroyer, launched in 1918, transferred to the United Kingdom in 1940 and struck from the US Navy list in 1941. The ship was assigned to Canada and renamed HMCS Columbia. She was sold for scrap in 1945.
- USS Haraden (DD-585), a Fletcher-class destroyer, launched in 1943, decommissioned in 1946, and struck in 1972.
