= USS Mayrant (DD-31) =

Paulding-class destroyer

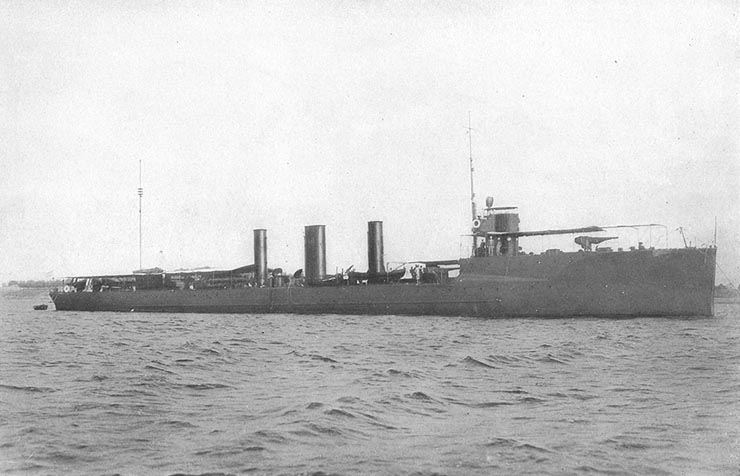
- USS Mayrant (DD-31) at anchor, 1911.

History

United States
- Name: Mayrant
- Namesake: Captain John Mayrant
- Builder: William Cramp & Sons, Philadelphia
- Cost: $673,547.02
- Yard number: 353
- Laid down: 22 April 1909
- Launched: 23 April 1910
- Sponsored by: Mrs. I. B. Beard
- Commissioned: 21 July 1911
- Decommissioned: 20 May 1915
- Identification: Hull symbol:DD-31; Code letters:NJU
- Recommissioned: 2 January 1918
- Decommissioned: 12 December 1919
- Stricken: 8 March 1935
- Fate: Sold June 28, 1935 to M. Black & Co., Norfolk
- Notes: designated DD‑31, 17 July 1920, so her name could be reused

General characteristics
- Class & type: Paulding-class destroyer
- Displacement: 742 long tons (754 t) normal; 887 long tons (901 t) full load
- Length: 293 ft 10 in (89.56 m)
- Beam: 27 ft (8.2 m)
- Draft: 8 ft 4 in (2.54 m) (mean)
- Installed power: 12,000 ihp (8,900 kW)
- Propulsion: 4 × boilers; 2 × Parsons Direct Drive Turbines; 2 × shafts
- Speed: 29.5 kn (33.9 mph; 54.6 km/h); 30.22 kn (34.78 mph; 55.97 km/h) (Speed on Trial)
- Complement: 4 officers 98 enlisted
- Armament: 5 × 3 in (76 mm)/50 caliber guns; 6 × 18 inch (450 mm) torpedo tubes (3 × 2)

The first USS Mayrant (DD-31) was a modified Paulding-class destroyer in the United States Navy during World War I. She was named for Captain John Mayrant.

Mayrant was laid down on 22 April 1909 by William Cramp & Sons, Philadelphia; launched on 23 April 1910; sponsored by Mrs. I. B. Beard, great-great-granddaughter of Captain Mayrant; and commissioned on 12 July 1911.

== Pre-World War I ==
Following her shakedown, Mayrant operated briefly off the New England coast before departing Newport, Rhode Island for a southerly cruise in late October. She arrived at Guantanamo Bay on 9 January 1912, participated in winter exercises in the Caribbean and then, as a unit of the Torpedo Flotilla, Atlantic Fleet, remained in the area, calling at various gulf and Caribbean ports, until spring. Returning to Newport on 14 May, she continued to operate off the east coast and in the Caribbean until 1915. Then, after completion of the 1915 winter exercises off Cuba, she steamed to the Brooklyn Navy Yard for overhaul prior to decommissioning on 20 May. On 9 November, she was moved to Philadelphia where she was berthed.

== World War I ==
Mayrant was recommissioned on 2 January 1918 and joined the wartime fleet in the spring. She was employed as an escort ship, operating along the coast and across the Atlantic. Following the Armistice, she cruised south for winter maneuvers and then cruised off the middle Atlantic coast until entering the Navy Yard at Charleston, South Carolina, for a second pre-inactivation overhaul on 21 June 1919. Departing Charleston on 16 July she sailed back to Philadelphia where she was decommissioned for a final time on 12 December 1919.

== Inter-war period ==
Designated DD-31, on 17 July 1920, she remained berthed at Philadelphia as a unit of the Reserve Fleet until 1935. On 8 March, she was struck from the Naval Register; on 28 June, she was sold to M. Block & Company, Norfolk, Virginia for scrapping.
