= USS Walke (DD-34) =

Paulding-class destroyer

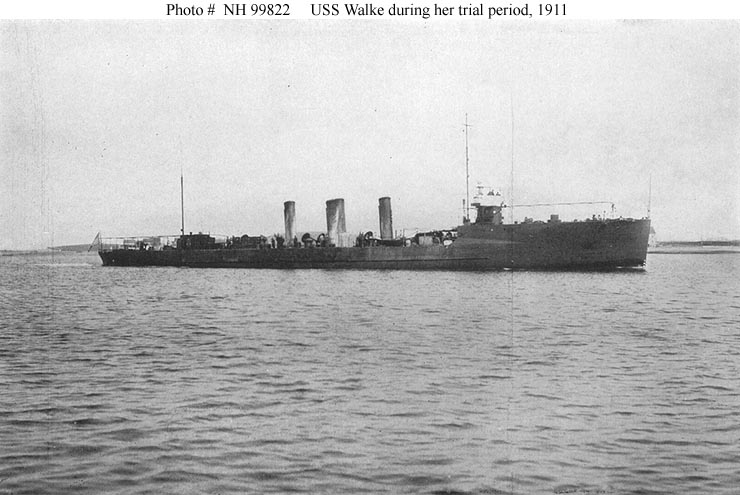
- USS Walke (DD-34) underway, during the time of her trials in 1911.

History

United States
- Name: Walke
- Namesake: Rear Admiral Henry A. Walke
- Builder: Fore River Shipbuilding Company, Quincy, Massachusetts
- Cost: $635,827.11
- Laid down: 5 March 1910
- Launched: 3 November 1910
- Sponsored by: Miss Mildred Walke Walter, granddaughter of Rear Admiral Walke
- Commissioned: 22 July 1911
- Decommissioned: 9 December 1919
- Stricken: 20 March 1935
- Identification: Hull symbol:DD-34; Code letters:NWL
- Fate: Sold, scrapped, 23 April 1935
- Notes: designation DD-34 on 17 July 1920 but lost her name 13 years later on 1 July 1933 when it was reassigned to DD-416

General characteristics
- Class & type: Paulding-class destroyer
- Displacement: 742 long tons (754 t) normal; 887 long tons (901 t) full load
- Length: 293 ft 10 in (89.56 m)
- Beam: 27 ft (8.2 m)
- Draft: 8 ft 4 in (2.54 m) (mean)
- Installed power: 12,000 ihp (8,900 kW)
- Propulsion: 4 × boilers; 2 × Parsons Direct Drive Turbines; 2 × shafts
- Speed: 29.5 kn (33.9 mph; 54.6 km/h); 29.78 kn (34.27 mph; 55.15 km/h) (Speed on Trial)
- Complement: 4 officers 87 enlisted
- Armament: 5 × 3 in (76 mm)/50 caliber guns; 6 × 18 inch (450 mm) torpedo tubes (3 × 2)

The first USS Walke (DD-34) was a Paulding-class destroyer in the United States Navy during World War I. She was named for Rear Admiral Henry A. Walke.

Walke was laid down on 5 March 1910 at Quincy, Massachusetts, by the Fore River Shipbuilding Company; launched on 3 November 1910; sponsored by Miss Mildred Walke Walter, granddaughter of Rear Admiral Walke; and commissioned on 22 July 1911 at the Boston Navy Yard.

== Pre-World War I ==
Upon commissioning, Walke was assigned to the 9th Division, Atlantic Torpedo Fleet. After fitting out at Boston, Massachusetts, she moved to the Torpedo Station at Newport, Rhode Island, where she loaded torpedoes for training with the Atlantic Torpedo Fleet. During the fall and winter, the destroyer conducted battle practice and torpedo-firing exercises with the destroyers and submarines of the torpedo fleet. In addition, she operated with the larger units of the Atlantic Fleet itself during training in more comprehensive combat drills. Those exercises covered the entire Atlantic coast from Cape Cod in the north to Cuba in the south.

Such operations occupied the destroyer until 1 November 1913, when she was placed in reserve at the New York Navy Yard. Though in reserve for the next 17 months, Walke never went out of commission; during her semi-retirement, the ship retained a commanding officer and at least a partial crew. Though not active with the Fleet, she did get underway periodically to keep her machinery in good working order while always remaining close to New York. During October and November 1914 Walke was employed in experimental deep sea diving trials which culminated in Navy diver Stephen J. Drelishak's dive to a then-record depth of 274 ft (84 m) in Long Island Sound.

In July 1915, the destroyer returned to fully active service, first to participate in the Independence Day celebration at Perth Amboy, New Jersey, and then to visit Washington, D.C., for the Grand Army of the Republic celebration in late September. By 5 October, she found herself off Newport, with the Fleet conducting maneuvers. On 1 November, Walke entered the Charleston Navy Yard for a major overhaul. Those repairs were completed at the end of February 1916; and, in March, the ship moved south to Key West to prepare for gunnery practice.

However, in May, revolutionary disorders broke out in the Dominican Republic; and Walke was dispatched to support the troops and marines landed there to restore order. From 6 May-19 June, she cruised along the coast of Hispaniola, leaving the area periodically for fuel or provisions at Ponce, Puerto Rico, or at Guantánamo Bay, Cuba. After a brief visit to Haiti, the republic occupying the western end of Hispaniola, Walke returned to Key West on 19 June. On 21 July, she arrived at the Norfolk Navy Yard to begin an eight-month overhaul.

== World War I ==
The warship completed her overhaul in March 1917 and got underway on the 25th, bound for New York. She arrived at Staten Island the following day. By coincidence, Walke entered the New York Navy Yard on 6 April 1917; the day the United States declared war on Germany. Two weeks and four days later, she emerged from the yard ready to go into action. After patrols off New York, the destroyer voyaged to Charleston, South Carolina, where she arrived on 3 May. Following a 16-day visit to Charleston, she headed north and arrived back in New York on the 20th. Three days later, she put to sea bound for European waters. Because of her limited fuel capacity, the destroyer made the first three days of the voyage under tow by the collier, Jupiter. Steaming under her own power after 26 May, she arrived in Gironde, France on 5 June. Following brief service there and at Brest, Walke moved to Queenstown on the southeastern coast of Ireland. From that port, she patrolled the western approaches to England and France, hunting for U-boats and escorting convoys into British and French ports until mid-November.

On 17 November, the warship headed back to the United States. Again after making the first leg of the transatlantic voyage under tow because of her limited range, Walke arrived in New York on 30 November. From there, she headed south to Charleston, where she entered the yard in mid-December 1917. She completed repairs in March 1918 and returned to New York on the 16th. For the remainder of World War I, Walke patrolled the coastal waters of the United States from New York north to Cape Cod and escorted incoming and departing convoys into and out of New York harbor.

== Inter-war period ==
Following the end of the war, Walke settled down to a routine of east coast operations and Atlantic Fleet exercises. Early in December 1918, she visited Baltimore, Maryland, and returned to New York on the 20th. In mid-January 1919, she moved south via Charleston to join in winter maneuvers held in the Cuba-Haiti area. Returning north by way of Key West and Miami, Florida, the destroyer reentered New York on 14 April. Between mid-April and mid-July, the warship cruised almost the entire Atlantic coast of the United States—from New York to Key West — conducting torpedo practice and various other exercises.

On 18 July, Walke arrived in Philadelphia, Pennsylvania to begin preparations for inactivation. The ship was decommissioned on 12 December.

Walke remained at the Philadelphia Navy Yard until the mid-1930s. She received the alphanumeric hull designation DD-34 on 17 July 1920 but lost her name 13 years later on 1 July 1933 when it was reassigned to DD-416. Known simply as DD-34, she was struck from the Naval Vessel Register on 20 March 1935 and was scrapped at the Philadelphia Navy Yard on 23 April 1935 under the terms of the London Naval Treaty.
