= SS Registan (1910) =

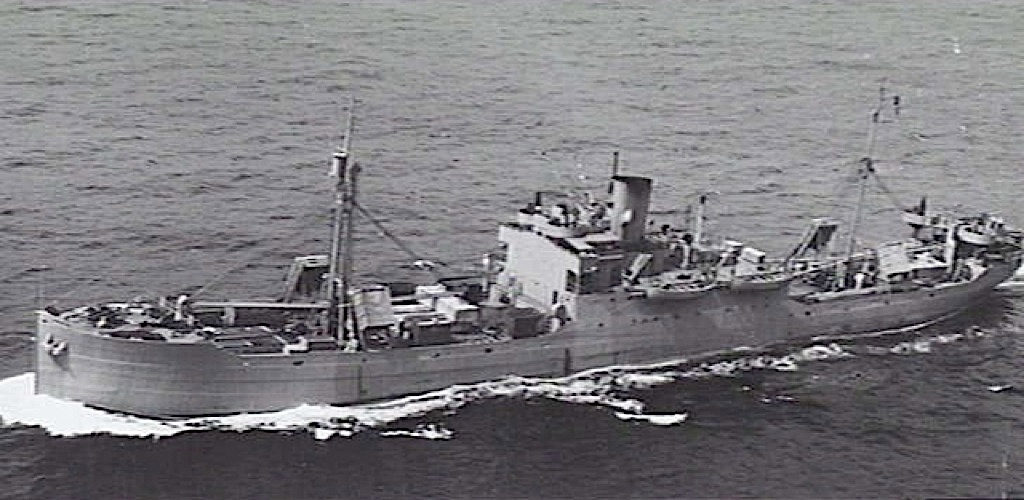
- U.S. Army Transport Grey Lag 1943

History
- Name: Registan; Guantanamo (1911); USS Guantanamo (ID-1637) 21 May 1918 – 25 January 1919; Comerio (1927); Vittorin (1940); Grey Lag (1941); USAT Grey Lag (Oct 43‑ after Apr 46); Hai Lung (1946), scrapped 1960.
- Owner: Anglo-Algerian S.S. Co., Ltd.; Cia. Cubana de Navegacion (1911); New York & Cuba Mail Steamship Co. (1914); U.S.Navy (1918–1919); New York & Porto Rico S.S. Co. (1927); Agwilines Inc. (1935); Comm. Giuseppe Bozzo, Genoa (1940); U.S. Maritime Commission/War Shipping Administration (1941); China Merchants' Steam navigation Co. Ltd.(1946)
- Builder: William Gray & Company Ltd., West Hartlepool, County Durham
- Launched: 9 May 1910
- Fate: Scrapped 1960

General characteristics
- Tonnage: 3,293 GRT; 3,412 GRT
- Length: 350 ft 7 in (106.9 m)
- Beam: 46 ft 5 in (14.1 m)
- Height: 86 ft (26 m) bridge
- Draught: 22 ft 4 in (6.8 m)
- Speed: 10 kts

Registan, built 1910, was the first name for a ship serving fifty years under the later names Guantanamo, USS Guantanamo (ID-1637), Comerio, Vittorin, Grey Lag and finally Hai Lung until scrapping in 1960. The ship transported gunpowder and munitions during World War I as USS Guantanamo and as a cargo ship during World War II for the War Shipping Administration (WSA). After 12 October 1943 the ship was assigned to the Southwest Pacific Area command's permanent local fleet as the United States Army transport Grey Lag with that fleet's number X-101. In April 1945 she was one of the transports towing large barges from Australia and New Guinea to the Philippines after that concept to mitigate shipping shortages had been proven feasible. In 1946 the ship was sold to the Republic of China and renamed Hai Lung.

== Construction ==
The cargo ship Registan was built and launched on 9 May 1910 by William Gray & Company Ltd., West Hartlepool, County Durham, United Kingdom with engines supplied by Central Marine Engine Works of the same city for Anglo-Algerian Steamship Co. (1896) Ltd., an operating line of the Frank C. Strick & Company. The ship was completed in July of that year. The Anglo-Algerian Steamship Co. had been founded to transport coal from South Wales to France and with the sister company, merged to form Strick Line in 1913, extended to serve Mediterranean ports and the Persian Gulf.

This was the second ship of the name to operate for the company with five more to follow with the seventh built 1973.

== Operational history ==
Very shortly after delivery Registan was sold in 1911 to the New York and Cuba Mail Steamship Company and renamed Guantanamo. The ship was operating with that company until World War I military shipping requirements ended her civilian career for the duration.

=== USS Guantanamo ===
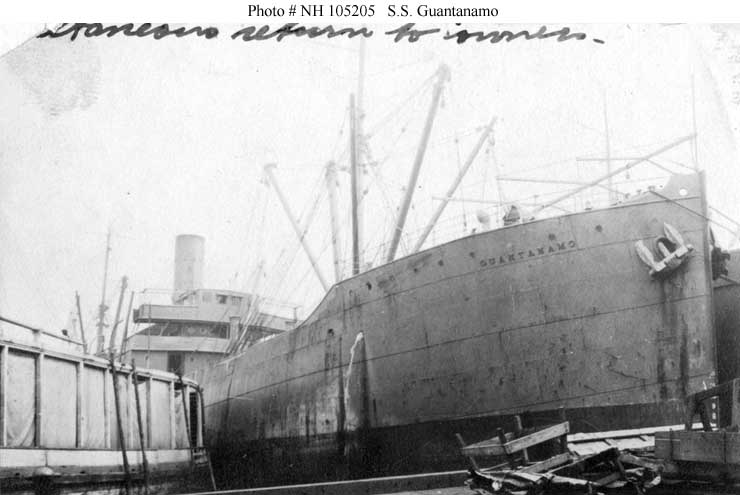
S.S. Guantanamo served as USS Guantanamo (ID # 1637) from 20 May 1918 to 25 January 1919.

During 1917 Guantanamo was inspected by the Third Naval District for use in 1919. On 25 February 1918, the ship was turned over to the U.S. Navy at Philadelphia, commissioned on 21 May 1918 as USS Guantanamo (ID-1637), and began service transporting gunpowder and ammunition to forces in Europe. The ship made three voyages in convoy before arriving in New York on 11 December 1918 and being decommissioned on 25 January 1919. The ship was returned to her owners, New York and Cuba Mail Steamship Company.

=== Interwar years ===
In 1927 Guantanamo was renamed Comerio operating with another subsidiary of the same line and in 1940 sold to Italian interests and renamed Vittorin.

=== World War II ===
Vittorin, idle at Norfolk, Virginia since June 1940, was detained at March 1941 and seized under the Act of June 6, 1941, Public Law 101-77th Congress, 46 U.S.C.A. which provided for seizure "during such emergency charter or requisition the use of, or take over the title to, or the possession of, for such use or disposition as he shall direct, any foreign merchant vessel which is lying idle in waters within the jurisdiction of the United States, including the Philippine Islands and the Canal Zone, and which is necessary to the national defense" with ownership passing to the War Shipping Administration.

The ship, renamed Grey Lag, was placed in service 15 October 1941 with South Atlantic Steamship Company as the WSA operating agent. On 2 October 1941 at New York WSA changed the operating agent to U.S. Navigation Company. Effective 22 January 1943 at Brooklyn, New York the ship was bareboat chartered to the War Department for operation by the U.S. Army.

By 12 October 1943 Grey Lag had arrived in the Southwest Pacific Area and was incorporated into the Army's permanent local fleet operating under the U.S. Army Services of Supply (USASOS SWPA) of General MacArthur's command. The ship's dispatch to SWPA was in response to a request for hulls of "moderate draft" of between 4,000 and 6,000 dwt suitable for troop and cargo operations in the islands north of Australia with limited and shallow ports. In particular ships built on the Great Lakes, where size was determined by locks, were suitable with the requirement being met by ships generally termed "Lakers" or "Lake-Type Vessels" whether or not the ships were actual Lake vessels; though the majority delivered had been built and operated there. Grey Lag, though definitely not of Great Lakes origin, was one of the "Lakers" delivered under the request.

By 1 December Grey Lag was one of fifty-two ships of the mixed fleet composed at the time largely of Dutch vessels, mostly Koninklijke Paketvaart-Maatschappij (KPM) ships from the Netherlands East Indies, and other allied vessels from Singapore and the Japanese conquest of the Indies that had sought refuge in Australian ports. The ship was assigned the local fleet designation number of X-101. By 15 July 1944 the ship was in a group assigned to the sub-fleet of ships operating in the New Guinea coastwise service (ADSOS Fleet) as AX-101.

With a shortage of tugs, the invasion of the Philippines underway and an urgent need to move small and unpowered craft with cargo from New Guinea to Leyte, Grey Lag acted as a tow and as a cargo vessel.

=== Post war ===
Sometime after 27 April 1946 Grey Lag was released from Army service, acquired by Coastwise Steamship and sold on 19 September 1946 to the Republic of China, Shanghai represented by the Chinese Supply Commission. The ship was renamed Hai Lang and operated until scrapped in Taiwan January 1960.

== See also ==
- Operation Lilliput
- Western New Guinea campaign

== References cited ==
- Grover, David (1987). U.S. Army Ships and Watercraft of World War II. Naval Institute Press. ISBN 0-87021-766-6. LCCN 87015514.
- Lloyds (1942–1943). Lloyd's Register (PDF). Lloyd's Register.
- Maritime Administration. "Grey Lag". Ship History Database Vessel Status Card. Maritime Administration. Archived from the original on June 6, 2014.
- Naval History And Heritage Command. "Guantanamo". Dictionary of American Naval Fighting Ships. Naval History And Heritage Command. Archived from the original on March 13, 2004.
- Naval History And Heritage Command: Online Library of Selected Images (5 August 2007). "'S.S. Guantanamo (American Freighter, 1910)". Online Library of Selected Images—Civilian Ships. Naval History And Heritage Command. Archived from the original on December 5, 2007.
- Swiggum, S; Kohli, S.M. (September 8, 2010). "Frank C. Strick & Co. / Strick Line". TheShipsList.
- Teesside Ship Society. "William Gray & Company Ltd., West Hartlepool: Registan". Shipbuilding on the River Tees.
- Masterson, Dr. James R. (1949). U. S. Army Transportation In The Southwest Pacific Area 1941–1947. Washington, D. C.: Transportation Unit, Historical Division, Special Staff, U. S. Army.
- United States District Court, E.D. New York (31 January 1942). "The VILLARPEROSA". Archived from the original on June 6, 2014.
