= USS McCall (DD-28) =

Paulding-class destroyer

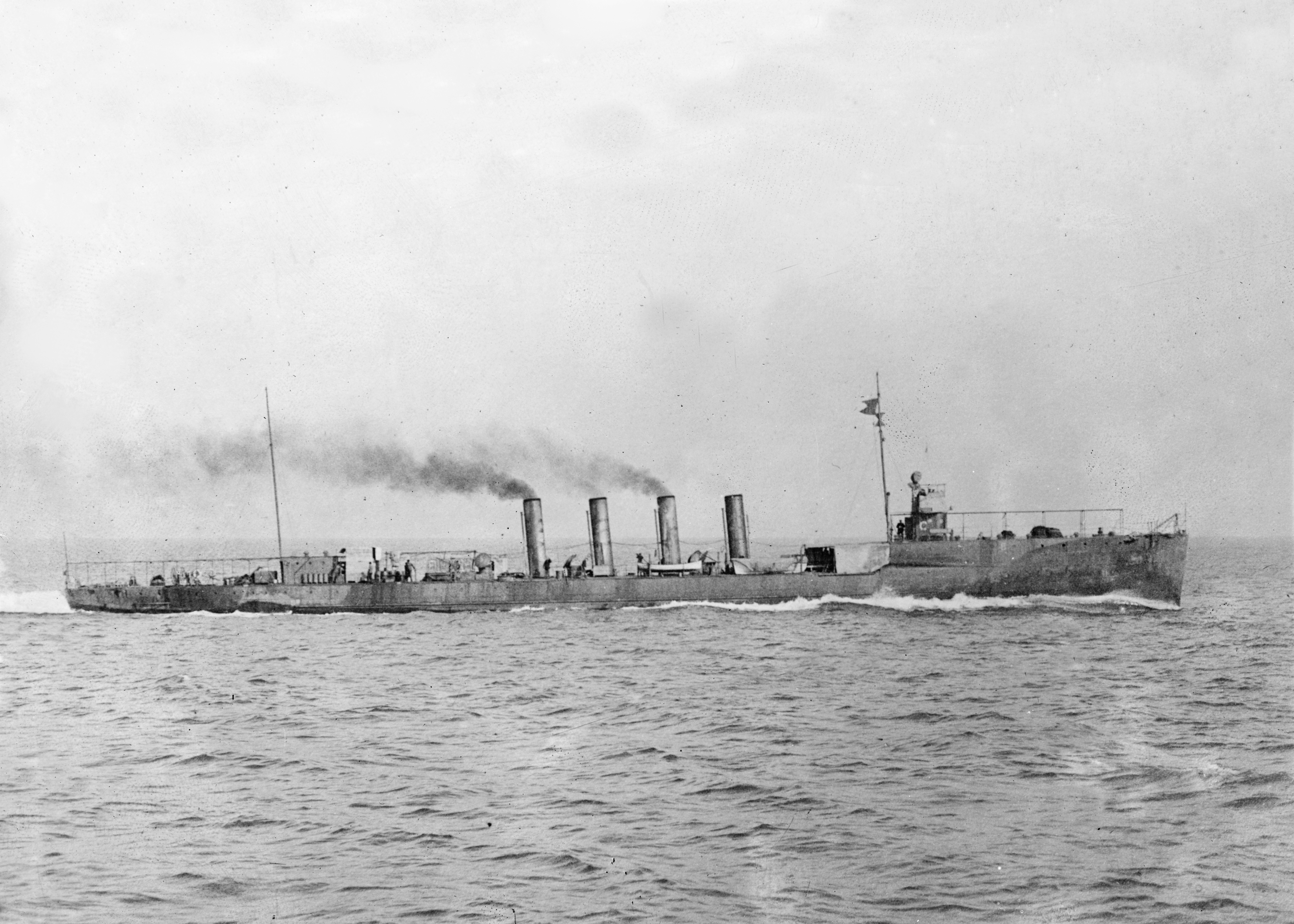

History

United States
- Name: McCall
- Namesake: Captain Edward McCall awarded Congressional Gold Medal
- Builder: New York Shipbuilding Company, Camden, New Jersey
- Cost: $683,944.76
- Laid down: 9 June 1909
- Launched: 4 June 1910
- Sponsored by: Miss Jessie Willits
- Commissioned: 23 January 1911
- Decommissioned: 12 December 1919
- Stricken: 28 June 1934
- Identification: Hull symbol:DD-28; Code letters:NJW
- Fate: Transferred to United States Coast Guard

United States
- Name: McCall
- Acquired: 7 June 1924
- Commissioned: 17 June 1925
- Decommissioned: 20 December 1929
- Identification: Hull symbol:CG-14
- Fate: Returned to United States Navy, 18 October 1930 and scrapped in 1934

General characteristics
- Class & type: Paulding-class destroyer
- Displacement: 742 long tons (754 t) normal; 887 long tons (901 t) full load
- Length: 293 ft 10 in (89.56 m)
- Beam: 27 ft (8.2 m)
- Draft: 8 ft 4 in (2.54 m) (mean)
- Installed power: 12,000 ihp (8,900 kW)
- Propulsion: 4 × boilers; 3 × Parsons Direct Drive Turbines; 3 × shafts
- Speed: 29.5 kn (33.9 mph; 54.6 km/h); 30.66 kn (35.28 mph; 56.78 km/h) (Speed on Trial)
- Complement: 4 officers 78 enlisted
- Armament: 5 × 3 in (76 mm)/50 caliber guns; 6 × 18 inch (450 mm) torpedo tubes (3 × 2)

USS McCall (DD-28) was a Paulding-class destroyer in the United States Navy during World War I and later in the United States Coast Guard, designated CG-14. She was the first ship named for Edward McCall.

McCall was laid down on 8 June 1909 by the New York Shipbuilding Company, Camden, New Jersey, launched on 4 June 1910, sponsored by Miss Jessie Willits, and commissioned on 23 January 1911.

== United States Navy ==
Attached to the Torpedo Flotilla, Atlantic Fleet, McCall operated along the Atlantic coast, primarily out of Newport, Rhode Island and the Chesapeake Bay area. Each winter found her with the fleet in Cuban waters for maneuvers.

In 1916, McCall made Neutrality Patrols off New York and along the New England coast. On 14 June 1917, following overhaul at Philadelphia, Pennsylvania, she steamed to New York to escort a troop convoy to Europe. The destroyer continued escort duties in the western Atlantic until January 1918, when she sailed for Queenstown, Ireland. Arriving there on 22 February, she provided escort and rescue services until 16 December.

Upon return to the United States in January 1919, she resumed east coast operations until decommissioning at Philadelphia on 12 December 1919 and placed in the reserve fleet.

== United States Coast Guard ==
McCall was transferred to the United States Coast Guard on 7 June 1924 and commissioned into service 17 June 1925 after a lengthy overhaul. Stationed at New London, Connecticut, she was part of the Rum Patrol. The Coast Guard decommissioned her 12 August 1930. She was returned to the Navy on 18 October 1930, and was scrapped and sold on 2 May 1934, in accordance with the London Naval Treaty.
