= Edward McCall =

Captain Edward R. McCall (5 August 1790 – 1 August 1853) was an officer in the United States Navy during the War of 1812. He was awarded a Congressional Gold Medal.

== Biography ==
Born in South Carolina, McCall was appointed midshipman 1 January 1808. Appointed acting lieutenant in brig Enterprise 16 October 1811, he took command of his ship during her action with HMS Boxer 5 September 1813, early in which Enterprise's captain, Lieutenant William Ward Burrows II, was mortally wounded. In acknowledgment of his victory over Boxer, McCall received the Thanks of Congress and a Congressional Gold Medal.

Promoted to captain 3 March 1835, he died at his home in Bordentown, New Jersey, 1 August 1853.

Two ships have been named USS McCall for him.

== Congressional Gold Medal citation ==
That the President of the United States be requested to present to the nearest male relative of lieutenant William Burrows, and to lieutenant Edward R. McCall of the brig Enterprise, a gold medal with suitable emblems and devices; and a silver medal with like emblems and devices to each of the commissioned officers of the aforesaid vessel, in testimony of the high sense entertained in the conflict with the British sloop Boxer, on the fourth of September, in the year one thousand eight hundred and thirteen. And the President is also requested to communicate to the nearest male relative of lieutenant Burrows the deep regret which Congress feel for the loss of that valuable officer, who died in the arms of victory, nobly contending for his country's rights and fame.
