= USS Perkins (DD-26) =

Paulding-class destroyer

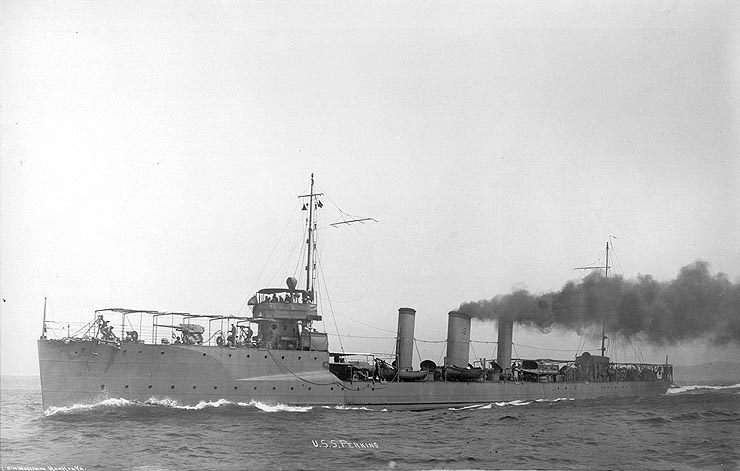
- USS Perkins (DD-26) underway in 1912.

History

United States
- Name: Perkins
- Namesake: Commodore George H. Perkins
- Builder: Fore River Shipbuilding Company, Quincy, Massachusetts
- Cost: $603,166.04
- Laid down: 22 March 1909
- Launched: 9 April 1910
- Sponsored by: Isabel Weld Perkins daughter of Commodore Perkins
- Commissioned: 18 November 1910
- Decommissioned: 5 December 1919
- Stricken: 8 March 1935
- Identification: Hull symbol:DD-26; Code letters:NOX
- Fate: Sold 28 June 1935

General characteristics
- Class & type: Paulding-class destroyer
- Displacement: 742 long tons (754 t) normal; 887 long tons (901 t) full load
- Length: 293 ft 10 in (89.56 m)
- Beam: 27 ft (8.2 m)
- Draft: 8 ft 4 in (2.54 m) (mean)
- Installed power: 12,000 ihp (8,900 kW)
- Propulsion: 4 × boilers; 2 × Parsons Direct Drive Turbines; 2 × shafts
- Speed: 29.5 kn (33.9 mph; 54.6 km/h); 29.76 kn (34.25 mph; 55.12 km/h) (Speed on Trial)
- Complement: 4 officers 87 enlisted
- Armament: 5 × 3 in (76 mm)/50 caliber guns; 6 × 18 inch (450 mm) torpedo tubes (3 × 2)

USS Perkins (DD-26) was a modified Paulding-class destroyer in the United States Navy during World War I. She was the first ship named for Commodore George H. Perkins.

Perkins was laid down on 22 March 1909 by the Fore River Shipbuilding Company, Quincy, Massachusetts, christened by Commodore Perkins' daughter Isabel Weld Perkins and launched from the Fore River on 9 April 1910. Perkins was commissioned on 18 November 1910, Lieutenant Commander Joel R. P. Pringle in command.

== Service history ==
After almost seven years of peacetime service with active and reserve destroyer squadrons, Perkins recommissioned on 3 April 1917. Assigned to the second division of United States destroyer forces in Europe, a division which included Paulding, Wilkes, and Ammen, she operated out of Queenstown, Ireland, from June into November 1917.

During this duty, she rescued survivors of Tarquah on 7 August, and escorted Bohemia from Saint Nazaire to Ireland and New York from Queenstown to Liverpool. In November 1917 she departed Ireland for New York, New York.

During the winter of 1917–1918, she underwent overhaul at Charleston, South Carolina. From March to December 1918 she operated out of Gravesend Bay, New York, on anti-submarine patrol and escort duty. She sighted German submarine U-151 off New Jersey on 2 June 1918. On convoy duty, she escorted various ships, including President Grant and President Washington, between Halifax, Nova Scotia and New York.

Entering the Reserve Fleet on 5 December 1919, she remained there until she was struck from the Naval Vessel Register on 8 March 1935, sold on 28 June, and scrapped.
