= USS Sterett (DD-27) =

Paulding-class destroyer

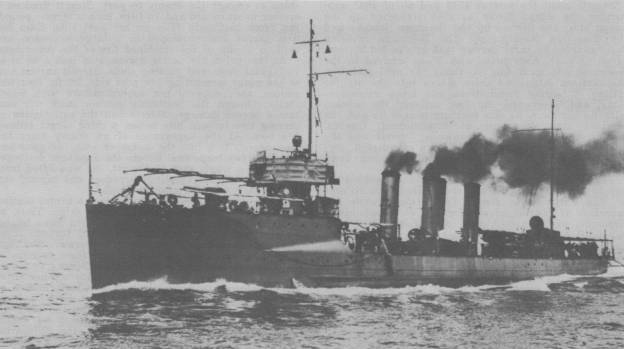
- USS Sterett (DD-27) underway, circa 1912.

History

United States
- Name: Sterett
- Namesake: Master Commandant Andrew Sterett
- Builder: Fore River Shipbuilding Company, Quincy, Massachusetts
- Cost: $617,474.90
- Laid down: 22 March 1909
- Launched: 12 May 1910
- Sponsored by: Miss Dorothy Rosalie Sterett Gittings
- Commissioned: 15 December 1910
- Decommissioned: 9 December 1919
- Stricken: 8 March 1935
- Identification: Hull symbol:DD-26; Code letters:NTB
- Fate: Sold June 28, 1935 to M. Black & Co., Norfolk

General characteristics
- Class & type: Paulding-class destroyer
- Displacement: 742 long tons (754 t) normal; 887 long tons (901 t) full load
- Length: 293 ft 10 in (89.56 m)
- Beam: 27 ft (8.2 m)
- Draft: 8 ft 4 in (2.54 m) (mean)
- Installed power: 12,000 ihp (8,900 kW)
- Propulsion: 4 × boilers; 2 × Parsons Direct Drive Turbines; 2 × shafts
- Speed: 29.5 kn (33.9 mph; 54.6 km/h); 30.37 kn (34.95 mph; 56.25 km/h) (Speed on Trial)
- Complement: 4 officers 87 enlisted
- Armament: 5 × 3 in (76 mm)/50 caliber guns; 6 × 18 inch (450 mm) torpedo tubes (3 × 2)

USS Sterett (DD-27) was a modified Paulding-class destroyer in the United States Navy during World War I. She was the first ship named for Andrew Sterett.

Sterett was laid down on 22 March 1909 at Quincy, Massachusetts, by the Fore River Shipbuilding Company. Sponsored by Miss Dorothy Rosalie Sterett Gittings, the destroyer was launched on 12 May 1910 and commissioned on 15 December 1910 at Boston, Massachusetts.

== Pre-World War I ==
Each year until 1913, Sterett operated along the east coast out of Boston from April to December and, from January to April, participated in training and battle exercises out of Guantanamo Bay, Cuba. Though placed in reserve on 5 November 1913, she continued duty with the torpedo fleet. On 20 January 1914, she sailed from Charleston, South Carolina, and reached New Orleans, Louisiana, on 2 March, after stops at Cape Canaveral, Miami, Key West, Florida, and at Mobile, Alabama. The following day, she joined the newly created Reserve Torpedo Flotilla, operating in the Gulf of Mexico out of Galveston, Texas. In June, she returned to the Atlantic seaboard, this time based at Norfolk, Virginia, and resumed coastal patrols and Caribbean exercises. Sterett's complement was reduced on 5 January 1916 and, throughout that spring; she operated almost exclusively in the Caribbean.

On 1 June, she was a part of the fleet which landed and supported the Marines at Monte Cristi, Dominican Republic, and marched to Santiago to restore order and to protect lives and property. Soon thereafter, Sterett returned to Norfolk and resumed operations along the east coast. On 1 January 1917, she entered the Mississippi, stopped at New Orleans, and steamed up river to Vicksburg, Mississippi. She reentered the gulf and patrolled the Texas coast until she was shifted to Key West on 18 March. From there, the destroyer ranged as far as the Cuban coast.

== World War I ==
In April 1917, the United States entered World War I, and by 9 June, Sterett was in Queenstown, Ireland. Throughout the remainder of the war, she operated from Queenstown to meet convoys and conduct them to either Berehaven, Ireland, or to Devonport, England. At these points, British and French destroyers assumed responsibility for the last leg of the voyage. A little less than a year after her arrival at Queenstown, on 31 May 1918, Sterett was herding a convoy toward the rendezvous point when she came upon a surfaced U-boat. As Sterett closed, the submarine rapidly submerged. Sterett began dropping depth charges furiously, and air bubbles and oil soon appeared on the surface, indicating damage to the German raider.

After exhausting her supply of depth charges, Sterett pursued the enemy by the U-boat's wake of bubbles and trail of oil, hoping to force her to exhaust her batteries and air supply. She continued the pursuit through the night, guided in the darkness only by the fumes of the sub's leaking oil. Finally, at dawn, the destroyer's persistence was rewarded. She sighted the U-boat on the surface about 1,000 yd (910 m) ahead. Sterett sliced through the waves at top speed seeking to ram the submarine, but the U-boat countered by swinging hard to port. Sterett passed within 20 ft (6.1 m) of the submarine and, as the U-boat attempted to dive, brought her guns to bear. However, without sufficient time to bracket their adversary, Sterett's gunners watched helplessly as the submarine slid beneath the surface and escaped. For their dogged determination, the officers and men of Sterett received the commendation of the Commander-in-Chief, Coast of Ireland.

The year 1918 brought with it an all-out effort on the part of the Central Powers to bring the war to a successful conclusion. The German Navy increased the intensity of its submarine operations in order to free Germany from the Allies' ever-tightening blockade. In response to this thrust, Sterett maintained a grueling schedule of convoy duty-a week or more at sea followed by a day or two in port. One of her new techniques, the use of airborne surveillance, presaged modern hunter-killer antisubmarine warfare.

== Inter-war period ==
The Allies prevailed, however, and the Armistice, signed on 11 November, brought an end to Sterett's strenuous duty; and, by 3 January 1919, she was back in the United States at Charleston. From there, she moved to Philadelphia, Pennsylvania, where she was decommissioned on 9 December. On 9 March 1935, after a little more than 15 years of inactivity, Sterett was struck from the Naval Vessel Register. On 28 June, she was sold for scrapping to M. Black and Company of Norfolk, Virginia.
