= Paulding-class destroyer =

Destroyer class of the US Navy

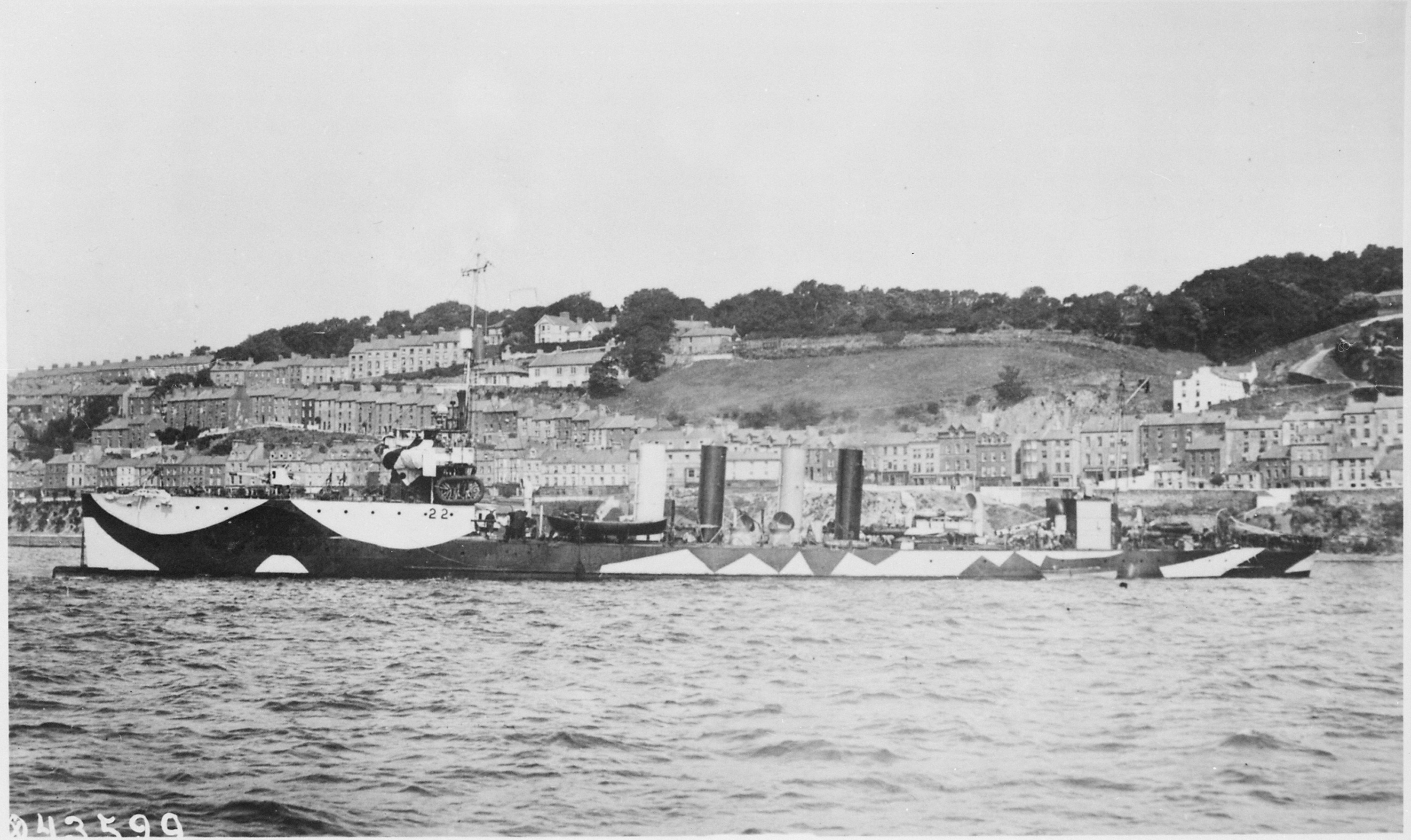
- USS Paulding at Queenstown, Ireland in 1918

Class overview
- Name: Paulding class
- Builders: Bath Iron Works, ME (5); Newport News Shipbuilding, VA (4); Fore River Ship & Engine Co., MA (4); New York Shipbuilding, NJ (4); William Cramp & Sons, PA (4)
- Operators: United States Navy; United States Coast Guard
- Preceded by: Smith class
- Succeeded by: Cassin class
- Subclasses: Monaghan
- Built: 1908–1912
- In commission: 1910–1931
- Completed: 21
- Retired: 21

General characteristics
- Type: Destroyer
- Displacement: 742 long tons (754 t) (normal); 887 long tons (901 t) (full load)
- Length: 293 ft 0 in (89.31 m) overall
- Beam: 26 ft 3 in (8.00 m)
- Draft: 8 ft 0 in (2.44 m)
- Installed power: 4 × oil-fired Normand boilers (other boilers also used); 3 × Parsons direct-drive steam turbines; 12,000 shp (8,900 kW) (design)
- Propulsion: 3 × shafts
- Speed: 29.5 kn (54.6 km/h; 33.9 mph) (design)
- Range: 3,000 nmi (5,600 km; 3,500 mi) at 16 kn (30 km/h; 18 mph)
- Capacity: 241 long tons (245 t) oil (fuel)
- Complement: 4 officers; 82 enlisted
- Armament: 5 × 3 in (76 mm)/50 caliber guns; 3 × twin 18 inch (450 mm) torpedo tubes

The Paulding-class destroyers were a series of United States Navy destroyers derived from the Smith class with the torpedo tubes increased from three to six via twin mounts. They were the first destroyers in the US Navy with oil-fired boilers. The 21 Pauldings doubled the number of destroyers in the US Navy. The Paulding class derived its name from the class's lead ship, Paulding, named for Rear Admiral Hiram Paulding (1797–1878). Like the Smiths, they were nicknamed "flivvers" after the small and shaky Model T Ford once the larger "thousand tonner" destroyers entered service.

== Authorisation ==
The Act of 13 May 1908 made provision for "...Ten torpedo-boat destroyers, to have the highest practicable speed, and to cost, exclusive of armament, not to exceed eight hundred thousand dollars each, to be built by contract, not more than three by any one contractor...." The Act of 3 March 1909 made provision for "...Five torpedo-boat destroyers, to have the highest practicable speed, and to cost, exclusive of armament, not to exceed eight hundred thousand dollars each...." The Act of 24 June 1910 made provision for "...Six torpedo-boat destroyers, to have the highest practicable speed, and to cost in all not to exceed seven hundred and fifty thousand dollars each, and toward the construction of said torpedo-boat destroyers the sum of two million two hundred and twenty-five thousand dollars is hereby appropriated...."

Generally 21 ships, hull numbers 22 through 42, are considered Pauldings. However, some references list hull numbers 32 through 42 as the Monaghan class. Others break out hulls 24–28, 30, 31, 33 and 36 as Roe class, with hulls 32, 35, and 38–42 as Monaghan class. Curiously, Jane's Fighting Ships of World War I refers to hulls 22–42 as the 21 [ships of the] Drayton class, going on to say "Unofficially known as 'Flivver Type'"; the book includes Paulding in the class listing, but not as the class leader.

== Design ==
=== Armament ===
The torpedo armament was six 18-inch (450 mm) torpedo tubes in three twin mounts. This was an easy upgrade from the three single tubes with reloads of the Smith class, as the new design twin mounts actually weighed less than the older single mounts. The gun armament was the same as the Smith class, with five 3-inch (76 mm)/50 caliber guns. During World War I, one or two depth charge tracks were equipped for the convoy escort mission.

=== Engineering ===
There was some variation in engineering among the ships of this class. The most visible was that hulls 24–27, 30–32, 34, 36, 37, 39, and 40 had three stacks instead of four, with the middle stack being larger as two boiler uptakes were trunked together in it. Most of the ships' direct drive turbines were arranged as in the Smith class on three shafts, with a high-pressure center turbine exhausting to two low-pressure turbines on the outboard shafts. Cruising turbines were also fitted on the outboard shafts in these ships to improve fuel economy at low speeds. However, hulls 26–27, 30–31, and 34 had two turbines on two shafts (Zoelly or Curtis), with cruising stages included in the turbine casings.

This was the first USN destroyer class with oil-fired boilers. Compared with the Smith class, the Pauldings had 12,000 shaft horsepower (8,900 kW) instead of 10,000 shp (7,500 kW), making them about a knot faster. From DD-32 on, most references state that Thornycroft boilers instead of Normand were equipped. However, the Navy's official Ships' Data Book for 1911 shows that other types of boilers were used as well, including Yarrow and White-Forster.

Paulding made 32.8 knots (60.7 km/h; 37.7 mph) on trials at 17,393 shp (12,970 kW). Normal fuel oil capacity was 241 tons with a design range of 3,000 nautical miles (5,600 km; 3,500 mi) at 16 knots (30 km/h; 18 mph).

== Service ==
The Pauldings were commissioned in 1910–1912 and were active throughout World War I, primarily as convoy escorts in the Atlantic. They were equipped with one or two depth charge tracks for this mission. All served in the United States Navy; twelve were transferred to the United States Coast Guard 1924–30 for the Rum Patrol; and all were scrapped 1934–35 to comply with the London Naval Treaty.

== Ships in class ==
Ships of Paulding destroyer class
Name	Hull no.	Shipyard	Laid down	Launched	Commissioned	Decommissioned	Fate
Paulding	DD-22	Bath Iron Works, Bath, Maine	24 July 1909	12 April 1910	29 September 1910	August 1919	USCG 1924–30, scrapped 1934
Drayton	DD-23	Bath Iron Works	19 August 1909	22 August 1910	29 October 1910	17 November 1919	Scrapped 1935
Roe	DD-24	Newport News Shipbuilding, Newport News, Virginia	19 January 1909	24 July 1909	17 September 1910	December 1919	USCG 1924–30, scrapped 1934
Terry	DD-25	Newport News Shipbuilding	8 February 1909	21 August 1909	18 October 1910	13 November 1919	USCG 1924–30, scrapped 1934
Perkins	DD-26	Fore River Ship and Engine, Quincy, Massachusetts	22 March 1909	9 April 1910	18 November 1910	5 December 1919	Scrapped 1935
Sterett	DD-27	Fore River Ship and Engine	22 March 1909	12 May 1910	15 December 1910	9 December 1919	Scrapped 1935
McCall	DD-28	New York Shipbuilding, Camden, New Jersey	8 June 1909	4 June 1910	23 January 1911	12 December 1919	USCG 1924–30, scrapped 1934
Burrows	DD-29	New York Shipbuilding	19 June 1909	23 June 1910	21 February 1911	12 December 1919	USCG 1925–31, scrapped 1934
Warrington	DD-30	William Cramp & Sons, Philadelphia	21 June 1909	18 June 1910	20 March 1911	31 January 1920	Scrapped 1935
Mayrant	DD-31	William Cramp & Sons	22 April 1909	23 April 1910	12 July 1911	12 December 1919	Scrapped 1935
Monaghan	DD-32	Newport News Shipbuilding	1 June 1910	18 February 1911	21 June 1911	4 November 1919	USCG 1924–31, scrapped 1934
Trippe	DD-33	Bath Iron Works	12 April 1910	20 December 1910	23 March 1911	6 November 1919	USCG 1924–31, scrapped 1934
Walke	DD-34	Fore River Ship and Engine	5 March 1910	3 November 1910	22 July 1911	12 December 1919	Scrapped 1935
Ammen	DD-35	New York Shipbuilding	29 March 1910	20 September 1910	23 May 1911	11 December 1919	USCG 1924–31, scrapped 1934
Patterson	DD-36	William Cramp & Sons	29 March 1910	29 April 1911	11 October 1911	1 January 1919	USCG 1924–30, scrapped 1934
Fanning	DD-37	Newport News Shipbuilding	29 April 1911	11 January 1912	21 June 1912	24 November 1919	USCG 1924–30, scrapped 1934
Jarvis	DD-38	New York Shipbuilding	1 July 1911	4 April 1912	22 October 1912	26 November 1919	Scrapped 1935
Henley	DD-39	Fore River Ship and Engine	17 July 1911	3 April 1912	6 December 1912	12 December 1919	USCG 1924–31, scrapped 1934
Beale	DD-40	William Cramp & Sons	8 May 1911	30 April 1912	30 August 1912	25 October 1919	USCG 1924–30, scrapped 1934
Jouett	DD-41	Bath Iron Works	7 March 1911	15 April 1912	24 May 1912	24 November 1919	USCG 1924–31, scrapped 1935
Jenkins	DD-42	Bath Iron Works	24 March 1911	29 April 1912	15 June 1912	31 October 1919	Scrapped 1935

== Gallery ==
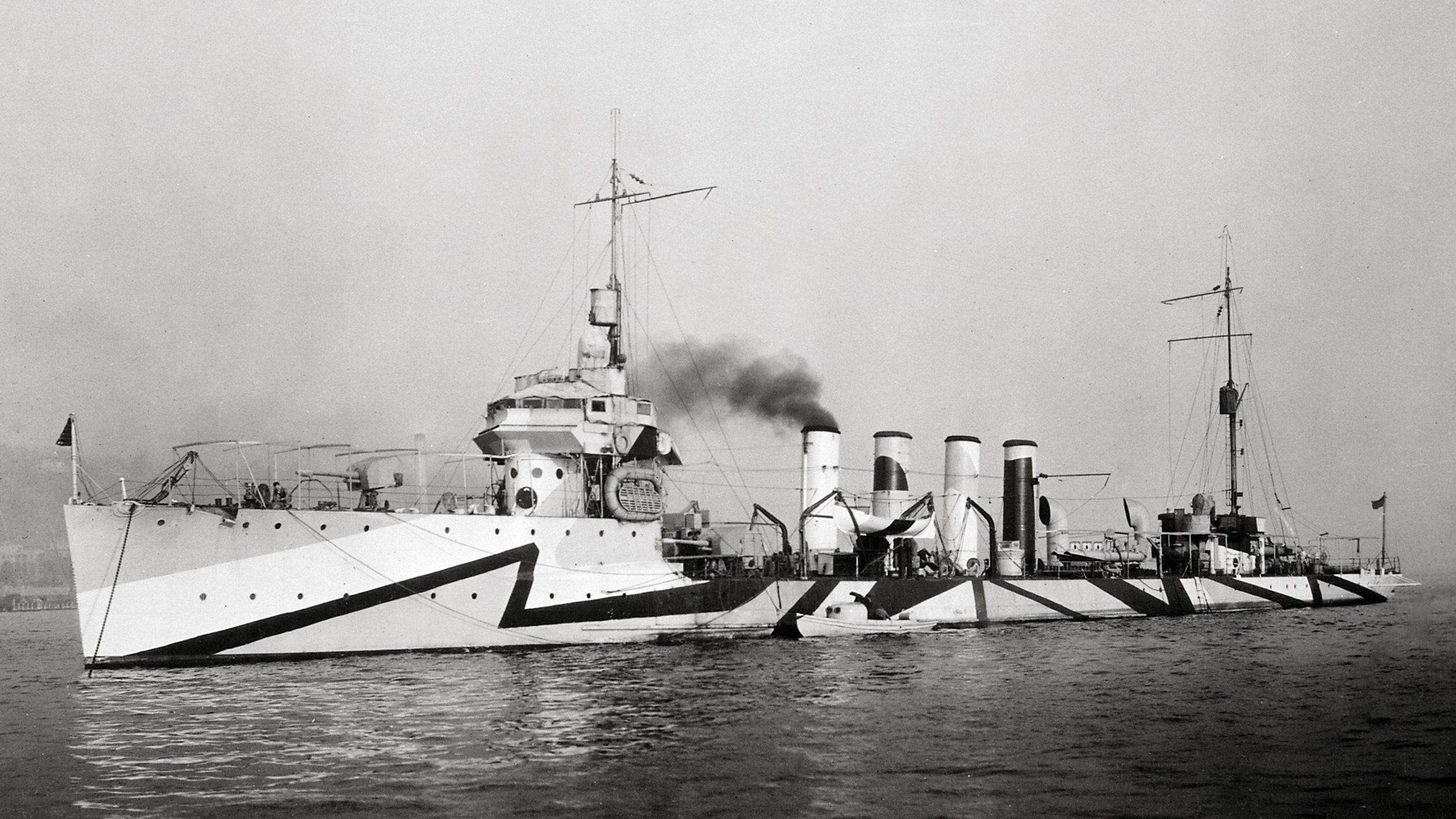
Henley in dazzle camouflage

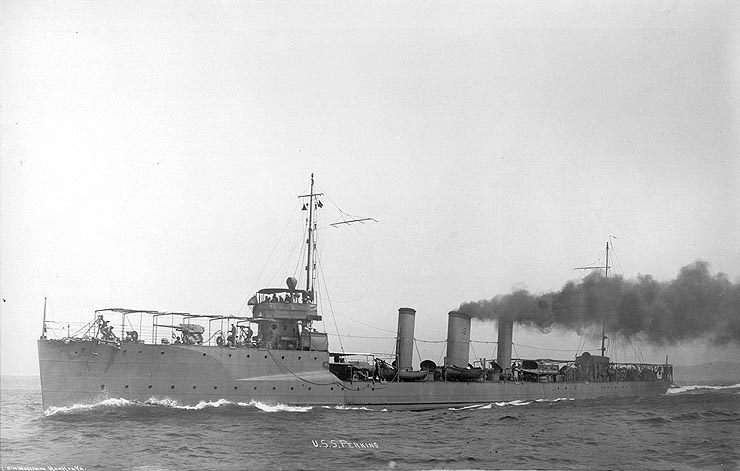
Perkins with three stack design

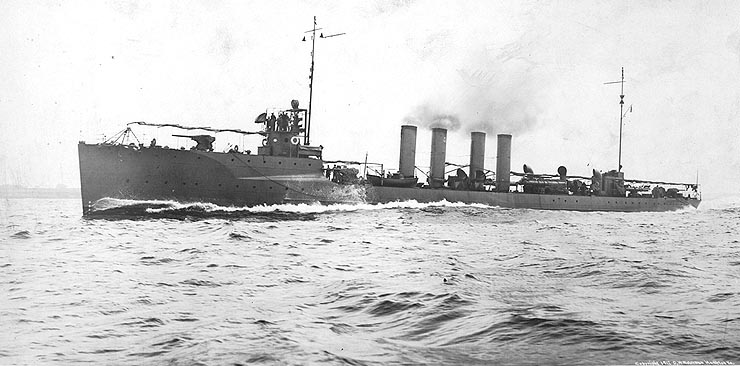
Trippe with four stacks

== See also ==
- Smith-class destroyer

== Bibliography ==
- Bauer, K. Jack; Roberts, Stephen S. (1991). Register of Ships of the U.S. Navy, 1775–1990: Major Combatants. Westport, Connecticut: Greenwood Press. ISBN 0-313-26202-0.
- Friedman, Norman (2004). US Destroyers: An Illustrated Design History (Revised ed.). Annapolis: Naval Institute Press. ISBN 1-55750-442-3.
- Gardiner, Robert; Gray, Randal (1985). Conway's All the World's Fighting Ships 1906-1921. London: Conway Maritime Press. ISBN 0-85177-245-5.
- Jane's Fighting Ships of World War I. London: Random House Group, Ltd. 2001. ISBN 1-85170-378-0.
- Silverstone, Paul H. (1970). U.S. Warships of World War I. London: Ian Allan. ISBN 0-71100-095-6.
