= List of ship commissionings in 1909 =

The list of ship commissionings in 1909 is a chronological list of ships commissioned in 1909.

Date	Operator	Ship	Flag	Class and type	Pennant	Other notes
9 February	Royal Navy	Defence		Minotaur-class cruiser		
27 February	Royal Navy	Bellerophon		Bellerophon-class battleship		
20 March	Royal Navy	Invincible		Invincible-class battlecruiser		
15 May	Royal Navy	Temeraire		Bellerophon-class battleship		
29 May	Royal Navy	Superb		Bellerophon-class battleship		
May (date unknown)	Spanish Navy	Almirante Lobo		Transport		
16 June	United States Navy	Lamson		Smith-class destroyer	DD-18	
10 July	Imperial German Navy	Emden		Dresden-class cruiser		
1 October	Imperial German Navy	Blücher		Unique armored cruiser		
1 October	Imperial German Navy	Mainz		Kolberg-class cruiser		
1 October	Imperial German Navy	Nassau		Nassau-class battleship		
28 October	United States Navy	Flusser		Smith-class destroyer	DD-20	
16 November	Imperial German Navy	Westfalen		Nassau-class battleship		
23 November	United States Navy	Stingray		C-class submarine	SS-13	Renamed C-2 in 1911
23 November	United States Navy	Tarpon		C-class submarine	SS-14	Renamed C-3 in 1911
23 November	United States Navy	Bonita		C-class submarine	SS-15	Renamed C-4 in 1911
23 November	United States Navy	Narwhal		D-class submarine	SS-17	Renamed D-1 in 1911
23 November	United States Navy	Grayling		D-class submarine	SS-18	Renamed D-2 in 1911
26 November	United States Navy	Smith		Smith-class destroyer	DD-17	
3 December	United States Navy	Reid		Smith-class destroyer	DD-21	
21 December	United States Navy	Preston		Smith-class destroyer	DD-19	
