= William T. Sampson =

American admiral (1840–1902)

William Thomas Sampson
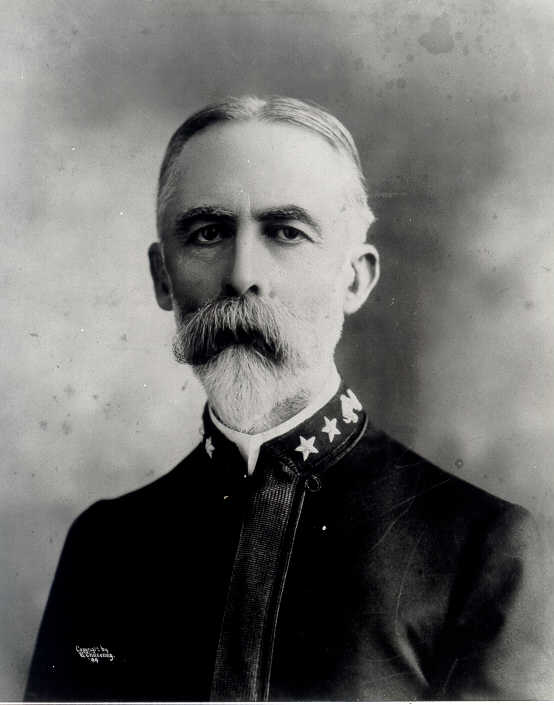
- William Thomas Sampson
- Born: February 9, 1840; Palmyra, New York, U.S.
- Died: May 6, 1902 (aged 62); Washington, D.C., U.S.
- Burial place: Arlington National Cemetery, Virginia, U.S.
- Military career
- Allegiance: United States
- Branch: United States Navy
- Service years: 1857–1902
- Rank: Rear admiral
- Commands: Alert; Mayflower; Swatara; San Francisco; Iowa; North Atlantic Station
- Conflicts: American Civil War; Blockade of the South; Sinking of USS Patapsco; Spanish–American War; Puerto Rico campaign; Bombardment of San Juan; Santiago campaign; Battle of Santiago de Cuba

William Thomas Sampson (February 9, 1840 – May 6, 1902) was a United States Navy rear admiral known for his victory in the Battle of Santiago de Cuba during the Spanish–American War.

== Biography ==
He was born in Palmyra, New York, and entered the United States Naval Academy on September 24, 1857. After graduating first in his class four years later, he served as an instructor at the academy, teaching physics. In 1864, he became the executive officer of the monitor Patapsco of the South Atlantic Blockading Squadron and engaged in sweeping torpedoes off Charleston, South Carolina. He survived the loss of that ironclad on January 15, 1865, when she struck a torpedo, exploded, and sank with a loss of 75 lives.

Following duty on the steam frigate Colorado with the European Squadron, another tour as instructor at the Naval Academy, and in the Bureau of Navigation of the Navy Department, he served in the screw sloop Congress. He then commanded the Alert, the training ship Mayflower, and the Swatara while on duty at the Naval Academy.

During the next years, he was Assistant to the Superintendent of the United States Naval Observatory, then Officer-in-Charge of the Naval Torpedo Station at Newport, Rhode Island. On September 9, 1886, he became Superintendent of the Naval Academy. He was promoted to captain on April 9, 1889, reported to the Mare Island Navy Yard to fit out the protected cruiser San Francisco, and assumed command when she was commissioned on November 15, 1889. He was detached in June 1892 to serve as Inspector of Ordnance in the Washington Navy Yard and was appointed Chief of the Bureau of Ordnance on January 28, 1893. He assumed command of the battleship Iowa on June 15, 1897. On February 17, 1898, he was made President of the Board of Inquiry to investigate the destruction of the Maine. On March 26, 1898, he assumed command of the North Atlantic Squadron, with the temporary rank of rear admiral.

=== Spanish–American War ===
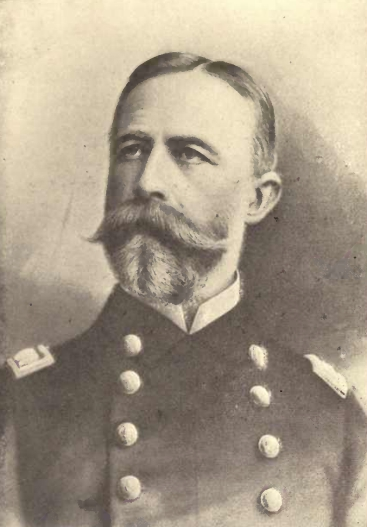
Rear Admiral William T. Sampson during the Spanish–American War

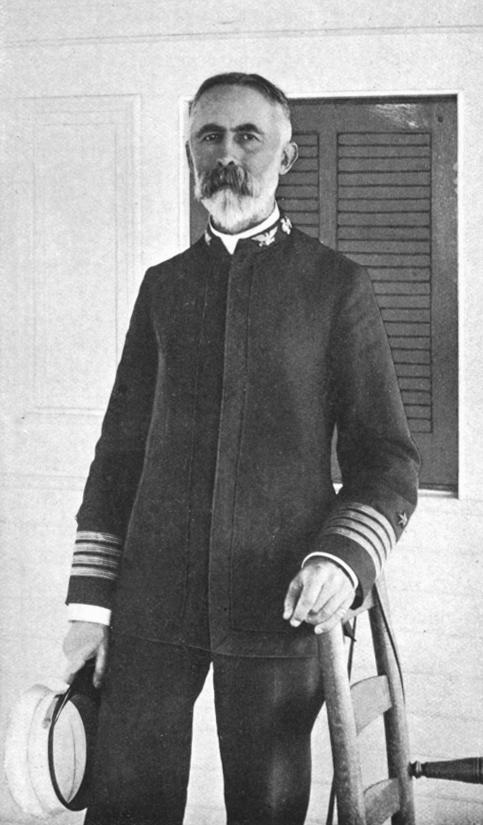
Rear Admiral William T. Sampson, from p. 73 of Cannon and Camera by John C. Hemment

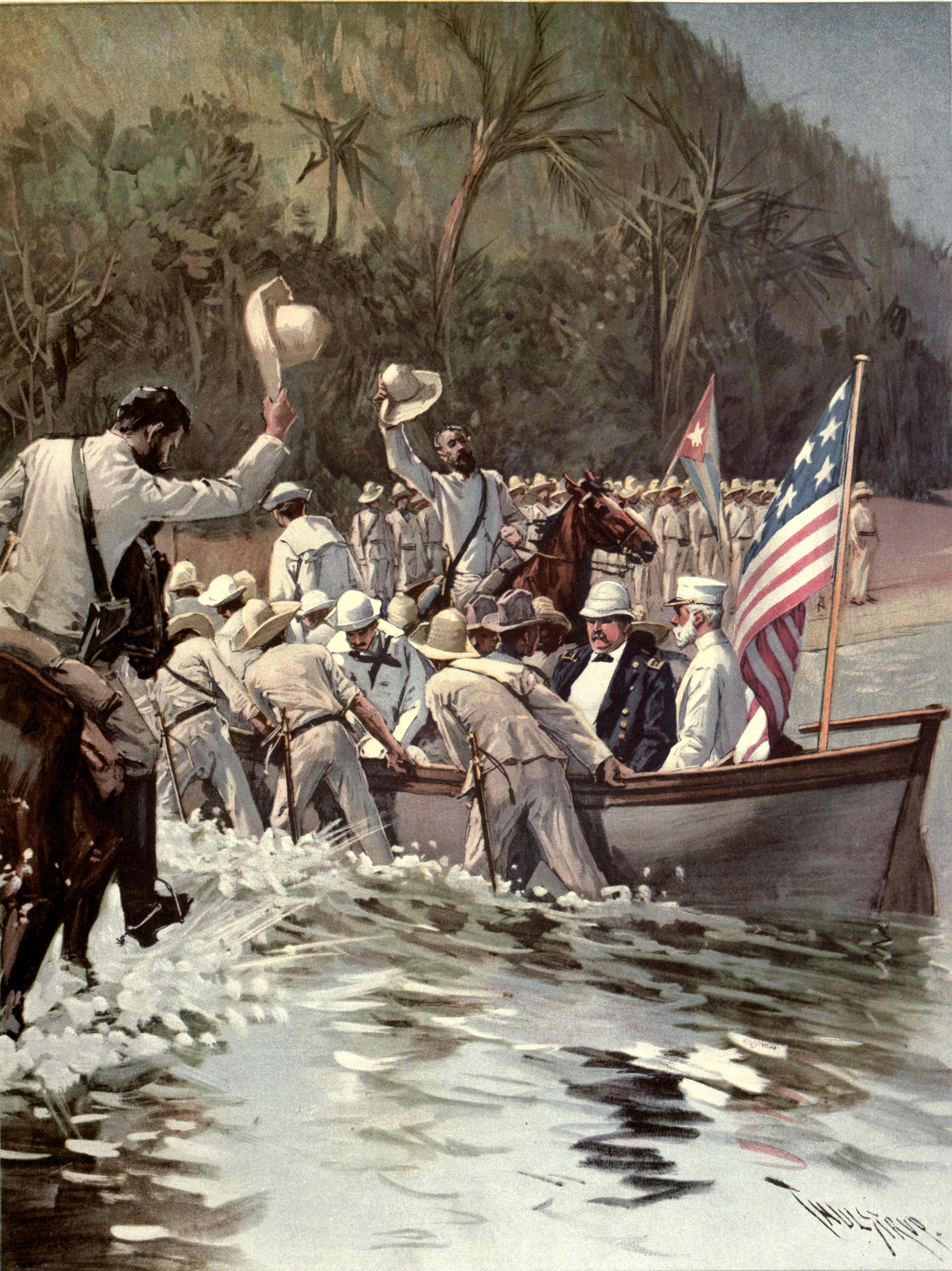
General William R. Shafter (in pith helmet) and Admiral William T. Sampson landing on the beach at Aserradero, June 20, to confer with General Calixto Garcia

The United States declared war against Spain on April 25, 1898; and, eight days later, Admiral Pascual Cervera's fleet sailed from the Cape Verde Islands for an uncertain destination. Rear Admiral Sampson, in flagship New York, put to sea from Key West. Sampson's early involvement in the conflict included his supervision of the Cuban blockade, which lasted for the duration of the war, as well as the bombardment of the city of San Juan on May 12, 1898. After initially being sent to blockade Havana itself, Sampson was given orders to intercept Admiral Cervera's squadron, but with only a vague notion of Cervera's current location, he was unable to actively pursue. Awaiting further information on Cervera's whereabouts, Sampson sailed east to San Juan and carried out a bombardment on May 12 that lasted several hours, dealing minor infrastructural damage to the city. After this preliminary bombardment, Sampson helped lead a land-sea attack on San Juan Hill, along with General William Shafter, taking the city of Santiago de Cuba. On July 1, following the successful invasion, Sampson returned to Puerto Rico, reinforcing the blockade in San Juan.

On May 29, elements of Sampson's command spotted Admiral Cervera's squadron moving into Santiago harbor and the naval presence there was greatly increased to prevent Cervera's escape. On the morning of July 3, 1898, Cervera's fleet came out of the harbor. Sampson was ashore at a conference with General Shafter, making plans for a coordinated attack on Santiago. Rear Admiral Winfield Scott Schley was in command of the Flying Squadron in Sampson's absence and met the Spanish fleet, completely destroying every Spanish vessel in a running sea battle lasting five hours. The next day, Rear Admiral Sampson sent his famous message: "The Fleet under my command offers the nation as a Fourth of July present, the whole of Cervera's Fleet".

Sampson's message omitted any mention of Schley's leadership in the battle, leading to a controversy as to who was responsible for the victory. While Sampson also arguably played a significant role in the victory, having laid down the strategic framework and determining the favorable positions of his own forces, it was of course Schley who had actually commanded the fleet during the battle. Schley appealed for a court of inquiry, which he got in 1901. In the Navy, the quarrel was so divisive that the rank-and-file identified themselves as either a "Schley man" or a "Sampson man." The court of inquiry heard testimony in support of Schley by his own men and, despite some criticism of Schley, exonerated the commander of the Flying Squadron.

After the Battle of Santiago Bay, Sampson was appointed Cuban Commissioner on August 20, 1898, but resumed command of the North Atlantic Fleet in December. He became Commandant of the Boston Navy Yard in October 1899 and transferred to the Retired List on February 9, 1902.

=== Charles Morgan Promotion ===
In February 1901, naval gunner Charles Morgan made a request for promotion to naval ensign. Admiral Sampson sent a note to the U.S. Navy Department stating that although Morgan had the professional and technical abilities for promotion, he lacked the "social advantages" necessary for promotion. Sampson's comments were upbraided in the U.S. Senate by Senator William V. Allen of Nebraska, who referred to Sampson as a "conceited ass" and endorsing a "snobbish aristocracy".

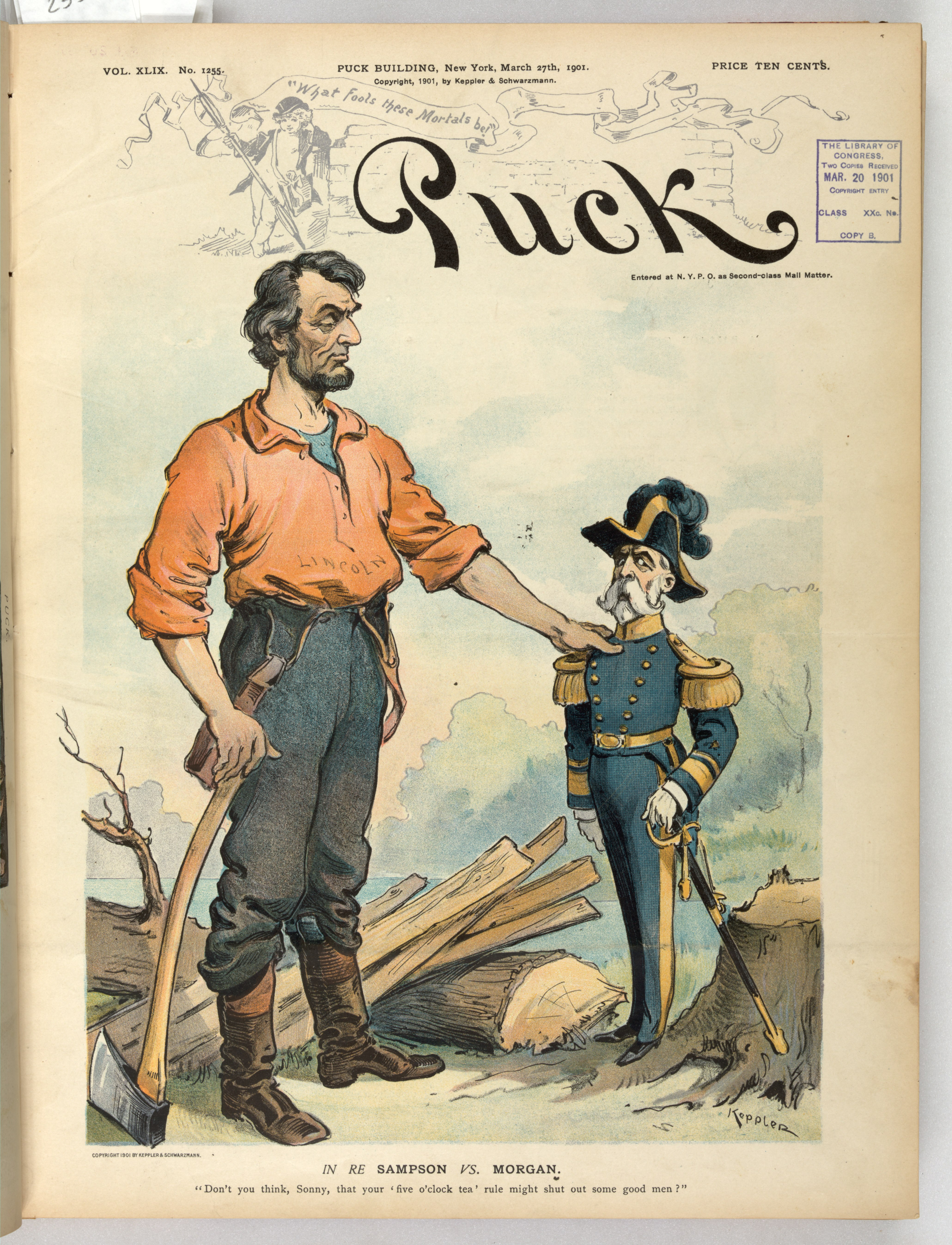
An oversized Abraham Lincoln, holding an ax, addresses a diminutive Rear Admiral William T. Sampson regarding the case of Gunner Charles Morgan’s efforts toward advancement in rank in the U.S. Navy. Caption: “Don’t you think, Sonny, that your ‘five o’clock tea’ rule might shut out some good men?”

=== Later Life & Death ===
Sampson was a companion of the Military Order of the Loyal Legion of the United States and the Military Order of Foreign Wars. He was awarded an honorary doctorate (LL.D.) by Yale University in October 1901, during celebrations for the bicentenary of the university. Having retired from the Navy, Sampson died of severe cerebral hemorrhage on May 6, 1902.

== Awards ==
- Civil War Campaign Medal
- Sampson Medal
- Spanish Campaign Medal

== Dates of rank ==
- Acting Midshipman – September 24, 1857
- Midshipman – June 1, 1861
- Lieutenant – July 16, 1862
- Lieutenant Commander – July 25, 1866
- Commander – August 9, 1874
- Captain – March 26, 1889
- Temporary Rear Admiral – March 26, 1898
- Commodore – July 3, 1898
- Rear Admiral – March 3, 1899
- Retired List – February 9, 1902

== Namesakes ==
- Four destroyers of the Navy have been named USS Sampson in his honor.
- The United States Naval Academy's Sampson Hall, which houses the English and History departments, is named in his honor.
- The United States Navy also authorized a service medal, officially named the West Indies Naval Campaign Medal but better known as the Sampson Medal, to recognize those who had served under his command during the Spanish–American War. The obverse of the medal bears Sampson's image and, thus, Sampson was one of only four Americans in history entitled to wear an official medal with their own image on it. (The others were Admiral George Dewey, General John J. Pershing and Admiral Richard E. Byrd.)
- The former Sampson Naval Training Base, that became the Sampson Air Force Base and is now a New York State Park on the eastern shore of Seneca Lake were named in his honor. Approved by President Roosevelt in 1942, 498 buildings were constructed on 2,500 acres (10 km^{2}) of farmland in the Finger Lakes near Palmyra, New York by 15,500 workers in 270 days so that 411,000 sailors could be trained before the facility closed in 1946. The facility was converted to the Sampson Air Force Base for the Korean War and between 1950 and 1956 over 300,000 airmen had their basic training there. Even though the facility is now the Sampson State Park, known for its herd of white deer, it has returned to military duty now that the Sampson Veterans Memorial Cemetery has been completed.
- A Brooklyn, New York elementary school, PS 160, was named in his honor.
- The steamship SS Admiral Sampson was named in his honor. It was built in 1898 and sank in Puget Sound in 1914.
- W.T. Sampson Elementary/High School at Naval Station Guantanamo Bay is named in his honor.
- Detroit Public Schools has a school that bears the name William T. Sampson Elementary School, located at 6075 Begole Street, Detroit, MI 48210. It is no longer used and has been shuttered.
- The Wisconsin town of Sampson is named in his honor.

== Personal life ==
In 1863, Sampson married Margaret Sexton Aldrich (1842–1878). On January 16, 1878, Sampson's first wife Margaret died.

In 1882, Sampson married Elizabeth Susan Burling.

In 1916, Sampson's daughter Margaret Aldrich Smith became the First Lady of Guam until 1918.

Sampson's granddaughter Marjorie Sampson Smith became a sponsor of USS Sampson on March 4, 1916.

Admiral Sampson died of a cerebral hemorrhage on May 6, 1902, in Washington, D.C., and is buried in Arlington National Cemetery.

== See also ==
- List of superintendents of the United States Naval Academy
- Puerto Rico campaign

Academic offices
Preceded by Francis M. Ramsay	Superintendent of United States Naval Academy; 1886–1890	Succeeded by Robert L. Phythian
Military offices
Preceded by Montgomery Sicard	Commander-in-Chief, North Atlantic Squadron; March 28, 1898 – October 1899	Succeeded by Norman H. Farquhar
