= USS Sampson =

Four ships in the United States Navy have been named USS Sampson for Rear Admiral William T. Sampson (1840–1902), known for his victory in the Battle of Santiago de Cuba during the Spanish–American War.

- USS Sampson (DD-63) was the lead ship of her class of destroyers, commissioned in 1916, served in World War I and decommissioned in 1921.
- USS Sampson (DD-394) was a Somers-class destroyer, commissioned in 1938, served in World War II, and decommissioned in 1946.
- USS Sampson (DDG-10) was a Charles F. Adams-class guided missile destroyer, commissioned in 1961 and decommissioned in 1991.
- USS Sampson (DDG-102) is an Arleigh Burke-class guided missile destroyer. She was commissioned in 2007.
