= D-class submarine =

D-class submarine may refer to:

- British D-class submarine
- Spanish D-class submarine
- United States D-class submarine
- Japanese Type D submarine, two classes submarines
  - I-361-class submarine (Type D1 submarine)
  - I-373-class submarine (Type D2 submarine)
