= E-class submarine =

Two classes of submarine are known as the E class:

- The British E-class submarine of 58 submarines of the Royal Navy, built between 1912 and 1916 that served in World War I
- The United States E-class submarine of 2 submarines of the United States Navy
