= USS Wilkes (DD-67) =

Sampson-class destroyer

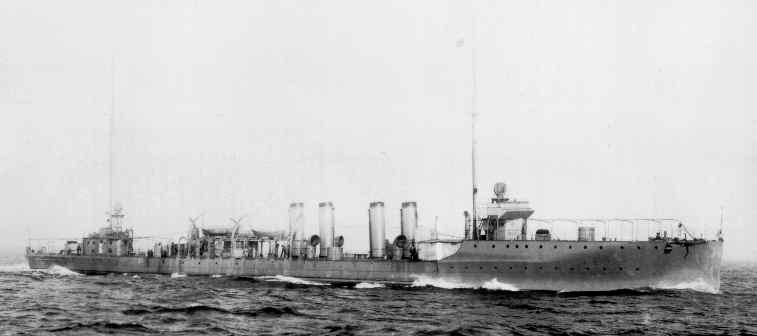
- USS Wilkes (DD-67)

History

United States
- Name: USS Wilkes (DD-67)
- Builder: William Cramp & Sons, Philadelphia
- Yard number: 422
- Laid down: 11 March 1915
- Launched: 18 May 1916
- Commissioned: 10 November 1916
- Decommissioned: 5 June 1922
- Stricken: 5 July 1934
- Reinstated: 29 March 1934
- Fate: Transferred to Coast Guard 1926; Transfer back to the USN 29 March 1934. Sold on 22 August 1934 for scrapping.

United States
- Commissioned: 23 August 1926
- Decommissioned: 29 March 1934
- Fate: Transferred back to the USN 29 March 1934
- Notes: USCG number CG-25

General characteristics
- Class & type: Sampson-class destroyer
- Displacement: 1,111 tons (normal), 1,225 tons (full load)
- Length: 315 ft 3 in (96.1 m)
- Beam: 30 ft 7 in (9.3 m)
- Draft: 10 ft 9 in (3.3 m)
- Propulsion: 4 Boilers; 2 Curtis Turbines: 17,696 horsepower
- Speed: 29.5 knots (55 km/h)
- Complement: 99 officers and crew
- Armament: 4 × 4-inch (100 mm)/50 guns; 2 × 1-pounder (37 mm) AA guns; 12 × 21 inch (533 mm) torpedo tubes (4 × 3)

USS Wilkes (DD-67) was a Sampson-class destroyer in the United States Navy during World War I. She was the second Navy ship named for Commodore Charles Wilkes (1798–1877). She served with the United States Coast Guard as (CG-25).

== Construction and commissioning ==
Wilkes was laid down on 11 March 1915 at Philadelphia by the William Cramp & Sons Ship & Engine Building Co., launched on 18 May 1916, sponsored by Miss Carrie McIver Wilkes; and commissioned on 10 November 1916.

== Service history ==
=== World War I ===
Wilkes spent the winter preceding America's entry into World War I outfitting—first in the Philadelphia Navy Yard and later in the Torpedo Station located at Newport, R.I.—and conducting fleet maneuvers in Cuban waters. She returned from those operations at the height of the crisis over the German declaration of unrestricted submarine warfare, arriving in Norfolk on 7 March 1917. Just one month later, on 6 April, the United States joined the war against the Central Powers. At the end of April, the destroyer escorted the French cruiser Amiral Aube from Norfolk to New York. On 15 June, she departed New York in the screen of the first American troop convoy to voyage to Europe. She escorted her charges into Saint Nazaire on 26 June then headed for Portsmouth, England, where she celebrated Independence Day. From there, she continued on to her permanent European base, Queenstown, Ireland, where she arrived on the 6th.

Wilkes operated from the Queenstown base for the duration of World War I. For the most part, she conducted antisubmarine patrols and escorted convoys bound for England on the last leg of their voyage. Occasionally, however, she was called upon to shepherd convoys into port at Brest and Saint Nazaire, France. Although her duties appeared routine, they were strenuous. She spent many arduous days at sea in the stormy Atlantic with only hours or, at most, a day or two in port to provision. Though it appears that she never saw combat with German U-boats, she did witness the results of their depredations once when she rescued 23 survivors of the torpedoed British merchantman SS Purley on 25 July 1917. She continued her patrol and escort duties until after Christmas 1918, over a month after the cessation of hostilities. On 26 December, she departed Queenstown and headed for home. On 7 January 1919, she arrived in New York.

Immediately upon her return, Wilkes began overhaul at New York. That occupied her time until 1 May when the destroyer embarked upon her most noteworthy postwar mission—duty as a picket ship for the first transatlantic flight. Only one of the four Navy-Curtiss (NC) flying boats slated for the mission actually completed the flight. NC-4 reached the Azores at Horta on 17 May, made the hop to Ponta Delgada on the 20th, and departed the Azores for Lisbon, Portugal, on the 27th. Wilkes served as a picket on that second leg of the flight as the fourth ship in a line of 14 destroyers between the Azores and the European continent. The NC-4 reached her destination that same day, and Wilkes' part in the event was completed. While NC-4 finished the third and last leg of its flight—from Lisbon to Plymouth, England—on 30 and 31 May, Wilkes pointed her bow homeward. The destroyer reentered New York harbor on 4 June and resumed peacetime operations along the Atlantic coast. For the next 34 months, she plied the waters off the eastern seaboard in the spring, summer, and fall. Late each fall, she headed south to participate in fleet maneuvers in Cuban waters, the Caribbean, and the Gulf of Mexico. During that time, she was based at three different ports—Newport, R.I.; New York, N.Y.; and Charleston, S.C. On 12 April 1922, Wilkes entered the Philadelphia Navy Yard where she was placed out of commission on 5 June 1922.

=== United States Coast Guard ===
Wilkes remained inactive at Philadelphia for over four years. In the summer of 1926, she was turned over to the Coast Guard, desperately in need of additional ships to suppress smuggling of alcoholic beverages in response to their Prohibition in the United States. She was commissioned a Coast Guard destroyer at New London, Connecticut, on 23 August 1926. For the next eight years, she patrolled the east coast from New England to Florida. In 1934, the repeal of Prohibition brought an end to alcohol smuggling and the "Rum Patrol".

Wilkes completed her last Coast Guard patrol at Philadelphia on 15 March 1934. There, she was placed out of commission on 29 March and returned to the Navy. On 5 July 1934, her name was struck from the Navy list. She was sold on 22 August 1934 for scrapping under the terms of the London Treaty for the limitation of naval armaments.

== Honors and awards ==
- World War I Victory Medal with DESTROYER Clasp
