= William R. Purnell =

American officer (1886–1955)

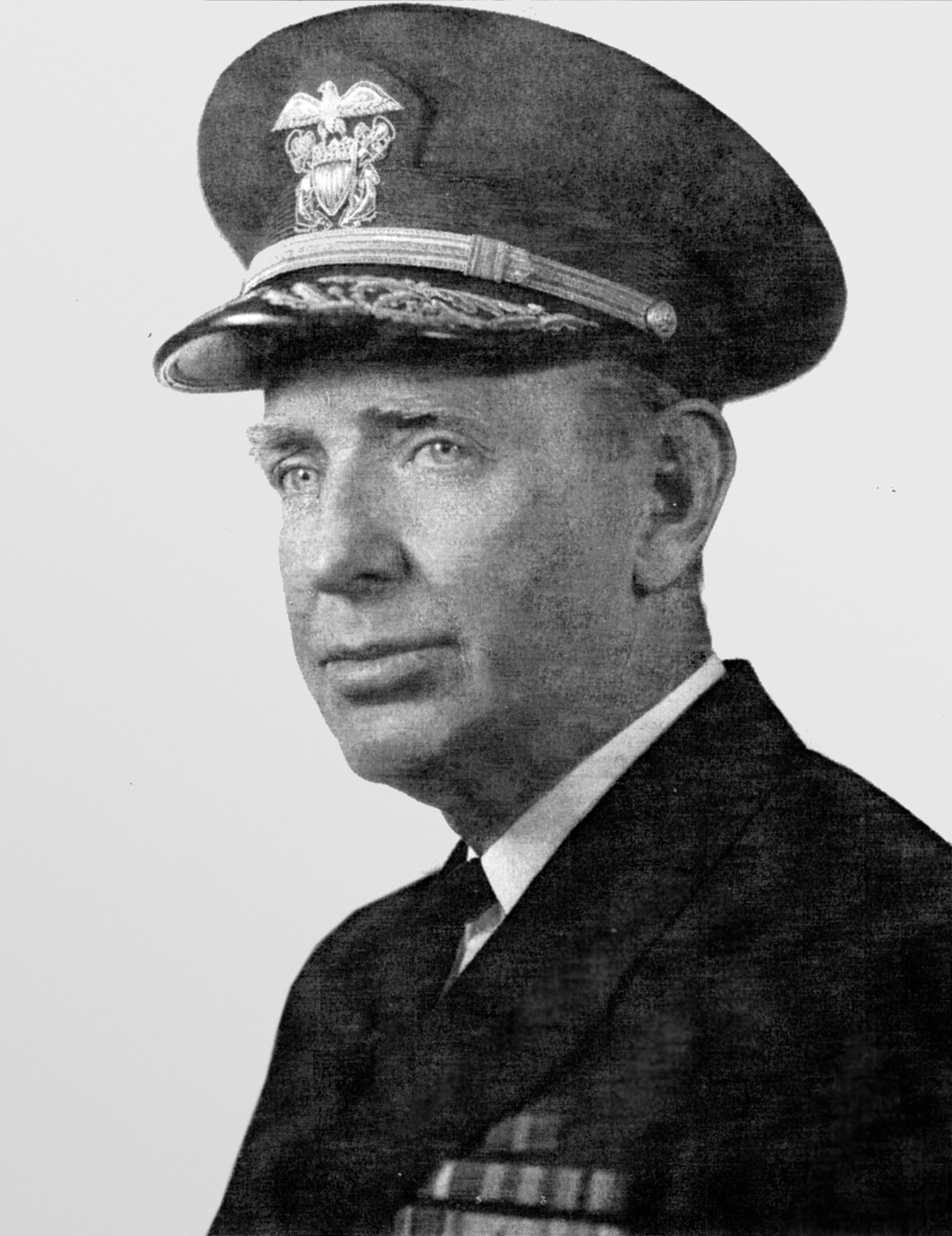
- Rear Admiral William R. Purnell
- Born: 6 September 1886; Bowling Green, Missouri, U.S.
- Died: 5 March 1955 (aged 68); Palo Alto, California, U.S.
- Burial place: Golden Gate National Cemetery
- Alma mater: United States Naval Academy (BS)
- Military career
- Allegiance: United States
- Branch: United States Navy
- Service years: 1910–1946
- Rank: Rear Admiral
- Commands: USS New Orleans; USS Rowan; USS Lamson; USS Patterson
- Conflicts: World War I World War II
- Awards: Navy Cross; Navy Distinguished Service Medal (2)

Rear Admiral William Reynolds Purnell (6 September 1886 – 3 March 1955) was an officer in the United States Navy who served in World War I and World War II. A 1908 graduate of the United States Naval Academy, he captained destroyers during World War I. He was awarded the Navy Cross for his role in protecting convoys against German submarines as commander of the USS Lamson.

He was promoted to rear admiral in November 1941. During World War II, he was chief of staff of the ill-fated Asiatic Fleet at the start of the Pacific War. He later served as Assistant Chief of Naval Operations for Materiel. He was the navy representative on the Joint Committee on New Weapons and Equipment, and, from September 1942, the navy representative on the Military Policy Committee, the three-man committee that oversaw the Manhattan Project. Purnell helped coordinate its activities with those of the navy. In 1945, he travelled to Tinian as the representative of the Military Policy Committee, and coordinated preparations for the atomic bombing of Hiroshima and Nagasaki with senior army and navy commanders in the Pacific. He retired from the navy in 1946 and died in 1955.

== Early life ==
William Reynolds Purnell was born in Bowling Green, Missouri, on 6 September 1886. In 1908, he graduated from the United States Naval Academy at Annapolis. He was commissioned as an ensign in 1910. During World War I, he commanded the destroyers USS Lamson, USS Patterson, USS Rowan, and USS Montgomery. For his services, he was awarded the Navy Cross. His citation read:

The President of the United States of America takes pleasure in presenting the Navy Cross to Lieutenant Commander William Reynolds Purnell, United States Navy, for distinguished service in the line of his profession as commanding officer of the USS Lamson, engaged in the important, exacting and hazardous duty of patrolling the waters infested with enemy submarines and mines, in escorting and protecting vitally important convoys of troops and supplies through these waters, and in offensive and defensive action, vigorously and unremittingly prosecuted against all forms of enemy naval activity during World War I.

In January 1917, while he was serving on the Rowan, he married Ada Dodge Curtiss, the daughter of Walter Phelps Dodge and the ex-wife of Gerald S. Curtiss. They had one son, William Reynolds Purnell, Jr.

After the war, he commanded the tanker USS Cuyama from 1934 to 1936. Alternating duty afloat with service ashore, he then became secretary to the General Board. He commanded the cruiser USS New Orleans from January to December 1939.

== World War II ==
Purnell became Chief of Staff of Admiral Thomas C. Hart's Asiatic Fleet. Purnell represented the United States at a planning conference in Singapore in April 1941 at which American, British, Dutch, Australian, and New Zealand commanders attempted to coordinate their plans for an increasingly likely war with Japan. He was promoted to rear admiral in November 1941. On 7 December, Purnell played golf with Hart. War broke out the next morning. The Japanese advanced quickly and the Asiatic Fleet moved from the Philippines to Java in January. As the Japanese closed in on Java, Purnell flew to Broome on 25 February.

In Australia, Purnell became chief of staff to Vice Admiral William A. Glassford, the commander of US Naval Forces, Southwest Pacific. When Glassford departed in May 1942, Purnell took his place. He too left Australia in June 1942, for duty in Washington, D.C., in the Office of the Commander in Chief, United States Fleet, Admiral Ernest J. King. For his services, he was awarded the Navy Distinguished Service Medal. His citation read:

The President of the United States of America, authorized by Act of Congress, July 9, 1918, takes pleasure in presenting the Navy Distinguished Service Medal to Rear Admiral William Reynolds Purnell, United States Navy, for especially meritorious service as Chief of Staff to Commander in Chief, Asiatic Fleet, and Commander U.S. Forces, Southwest, Pacific, since the outbreak of war for duties involving great responsibility connected with formulation plans, counseling their application and aid in directing execution, especially of offensive missions of forces of this command which have resulted in substantial damage to the enemy together with skill and tact displayed in negotiating, conferring and dealing with commanders of the Allied Forces during World War II.

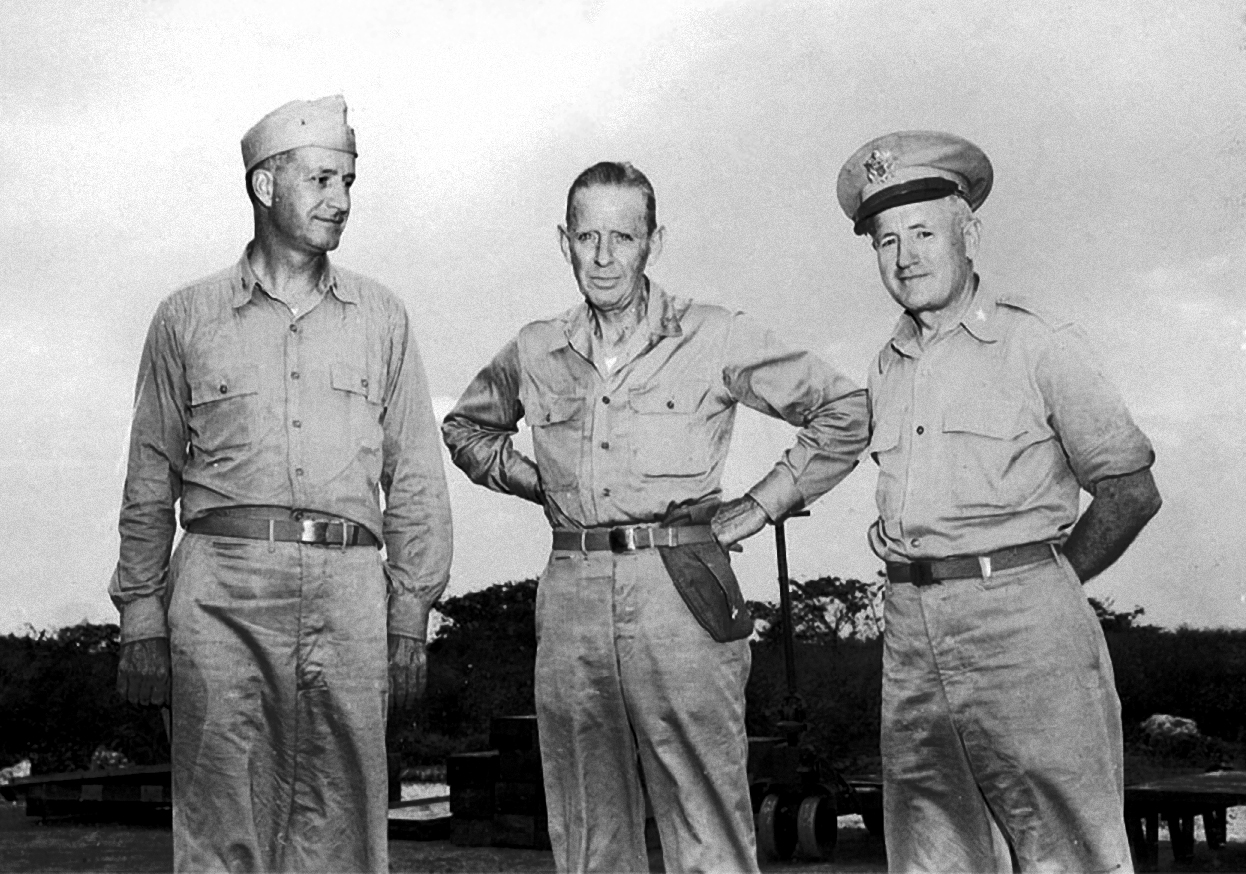
The "Tinian Joint Chiefs": Captain William S. Parsons (left), Rear Admiral William R. Purnell (center), and Brigadier General Thomas F. Farrell (right)

Purnell became Deputy Chief of Naval Operations for Materiel. He was also the navy representative on the Joint Committee on New Weapons and Equipment, and, from September 1942, the navy representative on the Military Policy Committee, the three-man committee that oversaw the Manhattan Project. Purnell helped coordinate the activities of the Manhattan Project with those of the navy, particularly the navy's thermal diffusion research, and he helped provide scientists and technicians from the navy for the project.

In February 1945, Purnell arranged for Commander Frederick Ashworth to go to Guam to brief Fleet Admiral Chester Nimitz on the project. He provided Ashworth with a letter from King stressing the project's importance and the need for secrecy. Ashworth selected a base site for the Manhattan Project's operations. He inspected facilities on Guam and Tinian, and chose the latter.

Tinian's harbor suffered from congestion due to extensive base development work, and ships sometimes took months to unload. The director of the Manhattan Project, Major General Leslie R. Groves, Jr., went to Purnell, who arranged for an order from King to Nimitz stating that all shipments related to the Manhattan Project and the 509th Composite Group had to be unloaded immediately on arrival, regardless of the consequent disruption to the port's operations.

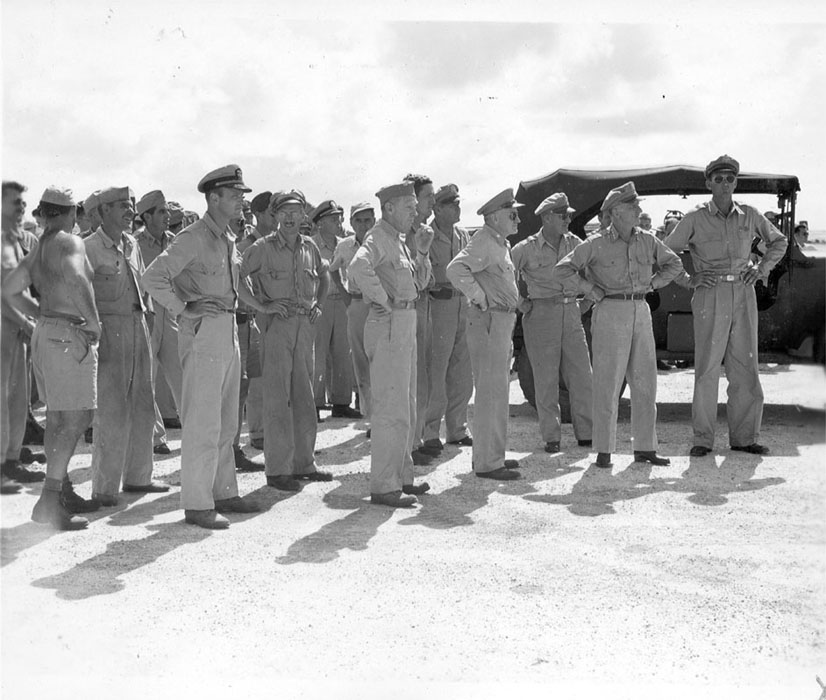
Purnell (center), General Carl Spaatz (second from right) and other dignitaries await the return of the Enola Gay and her crew from the mission to Hiroshima

Problems like this underlined the value of having high-ranking officers on hand to deal with local commanders to make decisions on the spot if necessary. In drawing up an organization for command of the Manhattan Project's operations, Groves and Purnell agreed that Purnell should to be present on Tinian as both the representative of the Military Policy Committee and the personal representative of Admiral King. He was joined by Brigadier General Thomas F. Farrell, the Manhattan Project's Deputy for Operations, and the two shared responsibility for coordinating the Manhattan Project's activities with the senior army and navy commanders in the Pacific. Along with Captain William S. Parsons, the director of Project Alberta, they formed what became informally known as the "Tinian Joint Chiefs".

Purnell was the first proponent of the idea that two atomic attacks, one following quickly after the other, would be required to end the war. This was something that Groves and Purnell discussed a number of times. "I knew that with him and Farrell on the ground at Tinian," Groves wrote. "There would be no unnecessary delay in exploiting our success" after the bombing of Hiroshima. The main difficulty with the second mission, then scheduled for 11 August, was the weather, which was predicted to be good until 9 August but bad for at least five days starting on 10 August. Parsons agreed to work the assembly team around the clock to get the Fat Man bomb ready by the evening of 8 August.

Before Major Charles Sweeney took off on the mission, Purnell took him aside and asked him if he knew how much the bomb cost. Sweeney did not know; Purnell told him it was about $2 billion. He then asked if Sweeney knew how much his aircraft was worth. This Sweeney did know; over half a million dollars. Purnell then told him: "I'd suggest you keep those relative values in mind for this mission."

== Later life ==
After the war, Purnell served as a member of the Army-Navy Evaluation Board during Operation Crossroads. He retired from the navy in October 1946, and moved to Palo Alto, California, where he died on 5 March 1955. He was buried in Golden Gate National Cemetery. He was survived by his wife, Ada Dodge Purnell, and his son, William R. Purnell, Jr.
