= USS Rowan (DD-64) =

Sampson-class destroyer

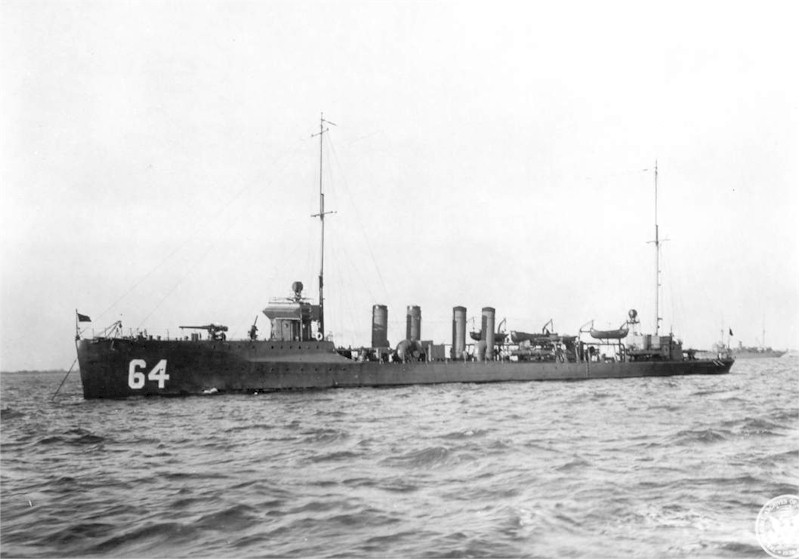
- USS Rowan (DD-64)

History

United States
- Name: USS Rowan (DD-64)
- Namesake: Named for Vice Admiral Stephen C. Rowan (1805-1890).
- Laid down: 10 May 1915
- Launched: 23 March 1916
- Commissioned: 22 August 1916
- Decommissioned: 19 June 1922
- Stricken: 7 January 1936
- Fate: Sold for scrap 20 April 1939

General characteristics
- Class & type: Sampson-class destroyer
- Displacement: 1,111 tons (normal), 1,225 tons (full load)
- Length: 315 ft 3 in (96.1 m)
- Beam: 30 ft 7 in (9.3 m)
- Draft: 10 ft 9 in (3.3 m)
- Propulsion: 4 Boilers; 2 Curtis Turbines: 17,696 horsepower
- Speed: 29.5 knots (55 km/h)
- Complement: 99 officers and crew
- Armament: 4 × 4-inch (100 mm)/50 guns; 2 × 1-pounder (37 mm) AA guns; 12 × 21 inch (533 mm) torpedo tubes (4 × 3)

USS Rowan (DD-64) was a Sampson-class destroyer of the United States Navy. She was the second Navy ship named for Vice Admiral Stephen C. Rowan (1805–1890).

== Construction and commissioning ==
Rowan was laid down on 10 May 1915 by the Fore River Shipbuilding Company, Quincy, Massachusetts; launched 23 March 1916, sponsored by Miss Louise McL. Ayres, great-niece of Admiral Rowan; and commissioned at Boston, Massachusetts, on 22 August 1916, Lieutenant William R. Purnell in command.

== Service history ==
=== World War I ===
Following shakedown, Rowan, based at Newport, Rhode Island, operated along the Atlantic coast during the fall of 1916, then participated in winter exercises in the Caribbean and the Gulf of Mexico. At Norfolk, Virginia, when the United States entered World War I, she patrolled off the mouth of the York River, and then repaired at New York. On 7 May 1917, she departed Boston for Ireland, arriving with Division 7 at Queenstown on the 27th.

From then, through the remainder of the war, Rowan conducted antisubmarine patrols and escorted convoys to both British and French ports. On 28 May 1918, she joined two other destroyers in attacking a U-boat; dropped 14 depth charges; and had the satisfaction of watching oil cover the surface in the attack area.

Rowan departed Queenstown on 26 December 1918 and reached New York on 8 January 1919. Into the summer, she conducted exercises along the east coast and in the Caribbean. On 29 August, she entered the Philadelphia Navy Yard and was placed in reduced commission.

Designated DD-64 the following summer, 1920, Rowan resumed operations with the Atlantic Fleet in March 1921 and continued them until March 1922. She then returned to Philadelphia where she was decommissioned on 19 June 1922. She remained inactive, laid up at League Island, until struck from the Navy list on 7 January 1936. Her hulk was sold for scrap on 20 April 1939.
