= United States E-class submarine =

United States Navy submarine class

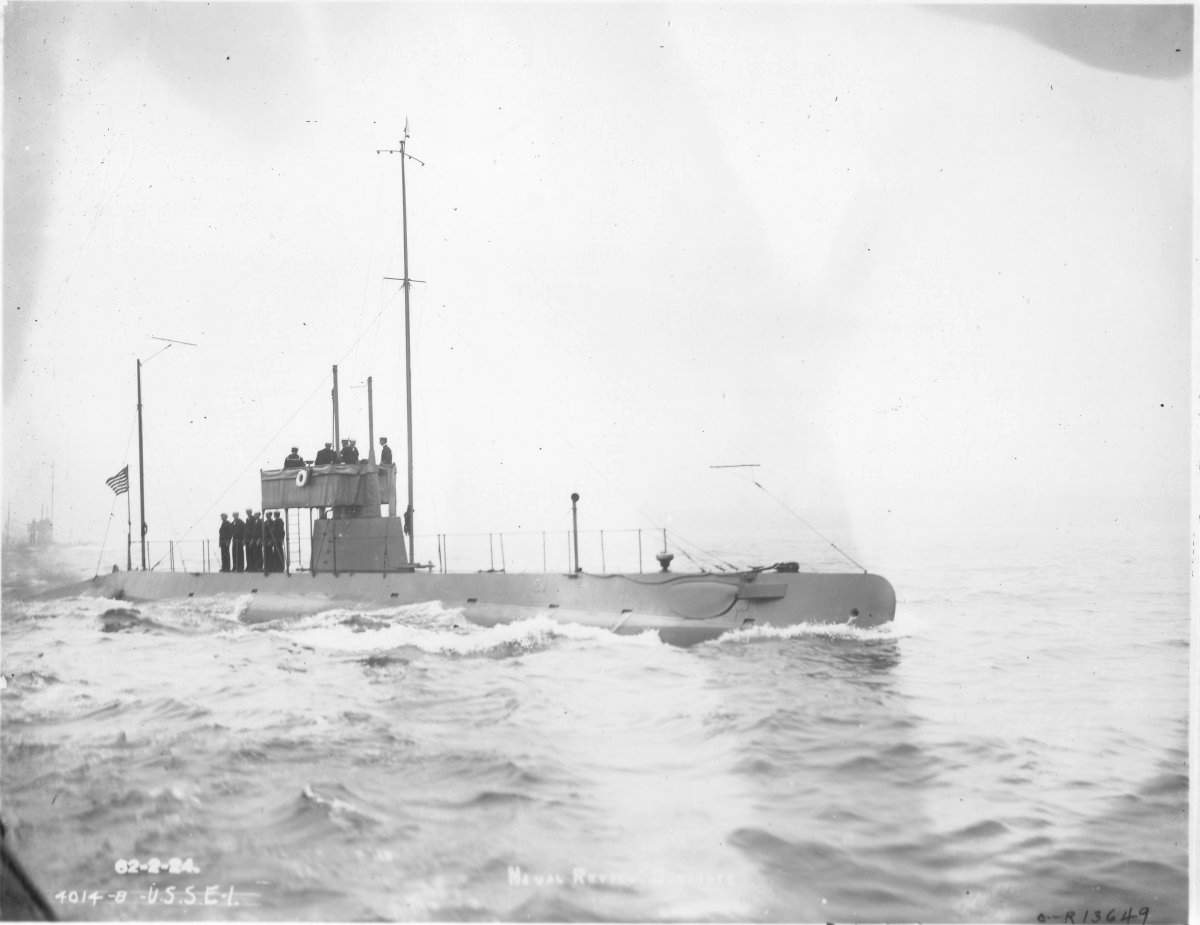
- USS E-1, ex-Skipjack, lead ship of the class, underway, starboard side view, at the Naval Review at New York City, 4 October 1912

Class overview
- Name: E class
- Builders: Electric Boat (design); Fore River Shipbuilding Company, Quincy, Massachusetts
- Operators: United States Navy
- Preceded by: D class
- Succeeded by: F class
- Built: 1911–1912
- In commission: 1912–1921
- Completed: 2
- Retired: 2

General characteristics
- Type: Submarine
- Displacement: 287 long tons (292 t) surfaced; 342 long tons (347 t) submerged
- Length: 135 ft 3 in (41.22 m)
- Beam: 14 ft 7 in (4.45 m)
- Draft: 11 ft 8 in (3.56 m)
- Installed power: 700 hp (522 kW) (diesel); 600 hp (447 kW) (electric)
- Propulsion: 2 × NELSECO diesel engines; 2 × Electro Dynamic electric motors; 2 × 60-cell batteries; 2 × Propellers
- Speed: 13.5 kn (25.0 km/h; 15.5 mph) surfaced; 11.5 kn (21.3 km/h; 13.2 mph) submerged
- Range: 2,100 nmi (3,900 km; 2,400 mi) at 11 kn (20 km/h; 13 mph) surfaced; 100 nmi (190 km; 120 mi) at 5 kn (9.3 km/h; 5.8 mph) submerged
- Test depth: 200 ft (61 m)
- Capacity: 8,486 US gal (32,120 L; 7,066 imp gal) fuel
- Complement: 1 officer; 19 enlisted
- Armament: 4 × 18 inch (450 mm) bow torpedo tubes (4 torpedoes)

The E-class submarines were a class of two United States Navy submarines, built by the Fore River Shipbuilding Company of Quincy, Massachusetts, under a subcontract from the Electric Boat Company. They were used as coastal and harbor defense submarines prior to World War I. When hostilities broke out, the E class were mostly used as training boats; however, E-1 operated on war patrols based in the Azores. During this time, the need for an improved permanent bridge structure was discovered; the temporary piping-and-canvas bridges were inadequate in the North Atlantic.

== Design ==
The two E-class submarines were analogous to the preceding D-class submarine, with very similar size and displacement and the same armament. They were essentially diesel powered D-class boats, and were the first US diesel-powered submarines. The French submarine Z (Q 36), was the first in the world, in 1905. Although early diesels were unreliable and the E class engines were replaced in 1915, diesels rapidly supplanted gasoline-fueled engines aboard submarines worldwide, to eliminate the substantial risk of gasoline fumes settling into the bilges of the boat at explosive concentrations.

Submerged controllability problems associated with the ever increasing size of USN submarines led the force to adopt bow diving planes for the first time in this class. The bow planes were for precision depth control, while the traditional set of stern diving planes handled angle control. D-2, of the previous class, tested a prototype set of bow planes and the tests were entirely successful. A larger and retractable set was installed on the E-class, setting the standard that lasted until the Skipjack-class nuclear submarines of the late 1950s.

The small conning tower fairwater, also known as a sail, initially precluded any sort of bridge structure for surface cruising. For extended surface runs, a temporary piping-and-canvas structure was erected to give the topside watchstanders some protection from the elements. The considerable time required to dismantle that structure made crash diving the boat impossible, but that was not seen as an impediment as USN doctrine did not call for crash dives at that time. Experience in World War I showed that the piping-and-canvas structure was inadequate in North Atlantic weather, and USN submarines serving overseas in that war (E, K, and L-classes) had the forward structure of the fairwater modified with a metal "chariot" shield. Starting in 1918-1919, using lessons learned from overseas experience, US submarines had bridges more suited to surfaced operations in rough weather. By 1920, even E-2 had been retrofitted with a permanent metal chariot bridge structure.

== History ==
The E-class, and similar early submarines, were known as "pig boats" due to foul living quarters and unusual hull shape. The E class was used to test and evaluate tactics and new equipment, but was quickly overtaken by newer long-range, ocean-going submarines. E-1 was forward deployed to the Azores, in World War I, the oldest and smallest US submarine to perform war patrols in that war. The class was decommissioned and scrapped in 1922, to comply with the Washington Naval Treaty.

== Boats in class ==
The following ships of the class were constructed.

Construction data
Ship name	Hull class and no.	Builder	Laid down	Launched	Comm.	Decomm.	Renamed	Rename date	Reclass. hull no.	Reclass. hull no. date	Fate
Skipjack	Submarine No. 24	Fore River Shipyard, Quincy, Massachusetts	22 December 1909	27 May 1911	14 February 1912	20 October 1921	E-1	17 November 1911	SS-24	17 July 1920	Sold for scrapping, 19 April 1922
Sturgeon	Submarine No. 25	Fore River Shipyard, Quincy, Massachusetts	22 December 1909	16 June 1911	14 February 1912	20 October 1921	E-2	17 November 1911	SS-25	17 July 1920	Sold for scrapping, 19 April 1922

== Bibliography ==
- Hedman, Ric; Johnston, David (8 May 2025). "Submarine Specifications".
- Hedman, Ric; Johnston, David (8 May 2025a). "E-class".
- Hedman, Ric; Johnston, David (8 May 2025b). "E-class photos".
- Friedman, Norman (1995). US Submarines through 1945: An Illustrated Design History. Annapolis: Naval Institute Press. ISBN 1-55750-263-3.
- Gardiner, Robert (1985). Conway's All the World's Fighting Ships 1906–1921. Conway Maritime Press. ISBN 0-85177-245-5.
- Pike, John (27 April 2005). "SS-24 E-1 Skipjack". globalsecurity.org.
- Priolo, Gary. "Skipjack / E-1 (SS-24)". NavSource.
- Priolo, Gary. "Sturgeon / E-2 (SS-25)". NavSource.
