= George C. Day =

United States Navy admiral

George Calvin Day
- Born: November 8, 1871; Bradford, Vermont, US
- Died: November 3, 1940 (aged 68); Washington, D.C., US
- Burial place: Arlington National Cemetery
- Military career
- Allegiance: United States
- Branch: United States Navy
- Service years: 1892–1935
- Rank: Rear Admiral
- Commands: USS Preston; Division 7, Torpedo Squadron, Atlantic Fleet; USS Brooklyn; USS America; USS Montana; USS Pennsylvania; Submarines, Pacific Fleet; 15th Naval District; Light Cruiser Division 2 Light Cruiser Division 3
- Conflicts: Spanish–American War; Philippine–American War; Boxer Rebellion; Mexican Revolution; World War I
- Awards: Navy Cross

George Calvin Day (November 8, 1871 – November 3, 1940) was a rear admiral of the United States Navy, whose career lasted from the 1890s until the mid-1930s.

== Biography ==
Born in Bradford, Vermont, the son of Hezron George Day, on 8 November 1871, he was appointed to the United States Naval Academy on 19 May 1888 by Congressman William W. Grout. Day graduated from the Naval Academy on 3 June 1892, was promoted to Ensign on 1 July 1894, Lieutenant (junior grade) on 3 March 1899, and Lieutenant in 1901. He served aboard the gunboat USS Topeka during the Spanish–American War, and then served aboard the protected cruiser USS Newark during the Philippine Insurrection and the Boxer Rebellion. Returning to the United States in 1901, Day was assigned to the Boston Navy Yard and subsequently was Executive Officer of the transport USS Hancock during 1907.

From 1907 to 1909, at the rank of Lieutenant Commander, he served as Navigator of the flagship USS Connecticut and ex officio Fleet Navigator during the 'round the world cruise of the Great White Fleet. He commanded the destroyer USS Preston from 1909 to 1910, and Division 7 of the Torpedo Squadron, Atlantic Fleet, from 1910 to 1911. He was in charge of the Navy Publicity Bureau in New York City from 1911 to 1913, was the Executive Officer of the battleship USS New York from 1914 to 1915 during the occupation of Veracruz, and commanded the armored cruiser Brooklyn from 1915 to 1916.

By 1917 he was the Head of the Department of Compasses, Nautical Instruments, and Time Service at the Naval Observatory. During World War I, in the rank of Captain, he commanded the troop transport USS America, formerly the German liner SS Amerika, and was awarded the Navy Cross for this service. He commanded the armored cruiser USS Montana from 1918 to 1919 and the battleship USS Pennsylvania from 1920 to 1921, and was Commander, Submarines, Pacific, 1923 to 1925.

In 1923 he was a member of the Navy's Court of Inquiry on the Honda Point disaster. Promoted to Rear Admiral in 1925, he served first as Commandant of the 15th Naval District, and then as Commander of Light Cruiser Division 2 (Trenton, Milwaukee, Raleigh and Memphis) from June 1927 to April 1928 and Light Cruiser Division 3 (Richmond, Cincinnati and Marblehead) from April 1928 to July 1929. He was President of the Board of Inspection and Survey in 1929, was a member of the General Board in 1930 and again was President of the Board of Inspection and Survey from 1931 until his retirement in 1935.

After retirement, Day lived in Washington, D.C. In 1940, he died at the Naval Hospital there and was buried at Arlington National Cemetery.
