= Smith-class destroyer =

Destroyer class of the US Navy

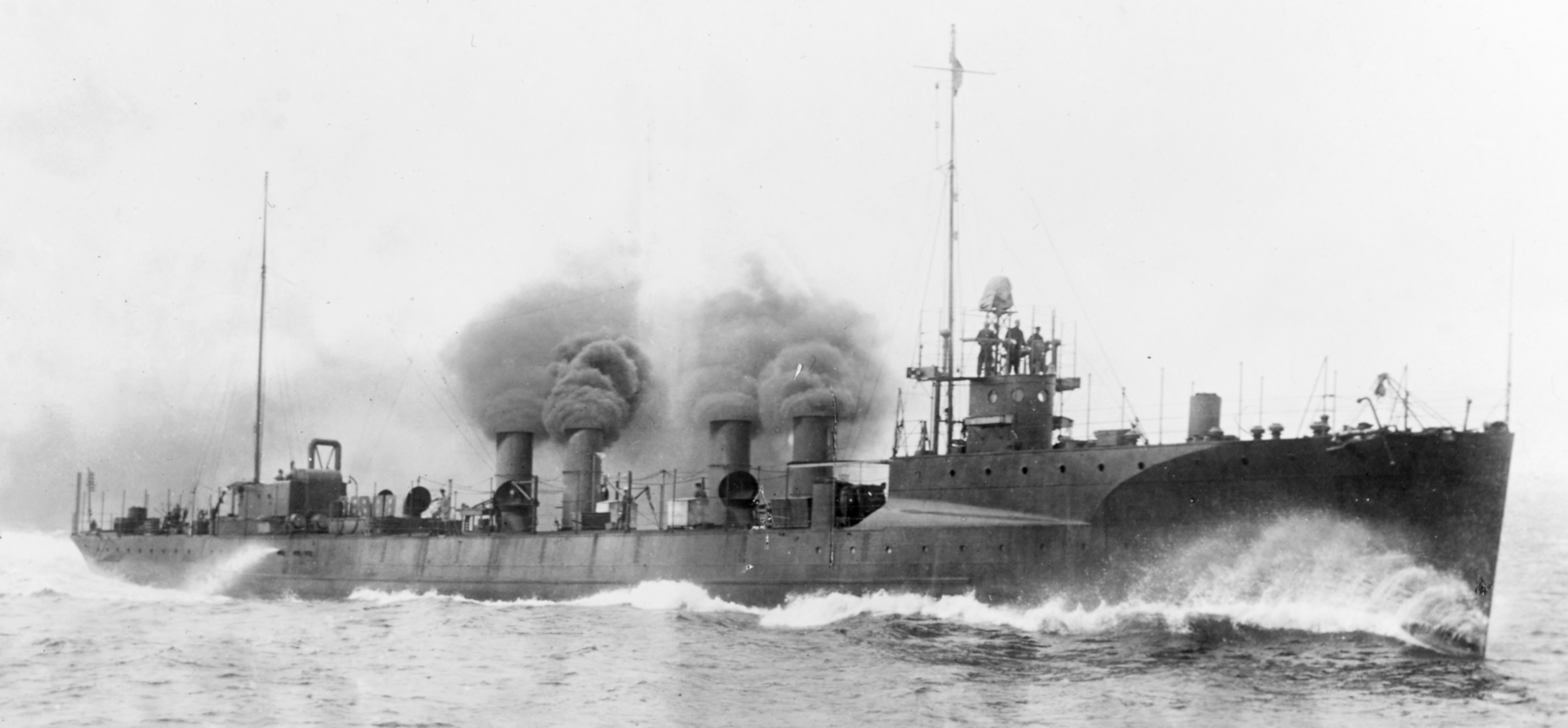
- USS Flusser

Class overview
- Name: Smith class
- Builders: Bath Iron Works, ME (2); William Cramp & Sons, PA (1); New York Shipbuilding, NJ (1)
- Operators: United States Navy
- Preceded by: Truxtun class
- Succeeded by: Paulding class
- Subclasses: Flusser
- Built: 1908–1910
- In commission: 1909–1919
- Completed: 5
- Scrapped: 5

General characteristics
- Type: Destroyer
- Displacement: 700 long tons (710 t) (normal); 902 long tons (916 t) (full load)
- Length: 293 ft 10 in (89.56 m)
- Beam: 26 ft 0 in (7.92 m)
- Draft: 8 ft 0 in (2.44 m)
- Installed power: 4 × Mosher coal-fired boilers; 3 × Parsons direct-drive steam turbines; 10,000 shp (7,500 kW) (design)
- Propulsion: 3 × shafts
- Speed: 28 knots (52 km/h; 32 mph) (design)
- Range: 2,800 nautical miles (5,200 km) at 10 knots (19 km/h; 12 mph)
- Capacity: 304 long tons (309 t) coal (fuel)
- Complement: 4 officers; 83 enlisted men
- Armament: 5 × 3 in (76 mm)/50 caliber guns; 3 × 18 inch (450 mm) torpedo tubes, six torpedoes

The Smith-class destroyers were the first ocean-going torpedo-boat destroyers in the United States Navy, and the first to be driven by steam turbines instead of the reciprocating engines fitted in the sixteen earlier and much smaller torpedo-boat destroyers ordered under the Act of 4 May 1898. Flusser and Reid are sometimes considered to be Flusser-class ships. Also, since Flusser was completed first, some period documentation refers to the entire class as Flussers.

The first three of the class were ordered under the Act of 29 June 1906 "to have the highest practical speed, and to cost, exclusive of armament, not to exceed seven hundred and fifty thousand dollars each". The remaining pair were ordered under the Act of 7 March 1907 "to have the highest practical speed, and to cost, exclusive of armament, not to exceed eight hundred thousand dollars each".

All of the ships served as convoy escorts in World War I, and several attacked U-boats. The latter four vessels were all sold in November 1919 following the end of World War I; Smith survived another two years as a bombing target until scrapped.

== Design ==
These were the first turbine-powered destroyers in US service, and the last to be coal-fired. Surprisingly, turbines were dictated by cost; when bids were opened, all of the turbine-powered proposals were lower than all of the reciprocating proposals. The Smiths were greatly enlarged Truxtuns; at 900 tons full load they were 50% larger. The extra displacement went into increased armament and more powerful machinery to maintain the Truxtuns' 28-knot (52 km/h; 32 mph) speed. The raised forecastle improved seaworthiness. Also, the coal capacity was increased to 304 tons, nearly half the total full load displacement of the previous class. The increased size and range meant that these were the US Navy's first truly ocean-going destroyers, capable of operating with battleships on long voyages. The seizure of the Philippines in the Spanish–American War and the acquisition of Hawaii, both in 1898, had shown the need for long-range ships. Shortly before the Smith class entered service, the Great White Fleet of 1907–09 demonstrated that the US Navy was prepared to operate far from home. Ironically, these destroyers would quickly be nicknamed "flivvers" (after the small and shaky Model T Ford) for their small size when the subsequent "thousand tonners" (Cassin through Sampson classes) entered service in 1913.

It was recognized that destroyers would now be fighting other destroyers rather than torpedo boats, and that destroyers also needed more offensive (a.k.a. torpedo) capability to take over the torpedo boats' role, while retaining the range and seakeeping qualities to operate with the battle fleet. This was the beginning of the multiple missions that US destroyers would eventually be expected to perform, including anti-submarine warfare beginning in World War I and anti-air warfare beginning in the 1930s.

=== Armament ===
Compared with the Truxtuns, the gun armament was increased to five 3-inch (76 mm)/50 caliber guns; smaller guns were deleted to maximize the number of larger guns. This followed a trend set by the rearmament of the British River-class destroyers in 1906, which reflected the "all big gun" design of the battleship HMS Dreadnought. A third 18-inch (457 mm) torpedo tube was added, and one torpedo reload per tube was provided. In 1911 it was noted that torpedoes fired from the stern mount at a ship's speed much above 20 knots ran erratically due to the stern wave deflecting them.

In 1916, all had their single torpedo tubes replaced by twin mounts (with no reloads) while one 3-inch gun was removed. This was an easy upgrade, as the new design twin mounts actually weighed less than the older single mounts. They were equipped with one or two depth charge racks for convoy escort during World War I.

=== Engineering ===
Unlike the earlier 16 destroyers, these turbine-driven vessels were triple-screw. The ships' steam turbines were direct drive and arranged in a similar manner to Sir Charles Parsons' Turbinia, with a high-pressure turbine on the center shaft exhausting to two low-pressure turbines on the outboard shafts. Cruising turbines were also fitted on the outboard shafts to improve fuel economy at low speeds, a problem that would plague turbine-powered ships until fully geared turbines and higher steam pressures and temperatures were introduced during World War I. To attempt to find a middle ground between the turbines' high efficient speed and the propellers' low efficient speed, the maximum shaft speed was 724 rpm, over twice that of a modern ship.

All had two widely spaced pairs of funnels except for Smith, which had the first and fourth funnels separated from the middle pair.

Smith had four Mosher coal-fired boilers supplying steam to three steam turbines totaling 10,000 shp (7,500 kW) (design). She made 28.35 kn (32.6 mph; 52.5 km/h) on trials at 9,946 shp (7,417 kW). Normal coal capacity was 304 tons.

== Ships in class ==
Ships of the Smith destroyer class
Name	Hull no.	Shipyard	Laid down	Launched	Comm- issioned	Decomm- issioned	Fate
Smith	DD-17	William Cramp & Sons, Philadelphia	18 March 1908	20 April 1909	26 November 1909	2 September 1919	Bombing target until sold 20 December 1921 to Joseph G. Hitner for scrapping
Lamson	DD-18	William Cramp & Sons	18 March 1908	16 June 1909	10 February 1910	15 July 1919	Sold November 1919 for scrapping
Preston	DD-19	New York Shipbuilding, Camden, New Jersey	28 April 1908	14 July 1909	21 December 1909	17 July 1919	Sold November 1919 to T. A. Scott of New London, Connecticut for scrapping
Flusser	DD-20	Bath Iron Works, Bath, Maine	3 August 1908	20 July 1909	28 October 1909	14 July 1919	Sold November 1919 for scrapping
Reid	DD-21	Bath Iron Works	3 August 1908	17 August 1909	3 December 1909	31 July 1919	Sold November 1919 to T. A. Scott of New London, Connecticut for scrapping

== Bibliography ==
- Bauer, K. Jack; Roberts, Stephen S. (1991). Register of Ships of the U.S. Navy, 1775–1990: Major Combatants. Westport, Connecticut: Greenwood Press. ISBN 0-313-26202-0.
- Friedman, Norman (2004). US Destroyers: An Illustrated Design History (Revised ed.). Annapolis: Naval Institute Press. ISBN 1-55750-442-3.
- Gardiner, Robert; Gray, Randal (1985). Conway's All the World's Fighting Ships 1906–1921. London: Conway Maritime Press. ISBN 0-85177-245-5.
- Silverstone, Paul H. (1970). U.S. Warships of World War I. London: Ian Allan. ISBN 0-71100-095-6.
