= USS Reid (DD-21) =

Smith-class destroyer

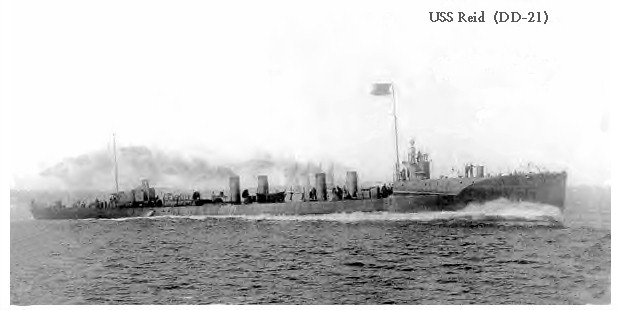
- USS Reid (DD-21) off Rockland, Maine, on trials c. 1909-1910.

History

United States
- Name: Reid
- Namesake: Master Samuel Chester Reid
- Builder: Bath Iron Works, Bath, Maine
- Laid down: 3 August 1908
- Launched: 17 August 1909
- Sponsored by: Miss Lina Andrews
- Commissioned: 3 December 1909
- Decommissioned: 31 July 1919
- Stricken: 15 September 1919
- Identification: Hull symbol: DD-21
- Fate: Sold, 21 November 1919 and broken up for scrap

General characteristics
- Class & type: Smith-class destroyer
- Displacement: 700 long tons (710 t) normal
- Length: 293 ft 10 in (89.56 m)
- Beam: 26 ft 5 in (8.05 m)
- Draft: 10 ft 7 in (3,230 mm)
- Speed: 31 kn (36 mph; 57 km/h)
- Complement: 89 officers and crew
- Armament: 5 × 3 in (76 mm)/50 caliber guns; 3 × 18 inch (450 mm) torpedo tubes

USS Reid (DD–21) was a Smith-class destroyer in the United States Navy during World War I. She was the first ship named for Samuel Chester Reid.

== Construction ==
Reid was laid down by the Bath Iron Works, Bath, Maine, on 3 August 1908, launched on 17 August 1909, sponsored by Miss Lina Andrews, and commissioned on 3 December 1909.

== Pre-World War I ==
Assigned to the Atlantic Torpedo Flotilla, an organization redesignated many times in the years which followed, Reid operated along the east coast - primarily engaged in training exercises and drills - until the United States entered World War I.

== World War I ==
On 6 April 1917, Reid was attached to the Southern Patrol Force, operating out of Key West, Florida. On the 14th, she moved north and on the 18th joined Squadron 1, Patrol Force at Boston, Massachusetts. Transferred to Squadron 2 in early May, she patrolled the northeast coast of the United States until detached from the Patrol Force on 15 May and assigned to the Destroyer Force. Reporting on the 17th, she escorted coastal traffic and patrolled the approaches to New York City until ordered to Charleston, South Carolina, to prepare for distant service on 5 July.

Reid sailed east on 21 July, and from 1 August-30 September provided escort and patrol services in the vicinity of the Azores. Detached in October, she proceeded to Brest, whence she resumed her patrol and escort mission. On the 23rd, she was rammed and damaged above the waterline by W. T. James. Repairs were completed quickly at Brest, and she continued her work without further interruption until the end of the war. During that period, she made several attacks on submarines, most notably against UB-55 on 18 March 1918 and U-86 on 1 July, but she failed to sink any.

== Inter-war period ==
Relieved after the Armistice, Reid departed Brest for Charleston and inactivation on 11 December. Arriving on the 31st, she later shifted to Philadelphia, Pennsylvania, where she was decommissioned on 31 July 1919. She was struck from the Naval Vessel Register on 15 September and was sold to T. A. Scott & Company, New London, Connecticut, on 21 November.

== Noteworthy commanding officers ==
- Ensign Charles Alan Pownall (1914-Unknown) (Later Rear admiral and 3rd Military Governor of Guam)
