= USS Sampson (DD-63) =

Sampson-class destroyer

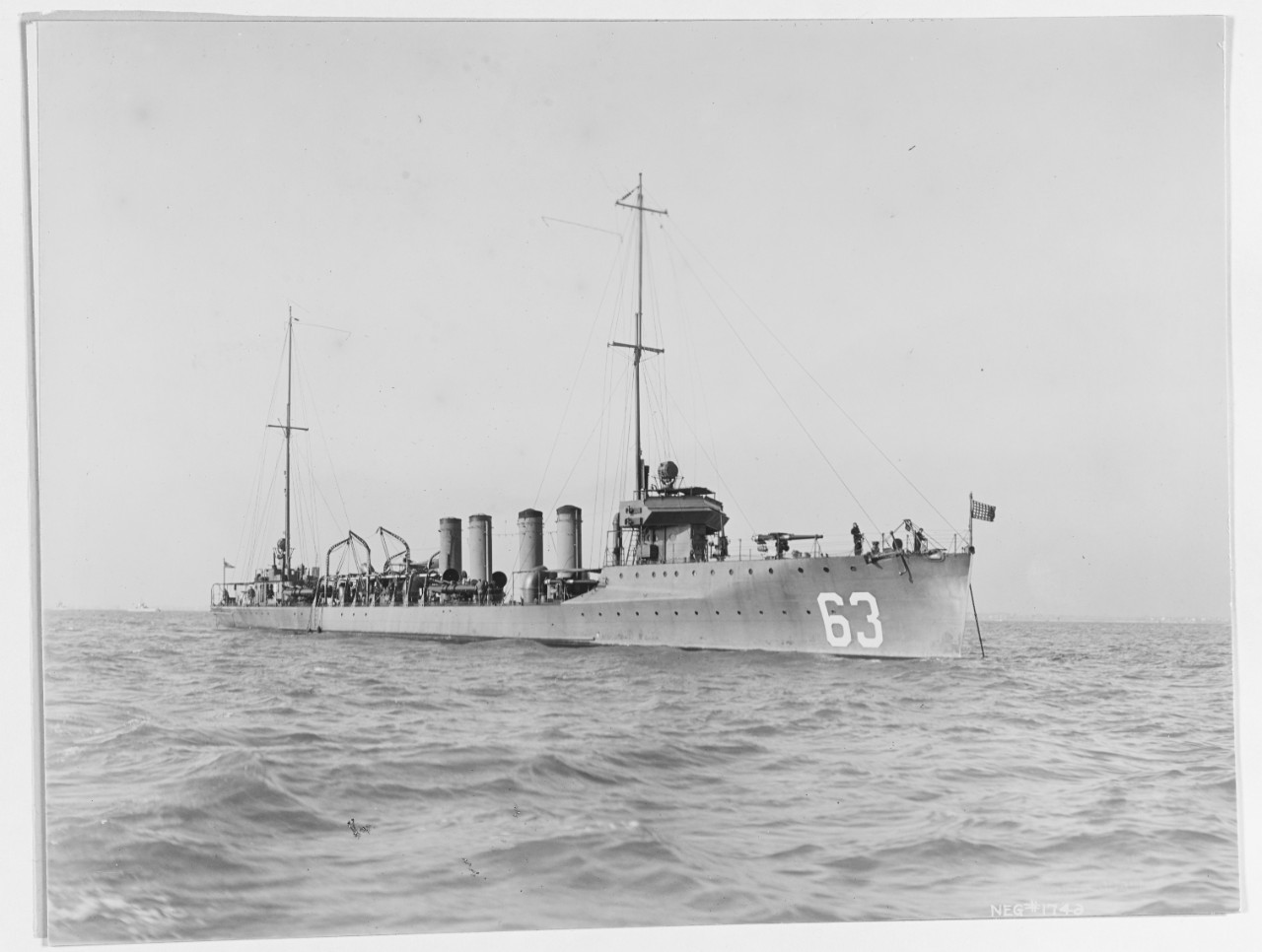
- USS Sampson (DD-63)

History

United States
- Name: USS Sampson
- Namesake: Admiral William T. Sampson (1840–1902)
- Builder: Fore River Shipbuilding Company, Quincy, Massachusetts
- Laid down: 21 April 1915
- Launched: 4 March 1916
- Commissioned: 27 June 1916
- Decommissioned: 15 June 1921
- Stricken: 7 January 1936
- Identification: DD-63
- Fate: Sold for scrapping 8 September 1936

General characteristics
- Class & type: Sampson-class destroyer
- Displacement: 1,111 tons (normal), 1,225 tons (full load)
- Length: 315 ft 3 in (96.09 m)
- Beam: 30 ft 7 in (9.32 m)
- Draft: 10 ft 9 in (3.28 m)
- Propulsion: 4 Boilers; 2 Curtis Turbines: 17,696 hp (13,196 kW)
- Speed: 29.5 knots (54.6 km/h)
- Complement: 99 officers and crew
- Armament: 4 × 4-inch (100 mm)/50 guns; 2 × 1-pounder (37 mm) AA guns; 12 × 21-inch (533 mm) torpedo tubes (4 × 3)

USS Sampson (DD-63) was the lead ship of her class of destroyers of the United States Navy. She was the first Navy ship named for Admiral William T. Sampson (1840–1902).

== Construction and commissioning ==
Sampson was laid down on 21 April 1915 by the Fore River Shipbuilding Company at Quincy, Massachusetts, launched on 4 March 1916, sponsored by Miss Marjorie Sampson Smith, and commissioned at the Boston Navy Yard in Boston, Massachusetts, on 27 June 1916.

== Service history ==
=== World War I ===
Sampson was assigned to Division 9 of the Atlantic Destroyer Force and conducted shakedown training based at Narragansett Bay in Rhode Island. The United States entered World War I on 6 April 1917, and during the war she was commanded by Lieutenant Commander Mark L. Hersey, Jr. – the son of Major General Mark L. Hersey. The younger Hersey received the Navy Cross for distinguished service while commanding Sampson and would rise to the rank of commodore during World War II.

After war games off Provincetown, Massachusetts, Sampson cleared Tompkinsville, Staten Island, New York, on 15 May 1917 to join the escort screen of a convoy which touched at Halifax, Nova Scotia, Canada, and reached Queenstown (now Cobh), Ireland, on 25 May 1917. She reported for duty with the United States Naval Forces operating in European waters and was assigned to convoy escort duty in the approaches to the British Isles, basing her operations from Queenstown. Two British-type depth charge projectors were installed on her stern and, on 29 May 1917, she commenced escort duty. She protected troop transports and merchant ship convoys from Imperial German Navy submarines throughout the remainder of World War I.

On 18 June 1917, Sampson rescued two small boatloads of survivors of steamer English Monarch and the captain and 13 sailors from the steamer Elele. The next morning, she picked up another 17 survivors of Elele; and on 20 June 1917 she landed all at Queenstown. Sampson answered other distress calls before the end of the war, and she made several attacks to drive off submarines reported or seen near her convoys. World War I ended on 11 November 1918.

=== Post-war ===
Sampson steamed to France with the Queenstown division of destroyers on 29 November 1918 and stood out from Brest Harbor in France on 12 December 1918 to escort President Woodrow Wilson aboard the liner George Washington into the harbor. Returning to Queenstown on 14 December 1918, she departed for the United States on the 26 December 1918 and arrived at the New York Navy Yard in Brooklyn, New York, on 7 January 1919.

==== 4th Division, 2nd Flotilla Destroyer Force ====
After repairs at the New York Navy Yard, Sampson was assigned to the 4th Division, 2d Flotilla, of the Destroyer Force and departed on 22 March 1919 to base her operations from the Naval Torpedo Station at Newport, Rhode Island. She reported to the Inspector of Ordnance for experimental testing of torpedoes and naval mines, but interrupted this duty in May 1919 to assist in guarding the route of NC-4 during that seaplane's crossing of the Atlantic Ocean, the world's first successful trans-oceanic flight.

== Decommissioning and disposal ==
Sampson entered the New York Navy Yard on 1 December 1919 for deactivation overhaul which was completed on 14 February 1921.

Towed to the Philadelphia Navy Yard in Philadelphia, Pennsylvania, Sampson was decommissioned on 15 June 1921. She remained inactive during the years that followed, and on 17 July 1935 was ordered scrapped in accordance with the London Naval Treaty. Her name was struck from the Navy list on 7 January 1936, and on 8 September 1936 she was sold for scrap for $18,750.00 to the Boston Iron and Metal Company, Inc., of Baltimore, Maryland.
