= USS Lamson (DD-18) =

Smith-class destroyer

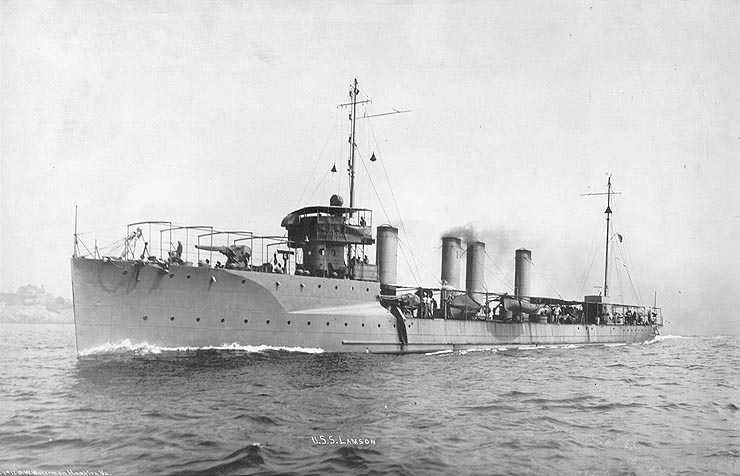
- USS Lamson (DD-18) underway in 1912.

History

United States
- Name: Lamson
- Namesake: Lieutenant Roswell Lamson
- Builder: William Cramp & Sons, Philadelphia
- Yard number: 351
- Laid down: 18 March 1908
- Launched: 16 June 1909
- Sponsored by: Mrs. Henry S. Gore
- Commissioned: 10 February 1910
- Decommissioned: 15 July 1919
- Stricken: 15 September 1919
- Identification: Hull symbol: DD-18
- Fate: Sold 1919

General characteristics
- Class & type: Smith-class destroyer
- Displacement: 700 long tons (710 t) normal
- Length: 293 ft 10 in (89.56 m)
- Beam: 26 ft 5 in (8.05 m)
- Draft: 10 ft 7 in (3,230 mm)
- Speed: 31 kn (36 mph; 57 km/h)
- Complement: 89 officers and crew
- Armament: 5 × 3 in (76 mm)/50 caliber guns; 3 × 18 inch (450 mm) torpedo tubes

USS Lamson (DD–18) was a Smith-class destroyer in the United States Navy during World War I. She was the first ship named for Roswell Lamson.

== Construction ==
Lamson was laid down on 18 March 1908, by William Cramp & Sons, Philadelphia, launched on 16 June 1909, sponsored by Mrs. Henry S. Grove, and commissioned on 10 February 1910.

== Service history ==
=== Pre-World War I ===
Assigned to the Atlantic Squadron, Lamson operated along the east coast and in the Caribbean from 1910 to 1916 participating in torpedo exercises, fleet maneuvers, and coastal patrol. Departing Key West, Florida on 7 May 1916, the destroyer arrived Dominican Republic two days later to support the Marines sent by President Woodrow Wilson to protect American interests during the Dominican revolt.

She returned to Key West in mid-June before sailing on the 28th for Vera Cruz. She joined other American ships in Mexican waters, as the Mexican political situation was still in turmoil. Following her return to Key West on 11 July, Lamson operated along the east coast and in the Gulf of Mexico until the United States entered World War I.

=== World War I ===
During the early months of the war, she patrolled the coastline before preparing for oversea service. Arriving Ponta Delgada, Azores on 26 July 1917, the destroyer performed escort and patrol duty for the next three months. Lamson departed the Azores on 6 October for escort operations out of Brest, France. She assisted survivors of Finland on 28 October after the merchant ship had been torpedoed by a German submarine.

The destroyer continued escort and patrol operations for the rest of the war, and aided in the victory of Allied forces by neutralizing the German U-boat threat to convoys. After the Armistice, Lamson departed Brest on 11 December 1918 and arrived at Charleston, South Carolina on 31 December. She decommissioned on 15 July 1919 and was sold on 21 November.

== Noteworthy commanding officers ==
- Lieutenant Herbert F. Leary (23 March 1911-Unknown) (Later vice admiral)
- Lieutenant Harold Rainsford Stark (September 1912-7 June 1913) (Later admiral and Chief of Naval Operations)
- Lieutenant Commander William R. Purnell (30 April 1917 – 14 June 1918) (Later rear admiral)
- Lieutenant Commander Donald B. Beary (14 June 1918 – 15 July 1919) (Later vice admiral)

== Honors and awards ==
- Mexican Service Medal
- Dominican Campaign Medal
- World War I Victory Medal
