= USS D-1 =

D-class submarine of the United States

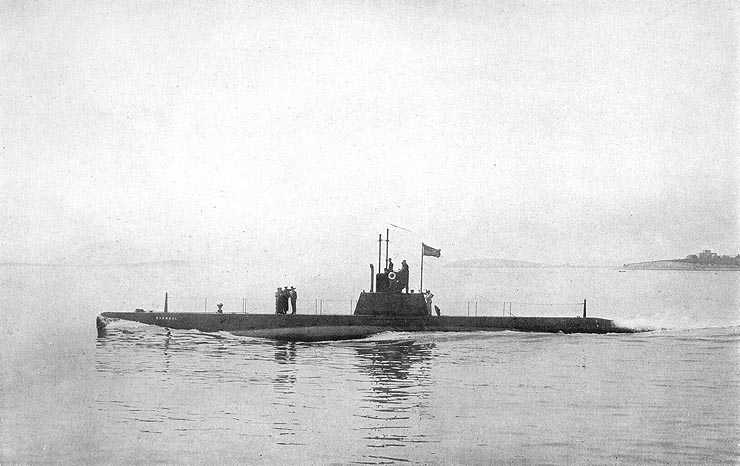
- USS Narwhal underway, c. 1909-1911

History

United States
- Name: Narwhal
- Namesake: The Narwhal
- Builder: Fore River Shipbuilding Company, Quincy, Massachusetts
- Cost: $377,234.25 (hull and machinery)
- Laid down: 16 April 1908
- Launched: 8 April 1909
- Sponsored by: Mrs. Alice Davison
- Commissioned: 23 November 1909
- Decommissioned: 8 February 1922
- Renamed: D-1 (Submarine No.17), 17 November 1911
- Stricken: 8 February 1922
- Identification: Hull symbol: SS-17 (17 July 1920); Call sign: NKX
- Fate: Sold for scrapping, 5 June 1922

General characteristics
- Class & type: D-class submarine
- Displacement: 288 long tons (293 t) surfaced; 337 long tons (342 t) submerged
- Length: 134 ft 10 in (41.10 m)
- Beam: 13 ft 11 in (4.24 m)
- Draft: 12 ft 6 in (3.81 m)
- Installed power: 600 bhp (450 kW) (gasoline); 330 hp (250 kW) (electric)
- Propulsion: 2 × Craig Shipbuilding Company gasoline engine; 2 × Electro Dynamic electric motors, 2 × 60-Cell batteries; 2 × Propeller
- Speed: 13 kn (24 km/h; 15 mph) surfaced; 9.5 kn (17.6 km/h; 10.9 mph) submerged
- Range: 1,179 nmi (2,184 km; 1,357 mi) at 9.3 knots (17.2 km/h; 10.7 mph) surfaced; 24 nmi (44 km; 28 mi) at 8 kn (15 km/h; 9.2 mph) submerged
- Test depth: 200 feet (61.0 m)
- Complement: 1 officer; 14 enlisted
- Armament: 4 × 18 inch (450 mm) bow torpedo tubes (4 torpedoes)

USS Narwhal/D-1 (SS-17), also known as "Submarine No. 17", was the lead ship of the D-class submarines of the United States Navy (USN). She was the first ship of the USN to be named for the narwhal, a gray and white arctic whale which averages 20 ft (6.1 m) in length, the male of which has a long, helical ivory tusk of commercial value.

== Design ==
The D-class submarines were enlarged versions of the preceding C class, the first American submarines armed with four torpedo tubes. They had a length of 134 ft 10 in (41.10 m) overall, a beam of 13 ft 10 in (4.22 m) and a mean draft of 12 ft 6 in (3.81 m). They displaced 288 long tons (293 t) on the surface and 337 long tons (342 t) submerged. The D-class boats had a crew of 1 officer and 14 enlisted men. They had a diving depth of 200 ft (61 m).

For surface running, they were powered by two 300-brake-horsepower (224 kW) gasoline engines, each driving one propeller shaft. When submerged each propeller was driven by a 165-horsepower (123 kW) electric motor. They could reach 13 kn (24 km/h; 15 mph) on the surface and 9.5 kn (17.6 km/h; 10.9 mph) underwater. On the surface, the boats had a range of 1,179 nmi (2,184 km; 1,357 mi) at 9.6 kn (17.8 km/h; 11.0 mph) and 24 nmi (44 km; 28 mi) at 8 kn (15 km/h; 9.2 mph) submerged.

The boats were armed with four 18-inch (450 mm) torpedo tubes in the bow. They did not carry reloads for them.

== Construction ==
Narwhal's keel was laid down by Fore River Shipbuilding Company, in Quincy, Massachusetts, under a subcontract from Electric Boat Company, of Groton, Connecticut. She was launched on 8 April 1909, sponsored by Mrs. Alice Davison, the wife of Gregory C. Davison, the vice president of Electric Boat, and daughter of Rear Admiral Edwin M. Shepard. Narwhal was commissioned on 23 November 1909.

== Service history ==
Narwhal joined the Atlantic Torpedo Fleet, based at Newport, Rhode Island. Narwhal was renamed D-1 on 17 November 1911. She operated on the diving grounds in Cape Cod and Narragansett Bays, Long Island and Block Island Sounds and Chesapeake Bay, and off Norfolk, Virginia; on target ranges proving torpedoes; experimental operations; and cruises along the East Coast.

From 20 January – 11 April 1913, the submarine flotilla cruised to the Caribbean Sea, and from 5 January – 21 April 1914 visited Gulf and Florida ports.

During World War I, D-1 trained crews and classes of officers and served in experiments in the Third Naval District. After overhaul, D-1 was placed in commission in reserve on 9 September 1919, continuing her work of training new submariners along with experimental and development work.

== Fate ==
On 15 July 1921, she was placed in commission, in ordinary. She was towed to Philadelphia Navy Yard, arriving on 30 January 1922. Decommissioned on 8 February, her hulk was sold on 5 June 1922.

== Whale encounter ==
The New York World quoted Lt. Chester Nimitz, in command of Narwhal in August 1911, with regards to an encounter with whales that the submarine had. This encounter is not referenced anywhere else and may be journalistic hyperbole.

== Bibliography ==
- "Table 21 - Ships on Navy List June 30, 1919". Congressional Serial Set. U.S. Government Printing Office: 764. 1921.
- Gary, Priolo. "Narwhal / D-1 (SS-17)". Navsource.net.
- Cressman, Robert J. (12 May 2021). "D-1 (Submarine Torpedo Boat No. 17)". Dictionary of American Naval Fighting Ships. Navy Department, Naval History and Heritage Command. This article incorporates text from this source, which is in the public domain.
- Friedman, Norman (1995). U.S. Submarines Through 1945: An Illustrated Design History. Annapolis, Maryland: Naval Institute Press. ISBN 1-55750-263-3.
- Gardiner, Robert & Gray, Randal, eds. (1985). Conway's All the World's Fighting Ships 1906–1921. Annapolis, Maryland: Naval Institute Press. ISBN 0-85177-245-5.
