= USS Flusser (DD-20) =

Smith-class destroyer

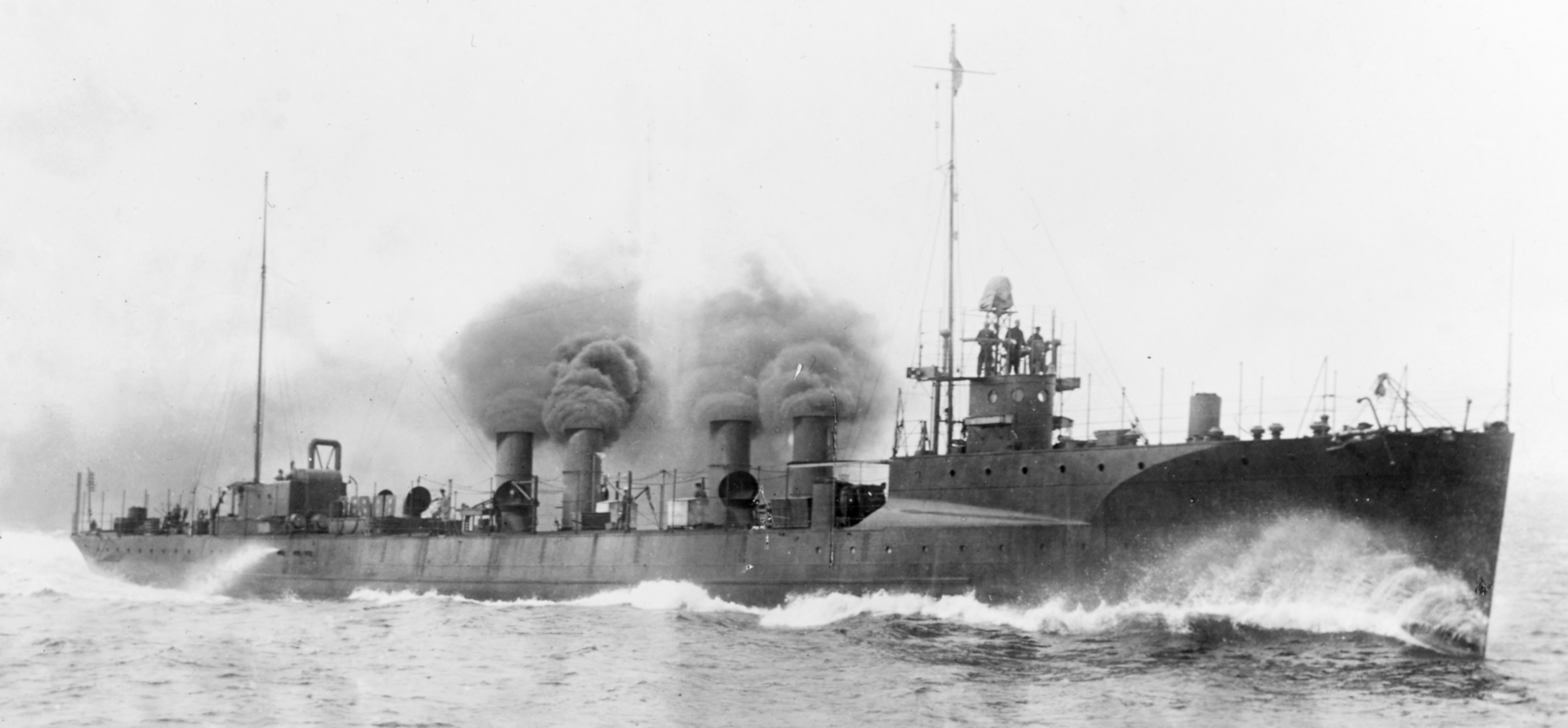
- USS Flusser (DD-20) in 1909 during trials making 26 knots, note funnel arrangement.

History

United States
- Name: Flusser
- Namesake: Lieutenant commander Charles W. Flusser
- Builder: Bath Iron Works, Bath, Maine
- Laid down: 3 August 1908
- Launched: 20 July 1909
- Sponsored by: Miss Genevieve Virden, grand-niece of Lieutenant Commander Flusser
- Commissioned: 28 October 1909
- Decommissioned: 14 July 1919
- Stricken: 15 September 1919
- Identification: Hull symbol: DD-20
- Fate: Sold, 15 November 1919 and broken up for scrap

General characteristics
- Class & type: Smith-class destroyer
- Displacement: 700 long tons (710 t) normal
- Length: 293 ft 10 in (89.56 m)
- Beam: 26 ft 5 in (8.05 m)
- Draft: 10 ft 7 in (3,230 mm)
- Speed: 31 kn (36 mph; 57 km/h)
- Complement: 89 officers and crew
- Armament: 5 × 3 in (76 mm)/50 caliber guns; 3 × 18 inch (450 mm) torpedo tubes

USS Flusser (DD–20) was a Smith-class destroyer in the United States Navy during World War I. She was the second ship named for Lieutenant commander Charles W. Flusser.

== Construction ==
Flusser was launched on 20 July 1909, by Bath Iron Works, Bath, Maine, sponsored by Miss Genevieve Virden, grandniece of Commander Flusser; and commissioned on 28 October 1909.

== Pre-World War I ==
Flusser arrived at Charleston, South Carolina – her home port – on 17 December 1909, and began her participation in the regular operating schedule of the Atlantic Torpedo Fleet, an organization many times redesignated in the years that followed. She cruised from the Caribbean to the coast of New England until August 1916, when she began neutrality patrols off New York and in Long Island Sound.

== World War I ==
After a repair period at New Orleans, Louisiana early in 1917, Flusser had escort duty on the east coast until 30 July 1917, when she departed Charleston for two months of ocean escort and patrol duty based on Ponta Delgada, Azores. She had similar duty out of Brest, France, operating across the English Channel from 22 October – 9 December 1918, returning to Charleston on 31 December. She was decommissioned at Philadelphia, Pennsylvania on 14 July 1919, and sold on 21 November.

== Noteworthy commanding officers ==
- Lieutenant William Henry Allen (12 October 1911 – August 1912) (Later Rear admiral)
- Lieutenant William Halsey, Jr. (August 1912 – 5 September 1913) (Later Fleet Admiral)
