= USS Preston (DD-19) =

Smith-class destroyer

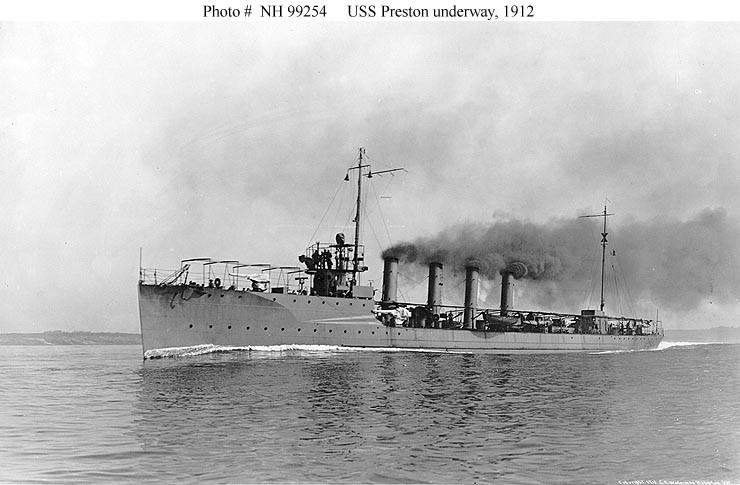
- USS Preston (DD-19) underway in 1912

History

United States
- Name: Preston
- Namesake: Lieutenant Samuel W. Preston
- Builder: New York Shipbuilding Corporation, Camden, New Jersey
- Laid down: 28 April 1908
- Launched: 14 July 1909
- Sponsored by: Miss Katherine Magoun
- Commissioned: 21 December 1909
- Decommissioned: 17 July 1919
- Stricken: 15 September 1919
- Identification: Hull symbol: DD-19
- Fate: Sold, 21 November 1919 and broken up for scrap

General characteristics
- Class & type: Smith-class destroyer
- Displacement: 700 long tons (710 t) normal
- Length: 293 ft 10 in (89.56 m)
- Beam: 26 ft 5 in (8.05 m)
- Draft: 10 ft 7 in (3,230 mm)
- Speed: 31 kn (36 mph; 57 km/h)
- Complement: 89 officers and crew
- Armament: 5 × 3 in (76 mm)/50 caliber guns; 3 × 18 inch (450 mm) torpedo tubes

USS Preston (DD–19) was a Smith-class destroyer in the United States Navy during World War I. She was the third ship named for Samuel W. Preston.

== Construction ==
Preston was laid down on 28 April 1908 by the New York Shipbuilding Company, Camden, New Jersey, launched on 14 July 1909, sponsored by Miss Katherine Magoun, and commissioned on 21 December 1909, Lieutenant commander George C. Day in command.

== World War I ==
Preston, attached to Destroyer Force, Atlantic Fleet, conducted peacetime patrols and participated in various individual, squadron, and fleet exercises until assigned to neutrality duties prior to the entry of the United States into World War I. At New York on 6 April 1917, she sailed within the week for Boston, Massachusetts, where she continued patrol duties until 12 May. Then reassigned to Destroyer Force, Atlantic, she performed coastal escort and patrol duties for two months. In July, she sailed east, and from 1 August to 5 October she patrolled and performed escort work off the strategically located Azores. Next ordered to Brest, she conducted similar missions along the French coast until the Armistice. On 11 December 1918, she sailed for the United States, arriving at Charleston, South Carolina on 4 January 1919.

Later shifted to Philadelphia, Pennsylvania, she decommissioned on 17 July and her name was struck from the Naval Vessel Register on 15 September. On 21 November, the coal burning "Flivver" was sold to the T. A. Scott Company of New London, Connecticut.

== Noteworthy commanding officers ==
- Lieutenant commander George C. Day (21 December 1909 – 1910) (Later Rear admiral)
- Lieutenant Herbert F. Leary (1912-Unknown) (Later Vice admiral)
