= USS Smith (DD-17) =

Smith-class destroyer

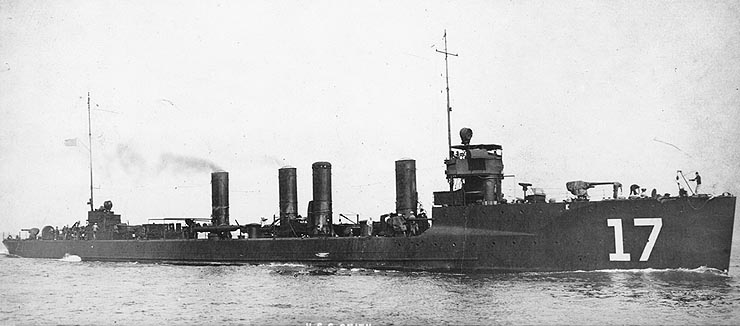
- USS Smith(DD-17) securing from action stations, just prior to entering New York Harbor in late March 1917.

History

United States
- Name: Smith
- Namesake: Lieutenant Joseph B. Smith
- Builder: William Cramp & Sons, Philadelphia
- Yard number: 350
- Laid down: 18 March 1908
- Launched: 20 April 1909
- Sponsored by: Mrs. Edward Bridge Richardson
- Commissioned: 26 November 1909
- Decommissioned: 2 September 1919
- Stricken: 15 September 1919
- Identification: Hull symbol: DD-17
- Fate: Sold for scrapping, 20 December 1921

General characteristics
- Class & type: Smith-class destroyer
- Displacement: 700 long tons (710 t) normal
- Length: 293 ft 10 in (89.56 m)
- Beam: 26 ft 5 in (8.05 m)
- Draft: 10 ft 7 in (3.23 m)
- Speed: 31 kn (36 mph; 57 km/h)
- Complement: 89 officers and crew
- Armament: 5 × 3 in (76 mm)/50 caliber guns; 3 × 18 inch (450 mm) torpedo tubes

USS Smith (DD–17) was the lead ship of Smith-class destroyers in the United States Navy. She was the first ship named for Lieutenant Joseph B. Smith. Entering service in 1909, the destroyer was placed in reserve in 1912. She was reactivated for World War I and, following the war, was used as a test ship for aerial bombing. In 1921, the vessel was sold for scrapping.

== Construction and career ==
Smith was laid down on 18 March 1908, by William Cramp & Sons, Philadelphia, and launched on 20 April 1909, sponsored by Mrs. Edward Bridge Richardson. She was commissioned on 26 November 1909.

Smith was attached to the Atlantic Torpedo Fleet upon commissioning and, after three years of active service, was placed in reserve in October 1912. Reactivated with reduced complements in December 1915, for Neutrality Patrol duty off Boston, Massachusetts, Smith arrived in New Orleans, Louisiana on 10 December, for recruiting duty with the Naval Auxiliary Reserve. She arrived at Key West, Florida on 12 February 1916, and at New York, on 15 February, to continue recruiting duty.

=== World War I ===
With war imminent, Smith was ordered on 1 April 1917, to anchor in the North River, to assist the Collector of Customs in preventing the German ships at New York from escaping or destroying themselves. She departed New York, on 4 April, and operated with the Patrol Force along the East Coast from 10 April-14 May. On 17 April, she reported sighting a submarine which submerged, and then saw a torpedo wake cross her bow; however, neither inflicted damage on the other. Smith underwent overhaul at the Charleston Navy Yard from 17 May-16 July, during which time she prepared for distant service.

Smith departed Charleston, South Carolina on 16 July, and after a stop at Bermuda from 18–20 July, and three months of patrols in the Azores from 26 July-5 October, she arrived at Brest, France on 20 October. For the remainder of the war, Smith escorted eastbound and westbound convoys through the submarine danger area extending about 500 mi (800 km) to the westward of Brest. Her escort missions were largely uneventful and, despite several sightings of suspected submarines, she made no confirmed kills. She was called upon twice, however, to rescue survivors of torpedoed transports. On 31 May 1918, she rescued 240 men from President Lincoln, and, while carrying them into port, unsuccessfully attacked a submarine on 1 June. On 1 July, she rescued survivors from Covington while other destroyers circled the two ships at high speed to deter submarine attack.

=== Inter-war period ===
Smith underwent repairs in England from 16 September-3 November, and after the end of the war, at Brest, from 7 March-2 April 1919. She sailed for the United States on 11 May; and, after arriving at Philadelphia, was decommissioned there on 2 September. She was ordered sold on 28 February 1920, but was withdrawn from sale on 9 June, in response to a request from the Bureau of Construction and Repair for a destroyer, a submarine, and a battleship for exhaustive bombing experiments. On 18 September, Smith was anchored in Chesapeake Bay, with Indiana and G-1, for the tests, which were completed on 5 November. Smith was then towed back to Philadelphia, and after again being designated a bombing target on 20 July 1921, was sold on 20 December, to Henry A. Hitner's Sons Company of Philadelphia, for scrapping.
