= USS Mayflower (1866) =

Tugboat of the United States Navy

History

United States
- Namesake: A species of shrubs and trees of the arbutus genus with white or pink flowers and scarlet berries.
- Builder: James Tetlow, Chelsea, Massachusetts
- Launched: 1866
- Commissioned: Circa 16 February 1866 at Boston, Massachusetts
- Decommissioned: Circa 23 September 1892
- Stricken: 23 September 1892
- Fate: Sold 27 December 1893 at Boston, Massachusetts

General characteristics
- Displacement: 420 tons
- Length: 137 ft (42 m)
- Beam: 26 ft (7.9 m)
- Draft: 9 ft 6 in (2.90 m)
- Propulsion: Steam engine, screw propelled
- Speed: 10.6 knots (19.6 km/h; 12.2 mph)

USS Mayflower was a screw tugboat acquired by the United States Navy at the end of the American Civil War. She performed a variety of duties, including survey work, along the New England and mid-Atlantic coasts of the United States. On completion of her official duties, she was recommissioned and issued to the United States Naval Academy at Annapolis, Maryland, for use as a training ship for midshipmen.

== Service history ==
Mayflower -– the first U.S. Navy ship to bear that name—was a screw tug built for the Navy in 1866 at Chelsea, Massachusetts, by James Tetlow. She got underway from the Boston Navy Yard 16 February 1866 and arrived Norfolk, Virginia, on 21 February. Laid up in ordinary in the Norfolk Navy Yard until 1870 she sailed for Annapolis, Maryland, 30 September to prepare for service on the expedition to Tehuantepec, Mexico, to survey the isthmus for a possible inter-oceanic canal. The expedition got underway from Hampton Roads, Virginia, 14 October and reached Minatitlan, Mexico, 11 November. After gathering valuable data about the topography of Central America during the winter and spring, Mayflower returned to the Washington Navy Yard 25 May.

She remained in the Potomac River until sailing for Portsmouth, New Hampshire, 19 August 1872 for duty as a dispatch boat. In the years that followed she served at Norfolk, Annapolis, and Washington, D.C. until she decommissioned 20 October 1874. After repairs at Camden, New Jersey, Mayflower recommissioned 11 May 1876, and two days later got underway for Annapolis for duty as a training ship at the United States Naval Academy. Her valuable service teaching the art of seamanship to the Nation’s future naval leaders continued until Mayflower was struck from the Navy list 23 September 1892. Mayflower was decommissioned and sold to Thomas Butler & Co., of Boston, Massachusetts, 27 December 1893.
