= Sampson-class destroyer =

Destroyer class of the US Navy

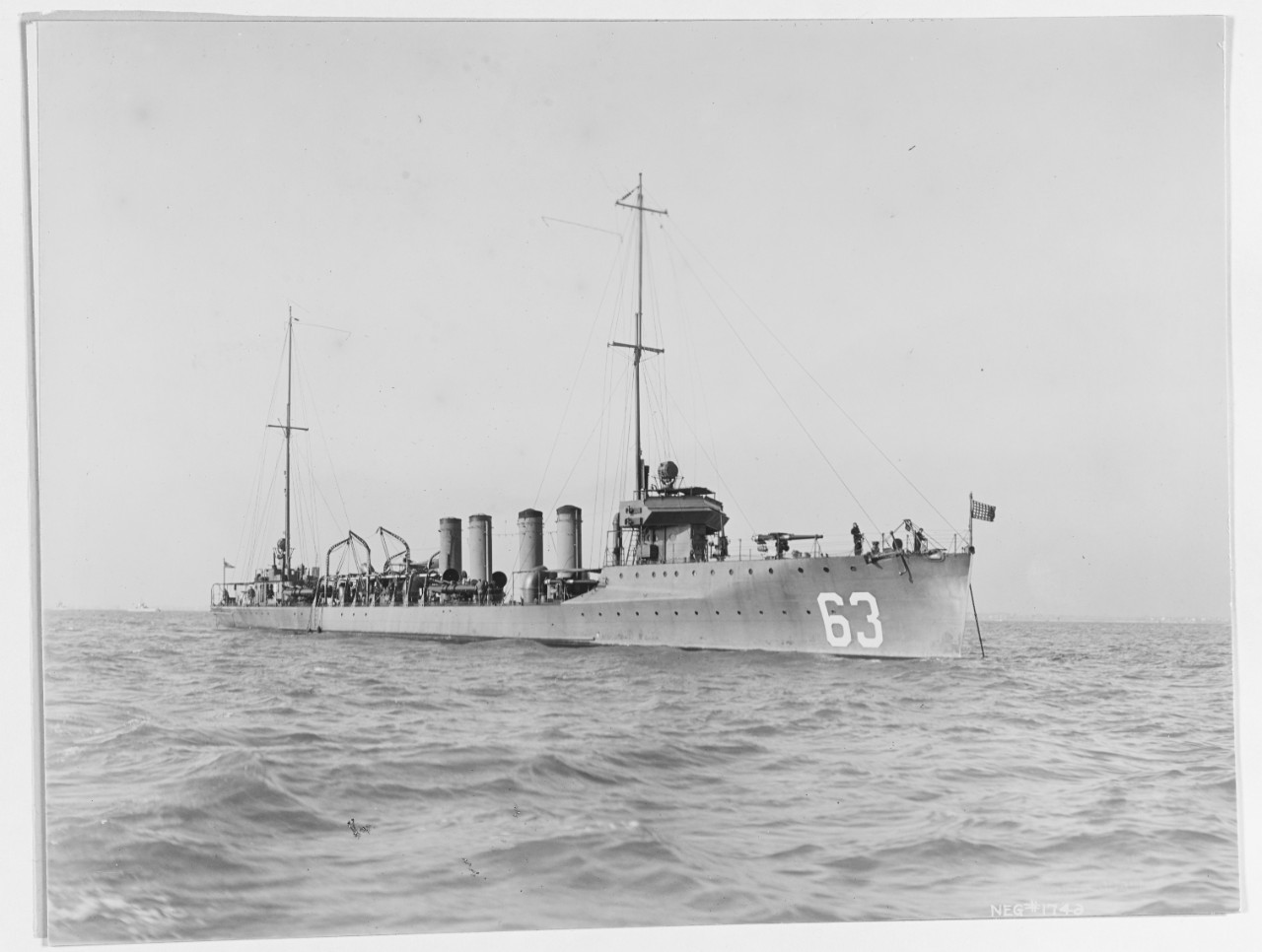
- USS Sampson

Class overview
- Name: Sampson class
- Builders: Fore River Shipbuilding, MA(2); Bath Iron Works, ME (2); William Cramp & Sons, PA (1); Mare Island Navy Yard, CA (1)
- Operators: United States Navy; United States Coast Guard
- Preceded by: Tucker class
- Succeeded by: Caldwell class
- Built: 1915–1917
- In commission: 1916–1945
- Completed: 6
- Scrapped: 6

General characteristics
- Type: Destroyer
- Displacement: 1,111 tons (normal); 1,225 tons (full load)
- Length: 315 ft 3 in (96.09 m)
- Beam: 30 ft 7 in (9.32 m)
- Draft: 10 ft 9 in (3.28 m)
- Installed power: 17,696 shp (13,196 kW)
- Propulsion: 4 × Yarrow water-tube boilers; 2 × Curtis steam turbines; 2 × shafts
- Speed: 29.5 kn (54.6 km/h; 33.9 mph)
- Complement: 99 officers and crew
- Sensors & processing systems: 1 × SC radar
- Armament: 4 × 4 in (102 mm)/50 caliber guns; 2 × 1-pounder (37 mm) AA guns; 4 × triple 21 in (533 mm) torpedo tubes; 1 × Depth charge track (aft); 1 × Y-gun depth charge launcher

The Sampson-class destroyers served in the United States Navy during World War I. Commissioned in 1916 and 1917, the class was a modification of the O'Brien and Tucker classes, with the number of 21-inch (533 mm) torpedo tubes increased from four twin-mounts to four triple-mounts. The Sampsons were the final six ships of the 26 "thousand tonner" destroyers. They were the largest and most heavily armed of the "thousand tonners", and the subsequent "flush deck" classes differed mainly in hull design and the engineering plant.

== Design ==
=== Armament ===
While the gun armament was typical for destroyers of this period, the torpedo armament of twelve 21 inch (533 mm) torpedo tubes was a significant increase over the preceding Tucker class, replacing four twin mounts with four triple mounts. Both the gun and torpedo armament would remain standard through the mass-production "flush-deck" Wickes and Clemson classes commissioned through 1921. As with the other "thousand tonners", a factor in the size of the torpedo armament was the General Board's decision to use broadside rather than centerline torpedo tubes. This was due to the desire to have some torpedoes remaining after firing a broadside, and problems experienced with centerline mounts on previous classes with torpedoes striking the gunwales of the firing ship. The Mark 8 torpedo was equipped.

This was the first US destroyer class to mount anti-aircraft guns: two 1 pounder (37 mm) autocannons. Anti-submarine (ASW) armament was added during World War I. Typically, a single depth charge track was provided aft, along with a Y-gun depth charge projector.

=== Engineering ===
While the main turbines were direct drive, all of the class were fitted with geared cruising turbines as in the preceding Tucker class, on one shaft in Allen, Wilkes and Shaw and on both shafts in the others.

== Service ==
The Sampson class served in World War I as convoy escorts in the Atlantic. Wilkes and Shaw served in the United States Coast Guard as part of the Rum Patrol 1926–34. While the other ships of the Sampson class were retired and scrapped 1934–36 to comply with the London Naval Treaty, Allen survived into the 1940s and was recommissioned on 23 August 1940; she served in the Pearl Harbor Defensive Sea Area through World War II before being decommissioned at Philadelphia in October 1945 and scrapped, the only pre-flush-deck destroyer to serve in that war.

== Ships in class ==
Ships of the Sampson destroyer class
Name	Hull no.	Shipyard	Laid down	Launched	Commissioned	Decommissioned	Fate
Sampson	DD-63	Fore River Shipbuilding	15 April 1915	4 March 1916	27 June 1916	15 June 1921	Scrapped 1936
Rowan	DD-64	Fore River Shipbuilding	10 May 1915	23 March 1916	22 August 1916	19 June 1922	Scrapped 1939
Davis	DD-65	Bath Iron Works	7 May 1915	15 August 1916	5 October 1916	20 June 1922	USCG 1926–33, scrapped 1934
Allen	DD-66	Bath Iron Works	10 May 1915	5 December 1916	24 January 1917	15 October 1945	Sold for scrap 26 September 1946
Wilkes	DD-67	William Cramp & Sons	11 March 1915	18 May 1916	10 November 1916	5 June 1922	USCG 1926–34, scrapped 1934
Shaw	DD-68	Mare Island Navy Yard	7 February 1916	9 December 1916	9 April 1917	21 June 1922	USCG 1926–33, name removed 1 November 1933 for new ship, scrapped 1934
