= United States D-class submarine =

United States Navy submarine class

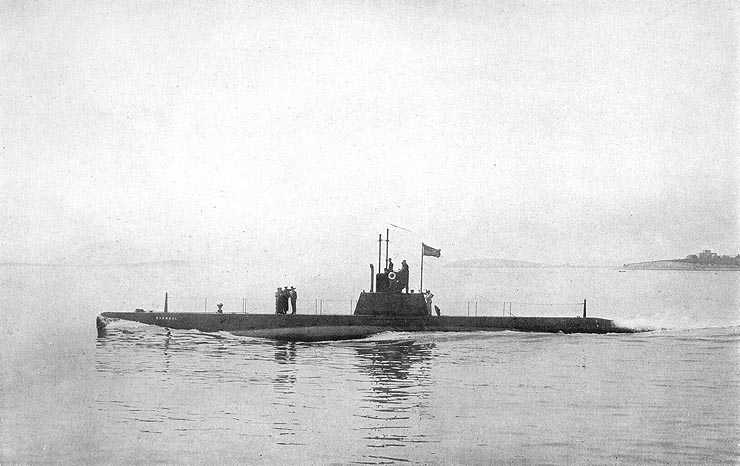
- USS Narwhal underway, c. 1909-1911

Class overview
- Name: D class
- Builders: Electric Boat (design), Fore River Shipbuilding, Quincy, Massachusetts
- Operators: United States Navy
- Preceded by: C class
- Succeeded by: E class
- Built: April 1909–September 1910
- In commission: November 1909–March 1922
- Completed: 3
- Retired: 3

General characteristics
- Type: Submarine
- Displacement: 288 long tons (293 t) surfaced; 337 long tons (342 t) submerged
- Length: 134 ft 10 in (41.10 m)
- Beam: 13 ft 11 in (4.24 m)
- Draft: 12 ft 6 in (3.81 m)
- Installed power: 600 bhp (450 kW) (gasoline); 330 hp (250 kW) (electric)
- Propulsion: 2 × Craig Shipbuilding Company gasoline engine; 2 × Electro Dynamic electric motors, 2 × 60-Cell batteries; 2 × Propeller
- Speed: 13 kn (24 km/h; 15 mph) surfaced; 9.5 kn (17.6 km/h; 10.9 mph) submerged
- Range: 1,179 nmi (2,184 km; 1,357 mi) at 9.3 knots (17.2 km/h; 10.7 mph) surfaced; 24 nmi (44 km; 28 mi) at 8 kn (15 km/h; 9.2 mph) submerged
- Test depth: 200 feet (61.0 m)
- Complement: 1 officer; 14 enlisted
- Armament: 4 × 18 inch (450 mm) bow torpedo tubes (4 torpedoes)

The United States D-class submarines were a trio of submarines built for the United States Navy in the first decade of the 20th century. All three ships served during World War I providing training for crews and officers on the US East Coast, before the class was decommissioned and sold for scrap in 1922.

== Description ==
The D-class submarines were enlarged and iterative improvements over the preceding C class. They were built by the Fore River Shipbuilding Company, of Quincy, Massachusetts, under a subcontract from the Electric Boat Company, of Groton, Connecticut.

The D-class had a length of 134 ft 10 in (41.10 m) overall, a beam of 13 ft 10 in (4.22 m) and a mean draft of 12 ft 6 in (3.81 m). They displaced 288 long tons (293 t) on the surface and 337 long tons (342 t) submerged. They had a diving depth of 200 ft (61 m). The D-class boats had a crew of 1 officer and 14 enlisted men.

For surface running, they were powered by two 300 bhp (224 kW) Electric Boat/Craig gasoline engines, each driving one propeller shaft. When submerged each shaft was driven by a 130-horsepower (97 kW) electric motor. Two 60-cell batteries provided power when submerged. They could reach 13 kn (24 km/h; 15 mph) on the surface and 9.5 kn (17.6 km/h; 10.9 mph) underwater. On the surface, the boats had a range of 1,179 nmi (2,184 km; 1,357 mi) at 9.6 kn (17.8 km/h; 11.0 mph) and 24 nmi (44 km; 28 mi) at 8 knots (15 km/h; 9.2 mph) submerged.

The boats were armed with four 18 inch (450 mm) torpedo tubes in the bow. They did not carry reloads for them. They were the first US submarines to have four forward torpedo tubes, which became the norm until the Tambor-class, which joined the fleet in 1940.

These vessels included some features intended to increase underwater speed that were standard on United States Navy (USN) submarines of this era, including a small sail and a rotating cap over the torpedo tube muzzles. For extended surface runs, the small sail was augmented with a temporary piping-and-canvas structure. This structure would be disassembled and taken below before diving. USN tactical doctrine of the time did not emphasize quick dives so this was not seen as a liability.

These were the first USN submarines internally subdivided into compartments. Narwhal and Grayling had four compartments (torpedo room, forward battery/berthing & control room, after battery/messing, and engine/motor room). Salmon was fitted with only two bulkheads leaving one large compartment in the middle that consisted of both battery wells and the control room. On Narwhal and Grayling the helm wheel was actually in the after battery compartment, as the placement of the aft control room bulkhead dictated this arrangement.

By 1918, the US involvement in World War I, and the perceived need to have submarines to support the war effort, prompted the USN to refit the rapidly obsolescing D-class submarines with diesel engines. New London Ship and Engine Company (NELSECO), Electric Boat's engine subsidiary, was fully committed in other submarine work and did not have the capacity. The Lyons-Atlas Engine Company was chosen as a sub-contractor and they built six copies of the NELSECO 120-V4FS engines at their Indianapolis, Indiana, plant. The re-engining took place at the Philadelphia Naval Shipyard, but was not completed in full until 1919. The D-class boats became the earliest USN submarines to be equipped with diesel engines, although the E-class were the first to be built with them.

== Distinguished Commanding Officers ==
Many distinguished naval officers commanded a D-class submarine early in their careers including Chester William Nimitz, Irving Reynolds Chambers, Owen Hill, Robert Henry English, and Donald Cameron Bingham.

== Boats in class ==
The following ships of the class were constructed.

Construction data
Ship name	Hull class and no.	Builder	Laid down	Launched	Comm.	Decomm.	Renamed	Rename date	Reclass. hull no.	Reclass. hull no. date	Fate
Narwhal	Submarine No. 17	Fore River Shipyard, Quincy, Massachusetts	16 April 1908	8 April 1909	23 November 1909	5 June 1922	D-1	17 November 1911	SS-17	17 July 1920	Sold for scrapping
Grayling	Submarine No. 18	Fore River Shipyard, Quincy, Massachusetts	16 April 1908	16 June 1909	23 November 1909	18 January 1922	D-2	17 November 1911	SS-18	17 July 1920	Sold for scrapping
Salmon	Submarine No. 19	Fore River Shipyard, Quincy, Massachusetts	16 April 1908	12 March 1910	8 September 1910	31 July 1922	D-3	17 November 1911	SS-19	17 July 1920	Sold for scrapping
