= USS D-2 =

D-class submarine of the United States

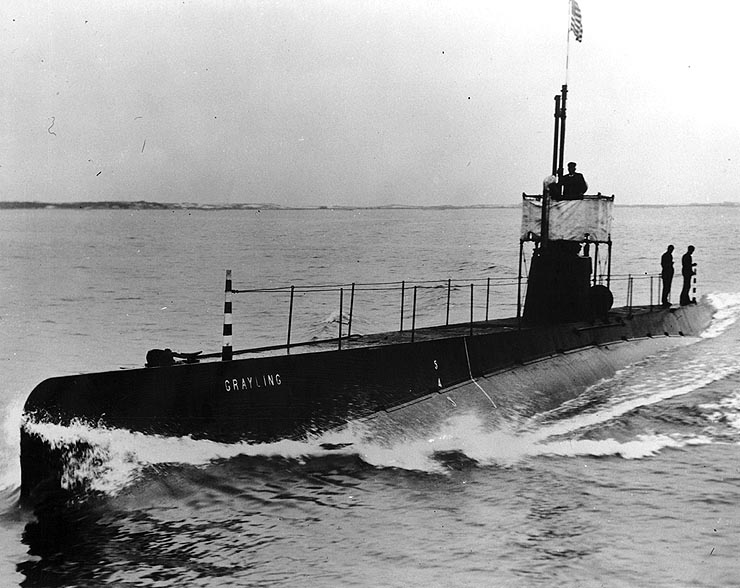
- USS Grayling, probably during builder's trials, c. 1909

History

United States
- Name: Grayling
- Namesake: The Arctic grayling
- Builder: Fore River Shipbuilding Company, Quincy, Massachusetts
- Cost: $376,100.98 (hull and machinery)
- Laid down: 16 April 1908
- Launched: 16 June 1909
- Sponsored by: Miss Catherine H. Bowles
- Commissioned: 23 November 1909
- Decommissioned: 18 January 1922
- Renamed: D-2 (Submarine No.18), 17 November 1911
- Stricken: 18 January 1922
- Identification: Hull symbol: SS-18 (17 July 1920); Call sign: NGM
- Fate: Sold for scrapping, 25 September 1922

General characteristics
- Class & type: D-class submarine
- Displacement: 288 long tons (293 t) surfaced; 337 long tons (342 t) submerged
- Length: 134 ft 10 in (41.10 m)
- Beam: 13 ft 11 in (4.24 m)
- Draft: 12 ft 6 in (3.81 m)
- Installed power: 600 bhp (450 kW) (gasoline); 330 hp (250 kW) (electric)
- Propulsion: 2 × Craig Shipbuilding Company gasoline engine; 2 × Electro Dynamic electric motors, 2 × 60-Cell batteries; 2 × Propeller
- Speed: 13 kn (24 km/h; 15 mph) surfaced; 9.5 kn (17.6 km/h; 10.9 mph) submerged
- Range: 1,179 nmi (2,184 km; 1,357 mi) at 9.3 knots (17.2 km/h; 10.7 mph) surfaced; 24 nmi (44 km; 28 mi) at 8 kn (15 km/h; 9.2 mph) submerged
- Test depth: 200 feet (61.0 m)
- Complement: 1 officer; 14 enlisted
- Armament: 4 × 18 inch (450 mm) bow torpedo tubes (4 torpedoes)

USS Grayling/D-2 (SS-18), also known as "Submarine No. 18", was one of three D-class submarines built for the United States Navy (USN) in the first decade of the 20th century. She was the first ship of the USN to be named for the Arctic grayling, a fresh-water game fish closely related to the trout

== Design ==
The D-class submarines were enlarged versions of the preceding C class, the first American submarines armed with four torpedo tubes. They had a length of 134 ft 10 in (41.10 m) overall, a beam of 13 ft 10 in (4.22 m) and a mean draft of 12 ft 6 in (3.81 m). They displaced 288 long tons (293 t) on the surface and 337 long tons (342 t) submerged. The D-class boats had a crew of 1 officer and 14 enlisted men. They had a diving depth of 200 ft (61 m).

For surface running, they were powered by two 300-brake-horsepower (224 kW) gasoline engines, each driving one propeller shaft. When submerged each propeller was driven by a 165-horsepower (123 kW) electric motor. They could reach 13 kn (24 km/h; 15 mph) on the surface and 9.5 kn (17.6 km/h; 10.9 mph) underwater. On the surface, the boats had a range of 1,179 nmi (2,184 km; 1,357 mi) at 9.6 kn (17.8 km/h; 11.0 mph) and 24 nmi (44 km; 28 mi) at 8 kn (15 km/h; 9.2 mph) submerged.

The boats were armed with four 18-inch (450 mm) torpedo tubes in the bow. They did not carry reloads for them.

== Construction ==
Grayling's keel was laid down by Fore River Shipbuilding Company, in Quincy, Massachusetts, under a subcontract from Electric Boat Company, of Groton, Connecticut. Grayling was launched on 16 June 1909, sponsored by Miss Catherine H. Bowles, daughter of Francis T. Bowles, President, and former US Navy Rear Admiral, of the Fore River Shipbuilding Company. She was commissioned on 23 November 1909.

== Service history ==
Grayling joined the Atlantic Torpedo Fleet as Flagboat for Submarine Division 3 (SubDiv 3). Along the United States East Coast, Grayling joined in diving, torpedo, and experimental exercises. She was renamed D-2 on 17 November 1911. She participated in the Presidential Review of the Fleet in the North River at New York City from 5 to 18 May 1915.

While patrolling outside Naval Station Newport, Rhode Island, just 3 nmi (5.6 km; 3.5 mi) east of Point Judith, shortly before 14:00 on 7 October 1916, D-2 discovered the Imperial German Navy submarine U-53 under the command of Hans Rose, heading towards Newport, Rhode Island, as part of her hitherto unprecedented two-way traversal of the Atlantic Ocean without refueling or resupply. The United States was still neutral in World War I, but there was an initial flurry of activity when U-53 suddenly steamed away to port believing the submerged D-2 to be a British submarine, but when D-2 surfaced so that a crewman could run aft to raise the United States flag, U-53 slowed. Lieutenant G. C. Fulker, commanding officer of D-2, brought his submarine up close to U-53 on a parallel course to escort U-53 while in sight of land. As the submarines reached the Brenton Reef Lightship, Rose requested permission from D-2 to enter port at Newport. Fulker granted it, and Rose called back by megaphone, "I salute our American comrades and follow in your wake."

After the United States entered World War I, on the side of the Allies, on 6 April 1917, D-2 served in training and experimental work at New London, Connecticut. On 31 July 1917, or 1 August 1917, she sank the schooner Charlotte W. Miller in a collision near Bartletts Reef, near New London; Charlotte W. Miller later was raised but declared a total loss. On 14 September 1917, D-2 sank at pierside with all hands aboard. Her entire crew was rescued and she was refloated, repaired, and returned to service.

== Fate ==
D-2 was placed in commission, in reserve, at the Philadelphia Navy Yard, in Philadelphia, Pennsylvania, on 9 September 1919, and placed in ordinary, on 15 July 1921. She was decommissioned, on 18 January 1922, and sold as a hulk, on 25 September 1922.

== Sources ==
- "Table 21 - Ships on Navy List June 30, 1919". Congressional Serial Set. U.S. Government Printing Office: 764. 1921.
- Gary, Priolo. "Grayling / D-2 (SS-18)". Navsource.net.
- Cressman, Robert J. (12 May 2021). "Grayling I (Submarine No. 18)". Dictionary of American Naval Fighting Ships. Navy Department, Naval History and Heritage Command. This article incorporates text from this source, which is in the public domain.
- Friedman, Norman (1995). U.S. Submarines Through 1945: An Illustrated Design History. Annapolis, Maryland: Naval Institute Press. ISBN 1-55750-263-3.
- Gardiner, Robert & Gray, Randal, eds. (1985). Conway's All the World's Fighting Ships 1906–1921. Annapolis, Maryland: Naval Institute Press. ISBN 0-85177-245-5.
- Herzog, Bodo; Schomaekers, Günter (1965). Ritter der Tiefe Graue Wölfe, Die erfolgreichsten U-Boot-Kommandanten der Welt des Ersten un Zweiten Weltkrieges (in German). Munich-Wels: Verlag Welsermühl\. p. 178–179.
- "Schooner Charlotte W. Miller sinking in Long Island Sound off New London". connecticuthistoryillustrated.org. Archived from the original on 16 April 2021.
- "Records of the T. A. Scott co". mysticseaport.org. 20 May 2016. Archived from the original on 16 April 2021.
