= History of the United States Coast Guard Auxiliary =

National Commodore
| Number | National Commodore | Years |
| 1 | NACO Bert C. Pouncey, Jr. | 1951–1952 |
| 2 | NACO Alexander S. Bauer | 1953–1954 |
| 3 | NACO J. Webb L. Sheehy | 1955 |
| 4 | NACO John Brent Tanner | 1956–1957 |
| 5 | NACO Charles S. Greanoff | 1958–1959 |
| 6 | NACO Bliss Woodward | 1960–1961 |
| 7 | NACO Homer L. Byers | 1962–1963 |
| 8 | NACO Elsworth A. Weinberg | 1964–1965 |
| 9 | NACO Grover A. Miller, Jr. | 1967–1968 |
| 10 | NACO John B. Stone | 1969–1970 |
| 11 | NACO Harry S. Osbourn | 1971–1972 |
| 12 | NACO Harold B. Haney | 1973–1974 |
| 13 | NACO Anderson A. Cordill | 1975–1976 |
| 14 | NACO J. Kevin Mitchell | 1977–1978 |
| 15 | NACO Dr. Robert L. Horton | 1979–1980 |
| 16 | NACO Aime R. Bernard | 1981–1982 |
| 17 | NACO Martin S. Herz | 1983–1984 |
| 18 | NACO Christopher G. Lagen | 1985–1986 |
| 19 | NACO Will C. "Papa" Harr | 1987–1988 |
| 20 | NACO Henry G. Pratt, III | 1989–1990 |
| 21 | NACO Stanley Y. Kennedy | 1991–1992 |
| 22 | NACO Joseph J. Lanz, Jr. | 1993–1994 |
| 23 | NACO Peter W. Melera | 1995–1996 |
| 24 | NACO Everette L. Tucker, Jr. | 1997–2000 |
| 25 | NACO Viggo C. Bartelsen | 2001–2002 |
| 26 | NACO E.W. Edgerton | 2003–2004 |
| 27 | NACO Gene M. Seibert | 2005–2006 |
| 28 | NACO Steven M. Budar | 2007–2008 |
| 29 | NACO Nicholas Kerigan | 2009–2010 |
| 30 | NACO Jim Vass | 2010–2012 |
| 31 | NACO Thomas C. Mallison | 2012-2014 |
| 32 | NACO Mark Simoni | 2014-2016 |
| 33 | NACO Richard A. Washburn | 2016–2018 |
| 34 | NACO Larry L. King | 2018–Present |

The history of the United States Coast Guard Auxiliary began in 1939. From its formation, the United States Coast Guard Auxiliary has been supporting the United States Coast Guard. The Auxiliary works within the Coast Guard in carrying out its noncombatant and non-law enforcement missions.

== Founding ==
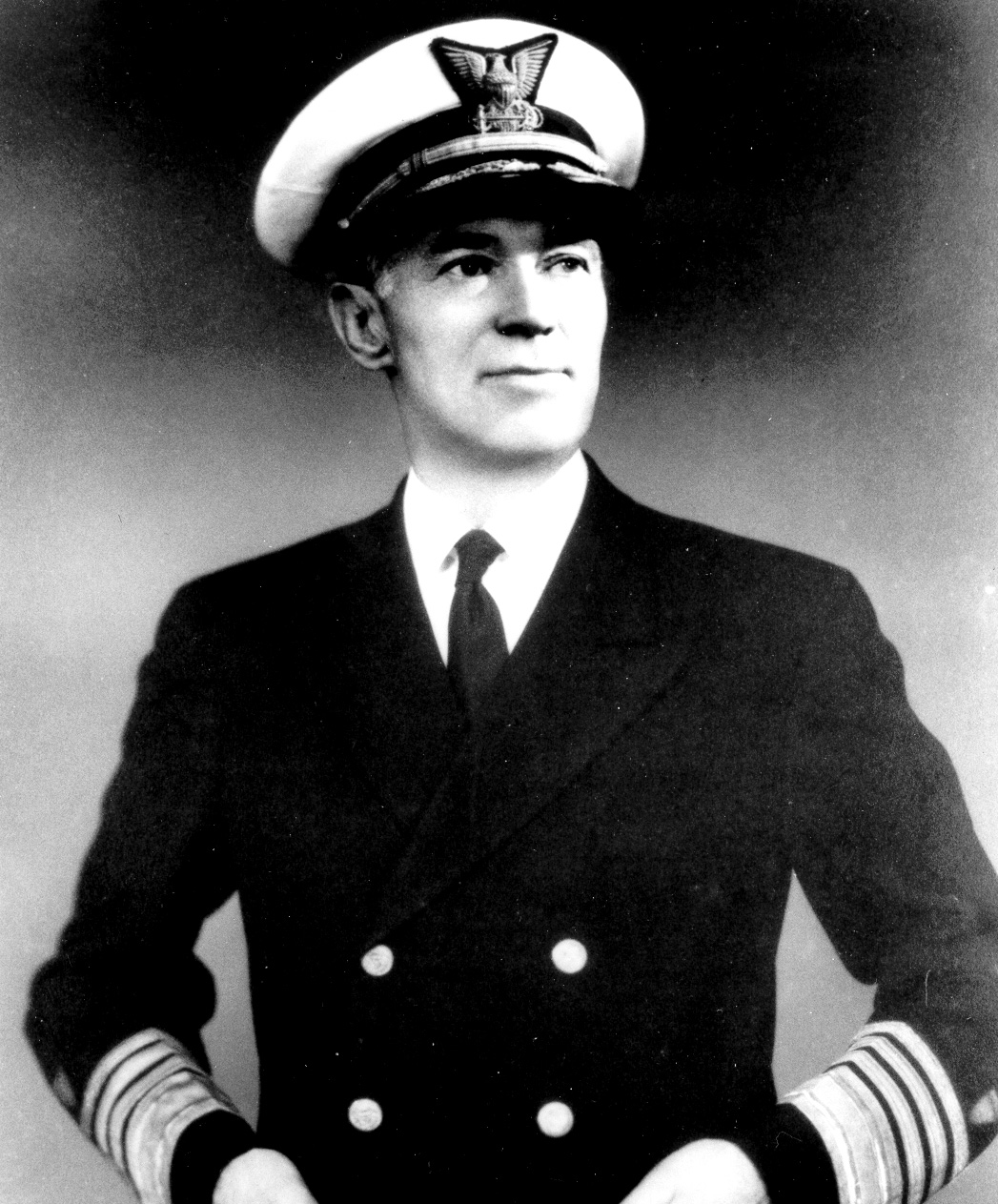
Commandant Russell Waesche is credited as the founder.

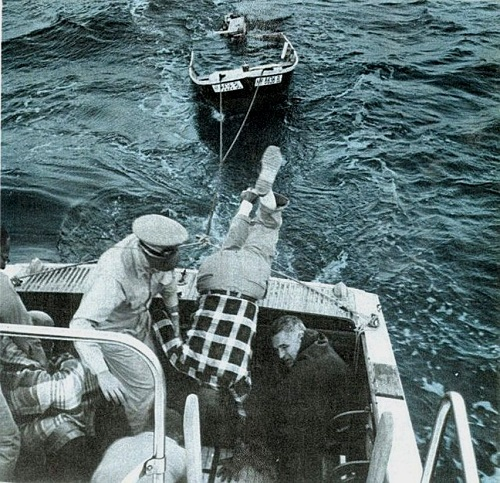
Auxiliarists in 1967 rescuing a boater off an outboard that had foundered during a storm in Long Island Sound, New York.

The development of the single-operator motorboat, and later the outboard engine, during the early 20th century increased the number of recreational boaters operating on federal waters. By 1939 there were more than 300,000 personal watercraft in operation. The previous year the United States Coast Guard had received 14,000 calls for assistance and had responded to 8,600 "in-peril" cases. Commandant Russell Waesche is credited as the founder.

Until 1939, the Coast Guard lacked an organized reserve force. The Coast Guard Reserve Act of 1939 created the United States Coast Guard Reserve as a civilian reserve force that would have four specified responsibilities. They were charged with promoting safety at sea, increasing boater efficiency for citizens of the United States, assisting them with laws and compliance, and supporting Active Duty members of the Coast Guard. Boat Owners were organized into flotillas within Coast Guard districts around the United States. They conducted safety and security patrols and helped enforce the 1940 Federal Boating and Espionage Acts.

In 1941 Congress passed a law to restructure the Coast Guard Reserve which was created just two years earlier. The Coast Guard would hence forth have two reserve forces. The existing civilian organization would be renamed the United States Coast Guard Auxiliary. In addition, the United States Coast Guard Reserve was created that year and would have military and law enforcement responsibilities.

=== During World War II ===
During World War II many Auxiliarists became temporary members of the Coast Guard Reserve. The temporary members brought their boats which would be used for safety patrols. Coast Guard Headquarters allowed some of those boats to be equipped with machine guns and they could carry pistols and rifles on patrols. In 1941 the Coast Guard, Coast Guard Reserve, and Coast Guard Auxiliary was transferred from the United States Treasury Department to the United States Department of the Navy and in 1942 the Coast Guard Auxiliary was authorized to wear uniforms.

During the war Auxiliarists would help the Coast Guard with recruiting and training active duty personnel. Beginning in 1942, in response to the growing Nazi German U-boat threat to the United States, the U.S. Navy ordered the acquisition of the "maximum practical number of civilian craft in any way capable of going to sea in good weather for a period of at least 48 hours." A large number of vessels, owned and piloted by Auxiliarists with crews made-up of Coast Guard reservists, made-up the bulk of the American coastal anti-submarine warfare capability during the early months of World War II. As newly constructed warships took over the load, the Coast Guard abandoned the concept. None of the two thousand civilian craft, armed with depth charges stowed on their decks, ever sank a submarine, though they did rescue several hundred survivors of torpedoed merchant ships. From 1942 through the rest of the war Auxiliarists and Coast Guard reservists served on local Port Security Forces to protect the shipping industry.

== Post World War II Activities ==
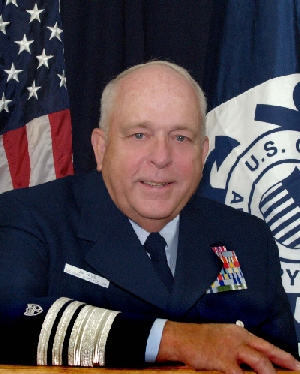
30th National Commodore, Commodore Jim Vass

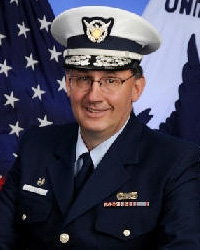
32nd National Commodore, Commodore Mark Simoni

In 1950 National Commodore Bert Pouncey was elected and the National Board for the Coast Guard Auxiliary was established. In 1955 Auiliarists started to participate in programs to support the recruitment of potential candidates for the United States Coast Guard Academy.

The North American Boating Campaign was originally known as "Safe Boating Week," observed by the Coast Guard Auxiliary as a Courtesy Examination weekend in Amesburg, Massachusetts in June 1952. This tradition continued until 1957 when an official National Safe Boating Week observation took place sponsored by the United States Coast Guard Auxiliary in various parts of the country. As a result, the U.S. Coast Guard prepared a Resolution, and on June 4, 1958, President Dwight D. Eisenhower signed PL 85-445, to establish National Safe Boating Week as the first week starting on the first Sunday in June.

Early in 1973, budget cuts forced the closing of seven Coast Guard stations on the Great Lakes. At the request of the affected communities, Congress ordered the stations to be re-opened and operated by the Auxiliary. The local division captains took responsibility for manning them and ensuring that Auxiliarists' boats were always available to assist distressed vessels. The Auxiliary later took over seven more stations on the Mississippi and Ohio Rivers.

In 1976 the Coast Guard commissioned a study of the Auxiliary by a private research firm, University Sciences Forum of Washington. After interviewing key personnel in the Coast Guard and the Auxiliary and analyzing questionnaires filled out by about two thousand Auxiliarists, the researchers concluded that the Auxiliary was in good health. "In summary," they wrote, "we consider the Auxiliary the greatest economical resource readily available to the COGARD. It performs in an outstanding manner and its personnel are among the most professional group of volunteers in the nation."

In April 1980, the government of Cuba began to allow any person who wanted to leave Cuba to assemble in Mariel Harbor and take their own transport. The U.S. Coast Guard, working out of Seventh District Headquarters in Miami, Florida, rescued boats in difficulty, inspected vessels for adequate safety equipment, and processed refugees. The Auxiliary was heavily involved in assisting with this effort.

== Enhanced role ==
Prior to 1997, Auxiliarists were largely limited to activities supporting recreational boating safety. In 1997, however, new legislation authorized the Auxiliary to participate in any and all Coast Guard missions except direct military and direct law enforcement. Auxiliarists may directly augment active duty Coast Guard personnel in non-combat, non-law enforcement roles (e.g. radio communications watch stander, interpreter, cook, etc.) and may assist active duty personnel in inspecting commercial vessels and maintaining aids-to-navigation. Auxiliarists may support the law enforcement and homeland security missions of the Coast Guard but may not directly participate (make arrests, etc.), and Auxiliarists are not permitted to carry a weapon while serving in any Auxiliary capacity.

== Under the Department of Homeland Security ==
In 2003 the Coast Guard, Coast Guard Reserve and Auxiliary were realigned to be under the United States Department of Homeland Security. As of 2004, the Coast Guard Auxiliary had 35,000 members who collectively provided 2 million man hours of service annually.

=== Recognition ===
In May 2006, at the Change of Command ceremony when Admiral Thad Allen took over as Commandant, President George W. Bush awarded the entire Coast Guard, including the Coast Guard Auxiliary, the Coast Guard Presidential Unit Citation with hurricane device, for its efforts during and after Hurricane Katrina and Tropical Storm Rita.

On June 19, 2009, the Commandant of the Coast Guard awarded the Coast Guard Unit Commendation to Auxiliary members for "performance...nothing short of stellar" from the period of June 24, 1999, to June 23, 2009.

On the 75th anniversary of the USCG Auxiliary, June 23, 2014, the Commandant awarded another Coast Guard Unit Commendation ribbon to all Auxiliarists.

On the 80th anniversary of the USCG Auxiliary, On May 16, 2019, the US Coast Guard Auxiliary was awarded a third Coast Guard Unit Commendation ribbon to all Auxiliarists by Karl Schultz the Commandant of the Coast Guard.

Today there are over 30,000 auxiliarists (men and women) who provide millions of hours in support of Coast Guard missions. The auxiliary has been assigned by the Commandant the primary responsibility for many recreational boating safety tasks, including public boating safety education and voluntary Vessel Safety Checks (formerly called Courtesy Examinations). Additionally, Auxiliarists use their own vessels boats and aircraft (once registered as Coast Guard facilities) to conduct safety patrols, aid in search and rescue missions, and perform other tasks on behalf of the Coast Guard. A complete timeline of historical events for the Coast Guard Auxiliary can be found at this link

=== Modern photos of the auxiliary ===
Coast Guard Auxiliary in Alaska in 2013

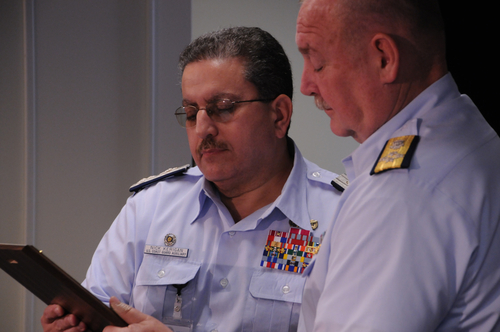
Auxiliary 70th anniversary picture 2009

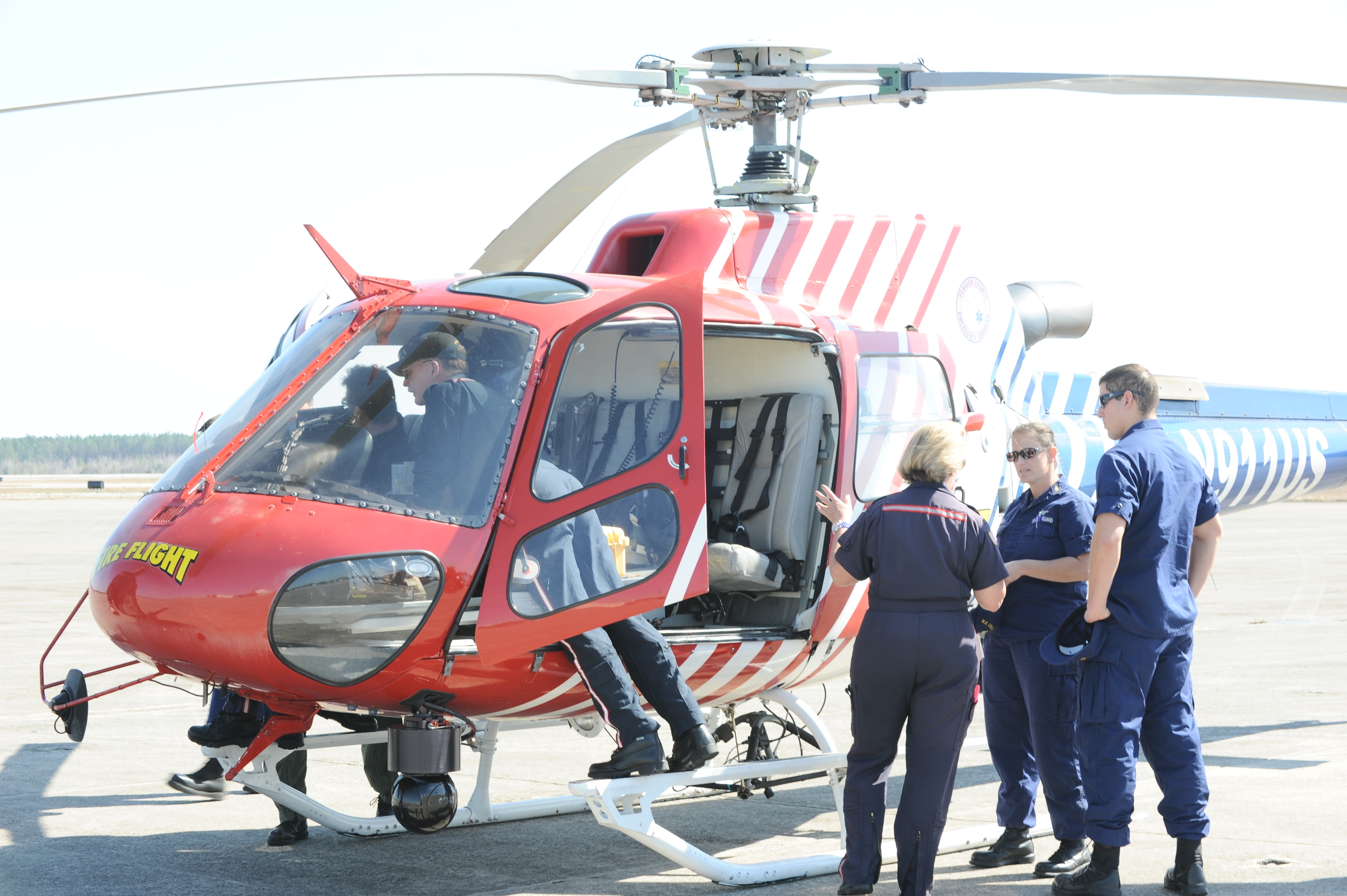
Picture of the Auxiliary augmenting the Coast Guard in 2014

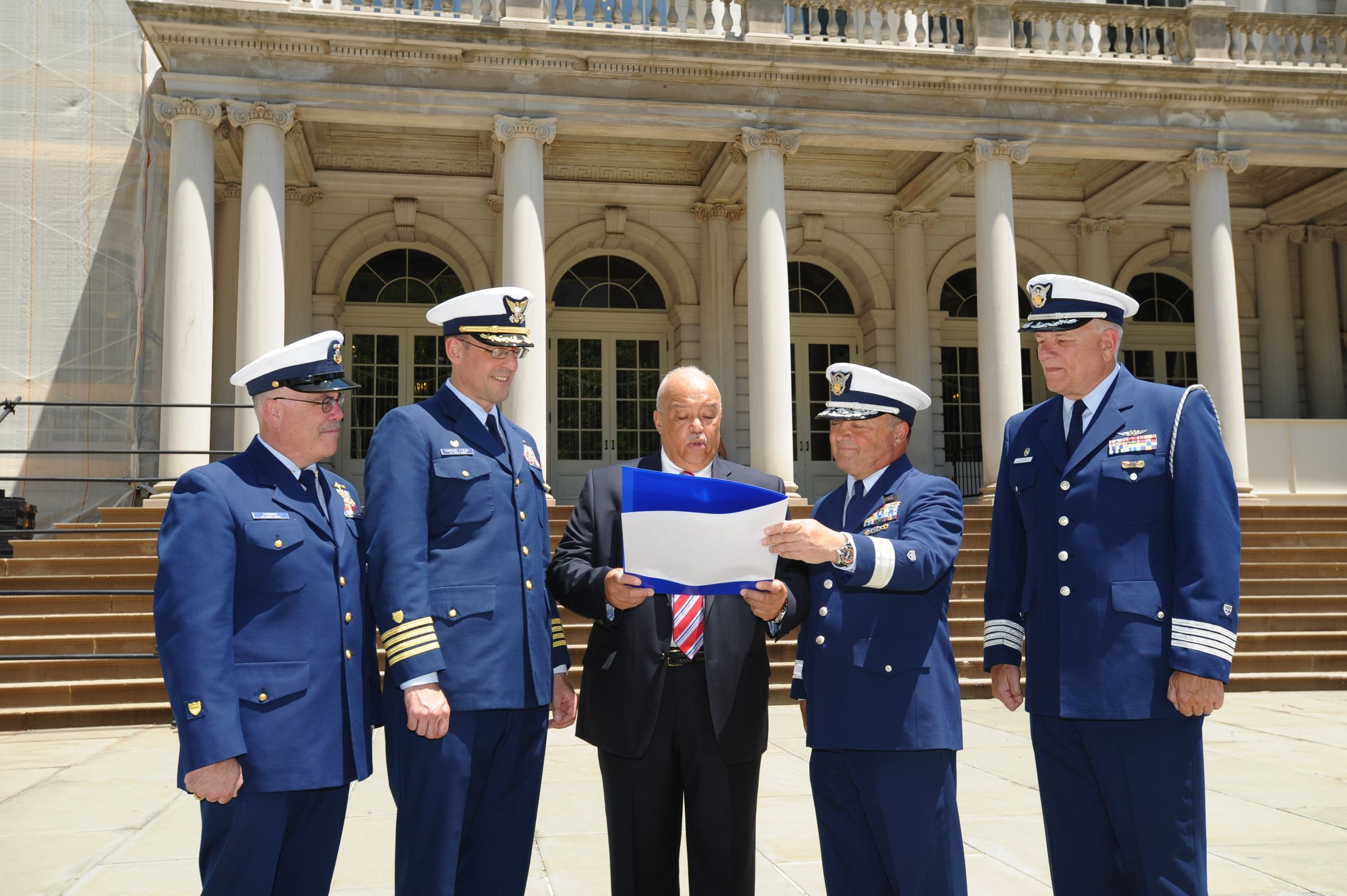
With the New York Mayor's office in 2014

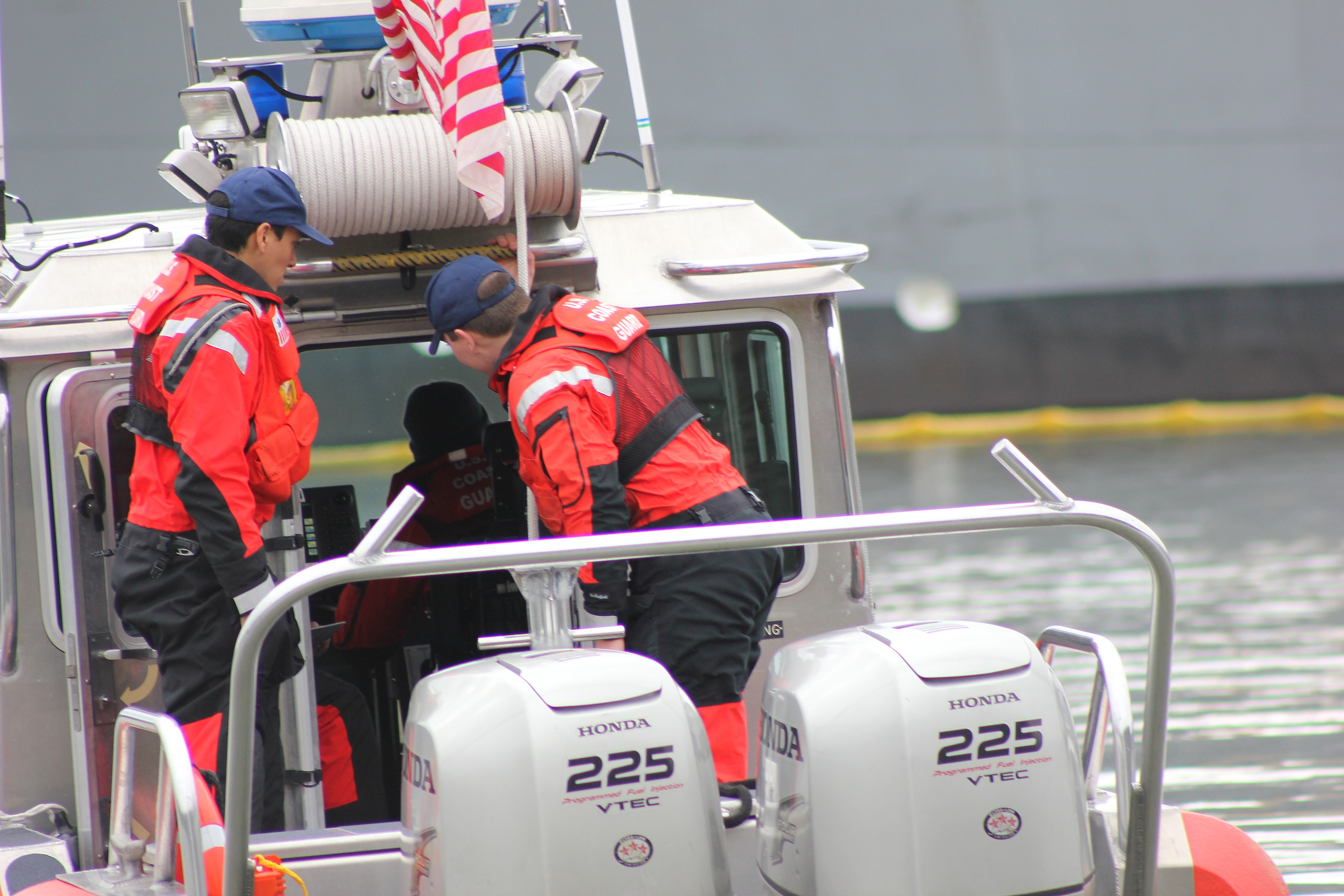
Auxiliary member in training in 2012

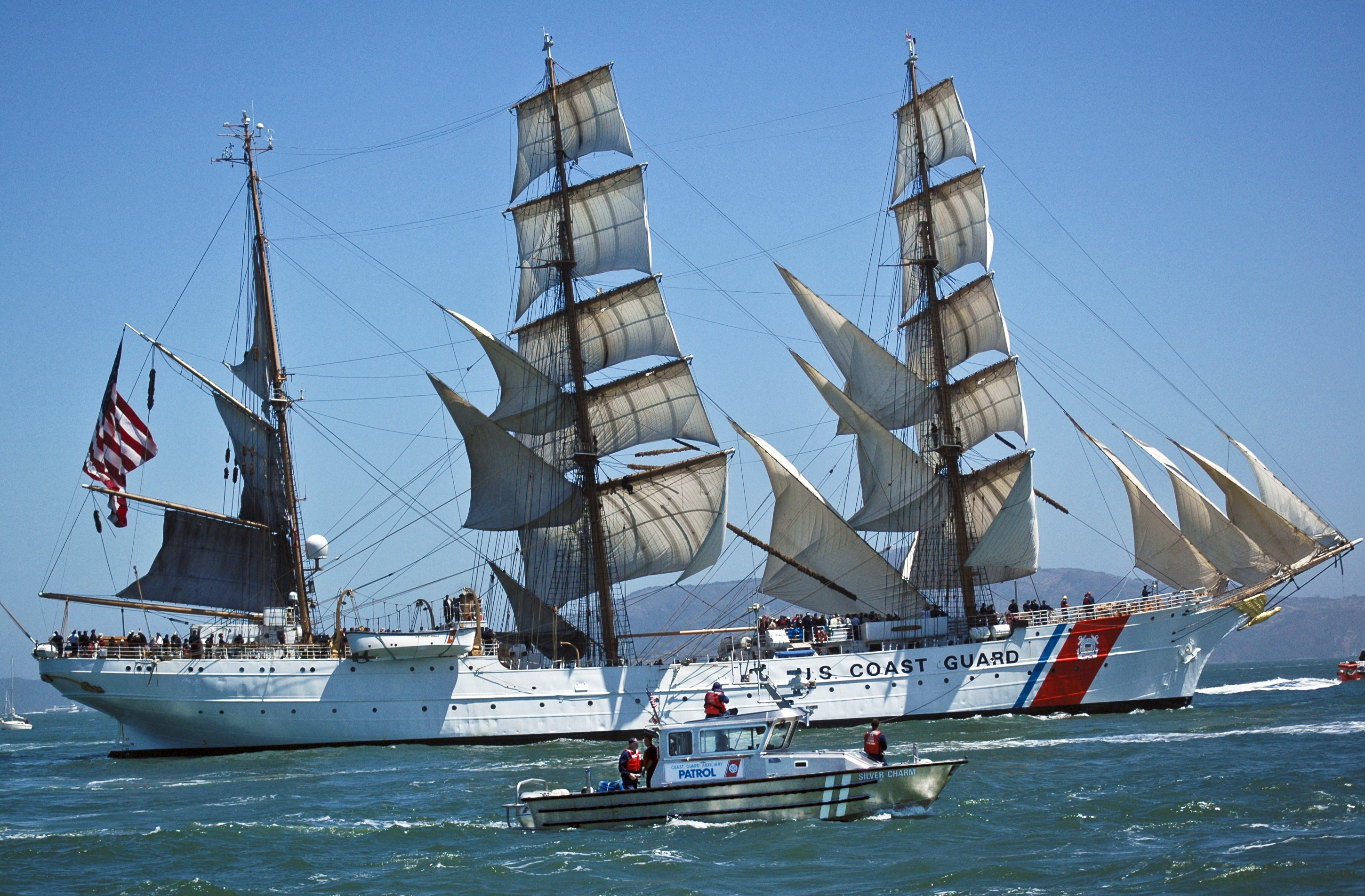
2008 picture of an Auxiliary boat crew

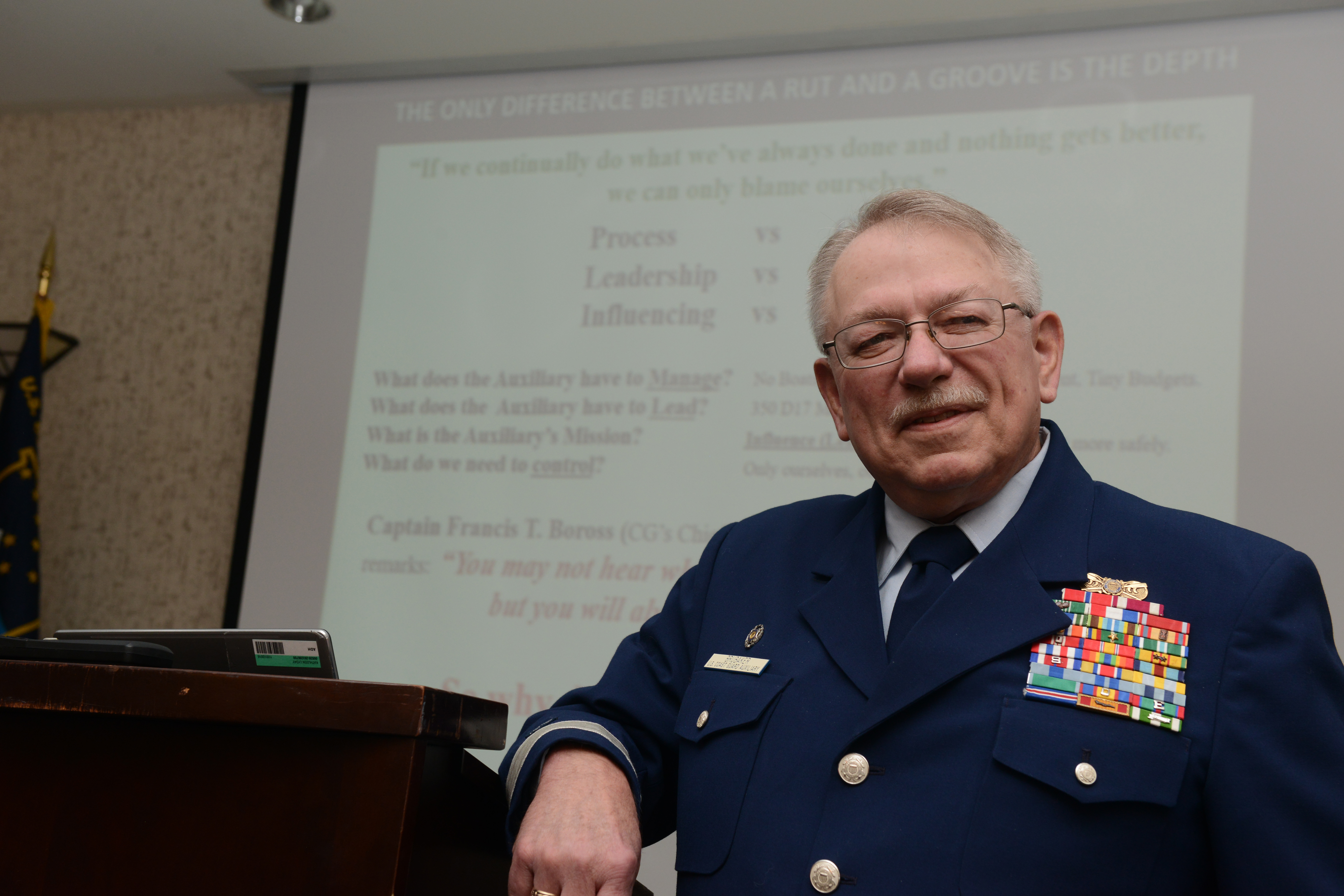
At a strategic planning meeting in 2017

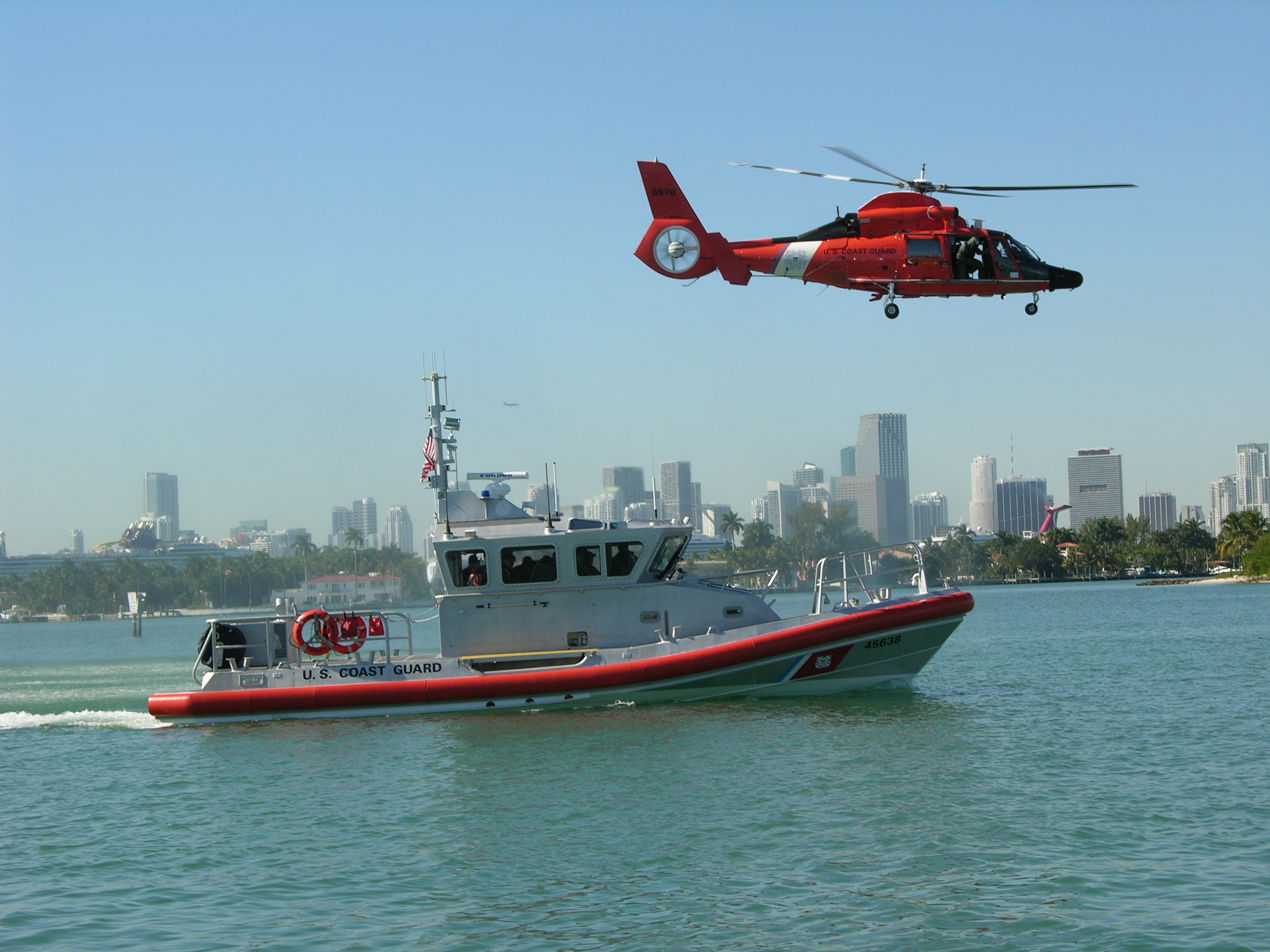
Auxiliary Public Affairs detachment from 2010

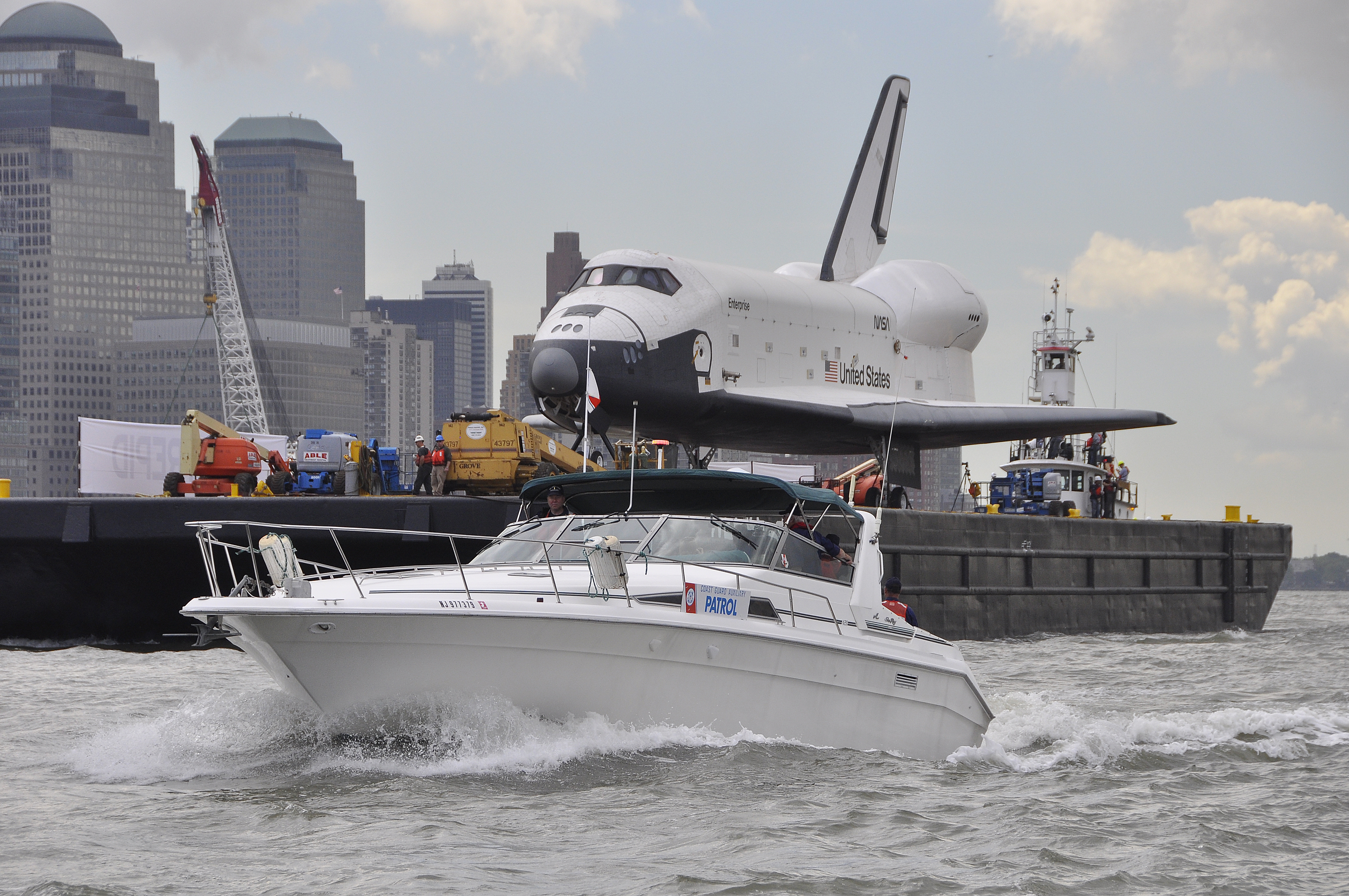
Coast Guard Auxiliary Patrol escorts Space Shuttle Enterprise

U.S. Coast Guard Auxiliary member translating for U.S. Marine Corps.

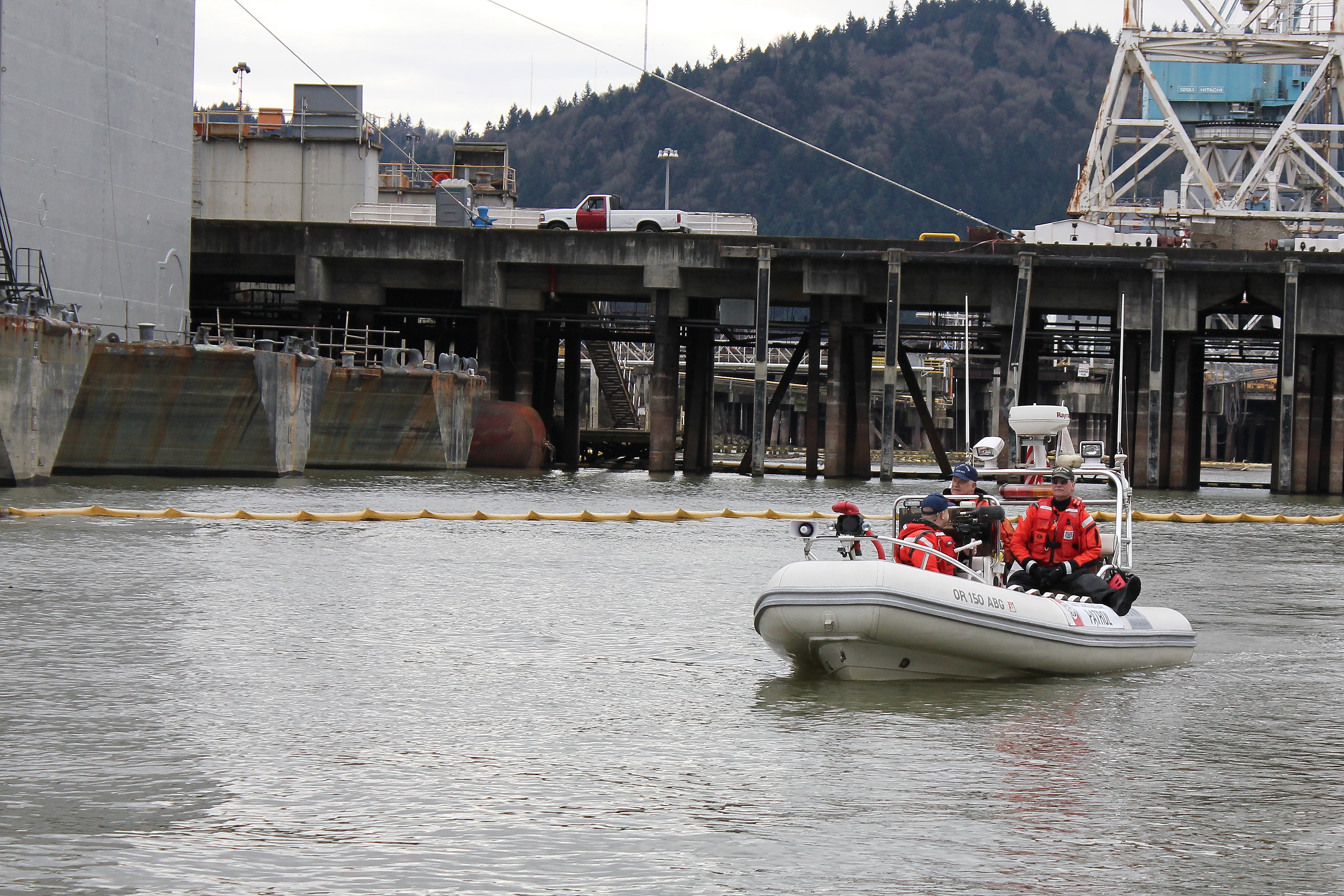
Auxiliarists train on the water

Members of the U.S. Coast Guard and Coast Guard Auxiliary march in a Memorial Day parade in Chicago

== See also ==
- Commandant of the Coast Guard
- United States Coast Guard
- United States Coast Guard Reserve
- Uniforms of the United States Coast Guard Auxiliary
- Badges of the United States Coast Guard
- United States Department of Homeland Security
- Naval militia
- North American Safe Boating Campaign
