= William R. Rush =

United States Navy Medal of Honor and Navy Cross recipient

William Rees Rush
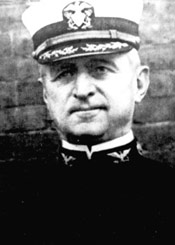
- Captain William Rush
- Born: September 19, 1857; Philadelphia, Pennsylvania, US
- Died: August 2, 1940 (aged 82); Pallanza, Italy
- Military career
- Allegiance: United States
- Branch: United States Navy
- Service years: 1877–1916, 1917–1919
- Rank: Captain
- Commands: USS Marietta; Cavite Navy Yard; USS Wilmington; USS Nantucket; USS Missouri (BB-11); USS Connecticut (BB-18); USS Hancock (AP-3); USS Washington (ACR-11); USS Florida (BB-30); First Division, United States Fleet; Boston Navy Yard
- Conflicts: Spanish–American War; *Battle of Santiago de Cuba; U.S. occupation of Veracruz, 1914; World War I
- Awards: Medal of Honor; Navy Cross; Distinguished Service Medal

William Rees Rush (1857–1940) was an officer in the United States Navy during the Spanish–American War, the 1914 United States occupation of Veracruz, and World War I, and was a recipient of the Medal of Honor and the Navy Cross.

== Biography ==
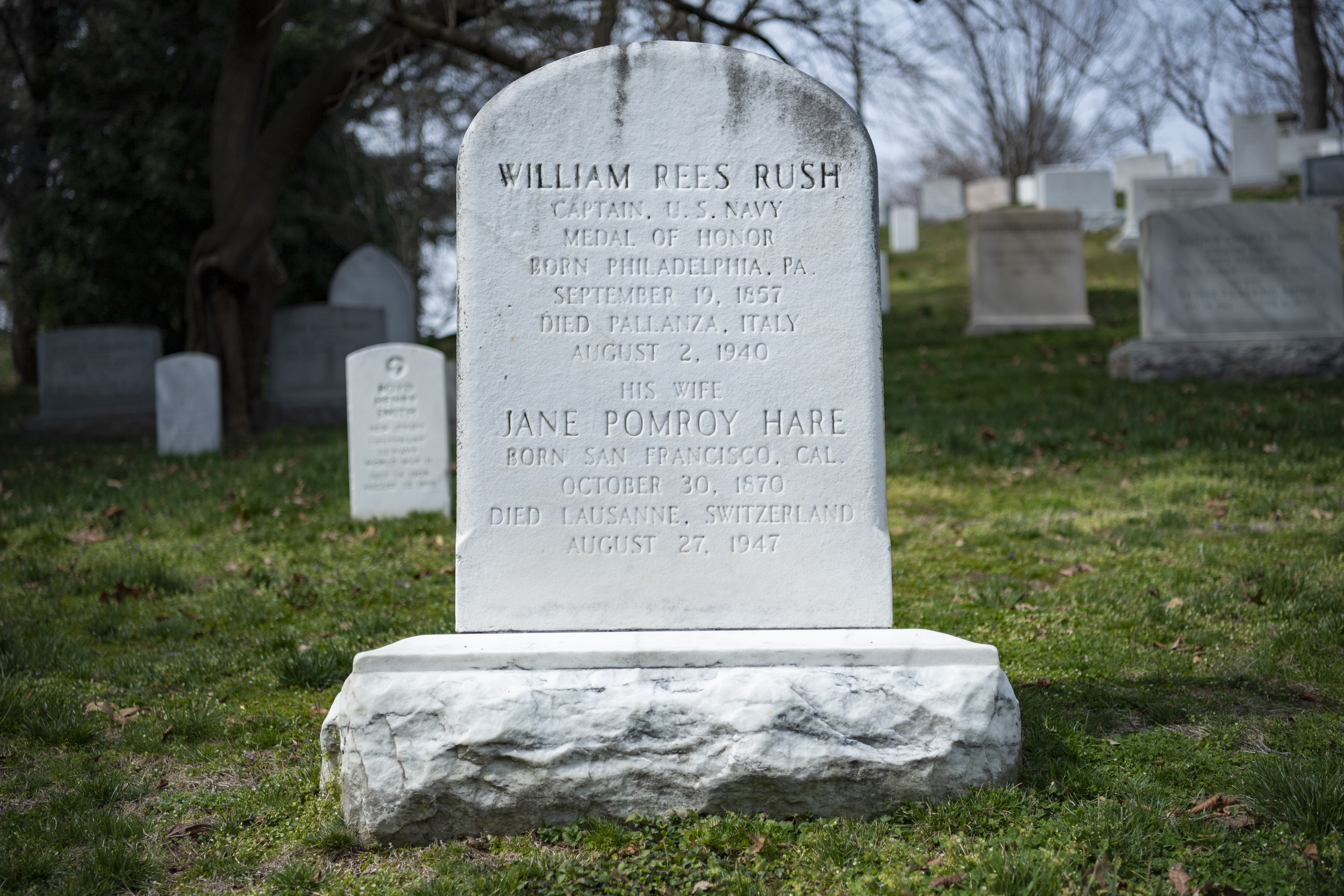
Grave at Arlington National Cemetery

=== Early career ===
William Rees Rush was born in Philadelphia, Pennsylvania, on September 19, 1857. He took the oath of office as a midshipman on June 6, 1872, graduated from the United States Naval Academy on June 20, 1877, and was commissioned ensign on October 15, 1881. Between that time and the outbreak of the Spanish–American War in April 1898, Rush served in the gunboats USS Nantucket and USS Bennington, the protected cruiser USS Boston, and the research ship USS Albatross. He also received instruction in ordnance at the Washington Navy Yard in Washington, D.C., worked in the Navy Hydrographic Office, completed the course of instruction at the Naval Torpedo Station at Newport, Rhode Island, and attended the Naval War College at Newport.

=== Spanish–American War ===
During the Spanish–American War in 1898, Rush served as a turret division commander in the armored cruiser USS Brooklyn, the flagship of Rear Admiral Winfield S. Schley's Flying Squadron during blockade operations off Cienfuegos, Cuba, and participated in the Battle of Santiago de Cuba on July 3, 1898.

=== Service, 1899–1914 ===
Detached from Brooklyn in October 1899, Rush went to sea in the battleship USS Massachusetts (BB-2) as executive officer. He later commanded the gunboat USS Marietta and served as executive officer in the protected cruiser USS Albany.

In the ensuing years, Rush again alternated tours of duty afloat with assignments ashore. He served at the Boston Navy Yard in Boston, Massachusetts, in the equipment department and at the Naval War College and travelled to the Philippines where he became captain of Cavite Navy Yard in February 1906. In June 1907, he assumed command of the gunboat USS Wilmington, the first of a series of successive sea commands that included Ranger, battleships USS Missouri (BB-11) and USS Connecticut (BB-18), troop transport USS Hancock (AP-3), armored cruiser USS Washington (ACR-11), and battleship USS Florida (BB-30), and the First Division of the United States Fleet.

==== Medal of Honor at Veracruz ====
While commanding Florida, Rush was given command of the landing party at Veracruz, Mexico. The landings there on 21 April 1914, were at the height of a diplomatic crisis between Mexico and the United States. Rush and his men met heavy resistance, Rush was wounded in the early fighting, but continued to direct the efforts of his brigade.

For his conduct during the Veracruz landings, Captain Rush received the Medal of Honor. His citation took note of the fact that he was required to be at points of great danger in directing the officers and men of the brigade and that in doing so he exhibited "conspicuous courage, coolness, and skill." "His responsibilities were great," the citation continued, "and he met them in a manner worthy of commendation."

=== Boston Navy Yard and World War I service ===
Rush took command of the Boston Navy Yard on November 6, 1914, a post he held until he requested retirement on October 9, 1916. With the onset of World War I in April 1917, however, Rush was recalled to active duty and was awarded the Navy Cross for "exceptionally meritorious services in a duty of great responsibility" as commandant of the Boston Navy Yard during World War I.

=== Retirement and later life ===
Relieved of all active duty on July 25, 1919, Rush subsequently lived in retirement in Italy. He died at Pallanza, Italy, on October 2, 1940.

== Namesakes ==
During World War II, the U.S. Navy destroyer escort USS William R. Rush (DE-288) was named for Captain Rush. Her construction was cancelled in March 1944.

The destroyer escort USS William R. Rush (DE-556) then was named for Rush. Her construction was cancelled in June 1944.

The destroyer USS William R. Rush (DD-714), in commission from 1945 to 1978, was named in his honor.

== Medal of Honor citation ==
Rank and organization: Captain, U.S. Navy. Born: September 19, 1857, Philadelphia, Pa. Accredited to: Pennsylvania. G.O. No.: 177, December 4, 1915. Other Navy award: Distinguished Service Medal.

Citation:

For distinguished conduct in battle, engagements of Vera Cruz, 21 and April 22, 1914. In command of the naval brigade, Capt. Rush was in both days' fighting and almost continually under fire from soon after landing, about noon on the 21st, until we were in possession of the city, about noon of the 22d. His duties required him to be at points of great danger in directing his officers and men, and he exhibited conspicuous courage, coolness and skill in his conduct of the fighting. Upon his courage and skill depended in great measure success or failure. His responsibilities were great, and he met them in a manner worthy of commendation.

== See also ==
- List of Medal of Honor recipients (Veracruz)
