= USS William R. Rush (DD-714) =

Gearing-class destroyer

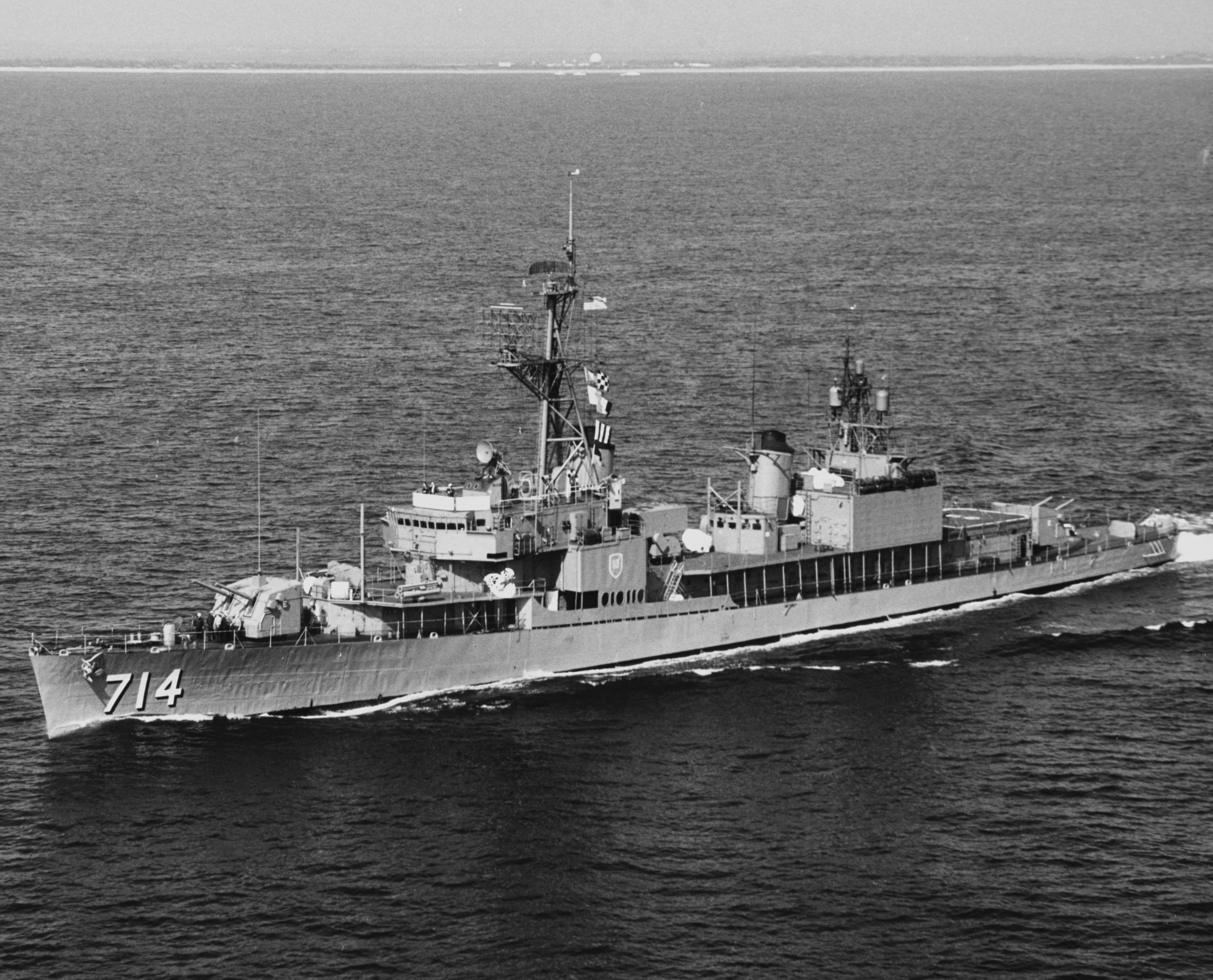
- USS William R. Rush on 4 May 1965

History

United States
- Name: William R. Rush
- Namesake: William R. Rush
- Builder: Federal Shipbuilding and Drydock Company
- Laid down: 19 October 1944
- Launched: 8 July 1945
- Commissioned: 21 September 1945
- Decommissioned: 21 December 1951
- Recommissioned: 3 September 1952
- Modernized: 30 April 1965 (FRAM IB)
- Decommissioned: 1 July 1978
- Reclassified: DDR-714, 18 July 1952; DD-714, 1 July 1964
- Stricken: 1 July 1978
- Identification: Callsign: NTGE; Hull number: DD-714
- Fate: Transferred to South Korea, 1978
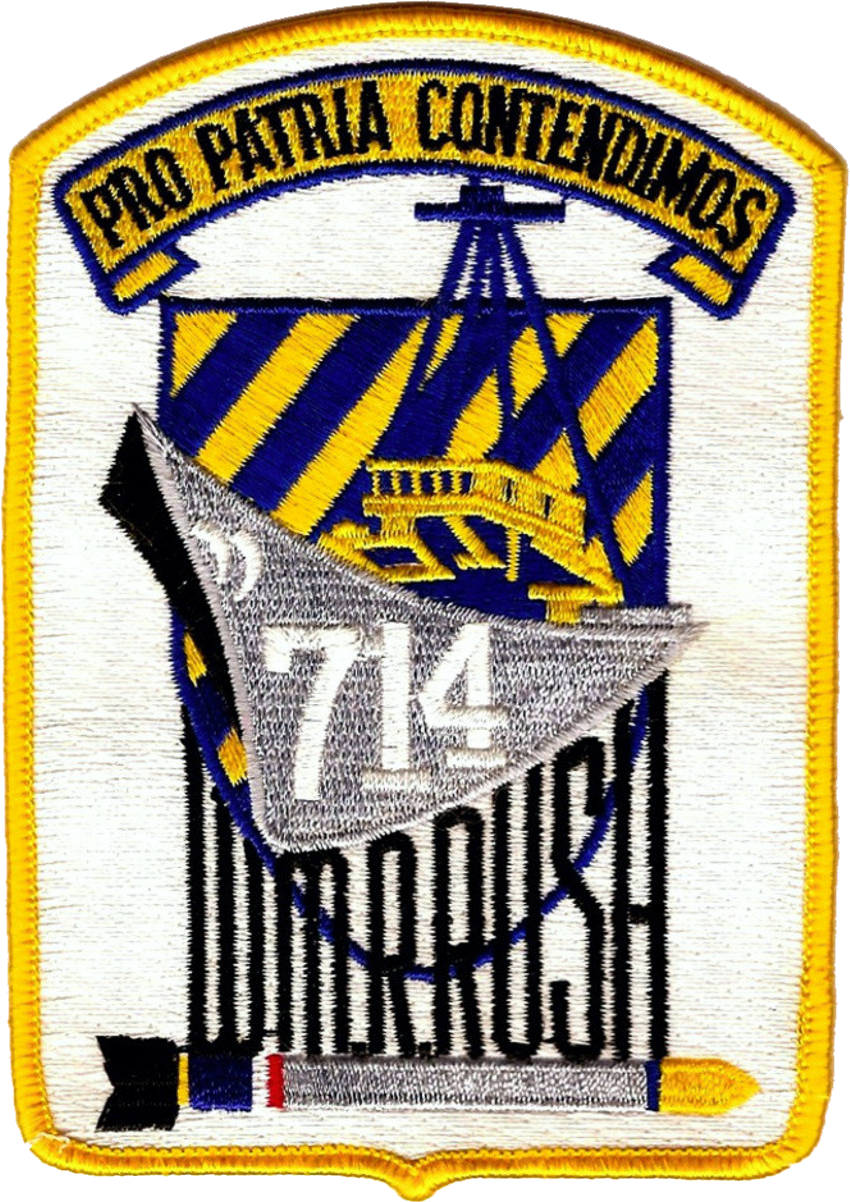
- Badge

South Korea
- Name: Gangwon; (강원)
- Namesake: Gangwon
- Acquired: 1978
- Commissioned: 1978
- Decommissioned: 2000
- Identification: Hull number: DD-922
- Fate: Scrapped, December 2016

General characteristics
- Class & type: Gearing-class destroyer; Kangwon-class destroyer
- Displacement: 2,425 tons
- Length: 390 ft 6 in (119.02 m)
- Beam: 41 ft 1 in (12.52 m)
- Draft: 18 ft 6 in (5.64 m)
- Speed: 35 knots (65 km/h; 40 mph)
- Armament: 6 × 5 in/38 cal. guns; 12 × 40 mm guns; 20 × 20 mm guns; 5 × 21 in (533 mm) torpedo tubes; 6 dcp; 2 dct

USS William R. Rush (DD/DDR-714) was a Gearing-class destroyer in the United States Navy. She was named for William R. Rush.

William R. Rush was laid down on 15 October 1944 at Newark, New Jersey, by the Federal Shipbuilding and Drydock Company; launched on 8 July 1945; sponsored by Mrs. Dorothy Flagg Biddle, a cousin of Captain Rush; and commissioned on 21 September 1945. Completed too late to serve in World War II, she later saw action in during the Korean War. Transferred to the navy of the Republic of Korea (ROK) in 1978, she was finally decommissioned in 2000, then served as a museum ship until being broken up in 2016.

== 1946–1952 ==
After fitting out at the New York Navy Yard and shakedown training out of Guantanamo Bay and Casco Bay, Maine, William R. Rush took part in 8th Fleet maneuvers off the eastern seaboard into May 1946. The destroyer then moved southward, to Pensacola, Florida, where she served as a plane guard for Ranger the aircraft carrier conducted flight training operations. Arriving back at Newport, Rhode Island, her home port, on 28 July, William R. Rush spent the rest of the year in local operations.

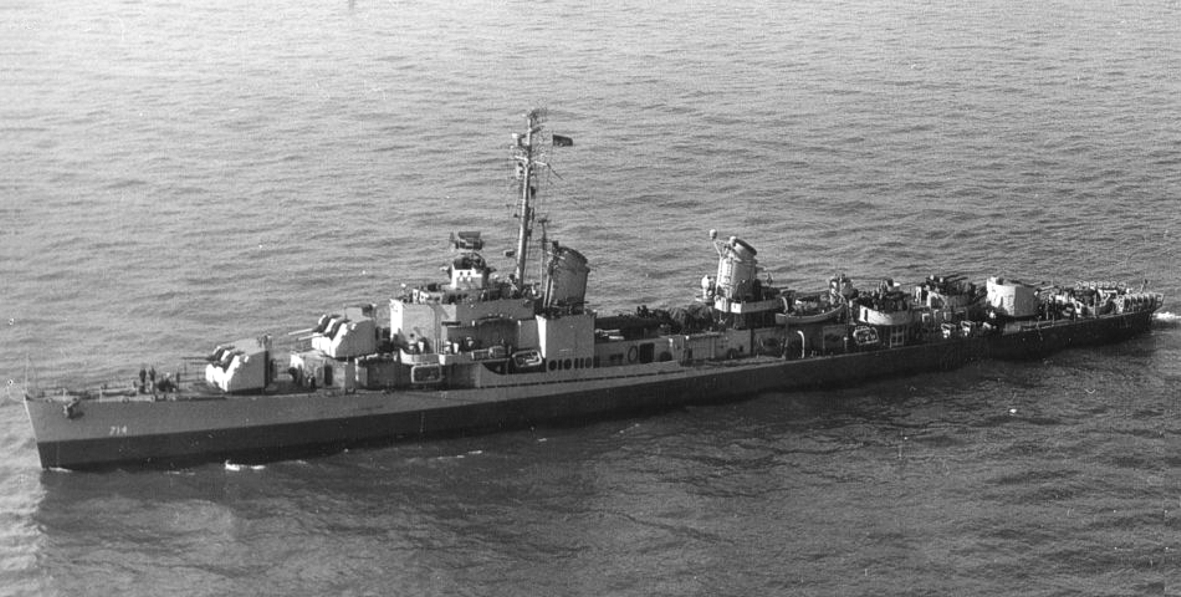
William R. Rush in 1946.

The destroyer departed Newport on 9 February 1948, bound for Europe and her first overseas deployment. She touched at ports of call in England, Ireland, Norway, France, Germany, Denmark, French Morocco, and Gibraltar before returning to Newport in June. For the next two years, William R. Rush operated off the eastern seaboard, exercising with submarines and escorting and plane-guarding for carriers.

In July 1949, William R. Rush sailed for Europe for an extended European and Mediterranean deployment that lasted into the following year. She touched at ports in France, Greece, Crete, Turkey, Gibraltar, England, Scotland, and Belgium, before she returned to Newport. Subsequently, overhauled for three months at Boston, Massachusetts the destroyer carried out refresher training in Guantanamo Bay from May into July 1950. Commencing in mid-July, William R. Rush conducted a training cruise that took the warship and her embarked midshipmen from Halifax, Nova Scotia, to Guantanamo Bay.

Returning to Newport on 1 September 1950, William R. Rush visited NS Argentia and St. John's, Newfoundland, during October; spent much of the following month engaged in Operation "Convex I"—a convoy and striking force exercise; and underwent a period of upkeep back in her homeport, preparing for her next extended deployment.

On 3 January 1951, William R. Rush sailed for the Far East. Steaming via the Panama Canal, Pearl Harbor, Midway, and Sasebo, Japan, the destroyer subsequently joined Task Force (TF) 77 in Korean waters and conducted her first shore bombardment mission on 7 February, shelling North Korean rail lines along the coast. Bombardment and escort missions kept the ship continuously occupied until 13 June, when she began her voyage to the United States, steaming via the Indian Ocean, the Suez Canal, the Mediterranean Sea, and the North Atlantic.

== 1952–1964 ==
William R. Rush completed her circumnavigation of the globe when she returned to Newport on 8 August 1951. She spent the rest of 1951 on maneuvers and exercises from her home port before she entered the Boston Naval Shipyard at the end of the year for conversion to a radar picket ship. The ensuing refit—during which she was decommissioned on 21 December 1951—entailed replacing the ship's 40 mm Bofors batteries with rapid-fire 3 inch mounts; removing her torpedo tubes; and receiving improved electronic and radar equipment to enable the ship to perform her new picket role, itself an outgrowth of World War II experience with kamikazes in the Pacific. Reclassified to DDR-714 on 18 July 1952, William R. Rush was recommissioned on 3 September 1952.

Returning to Newport from her shakedown cruise as a DDR soon thereafter, William R. Rush underwent refresher training in Guantanamo Bay before she called at Mobile Bay, Alabama, for the 1953 Mardi Gras festivities.

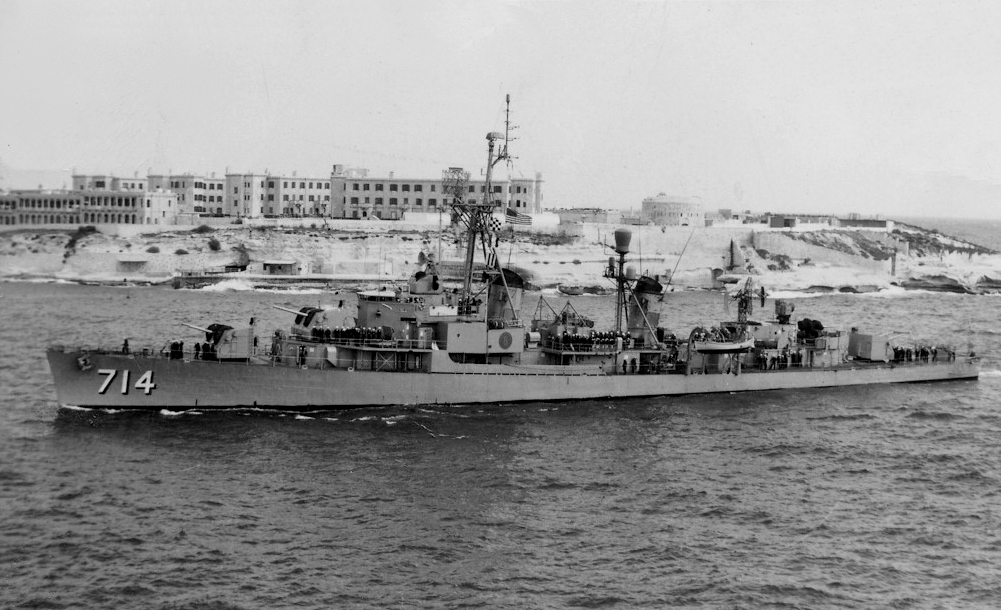
William R. Rush as a radar picket destroyer in 1961

William R. Rush conducted her second 6th Fleet deployment from April to October and then operated locally out of Newport. She performed varying duties into the summer of the following year, carrying out, in succession: antisubmarine warfare (ASW) exercises; plane-guard duties with carriers; and a tour as engineering school ship for the Atlantic Fleet Destroyer Force. She next embarked 66 NROTC midshipmen and sailed for the British Isles, touching at Irish and British ports before she returned to Guantanamo Bay for training. Disembarking the midshipmen at Norfolk on 3 September 1954, William R. Rush soon thereafter shifted to Boston, Massachusetts for a three-month overhaul.

Over the next decade, from 1954 to 1964, William R. Rush was deployed to the Mediterranean, for tours of duty with the 6th Fleet, on eight occasions, touching at ports that ranged from Gibraltar to Beirut, Lebanon, and including Pollença Bay and Palma, Mallorca; Naples and Livorno, Italy; Athens and Thessaloniki, Greece; Golfe Juan, France; Barcelona and Rota, Spain. During her service with the 6th Fleet, William R. Rush operated as plane guard and radar picket for fast carrier task forces and participated in NATO exercises. There were highlights of the cruises: in 1955, while at Golfe Juan, the destroyer hosted Mrs. James J. Cabot, the daughter of Capt. William R. Rush; and, in 1957, the ship cruised the Mediterranean with Naval Academy midshipmen embarked.

In between the Mediterranean deployments, William R. Rush operated from the Arctic Circle to the Caribbean, homeported first at Newport, from 1954 to 1958, and then from Mayport, Florida, from 1958 to 1964. She twice penetrated north of the Arctic Circle, in the autumn of 1957 and late in 1960, both times on NATO exercises.

There were highlights of the ship's closer-to-home deployments as well. In the summer of 1960, the ship embarked 35 Naval Academy midshipmen and took part in operations off the eastern seaboard with the Atlantic Fleet. She visited Quebec City, Canada; Hamilton, Bermuda; and Poughkeepsie, New York, during the cruise. That autumn, the ship served on "barrier patrol" when Cuban Premier Fidel Castro threatened the Caribbean nations of Nicaragua and Honduras. Two years later, in the fall of 1962, after American reconnaissance planes discovered the presence of Soviet offensive missiles in Cuba, William R. Rush returned to the area and operated with TF 135 on the Cuban "quarantine" line from 20 October to 3 December. The ship was at sea continuously during that period, except for an availability alongside the destroyer tender Yosemite from 12 to 17 November.

== 1964-1978 ==
William R. Rush departed Mayport, Florida on 22 June 1964 and arrived at the New York Naval Shipyard on the 26th. Once at the shipyard, the ship commenced a 10-month Fleet Rehabilitation and Modernization (FRAM) overhaul, at the completion of which she would resume her old classification, DD-714.

William R. Rush departed New York on 30 April 1965. Homeported back at Newport, the modernized destroyer soon commenced regular operations with the Fleet, following essentially the same sort of schedule that she had pursued since commissioning in 1945.

As a member of Destroyer Squadron (DesRon) 10, she operated off the eastern seaboard between Newport and Key West, Florida, assuming a new role as an antisubmarine warfare ship. Returning to Newport on 27 July 1965 from refresher training out of Guantanamo Bay and a week of providing services to the Fleet Sonar School at Key West, William R. Rush embarked 25 NROTC midshipmen for three weeks at sea with Royal Canadian Navy units on exercise "CANUS (Canadian and United States) SILEX 1-65."

The ship then went back to Newport for availability alongside Yosemite and then conducted two weeks of type training before moving south to Key West for a month of Sonar School services. A highlight of that deployment to Florida coastal waters came in September, when she rescued seven Cuban nationals who had originally been bound back to Cuba to bring out relatives. Their two boats had developed engine trouble and were in danger of capsizing in heavy seas.

William R. Rush returned to Newport shortly before Thanksgiving of 1965 and spent the remainder of the year in home waters before getting underway on 14 February 1966 for the Mediterranean. Highlighting the ship's 10th Mediterranean deployment were the usual good will stops at ports in Italy, Rhodes, Sicily, and Turkey; ASW exercises with American and Spanish Navy units, including Exercise "Spanex 1-66"; and 6th Fleet antiaircraft and ASW maneuvers. Relieved on 21 June at Gibraltar, the destroyer returned to the East Coast of the United States.

William R. Rush spent the remainder of 1966 on operations off the eastern seaboard, ranging from Newport to the Virginia Capes, pursuing a well-rounded slate of exercises including, among others, such areas as gunfire support and ASW. Early in 1967, the ship enhanced her capabilities as an ASW destroyer by receiving two Drone Antisubmarine Helicopters (DASH) and becoming fully qualified in DASH operations.

William R. Rush departed Newport on 1 March 1967 and crossed the Atlantic in company with Galveston. The destroyer subsequently called at Gibraltar, Sardinia, and Athens before transiting the Suez Canal on 1 April. She relieved Steinaker the following day at Port Suez. William R. Rush then set course for Bahrain. En route, the destroyer was fueled from the French oiler Aritrea at Massawa, Ethiopia, on 6 April.

Arriving at Bahrain on 13 April, William R. Rush joined Valcour, the flagship of Rear Admiral E. R. Eastwold, Commander, Middle East Forces (Mid-EastFor). In the ensuing weeks, the destroyer—on her first MidEastFor deployment—visited Masirah Island, where the British Royal Air Force maintained a small logistics airfield; Karachi, Pakistan; and Massawa for a fuel stop. William R. Rush returned to Port Suez on 21 May and was relieved there by Fiske.

The next day, William R. Rush transited the Suez Canal on her way back to the Mediterranean. At that time, tension was great in the Suez since the President of the United Arab Republic, Gamal Abdel Nasser, had demanded on 17 May that the United Nations Expeditionary Force (UNEF) be withdrawn from Egypt and the Gaza Strip posthaste. On the 20th, Egypt began patrolling Israel's coast.

The destroyer's commanding officer subsequently reported: "As (William R.) Rush passed through the Canal we could feel an atmosphere of tension all about us; gun emplacements and troops were obvious on both sides of the Canal."

William R. Rush moored alongside Tidewater, where she spent the first few days of June undergoing a tender availability. However, the outbreak of full-scale war between Israel and her Arab neighbors on 5 June meant a hurried deployment seaward.

The destroyer operated with 6th Fleet units as they conducted emergency contingency force operations until the 17th. She subsequently called at Istanbul from 21 to 26 June before serving as plane guard and picket for America south of Crete. The destroyer later touched at Kavalla, Greece, and Sardinia and Rota, homeward bound. She finally reached Newport on 20 July, ending the eventful deployment.

That autumn, William R. Rush operated off the coast of Florida, aiding the Fleet Sonar School in training officers and participating in ASW exercises. She then enjoyed a period of leave and upkeep at her home port to round out the year.

Late in January 1968, William R. Rush operated out of Newport as school ship for the Naval Destroyer School. In mid-March, she continued her training-oriented activities when she embarked 32 prospective destroyer officers and sailed for the Caribbean in company with Gainard and Glennon. During that cruise, she visited St. Croix, Virgin Islands, and San Juan, Puerto Rico. Soon after the ship returned to her home port, she shifted to the Boston Naval Shipyard for a four-month overhaul.

Over the next 11 years, William R. Rush conducted two more Mediterranean deployments, in early 1969 and from the autumn of 1970 to the spring of 1971, in between which she operated, as before, off the eastern seaboard and into the Caribbean. Ports visited with the 6th Fleet included Rota and Barcelona, Spain; Piraeus, Greece; Venice, Genoa and San Remo, Italy; Sfax, Tunisia; and Valletta, Malta. A social highlight of the 1969 deployment was when the officers and men of the ship were hosted royally on three separate occasions by Contessa Catherine Rush Visconti-Prasca—the daughter of the ship's William R. Rush—at her villa.

During that deployment, the ship participated in the usual slate of maneuvers and exercises including stints plane-guarding for Forrestal and John F. Kennedy, and taking part in NATO Exercise "Dawn Patrol." Returning home, William R. Rush visited Liverpool, England, and Oslo, Norway, and then spent a grueling period in the North Atlantic—operating, on occasion, north of the Arctic Circle again—with a hunter-killer group tasked with perfecting ASW tactics. For her part in that significant evolution— operating in company with Wasp—William R. Rush received the Meritorious Unit Commendation.

Highlighting the ship's 1970 and 1971 6th Fleet deployment was a special intelligence mission. On 23 January 1971, William R. Rush departed Naples and, over the next 26 days, shadowed the Soviet helicopter carrier Leningrad in the Gulf of Sollum, gathering new and noteworthy intelligence data on that ship and her operations. Following that event, the destroyer resumed her other duties, ultimately returning home to Newport on 2 May 1971.

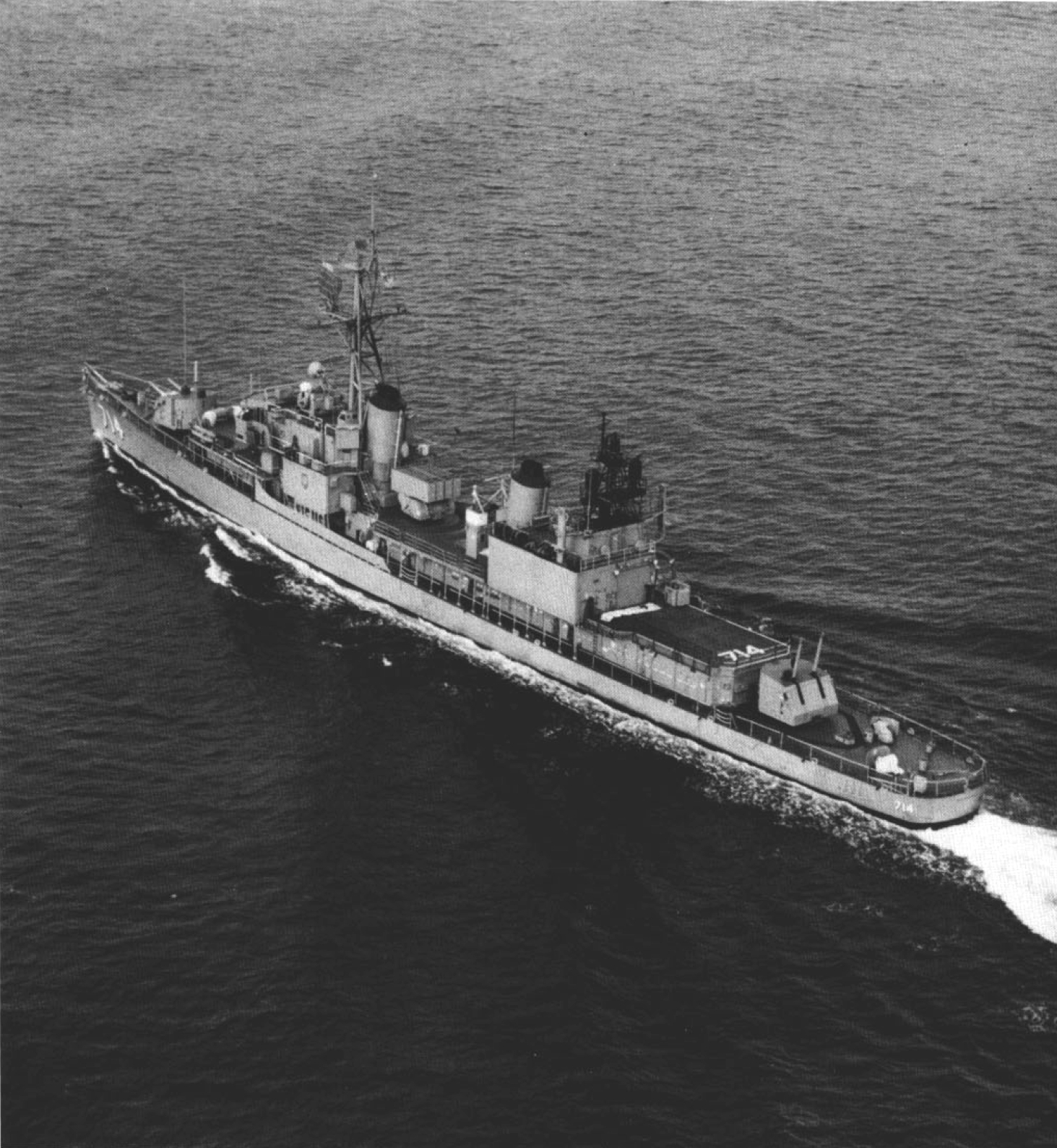
William R. Rush in 1976.

On 5 April 1972, William R. Rush—in company with Charles H. Roan-—departed Newport, bound for the Middle East and Indian Ocean. En route, the ship visited Port-au-Spain, Trinidad; Recife, Brazil; Luanda, Angola; and Lourencp Marques, Mozambique, before arriving at Port Louis, Mauritius, on 11 May. William R. Rush subsequently stopped at Moroni, Grand Comoro, Comores Islands; Mombasa, Kenya; Karachi, Pakistan; and Kharg Island, off the coast of Iran. Additionally, the ship spent a two-week upkeep period at the MidEastFor home port, Bahrain, where she was visited by the Honorable William P. Rogers, the Secretary of State, on 3 July. She later called at Dammam, Saudi Arabia, where she embarked 19 Royal Saudi Naval Force officers for underway training from 15 to 19 July.

A Red Sea excursion took William R. Rush to Massawa and return visits to Mombasa, Port Louis, and Bahrain. In the course of the deployment and during transits between ports, William R. Rush twice conducted surveillance operations at Russian naval anchorages near Socotra Island and Cape Guardafui and once at Coetivy Island.

During the time spent operating under the aegis of Commander, MidEastFor, William R. Rush operated primarily as an ambassador of good will, "showing the flag" in an area where the Soviet Union's naval presence was becoming more marked.

Ultimately, after conducting exercises with Charles H. Roan and the British frigate HMS Lowestoft, William R. Rush departed Bahrain. She continued her circumnavigation of the globe with visits to the ports of Karachi, Pakistan; Colombo, Sri Lanka; Singapore; Hong Kong; Yokosuka, Japan; Midway; Pearl Harbor; San Diego; and the Panama Canal before she arrived back at Newport on 31 October 1972.

William R. Rush subsequently operated out of Newport on local operations into March 1973. Then, after an overhaul at the Boston Naval Shipyard, William R. Rush was assigned to DesRon 28 on 2 July 1973 for service as a Naval Reserve training ship.

Homeported at Fort Schuyler, Bronx, New York, William R. Rush spent the next five years training selected reserve crews and operating between the Virginia Capes Operating Area and Halifax, Nova Scotia.

USS William R. Rush was decommissioned at Fort Schuyler on 1 July 1978 and was simultaneously struck from the Navy List.

== 1978-2016 ==
William R. Rush was transferred on 1 July 1978 to the navy of the Republic of Korea (ROK) under the terms of the Security Assistance Program and renamed ROKS Kang Won (DD-922).

The ship was involved in many patrol missions in the Yellow Sea and the Sea of Japan. In particular when she sank a mother ship spy vessel from North Korea in 1984 in the Sea of Japan, which was the first ever feat by the ROK Navy. As a result, the ship and crewmen were awarded medals and several promotions followed. The North Korean spy boat was hit by a missile launched from an Alouette III helicopter operating from Kang Won and later destroyed by the guns of the ship. It was only one year after the ship was equipped with a flight deck for French-made Alouette III helicopters. Kang Won was one of the most decorated vessels in ROK Navy history when she retired from the active duty in 1999. The ship was decommissioned from the ROK Navy on 31 December 2000. She was stationed as a museum ship at the South Korean naval headquarters in Jinhae, and was later transferred to Changwon Marine Park (창원해양공원). The vessel was returned to the ROK Navy on 30 November 2016.

In December 2016, she arrived at Busan Dadaepo port for dismantling.
