= Russell R. Waesche =

U.S. Coast Guard admiral (1886–1946

Russell Randolph Waesche Sr.
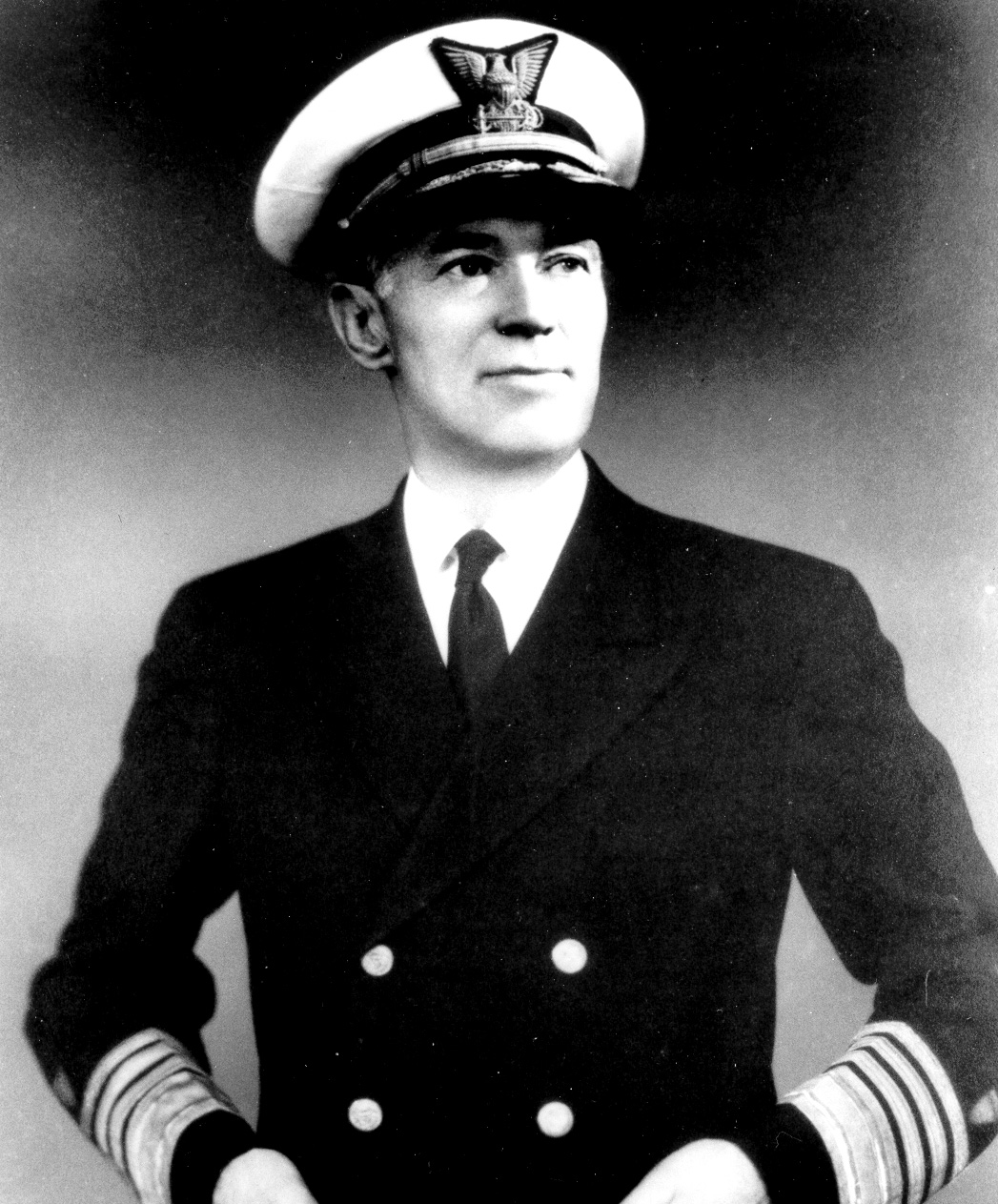
- Waesche in the 1940s
- Born: Russell Randolph Waesche; 6 January 1886; Thurmont, Maryland, U.S.
- Died: 17 October 1946 (aged 60); National Naval Medical Center; Bethesda, Maryland, U.S.
- Burial place: Arlington National Cemetery; Arlington County, Virginia, U.S.
- Military career
- Allegiance: United States
- Branch: U.S. Revenue Cutter Service; United States Coast Guard
- Service years: 1906–1946
- Rank: Admiral
- Commands: Commandant
- Conflicts: World War II
- Awards: Navy Distinguished Service Medal; Navy Commendation Ribbon

Russell Randolph Waesche Sr. (6 January 1886 – 17 October 1946) served as the eighth Commandant of the United States Coast Guard from 1936 to 1946, overseeing the service during World War II. He was the U.S. Coast Guard's longest serving commandant, having served ten years in that post. In addition, he was the first officer to hold the ranks of vice admiral and admiral within the Coast Guard.

== Early life and education ==
Waesche was born and raised in Thurmont, Maryland. He was fifth of the eight children of Leonard Randolph Waesche and Mary Martha Foreman. Waesche's grandfather George Henry Waesche was a German immigrant who had become a prominent figure in Carroll County, Maryland. Following graduation from high school, Waesche attended Purdue University for a year before transferring to the U.S. Revenue Cutter Service School of Instruction and accepting an appointment as a cadet in 1904. He graduated from the Revenue Cutter School of Instruction in 1906.

== Career ==
After graduating with the rank of ensign (or third lieutenant as the rank was then known in the Revenue Cutter Service), Waesche served in the North Atlantic, the Great Lakes, and the Pacific Northwest. In 1911, Waesche commanded USRC Arcata and USRC Pamlico. In 1915, Waesche was assigned to headquarters in Washington, D.C. While stationed in Washington in 1915, he took an active part in creating the Coast Guard with the merger of the Revenue Cutter Service and the U.S. Life-Saving Service. Waesche remained in Washington and in 1916, became the head of the communications division. During World War I, Waesche remained in Washington.

In 1919, the 18th Amendment was passed, and Waesche was assigned to enforce prohibition at sea. He commanded various destroyers in preventing "rum runners" from entering port. He commanded USCGC Beale. After he served on Beale, he went to the Philadelphia Navy Yard and was the Coast Guard representative at the U.S. Sesquicentennial International Exposition. He later commanded USCGC Tucker. Waesche also commanded USCGC Bothwell (ex-Eagle 21) and USCGC Snohomish. At Coast Guard Headquarters, Waesche started the Coast Guard Institute and Correspondence School for warrant officers and enlisted personnel as well as the reorganization of Coast Guard field forces in 1932.

In February 1932, he became liaison officer in the War Plans Division, Office of the Chief of Naval Operations, Navy Department. After completion of this duty he served as aide to Commandant Harry G. Hamlet, then he was Chief of the Finance Division, and Assistant Commandant. He was appointed Commandant as rear admiral on 14 June 1936, and was largely responsible for the merger of the U.S. Lighthouse Service with the Coast Guard in 1939. He was also instrumental in organizing the Coast Guard Auxiliary and a strong Coast Guard Reserve which underwent its greatest expansion in history. During World War II, Waesche served as commandant of the Coast Guard and received honors for his service.

Waesche was promoted to vice admiral in 1942 and admiral in 1945 and was the first Coast Guard officer to achieve those ranks.

== Later life and death ==
Waesche retired from the Coast Guard on 31 December 1945 after serving the longest tenure as commandant in Coast Guard history.

In March 1946, President Harry S. Truman nominated the ten top wartime generals and admirals of the United States Armed Forces including Waesche who were to retain permanently their wartime rank.

Waesche died on 17 October 1946, nine months after retiring as Commandant, at the National Naval Medical Center in Bethesda, Maryland due to complications of leukemia. He is buried in Arlington National Cemetery.

== Personal life ==
Waesche was married to Agnes R. (Cronin) Waesche (1894–1947) and had four sons. His eldest son, Russell Randolph Waesche Jr. (1913–1998), was a U.S. Coast Guard rear admiral who served as the commanding officer of USCGC Northwind from 1960 to 1962, with the rank of captain. Another son, Harry Lee Waesche (1915–2000), was a U.S. Air Force colonel who served during World War II, the Korean War and the Vietnam War.

== Awards and decorations ==
- Navy Distinguished Service Medal
- Navy Commendation Ribbon
- World War I Victory Medal
- American Defense Service Medal
- American Campaign Medal
- World War II Victory Medal

== Dates of rank ==
Third lieutenant (USRCS)	Second lieutenant (USRCS)	First lieutenant	Lieutenant commander	Commander	Captain
O-1	O-2	O-3	O-4	O-5	O-6
27 October 1906	2 September 1907	2 April 1917	12 January 1923	1 July 1926	Never held

Commodore	Rear admiral	Vice admiral	Admiral
O-7	O-8	O-9	O-10
Never held	14 June 1936	10 March 1942	4 April 1945

== Legacy ==
- Waesche Hall at the U.S. Coast Guard Academy is named in honor of Admiral Waesche (who graduated from the Academy when it was known as the Revenue Cutter School of Instruction). The building houses the Academy library and admissions department and is the current location of the Coast Guard Museum.
- The U.S. Coast Guard cutter, USCGC Waesche, is named in his honor.

== See also ==
- United States Coast Guard Auxiliary

== Notes ==
Citations

References cited

- "Admiral Russell R. Waesche". Notable people. U.S. Coast Guard Historian's Office.
- "Commandants of the U.S. Coast Guard & Chiefs of the Revenue Marine Division". Archived from the original on 20 May 2017.
- "Rear Admiral Russell R. Waesche, Jr". Notable People. U.S. Coast Guard Historian's Office.
- "Russell R. Waesche Jr., 84, Rear Admiral". The New York Times. 15 June 1998. p. 21.
- "Admiral Waesche Dead at Age of 60". New York Times, 18 October 1946, p. 21.
- Holdcraft, Jacob Mehrling. Obituaries, Bible records, church records, family genealogies, county records, etc. for Frederick County, Maryland, 1800–1977. FHL Microfilm 1002706; Thurmont Obituary.
- Johnson, Robert Irwin (1987). Guardians of the Sea, History of the United States Coast Guard, 1915 to the Present. Naval Institute Press, Annapolis, Maryland. ISBN 978-0-87021-720-3.

Military offices
Preceded by Harry G. Hamlet	Commandant of the Coast Guard; 1936–1946	Succeeded by Joseph F. Farley
