= USRC Boutwell =

Ship of the U.S. Revenue Cutter Service (1873-1907)

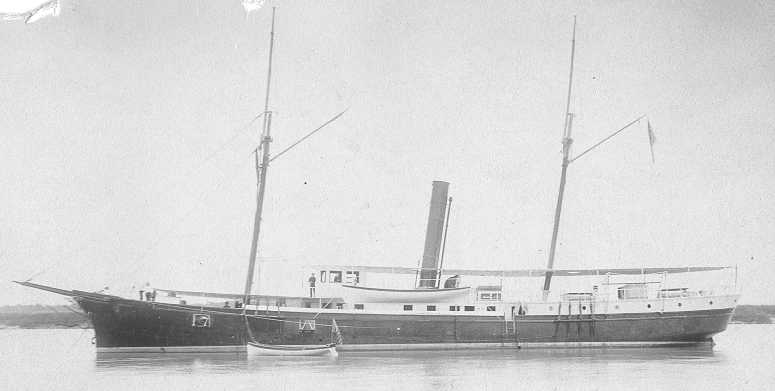
- USRC Boutwell in July 1892

History

United States
- Name: USRC Boutwell
- Namesake: George Boutwell
- Operator: United States Revenue Cutter Service (1873–1897, 1897–1907); United States Navy (1897)
- Builder: David Bell, Buffalo, New York
- Cost: US$70,000
- Commissioned: 29 October 1873
- Decommissioned: 26 July 1907
- Out of service: Sold, 23 October 1907

General characteristics
- Displacement: 198 tons
- Length: 138 ft (42 m)
- Beam: 23 ft (7.0 m)
- Draft: 6 ft 9 in (2.06 m)
- Installed power: 1 Semi-compound steam engine, 21"and 31" x 24" stroke
- Propulsion: twin screw
- Sail plan: Topsail schooner
- Complement: 7 officers, 31 enlisted men
- Armament: 2 guns of unspecified caliber

USRC George S. Boutwell (later Boutwell) was a revenue cutter of the United States Revenue Cutter Service that served from 1873 to 1907 designed for cruising the southern coasts. She was named for George S. Boutwell, the 28th United States Secretary of the Treasury.

== Construction ==
Boutwell was an iron–hulled top-sail schooner fitted with a single semi-compound steam engine, 21 in (53 cm) and 31 in (79 cm) x 24 in (61 cm) stroke, powering twin screws. She was constructed at the shipyard of David Bell of Buffalo, New York with a contract cost of US$ 70,000. She had an unusual power-plant in that the two cylinders could operate independently with one cylinder per screw or together as a compound engine. She displaced 198 tons and was 138 ft (42 m) long with a beam of 23 ft (7.0 m) and a draft of 6 ft 9 in (2.06 m). The first use of steel in Revenue Service cutters was specified in the construction of valve stems and crank pins installed in the Boutwell engine room.

== History ==
Boutwell was commissioned at Buffalo, New York on 29 October 1873. She was stationed temporarily at Ogdensburg, New York before being assigned a homeport on 11 September 1874 at Savannah, Georgia. On 18 February 1879 she was directed to make a monthly cruise to Jacksonville, Florida. On 27 August 1881 Boutwell was driven aground by a hurricane at McQueens Island on the Savannah River. On 20 October 1882, the Revenue Cutter Service contracted with Malster & Reaney of Baltimore, Maryland to build a new boiler, repair machinery and hull for US$17,575 with work to commence 30 October 1882. She was ordered to return to Savannah after refit and arrived there 13 June 1883 to resume a regular cruising schedule to Jacksonville monthly. With tensions between the Spanish and the U.S. rising over Cuban independence, Boutwell, USRC Colfax and USRC Windom were directed to enforce neutrality laws from Wilmington, North Carolina to Pensacola, Florida. She was ordered to serve with the U.S. Navy from 27 April to 1 June 1897. On 24 December she was ordered to Jacksonville to maintain surveillance over the tug Dauntless which had been seized by USRC Louis McLane for neutrality violations related to smuggling arms into Cuba. Dauntless had been seized with 175 rifles and 300,000 rounds of ammunition and medical supplies on board and Boutwell guarded her until 24 February 1898. On 24 September 1898, she was permanently assigned a new homeport at New Bern, North Carolina where she served until 3 July 1907. Boutwell was transferred to the Revenue Cutter Service Depot at Arundel Cove, Maryland where the commanding officer received orders to transfer the officers and crew to the newly built USRC Pamlico. Boutwell was decommissioned at Baltimore, Maryland, 26 July 1907 and sold to Leo Kimball of Mobile, Alabama for US$2,010 on 23 October 1907.

== Notes ==
=== References used ===
- "Record of Movements, Vessels of the United States Coast Guard, 1790–December 31, 1933 (1989 reprint)" (PDF). U.S. Coast Guard Historian's Office.
- Canney, Donald L. (1995). U.S. Coast Guard and Revenue Cutters, 1790–1935. Naval Institute Press, Annapolis. ISBN 978-1-55750-101-1.
- Evans, Stephen H. (1949). The United States Coast Guard 1790–1915: A Definitive History. Naval Institute Press, Annapolis, Maryland. No ISBN
- King, Irving H. (1996). The Coast Guard Expands, 1865–1915: New Roles, New Frontiers. Naval Institute Press, Annapolis, Maryland. ISBN 978-1-55750-458-6.
