= Harry G. Hamlet =

United States Coast Guard Commandant (1874–1954)

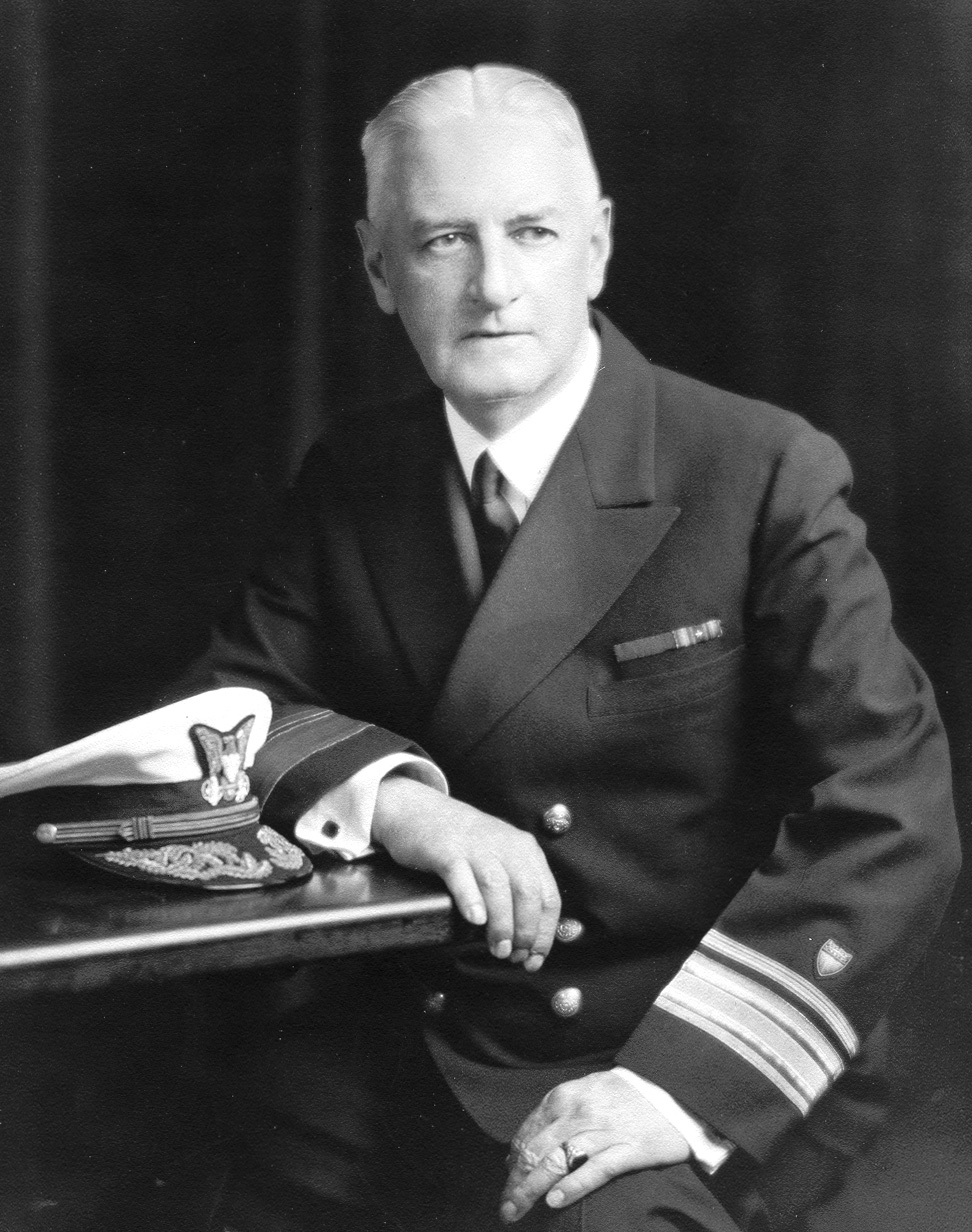
- Born: 27 August 1874; Eastport, Maine, U.S.
- Died: 24 January 1954 (aged 79)
- Buried: Arlington National Cemetery
- Branch: United States Coast Guard
- Service years: 1894–1938
- Rank: Vice admiral
- Commands: Commandant of the Coast Guard; Superintendent of the United States Coast Guard Academy; Superintendent of the Philadelphia Navy Yard; USCGC Mojave; USS Marietta; USCGC Algonquin; USRC Unalga
- Conflicts: World War I
- Awards: Gold Lifesaving Medal

Harry Gabriel Hamlet (27 August 1874 – 24 January 1954) was the seventh Commandant of the United States Coast Guard, from 1932 to 1936.

== Early life and career ==
Hamlet was born in Eastport, Maine, and was the son of Captain Oscar G. Hamlet, an officer in the United States Revenue Cutter Service. Upon graduation from high school in the Dorchester neighborhood of Boston, Massachusetts, he attended the Massachusetts Institute of Technology. He was appointed as one of twelve cadets to the recently reopened Revenue Cutter Service School of Instruction on 12 April 1894 and received training aboard USRC Chase, the school's newly refitted training cutter. After completion of training, Hamlet was commissioned as a third lieutenant on 27 April 1896 and was assigned to USRC Bear and served aboard her during the Overland Relief Expedition which involved the rescue of whalers trapped in Arctic ice near Point Barrow, Alaska. Hamlet was promoted to second lieutenant on 11 August 1897. (Note: Noble claims the date of promotion to second lieutenant was 17 January 1898.)

Hamlet reported aboard the newly reacquired USRC Thetis at Mare Island Navy Yard in 1899. After a refit, Thetis was assigned duty in Siberia to purchase reindeer for transport to Alaska. The reindeer were to be used to start herds in Alaska which were to eventually be used to supplement winter food supplies for Alaska natives. Hamlet was especially skilled at bartering with the Siberian natives and was put in charge of all negotiations for the cruise. He was later singled out by the captain of the Thetis for his skill in barter in dispatches to headquarters.

In 1900, Hamlet became one of the first Revenue Cutter Service officers to attend the Naval War College in Newport, Rhode Island. Upon completion of his studies, he returned to duty aboard the Bear, serving on patrol duty with the Bering Sea Patrol. On 28 March 1905 Hamlet was promoted to first lieutenant. (Note: Noble claims the date for promotion to first lieutenant was 10 April 1905.) On 19 July 1913 Hamlet was promoted to captain. (Note: A Revenue Cutter Service captain was equivalent in rank to a Navy lieutenant commander at that time.) On 25 November 1913 he assumed his first command as a captain as the commanding officer of USRC Unalga, home-ported at Seattle, Washington. Hamlet was transferred to the United States Coast Guard Depot at Curtis Bay, Maryland on 15 November 1915. (Note: President Woodrow Wilson signed Senate Bill 2337 on 28 January 1915 creating the United States Coast Guard through the merger of the United States Life-Saving Service with the United States Revenue Cutter Service. On that date the newly formed service had 25 sea-going cutters and 19 harbor tugs and launches and 270 stations. The bill authorized 4093 officers, warrant officers, and enlisted men. The service also consisted of one headquarters at Washington, D.C., 17 regional commands, four depots and one academy.)

== World War I and postwar assignments ==
On 18 September 1917 Hamlet was assigned to the Third Naval District at Bensonhurst, New York. He immediately assumed command of USCGC Algonquin before she sailed on 20 September to join the U.S. Naval forces at Brest, France Upon arrival in Europe he was assigned command of the USS Marietta. While in command of Marietta in the Bay of Biscay on 28 April 1919, Captain Hamlet rescued a crew of 47 persons from the USS James which was sinking at sea. This rescue was made extremely difficult and hazardous owing to high seas, which threatened to send the two vessels crashing together. In effecting the rescue, Hamlet displayed admirable seamanship and on 5 January 1920 he was awarded the Gold Lifesaving Medal. From 1919 to 1922, he served as the Coast Guard's Chief Personnel Officer. In May 1922 Hamlet assumed command of USCGC Mojave at Honolulu, Hawaii and took her on a cruise through the Far East on the way to her new homeport of Boston, Massachusetts. From 1924 to 1928, he served as Superintendent of the Philadelphia Navy Yard. From 1928 until his appointment as commandant, he served as superintendent of the United States Coast Guard Academy at New London, Connecticut.

== Commandant ==
Following the death of Frederick C. Billard, he was appointed as Commandant of the Coast Guard by President Herbert Hoover on 14 June 1932. As Commandant during the Great Depression, he struggled with low budgets and limited appropriations. In response, Hamlet implemented a cost-cutting plan which called for decommissioning of vessels, closing of Coast Guard stations, manpower reductions, and a 25% reduction in expenditures. These measures led to calls to merge the Coast Guard with the United States Navy. With the support of Chief of Naval Operations, Admiral William V. Pratt, however, Hamlet succeeded in persuading President Franklin D. Roosevelt and Congress from taking such action.

== Later career ==
Upon completion of his term, he was succeeded as commandant by Russell R. Waesche, and reverted in rank to captain on 1 January 1936. He was retained on special duty in the office of Secretary of the Treasury Henry Morgenthau Jr. He also served as Chairman of the Personnel Advisory Committee to the U.S. Senate Commerce Committee, which was responsible for studying maritime issues and recommending legislation on improving the United States Merchant Marine.

== The Creed of the United States Coast Guardsman ==
The following creed was authored by Admiral Hamlet in 1938:

I am proud to be a United States Coast Guardsman.
I revere that long line of expert seamen who by their devotion to duty and sacrifice of self have made it possible for me to be a member of a service honored and respected, in peace and war, throughout the world.
I never, by word or deed, will bring reproach upon the fair name of my service, nor permit others to do so unchallenged.
I will cheerfully and willingly obey all lawful orders.
I will always be on time to relieve, and shall endeavor to do more, rather than less, than my share.
I will always be at my station, alert and attending to my duties.
I shall, so far as I am able, bring to my seniors solutions, not problems.
I shall live joyously, but always with due regard for the rights and privileges of others.
I shall endeavor to be a model citizen in the community in which I live.
I shall sell my life dearly to an enemy of my country, but give it freely to rescue those in peril.
With God's help, I shall endeavor to be one of His Noblest Works...

A UNITED STATES COAST GUARDSMAN.

== Retirement ==
Hamlet retired from the U.S. Coast Guard on 1 September 1938, just after his 64th birthday. By virtue of his service as commandant, his retired rank would have been rear admiral; he was, however, promoted to vice admiral in recognition of his four decades of service. After his death at the age of 79, he was interred at Arlington National Cemetery.

== Awards ==
- Gold Lifesaving Medal
- World War I Victory Medal with clasp

== Notes ==
Footnotes

Citations

References cited

- "The Creed of the United States Coast Guardsman". History, Heritage & Traditions: Creed of the United States Coast Guardsman. U.S. Coast Guard Historian's Office.
- "Harry G. Hamlet, 1932–1936" (PDF). Commandants of the U.S. Coast Guard. U.S. Coast Guard Historians Office.
- "Record of Movements: Vessels of the United States Coast Guard, 1790 – December 31, 1933" (PDF). U.S. Coast Guard History. U.S. Coast Guard Historian's Office.
- Register of the Officers, Vessels, and Stations of the United States Coast Guard, 1915. Washington, D.C.: U.S. Government Printing Office. 1 August 1915.
- Register of the Officers, Vessels, and Stations of the United States Coast Guard, 1916. Washington, D.C.: U.S. Government Printing Office. 1 July 1916.
- Register of the Officers, Vessels, and Stations of the United States Coast Guard, 1918. Washington, D.C.: U.S. Government Printing Office. 1 January 1918.
- Canney, Donald L. (1995). U.S. Coast Guard and Revenue Cutters, 1790–1935. Naval Institute Press, Annapolis, Maryland. ISBN 978-1-55750-101-1.
- Johnson, Robert Irwin (1987). Guardians of the Sea, History of the United States Coast Guard, 1915 to the Present. Naval Institute Press, Annapolis, Maryland. ISBN 978-0-87021-720-3.
- King, Irving H. (1996). The Coast Guard Expands, 1865–1915: New Roles, New Frontiers. Naval Institute Press, Annapolis, Maryland. ISBN 978-1-55750-458-6.
- Kroll, C. Douglas (2002). Commodore Ellsworth P. Bertholf: First Commandant of the Coast Guard. Naval Institute Press, Annapolis, Maryland. ISBN 978-1-55750-474-6.
- Larzelere, Alex (2003). The Coast Guard in World War I: An Untold Story. Naval Institute Press, Annapolis, Maryland. ISBN 978-1-55750-476-0.
- Noble (1990), Dennis L. "Historical Register U.S. Revenue Cutter Service Officers, 1790–1914" (PDF). U.S. Coast Guard Historian's Office.
- Strobridge, Truman R. and Dennis L. Noble (1999). Alaska and the U.S. Revenue Cutter Service, 1867–1915. Naval Institute Press, Annapolis, Maryland. ISBN 978-1-55750-845-4.

Military offices
Preceded by Frederick C. Billard	Commandant of the Coast Guard; 1932—1936	Succeeded by Russell R. Waesche
