= USS James =

Minesweeper of the United States Navy

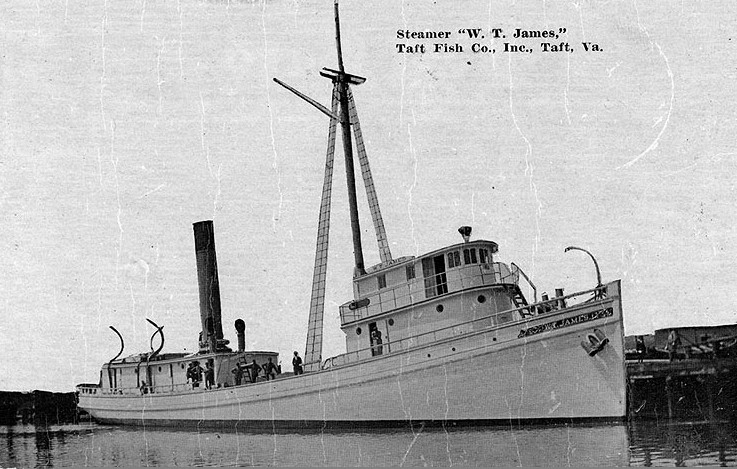
- W.T. James (American Steam Trawler, 1912) Halftone reproduction, printed on a postal card, of a photograph probably taken when this "Menhadden fisherman" type steam trawler was completed in 1912.

History

United States
- Name: USS James
- Namesake: Former name retained, in part
- Owner: Taft Fish Co., of Tappahannock, Virginia
- Builder: Harlan and Hollingsworth, of Wilmington, Delaware
- Laid down: date unknown
- Launched: date unknown
- Completed: 1912 at Wilmington, Delaware as the trawler W. T. James
- Acquired: leased in July 1917 as the trawler James
- Commissioned: on 10 August 1917 in the 5th Naval District
- Decommissioned: Sunk 28 April 1919
- Stricken: circa 28 April 1919
- Fate: Sank in a storm, 28 April 1919
- Notes: Also known as USS W. T. James

General characteristics
- Type: Trawler
- Displacement: 267 long tons (271 t)
- Length: 150 ft (46 m)
- Beam: 22 ft (6.7 m)
- Draft: 8 ft 5 in (2.57 m) (mean)
- Propulsion: Steam engine
- Speed: 13 kn (15 mph; 24 km/h)
- Complement: 38 officers and enlisted
- Armament: 1 × 3 in (76 mm) gun, 2 × .30 in (7.6 mm) machine guns

USS James (SP-429) — also known as USS W. T. James (SP-429) — was a steam trawler acquired by the United States Navy during World War I. She was converted into an armed minesweeper and assigned to the European Theater, where she performed varied tasks, including minesweeping, patrolling, and escorting of larger ships in convoy. In 1919, while returning to the United States, she was severely damaged in a storm off the French coast, and sank. Her crew were rescued.

== A Menhaden fisherman ==
W. T. James — a "Menhaden fisherman" built in 1912 at Wilmington, Delaware by Harlan and Hollingsworth — operated out of the Virginia waterways over the next five years of her service as a trawler before becoming required for the World War I war effort. She was acquired by the Navy in the spring of 1917 from the Taft Fish Company, of Tappahannock, Virginia; ordered delivered on 1 April; and accepted on 28 May for service as a minesweeper.

Under the terms of General Order #314, issued in late July 1917, her name was officially shortened to James, but her original name, W. T. James, also continued in use, at least informally. The erstwhile fishing craft was commissioned in the 5th Naval District on 10 August 1917.

== World War I service ==
=== Outfitted as a minesweeper ===
Later in 1917, James was refitted for minesweeping. Designated SP-429, James was fitted out for "distant service" at the Norfolk Navy Yard and, near the end of August, departed the Tidewater area, bound for Boston, Massachusetts. There, with other sister ships which had made the passage from Hampton Roads, Virginia, James prepared for the voyage to European waters.

=== Assigned to the European coast ===
Accordingly, after shifting from Boston to Provincetown, Massachusetts on 25 August, James got underway for the Azores two days later, on the first leg of the Atlantic Ocean crossing. Reaching Ponta Delgada, Azores on 6 September, James and her sister ships remained for five days, awaiting the tardy arrival of coal and water. On 11 September, the group departed the Azores on the last leg of the passage.

Disbanded as a mine squadron almost immediately after arriving at Brest, France on 18 September, the vessels of the group soon were busy escorting convoys into and out of port. Between these missions, they spent long weeks awaiting delivery of winches and French minesweeping gear. In November, the mine squadron was reconstituted under the command of Captain Thomas P. Magruder. James, among the second group to be fitted out for minesweeping service, soon shifted to Lorient, France, where she would base for the remainder of the war.

From Lorient, James not only conducted minesweeping operations but covered coastal convoys, cleared important passages near Belle Île, undertook night antisubmarine patrols using her crude listening gear, and assisted vessels in distress in her area. In July 1918, James and two sister ships swept a minefield south of Belle Isle and, despite the heavy weather in which the ships were forced to operate, accomplished their mission in such exemplary fashion that the three mine vessels received commendations from Vice Admiral Aubry, the French Prefet Maritime. During this operation, James cut out four mines in the space of 17 minutes.

=== Damaged in a storm at sea ===
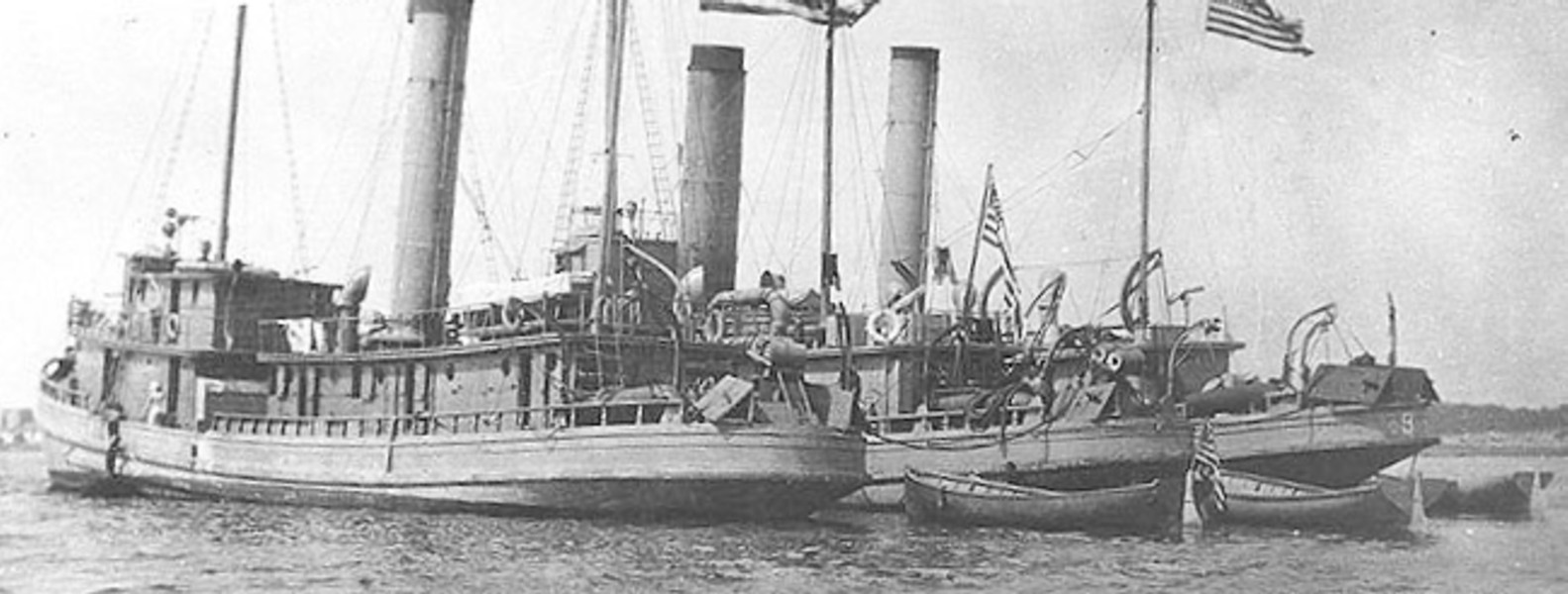
Moored at Lorient, France, in 1918. These ships are identified as USS Anderton (SP-530), USS Lewes (SP-383) and James. Anderton is the middle ship, with her smokestack immediately behind her pilothouse.

James remained in European waters through the winter of 1918-1919. She departed Brest on 27 April 1919, bound for the U.S., but soon began encountering "boisterous weather" with increasing north westerly winds and a choppy sea. At 14:22, the escort commander, Captain (and future Commandant of the United States Coast Guard) Harry G. Hamlet, U.S. Coast Guard — in Marietta — ordered the group to return to Brest.

When it became evident that James was taking on more water than usual, she was directed to proceed to Brest without delay. Unfortunately, the "Menhaden fisherman" worked so much that her seams opened, allowing water to flood the engine rooms and affect the boiler fires — an occurrence that severely limited the ship's capacity to deal with the rising flood waters.

James — her predicament grave — signaled the nearby Macdonough and Rambler for aid. The former closed swiftly and unsuccessfully attempted to take the foundering minecraft in tow. The tug Penobscot managed to get a towline across to James the following morning and towed the ship for about 20 minutes before the line parted.

=== James sinks ===
By that point, the heavy seas were nearly swamping the ship. Marietta closed as close as was practicable in the gale and put over a line. Rigging up a ferry arrangement with a liferaft from James, the trawler's entire crew reached safety on board the gunboat by shortly after 08:00 on 28 April. Two hours later, James sank, 6 mi (9.7 km) off Armen Light. In effecting the rescue, Captain Hamlet displayed admirable seamanship and on 5 January 1920, he was awarded the Gold Lifesaving Medal.
