= USRC Pamlico =

Ship of the U.S. Revenue Cutter Service

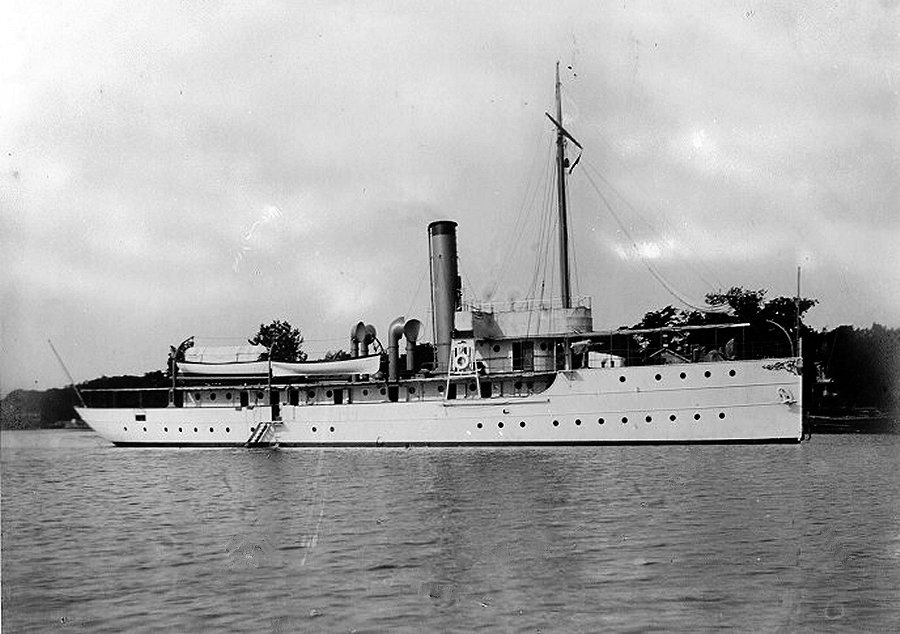
- USCGC Pamlico in the 1920s

History

→ United States
- Name: USRC Pamico
- Namesake: Pamlico Sound, North Carolina
- Operator: United States Revenue Cutter Service (1907–1915); U.S. Coast Guard (1915–17, 1919–1946); U.S. Navy (1917–19)
- Builder: Pusey & Jones, Wilmington, Delaware
- Cost: US$167,750
- Launched: 8 March 1907
- Commissioned: 27 July 1907
- Decommissioned: 6 September 1946
- Out of service: Sold, 7 July 1947
- Renamed: Charles W. Currett
- Identification: WPR-57 (U.S. Coast Guard)

General characteristics
- Displacement: 455 fl, (1907)
- Length: 158 ft (48 m)
- Beam: 30 ft (9.1 m)
- Draft: 5 ft 8 in (1.73 m)
- Installed power: 1 Babcock & Wilcox 600 SHP steam triple-expansion reciprocating
- Propulsion: twin screw
- Speed: 9.8 kn (18.1 km/h; 11.3 mph) max. sustained, (1907)
- Range: 817 nautical miles (1,513 km; 940 mi), (1907)
- Complement: 1 Officer; 2 warrant officers; 35 enlisted men (1907); 3 officers; 1 warrant; 33 enlisted (1945)
- Armament: 2 6-pounders

USRC Pamlico was a revenue cutter of the United States Revenue Cutter Service that served from 1907 to 1946 designed specifically to cruise inland waters and did so while stationed at New Bern, North Carolina her entire career.

== Construction ==
In 1896, the Revenue Cutter Service started designing the first steel-hulled cutters utilizing the service's own team of naval architects and engineers. Pamico was one of several steel-hulled cutters that were put into service after 1900 that featured characteristics more closely in line with U.S. Navy designs of the same time period. A US$167,750 contract was awarded to Pusey & Jones of Wilmington, Delaware in 1907 for the construction of Pamlico. She was of all steel construction and featured a shallow draft. The Babcock & Wilcox triple-expansion steam engine powered a twin screw that propelled the cutter along at a top speed of 9.8 kn (18.1 km/h; 11.3 mph) with a range of 817 nautical miles (1,513 km; 940 mi). Pamlico was the first Revenue Service cutter to have water-tube boilers installed in an engine room

== History ==
In preparation for the commissioning of Pamlico, the officers and crew of the newly decommissioned USRC Boutwell were transferred to Pamlico. She was placed in commission 26 July 1907 at Baltimore, Maryland. In June 1909, She intercepted steam launch Despatch and steamer Nanticoke in Albemarle Sound to prevent a violation of neutrality laws. When the Revenue Cutter Service and the United States Lifesaving Service combined in 1915 to form the United States Coast Guard, Pamilco became part of the new service and was thereafter known as USCGC Pamico. On 6 April 1917, with the declaration of war by congress, the U.S. Coast Guard was transferred to U.S. Navy control. Pamlico continued to serve in the Fifth Naval District as a training and recruiting ship for the Navy. In October 1917, she was assigned duties as a training ship in Chesapeake Bay to train naval officers being assigned to European waters and she continued that mission until her transfer back to Coast Guard control on 28 August 1919. By 1935, Pamlico was the oldest cutter on the active list of cutters in the Coast Guard. With the end of World War II, Pamlico was finally decommissioned along with other older cutters and they were replaced with surplus U.S. Navy ships. With the exception of a short period of service in the Chesapeake Bay during World War I, she had served her entire career in the North Carolina sounds. Pamlico was eventually sold and converted to a barge and later to a diesel powered freighter named Charles W. Currett.

== Notes ==
=== References used ===
- "Record of Movements, Vessels of the United States Coast Guard, 1790–December 31, 1933 (1989 reprint)" (PDF). U.S. Coast Guard Historian's Office.
- "U.S. Coast Guard General Order No.1" (PDF). Historic Documents & Publications. U.S. Coast Guard Historian's Office. Archived from the original (PDF) on 19 May 2017.
- Canney, Donald L. (1995). U.S. Coast Guard and Revenue Cutters, 1790–1935. Naval Institute Press, Annapolis, Maryland. ISBN 978-1-55750-101-1.
- Evans, Stephen H. (1949). The United States Coast Guard 1790–1915: A Definitive History. Naval Institute Press, Annapolis, Maryland. No ISBN
- Johnson, Robert Irwin (1987). Guardians of the Sea, History of the United States Coast Guard, 1915 to the Present. Naval Institute Press, Annapolis, Maryland. ISBN 978-0-87021-720-3.
- Larzelere, Alex (2003). The Coast Guard in World War I: An Untold Story. Naval Institute Press, Annapolis, Maryland. ISBN 978-1-55750-476-0.
- Scheina, Robert L. (1982). U.S. Coast Guard Cutters & Craft of World War II. Naval Institute Press, Annapolis, Maryland. ISBN 978-0-87021-717-3.
