= USS Marietta (PG-15) =

Gunboat of the United States Navy

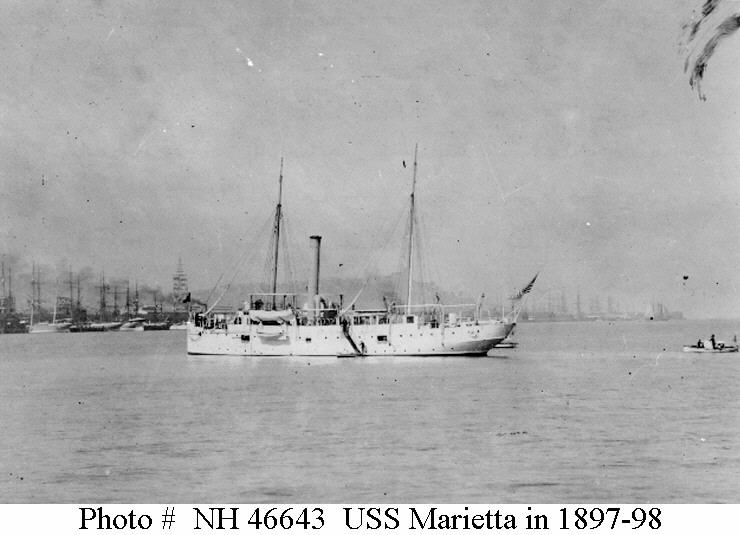
- USS Marietta (PG-15

History

United States
- Name: Marietta
- Builder: Union Iron Works, San Francisco
- Laid down: 13 April 1896
- Launched: 18 March 1897
- Commissioned: 1 September 1897
- Decommissioned: 12 July 1919
- Fate: Sold, 25 March 1920

General characteristics
- Type: Schooner-rigged gunboat
- Displacement: 1,000 long tons (1,000 t)
- Length: 189 ft 7 in (57.79 m)
- Beam: 34 ft (10 m)
- Draft: 12 ft (3.7 m)
- Propulsion: Steam engine/sail
- Speed: 13 kn (15 mph; 24 km/h)
- Complement: 140
- Armament: 6 × 4 in (100 mm) guns; 1 × 3 in (76 mm) gun; 4 × 6-pounder 57 mm (2.24 in)) guns; 2 × 1-pounder (37 mm (1.46 in)) guns; 1 × machine gun

USS Marietta was a schooner-rigged gunboat. She was laid down by Union Iron Works, San Francisco, California, on 13 April 1896 and launched on 18 March 1897, sponsored by Mrs. C. L. More, daughter of Brigadier General T. C. H. Smith and commissioned in September 1897.

== Service history ==
=== Spanish–American War ===
Following brief duty on the Pacific station, Marietta departed San Francisco on 19 March 1898 for Callao, Peru, to arrange for the coaling of the battleship Oregon which was steaming to join the North Atlantic Squadron off Cuba. Moving on to Valparaíso, Chile, on 31 March, the gunboat joined Oregon on 17 April in Punta Arenas, Chile, after having proceeded through the Straits of Magellan, and together the two warships proceeded up the east coast of South America, separating at Bahia, Brazil, on 11 May. She arrived at Key West, Florida on 4 June, then joined the blockade of Havana Harbor.

On 2 September, Marietta arrived at Boston for repairs and then sailed on 10 October for her second tour of duty off Cuba. For the next five months, she patrolled the Caribbean, showed the flag in Latin American ports, and helped clear mines from Cuban waters.

=== Philippine–American War ===
On 17 October, Marietta sailed from Virginia for the Philippines. Steaming via the Suez Canal, she arrived Manila on 3 January 1900. Operating in support of American forces ending the Philippine insurrection, the gunboat acted as a patrol and convoy escort vessel in the Islands, assisting and cooperating with the Army In military expeditions and landings until ordered home on 3 June 1901. Again sailing via Suez, she arrived Boston on 17 September and then proceeded immediately to Portsmouth, New Hampshire reporting to the North Atlantic Squadron.

On 21 November, Marietta cleared Portsmouth, sailing via New York for another tour of duty in the Caribbean. Arriving Colón, Colombia on the 23rd, she spent the next year and five months cruising on this station, protecting American interests in Colombia, Haiti, Jamaica, Venezuela, Trinidad, Curaçao, and Honduras, in addition to carrying mail for American legation officials. She completed her duty 10 April 1903, and sailed for home, returning to Boston 16 days later. Marietta decommissioned at Boston on 6 May.

=== Panama ===
Marietta recommissioned on 11 February 1904, and sailed for Panama on 9 March. She operated off Central America, protecting American interests in Panama during that nations revolution against Colombia. On 24 June, the ship arrived at Gibraltar, and reported for duty with the European Squadron. She remained in foreign waters, alternating duty with this and the South Atlantic Squadron until 4 December, when she sailed for League Island, Pennsylvania, arriving on 31 December, and decommissioning on 21 January 1905.

=== Caribbean ===
Marietta recommissioned on 14 May 1906 and departed League Island on the 26th for the West Indies. For the next 5½ years, she served in the islands of the Caribbean, calling at numerous Latin American ports and protecting American lives and property from damage.

On 4 November 1911, Marietta reported to Portsmouth, N.H., to go into reserve. On 27 May 1912, she was turned over to the New Jersey Naval Militia and two days later was placed in full commission at New York Navy Yard. For the next two years, she operated in the Caribbean and western Atlantic, enforcing American neutrality. In February 1916, she joined American forces off Veracruz to assist in operations against Mexican insurgents.

=== World War I ===
Marietta returned to the U.S. shortly before the start of World War I, and soon after joined the Atlantic Fleet patrol force for convoy duty. Continuing her escort service, she was assigned to the European patrol force in 1918. While under the command of Captain Harry G. Hamlet, U.S. Coast Guard, in the Bay of Biscay on 28 April 1919, Marietta rescued 47 crewmen from the patrol vessel James which was sinking at sea. This rescue was made extremely difficult and hazardous owing to high seas, which threatened to send the two vessels crashing together. In effecting the rescue, Captain Hamlet displayed admirable seamanship and on 5 January 1920, he was awarded the Gold Lifesaving Medal. She decommissioned on 12 July 1919 at New Orleans, Louisiana. Marietta was sold on 25 March 1920.

== Awards ==
- Sampson Medal
- Spanish Campaign Medal
- Philippine Campaign Medal
- Mexican Service Medal
- Haitian Campaign Medal
- Victory Medal with "PATROL" clasp
