= USS Cushing (DD-55) =

O'Brien-class destroyer

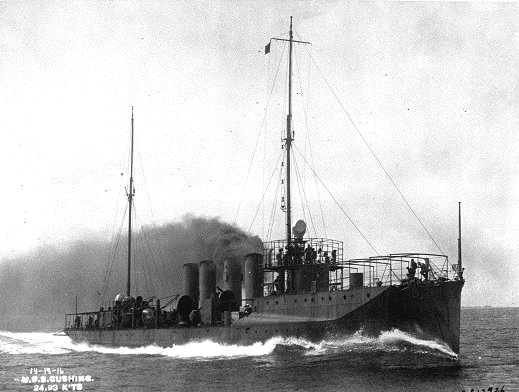
- USS Cushing (DD-55), steaming at 24.93 knots during builder's trials, 25 May 1915. Note that her guns and torpedo tubes have not yet been installed.

History

United States
- Name: Cushing
- Namesake: Commander William B. Cushing
- Ordered: March 1913
- Builder: Fore River Shipbuilding Company; Quincy, Massachusetts
- Cost: $891,626.54 (hull and machinery)
- Yard number: 215
- Laid down: 23 September 1913
- Launched: 15 January 1915
- Sponsored by: Miss M. L. Cushing
- Commissioned: 14 August 1915
- Decommissioned: 7 August 1920
- Renamed: DD-55, 1 July 1933
- Stricken: 7 January 1936
- Identification: Hull symbol:DD-55; Code letters:NIM
- Fate: Sold on 30 June 1936 and scrapped

General characteristics
- Class & type: O'Brien-class destroyer
- Displacement: 1,050 long tons (1,070 t); 1,171 long tons (1,190 t) fully loaded
- Length: 305 ft 3 in (93.04 m)
- Beam: 31 ft 1 in (9.47 m)
- Draft: 9 ft 6 in (2.90 m) (mean); 10 ft 7 in (3.23 m) max
- Installed power: 4 × White-Forster boilers; 17,000 shp (13,000 kW)
- Propulsion: 2 × Zoelly direct-drive steam turbines; 2 × screw propellers
- Speed: 29 kn (33 mph; 54 km/h); 29 kn (33 mph; 54 km/h) (Speed on Trial)
- Complement: 5 officers 96 enlisted
- Armament: 4 × 4 in (100 mm)/50 caliber guns; 8 × 21 inch (533 mm) torpedo tubes (4 × 2)

USS Cushing (Destroyer No. 55/DD-55) was an O'Brien-class destroyer built for the United States Navy prior to the American entry into World War I. The ship was the second U.S. Navy vessel named in honor of William B. Cushing, a U.S. Navy officer best known for sinking the Confederate ironclad warship CSS Albemarle during the American Civil War.

Cushing was laid down by the Fore River Shipbuilding Company of Quincy, Massachusetts, in September 1913 and launched in January 1915. The ship was a little more than 305 feet (93 m) in length, just over 31 feet (9.4 m) abeam, and had a standard displacement of 1,050 long tons (1,070 t). She was armed with four 4-inch (102 mm) guns and had eight 21 inch (533 mm) torpedo tubes. Cushing was powered by a pair of steam turbines that propelled her at up to 29 knots (54 km/h).

After her August 1915 commissioning, Cushing sailed off the east coast and in the Caribbean. She was one of seventeen destroyers sent out to rescue survivors from five victims of German submarine U-53 off the Lightship Nantucket in October 1916. After the United States entered World War I in April 1917, Cushing was sent overseas to patrol the Irish Sea out of Queenstown, Ireland. Cushing made several unsuccessful attacks on U-boats, and rescued survivors of several ships sunk by the German craft.

Upon returning to the United States after the war, Cushing was placed in reserve in reduced commission. She was decommissioned at Philadelphia in August 1920. She was struck from the Naval Vessel Register in January 1936 and sold for scrapping in June.

== Design and construction ==
Cushing was authorized in March 1913 as the fifth of six ships of the O'Brien class, which was an improved version of the Cassin-class destroyers authorized in 1911. Construction of the vessel was awarded to the Fore River Shipbuilding Company of Quincy, Massachusetts, which laid down her keel on 23 September 1913. On 16 January 1915, Cushing was launched by sponsor Miss M. L. Cushing, daughter of the ship's namesake, William B. Cushing. The ship was the second ship named for Cushing, a U.S. Navy officer best known for sinking the Confederate ironclad warship Albemarle during the American Civil War. As built, the destroyer was 305 feet 3 inches (93.04 m) in length overall, 31 feet 1 inch (9.47 m) abeam, and drew 9 feet 6 inches (2.90 m). The ship had a standard displacement of 1,050 long tons (1,070 t) and displaced 1,171 long tons (1,190 t) when fully loaded.

Cushing had two Zoelly steam turbines that drove her two screw propellers, and an additional pair triple-expansion steam engines, each connected to one of the propeller shafts, for cruising purposes. Four oil-burning White-Forster boilers powered the engines, which could generate 17,000 shaft horsepower (13,000 kW), moving the ship at up to 29 knots (54 km/h). Cushing reached a maximum speed of 30.59 knots (56.65 km/h; 35.20 mph) during sea trials on 25 May 1916, with her engines running at 16,621 horsepower (12,394 kW).

Cushing's main battery consisted of 4 × 4 in (100 mm)/50 caliber Mark 9 guns, (Note: The 50 denotes the length of the gun barrels; in this case, the gun is 50 calibers, meaning that the gun is 50 times as long as its bore, or 200 inches (5.1 m) in this case. The Mark number is the version of the gun; in this case, the ninth U.S. Navy design of the 4-inch/50 gun.) with each gun weighing in excess of 6,100 pounds (2,800 kg). The guns fired 33-pound (15 kg) armor-piercing projectiles at 2,900 feet per second (880 m/s). At an elevation of 20°, the guns had a range of 15,920 yards (14,560 m).

Cushing was also equipped with eight 21-inch (533 mm) torpedo tubes. The General Board of the United States Navy had called for two anti-aircraft guns for the O'Brien-class ships, as well as provisions for laying up to 36 floating mines. From sources, it is unclear if these recommendations were followed for Cushing or any of the other ships of the class.

== Early career ==
USS Cushing was commissioned into the United States Navy on 21 August 1915. Cushing served on the Neutrality patrol off Rose Bank, New York, until 28 December 1915. She sailed to the Caribbean for fleet maneuvers on 4 January 1916 and after joining in fleet tactical exercises off Portland, Maine, and gunnery exercises off Norfolk, Virginia, she reported to Newport, Rhode Island, on 27 September to test torpedoes at the Naval Torpedo Station.

At 05:30 on Sunday, 8 October 1916, wireless reports came in of a German submarine stopping ships near the Lightship Nantucket, off the eastern end of Long Island. After an SOS from the British steamer West Point was received at about 12:30, Rear Admiral Albert Gleaves ordered Cushing and other destroyers at Newport to attend to survivors. (Note: According to a report in The New York Times on 9 October the other ships, in addition to Cushing, were the flotilla's destroyer tender, Melville, and fifteen other destroyers: Aylwin, Balch, Benham, Cassin, Conyngham, Cummings, Drayton, Ericsson, Fanning, Jarvis, McCall, O'Brien, Paulding, Porter, Winslow. A firsthand account of the events by the quartermaster of destroyer McDougal, published on 22 October 1916, indicates that ship was present as well. For the initial report, see: "Newport aroused by U-boat's raid" (PDF). The New York Times. 9 October 1916. p. 2. For the account of McDougal's quartermaster, see: "United States sailor describes rescue of U-53's victims" (PDF). The New York Times. 22 October 1916. p. X1.) The American destroyers arrived on the scene about 17:00 when the U-boat, U-53 under the command of Kapitänleutnant Hans Rose, (Note: U-53 had called at Newport on 7 October 1916, the day before the attacks, to drop off a letter for Johann Heinrich von Bernstorff, the German Ambassador to the United States, and had exchanged courtesy visits with Admirals Albert Gleaves and Austin M. Knight before departing.) was in the process of stopping the Holland-America Line cargo ship Blommersdijk. Shortly after, U-53 stopped the British passenger ship Stephano. After Rose had given passengers and crew aboard both ships adequate time to abandon them, he sank the pair. In total, 226 survivors from U-53's five victims (Note: 'U-53 had sunk three other ships earlier in the same vicinity: British cargo ships West Point and Strathdene, and the Norwegian tanker Christian Knutsen.) were rescued by the destroyer flotilla.

After finishing out the rest of 1916 at Newport, Cushing again joined in exercises in the Caribbean for the first three months of 1917.

== World War I ==
After the United States declared war on Germany on 6 April 1917 entering World War I, Cushing was put to sea from New York on 15 May 1917 with Cummings, Nicholson, O'Brien, and Sampson. The destroyers arrived at Queenstown, Ireland, 24 May for duty in the war zone.

Cushing patrolled off the Irish coast, meeting and escorting convoys of merchant ships and troop transports to British ports and the French coast. German submarines were active in the area and Cushing conducted antisubmarine patrols and performed rescue work on the ships that were victims of U-boats. On 4 June, she picked up 13 men adrift in a small boat, survivors of Italian brig Luisa.

The destroyer had a busy July. On the 7th, she assisted Perkins in rescuing survivors of the torpedoed and sinking British merchant ship SS Tarquah. The next day she responded to an SOS from SS Onitsha, which was being chased by an enemy submarine, and picked up 54 survivors of SS Obuasi which had already been sunk. On 16 July she escorted SS Tamele to safety after the merchantman had received five hits, and the same day fired on two submarines, U-49 and U-58, at extremely long range following their attack on the Italian merchant vessel SS Lamia L., from whom Cushing rescued 27 survivors.

On 12 September, five survivors from the British SS Vienna were saved after being adrift for 2 days. (Note: Coincidentally, Vienna had been sunk by U-49, upon which Cushing had fired unsuccessfully in July. See: Helgason, Guðmundur. "Ships hit during WWI: Vienna". German and Austrian U-boats of World War I - Kaiserliche Marine - Uboat.net.) On 26 November, when RFA Crenella was torpedoed, Cushing stood by, giving damage control assistance which kept the merchantman from sinking, then escorted her into Queenstown. Cushing rejoined her convoy the next day. Continuing her convoy escort and patrol duty, Cushing on 25 April 1918 dropped fifteen depth charges on German submarine U-104, damaging her severely; HMS Jessamine sank U-104 later that same day. After 11 June 1918, Cushing operated from Brest, France, escorting eleven troop convoys through the submarine zones into French ports, making two depth charge attacks without success in the process.

== Postwar ==
Immediately after the Armistice was signed on 11 November 1918, Cushing remained in French waters. She towed Murray, which had grounded on rocks in a French harbor, into Brest on 3 December. However, Cushing departed for the United States on 21 December, arriving in New York on 6 January 1919. She was placed in reduced commission on 1 July, and transferred to the Philadelphia Navy Yard on 6 April 1920. In July, she was assigned the hull code of DD-55 under the U.S. Navy's alphanumeric classification system. Cushing was decommissioned on 7 August.

On 1 July 1933, she dropped the name Cushing to free it for a new destroyer of the same name, becoming known only as DD-55. The ship was struck from the Naval Vessel Register on 7 January 1936, and, on 30 June, was sold for scrapping in accordance with the London Naval Treaty for the limitation of naval armaments.

== Bibliography ==
- Bauer, K. Jack; Roberts, Stephen S. (1991). Register of Ships of the U.S. Navy, 1775–1990: Major Combatants. New York: Greenwood Press. ISBN 978-0-313-26202-9. OCLC 24010356.
- Cox, Ormond L. (November 1915). "U.S.S. Cushing: Description and Trials". Journal of the American Society of Naval Engineers. XXVII (4): 836–852.
- Gardiner, Robert; Gray, Randal, eds. (1985). Conway's All the World's Fighting Ships 1906–1921. Annapolis, Maryland: Naval Institute Press. ISBN 978-0-87021-907-8. OCLC 12119866.
- Long, Wellington (October 1966). "The Cruise of the U-53". Proceedings. Vol. 92, no. 10. Annapolis, Maryland: United States Naval Institute. pp. 89–94. ISSN 0041-798X. OCLC 2496995.
- Naval History & Heritage Command. "Cummings". Dictionary of American Naval Fighting Ships. Navy Department, Naval History and Heritage Command.
- Naval History & Heritage Command. "Cushing". Dictionary of American Naval Fighting Ships. Navy Department, Naval History & Heritage Command.
- Naval History & Heritage Command. "Nicholson". Dictionary of American Naval Fighting Ships. Navy Department, Naval History & Heritage Command.
- Naval History & Heritage Command. "O'Brien". Dictionary of American Naval Fighting Ships. Navy Department, Naval History & Heritage Command.
- Naval History & Heritage Command. "Sampson". Dictionary of American Naval Fighting Ships. Navy Department, Naval History & Heritage Command.
