= USS O'Brien (DD-51) =

Lead ship in O'Brien-class

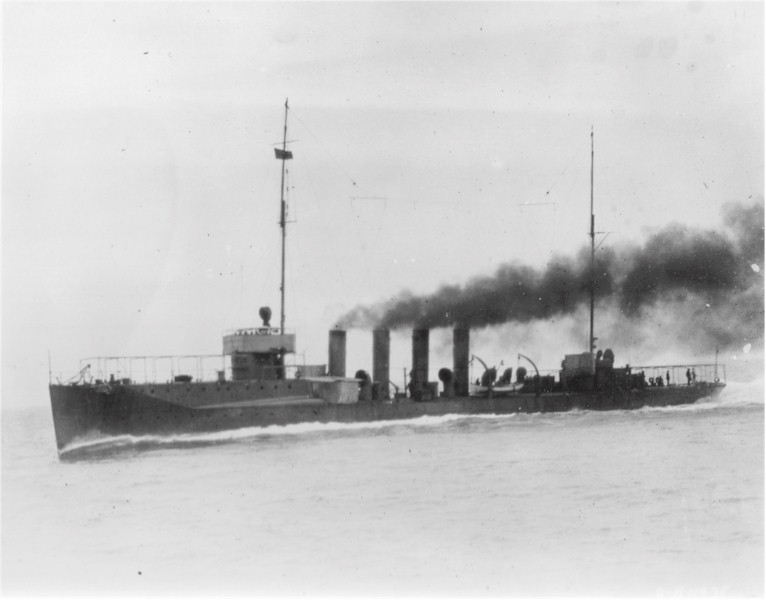
- USS O'Brien, during trials in 1915.

History

United States
- Name: O'Brien
- Namesake: Captain Jeremiah O'Brien of the Massachusetts Naval Militia and his five brothers.
- Ordered: March 1913
- Builder: William Cramp & Sons, Philadelphia
- Cost: $863,984.51 (hull and machinery)
- Yard number: 404
- Laid down: 8 September 1913
- Launched: 20 July 1914
- Sponsored by: Miss Marcia Bradbury Campbell
- Commissioned: 22 May 1915
- Decommissioned: 5 June 1922
- Stricken: 8 March 1935
- Identification: Hull symbol:DD-51; Code letters:NIV
- Fate: Sold on 23 April 1935 and scrapped

General characteristics
- Class & type: O'Brien-class destroyer
- Displacement: 1,050 long tons (1,070 t); 1,171 long tons (1,190 t) fully loaded
- Length: 305 ft 3 in (93.04 m)
- Beam: 31 ft 1 in (9.47 m)
- Draft: 9 ft 5 in (2.87 m) (mean); 10 ft 7 in (3.23 m) max
- Installed power: 4 × White-Forster boilers; 17,000 shp (13,000 kW)
- Propulsion: 2 × Zoelly direct-drive steam turbines; 2 × screw propellers
- Speed: 29 kn (33 mph; 54 km/h); 29.17 kn (33.57 mph; 54.02 km/h) (Speed on Trial)
- Complement: 5 officers 96 enlisted
- Armament: 4 × 4 in (100 mm)/50 caliber guns; 8 × 21 inch (533 mm) torpedo tubes (4 × 2)

USS O'Brien (Destroyer No. 51/DD-51) was the lead ship of O'Brien-class destroyers built for the United States Navy prior to the American entry into World War I. The ship was the second US Navy vessel named in honor of Jeremiah O'Brien and his five brothers Gideon, John, William, Dennis, and Joseph who, together on the sloop Unity, captured a British warship during the American Revolutionary War.

O'Brien was laid down by William Cramp & Sons of Philadelphia in September 1913 and launched in July 1914.

After her May 1915 commissioning, O'Brien sailed off the east coast and in the Caribbean. She was one of seventeen destroyers sent out to rescue survivors from five victims of German submarine U-53 off the Lightship Nantucket in October 1916. After the United States entered World War I in April 1917, O'Brien was sent overseas to patrol the Irish Sea out of Queenstown, Ireland.

After returning to the United States in January 1919, O'Brien revisited European waters in May to serve as one of the picket ships for the NC-type seaplanes in the first aerial crossing of the Atlantic. O'Brien was decommissioned at Philadelphia in June 1922. She was struck from the Naval Vessel Register in March 1935 and sold for scrapping in April.

== Design and construction ==
O'Brien was authorized in March 1913 as the lead ship of the O'Brien class, which was an improved version of the Cassin-class destroyers authorized in 1911. Construction of the vessel was awarded to William Cramp & Sons of Philadelphia which laid down her keel on 8 September 1913. On 20 July 1914, O'Brien was launched by sponsor Miss Marcia Bradbury Campbell, great-great-granddaughter of Gideon O'Brien, one of the ship's namesakes. Gideon and his four brothers—John, William, Dennis, and Joseph—were crewmen aboard sloop Unity, under the command of their brother Jeremiah O'Brien, when that vessel captured HMS Margaretta on 12 June 1775 during the American Revolutionary War; the destroyer O'Brien was named after all six brothers, and was the second US Navy vessel named in their honor. As built, the destroyer was 305 ft 3 in (93.04 m) in length, 31 ft 1 in (9.47 m) abeam, and drew 9 ft 6 in (2.90 m). The ship had a standard displacement of 1,050 long tons (1,070 t) and displaced 1,171 long tons (1,190 t) when fully loaded.

O'Brien had two Zoelly steam turbines that drove her two screw propellers, and an additional pair triple-expansion steam engines, each connected to one of the propeller shafts, for cruising purposes. Four oil-burning White-Forster boilers powered the engines, which could generate 17,000 shaft horsepower (13,000 kW), moving the ship at up to 29 knots (54 km/h).

O'Brien's main battery consisted of four 4 in (100 mm)/50 caliber Mark 9 guns, (Note: The 50 denotes the length of the gun barrels; in this case, the gun is 50 calibers, meaning that the gun is 50 times as long as its bore, or 200 inches (5.1 m) in this case. The Mark number is the version of the gun; in this case, the ninth US Navy design of the 4-inch/50 gun.) with each gun weighing in excess of 6,100 lb (2,800 kg). The guns fired 33 lb (15 kg) armor-piercing projectiles at 2,900 ft/s (880 m/s). At an elevation of 20°, the guns had a range of 15,920 yd (14,560 m).

O'Brien was also equipped with four twin 21 inch (533 mm) torpedo tubes. The General Board of the United States Navy had called for two anti-aircraft guns for the O'Brien-class ships, as well as provisions for laying up to 36 floating mines. From sources, it is unclear if these recommendations were followed for O'Brien or any of the other ships of the class.

== Pre-World War I ==
O'Brien was commissioned into the United States Navy on 22 May 1915 after which she conducted her shakedown cruise between Newport, Rhode Island, and Hampton Roads, Virginia. In fleet exercises off New York in November, O'Brien collided with the destroyer Drayton, in a minor incident that carried away part of Drayton's topmast and wireless gear. In December, she was assigned to the 5th Division, Torpedo Flotilla, Atlantic Fleet. From early 1916-spring of 1917, she operated with the Fleet along the East Coast and in Cuban waters.

At 05:30 on 8 October 1916, wireless reports came in of a German submarine stopping ships near the Lightship Nantucket, off the eastern end of Long Island. After an SOS from the British steamer SS West Point was received at about 12:30, Rear Admiral Albert Gleaves ordered O'Brien and other destroyers at Newport to attend to survivors. (Note: According to a report in The New York Times on 9 October the other ships, in addition to O'Brien, were the flotilla's destroyer tender, Melville, and fifteen other destroyers: Aylwin, Balch, Benham, Cassin, Conyngham, Cummings, Cushing, Drayton, Ericsson, Fanning, Jarvis, McCall, Paulding, Porter, and Winslow. A firsthand account of the events by a quartermaster from destroyer McDougal, published on 22 October 1916, indicates that ship was present as well.)

The American destroyers arrived on the scene at about 17:00 when the U-boat, U-53 under the command of Kapitänleutnant Hans Rose, (Note: U-53 had called at Newport on 7 October 1916, the day before the attacks, to drop off a letter for Johann Heinrich von Bernstorff, the German Ambassador to the United States, and had exchanged courtesy visits with Admirals Albert Gleaves and Austin M. Knight before departing.) was in the process of stopping the Holland-America Line cargo ship Blommersdijk. Shortly after, U-53 stopped the British passenger ship Stephano. As Rose had done with three other ships U-53 had sunk earlier in the day, (Note: The other three ships were the British cargo ships West Point and Strathdene, and the Norwegian tanker Christian Knutsen.) he gave passengers and crew aboard Blommersdijk and Stephano adequate time to abandon the ships before sinking the pair. In total, 226 survivors from U-53's five victims were rescued by the destroyer flotilla.

In February 1917, one of O'Brien's gun crews hit a target at 5,000 yd (4,600 m) eight times in eight attempts with one of the destroyer's 4 in (100 mm) guns, a feat which earned the crew and O'Brien recognition in The Independent, a weekly newsmagazine published in Boston.

== World War I ==
Returning from winter maneuvers off Cuba in March 1917, the ship was in the York River when the United States declared war on Germany on 6 April, entering World War I. After fitting out at Brooklyn Navy Yard, she got underway from New York on 15 May with Cummings, Nicholson, Cushing, and Sampson, and joined convoy at Halifax, Nova Scotia, en route to Ireland. Upon arrival at Queenstown on 24 May, O'Brien was assigned to the 6th Destroyer Division which cooperated with the British forces. She patrolled off the Irish coast in company with other destroyers answering distress calls and meeting eastbound convoys to escort them through the war zone.

While escorting SS Elysia 12 nmi (14 mi; 22 km) off Queenstown on 16 June, lookouts on O'Brien sighted a periscope. Heading toward the submarine for an attack, a lookout in the foretop saw the submerged boat pass close along the starboard side. A depth charge was dropped but no immediate evidence of damage was found. Nearly three hours later, the British vessel HMS Jessamine reported a large patch of oil in approximately the same position. The next morning, Cushing also reported and confirmed Jessamine's report. The British Admiralty believed the submarine was probably seriously damaged. However, later investigation reveals that German submarine U-16, the submarine in question, continued to operate and completed her cruise.

In the summer of 1918, O'Brien was transferred to the French coast where she continued her antisubmarine patrols through the end of the war.

== Inter-war period ==
After the signing of the Armistice on 11 November, which ended all fighting, O'Brien transported mail and passengers between Brest, France, and Plymouth, England. She returned to New York on 8 January 1919, but returned to European waters in May when she served as one of the rescue pickets stationed along the route across the Atlantic flown by three Navy NC-type seaplanes in the first aerial crossing of the Atlantic.

In 1919, she assisted in the unsuccessful first attempt to lay the Ambrose Channel pilot cable. In July 1920, she was assigned the hull code of DD-51 under the US Navy's alphanumeric classification system. O'Brien was decommissioned at Philadelphia on 5 June 1922. The ship was struck from the Naval Vessel Register on 8 March 1935, and broken up at the Philadelphia Navy Yard, and her materials sold for scrap on 23 April. The ship's bell remains in the Plattsburgh Memorial Chapel on the former Plattsburgh Air Force Base.
