= USS Aylwin (DD-47) =

Aylwin-class destroyer

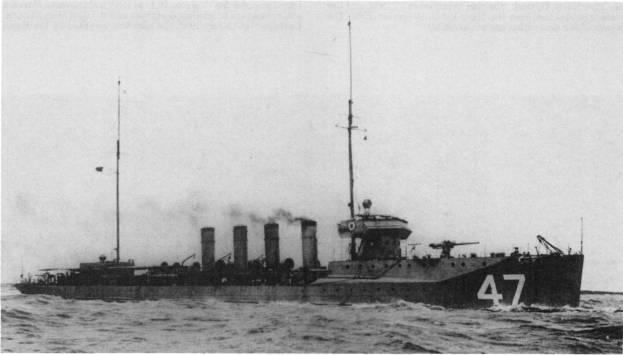
- USS Aylwin (DD-47) underway, circa 1916-1917.

History

United States
- Name: Aylwin
- Namesake: John Cushing Aylwin
- Ordered: March 1911
- Builder: William Cramp & Sons; Philadelphia
- Cost: $781,279.54 (hull and machinery)
- Yard number: 383
- Laid down: 7 March 1912
- Launched: 23 November 1912
- Sponsored by: Mrs. Joseph Wright Powell
- Commissioned: 17 January 1914
- Decommissioned: c. April 1914
- Recommissioned: 25 May 1915
- Renamed: DD-47, 1 July 1933
- Decommissioned: 23 February 1921
- Stricken: 8 March 1935
- Identification: Hull symbol:DD-47; Code letters:NIH
- Fate: scrapped after 23 April 1935

General characteristics
- Class & type: Aylwin-class destroyer
- Displacement: 1,036 long tons (1,053 t)
- Length: 305 ft 3 in (93.04 m)
- Beam: 30 ft 4 in (9.25 m)
- Draft: 9 ft 5 in (2.87 m) (mean)
- Installed power: 4 × boilers; 16,000 shp (12,000 kW)
- Propulsion: 2 × direct-drive steam turbines; 2 × screw propellers
- Speed: 29.5 kn (33.9 mph; 54.6 km/h); 29.6 kn (34.1 mph; 54.8 km/h) (Speed on Trial)
- Complement: 5 officers 96 enlisted
- Armament: 4 × 4 in (100 mm)/50 caliber guns; 8 × 18 inch (450 mm) torpedo tubes (4 × 2); 2 × 0.30 in (7.62 mm) machine guns

USS Aylwin (Destroyer No. 47/DD-47) was the lead ship of Aylwin-class destroyers built for the United States Navy prior to the American entry into World War I. The ship was the second U.S. Navy vessel named in honor of John Cushing Aylwin, a U.S. Navy officer killed in action aboard Constitution during the War of 1812.

Aylwin was laid down by She was sponsored by Mrs. Joseph Wright Powell. The ship was a little more than 305 ft (93 m) in length, just over 30 ft (9.1 m) abeam, and had a standard displacement of 1,036 long tons (1,053 t). She was armed with four 4 in (100 mm) guns and had eight 18-inch (450 mm) torpedo tubes. Aylwin was powered by a pair of steam turbines that propelled her at up to 29.5 kn (33.9 mph; 54.6 km/h)

Aylwin failed to make her contracted speed of 29.5 kn (33.9 mph; 54.6 km/h) in builder's trials in August 1913, but was eventually accepted by the U.S. Navy and commissioned in January 1914. On 6 April, two sailors on board Aylwin died when she suffered an explosion in her No. 1 fire room. Out of commission while repairs were made, Aylwin was recommissioned in May 1915 and joined the Atlantic Fleet. In October 1916, she was one of several U.S. destroyers sent to rescue survivors from five victims of German submarine U-53 off the Lightship Nantucket.

After the United States entered World War I in April 1917, Aylwin conducted experiments with Reginald Fessenden until January 1918. She was then sent overseas to conduct anti-submarine patrols from Queenstown, Ireland, and Plymouth. In December, she accompanied light cruiser Chester on an inspection tour of German Baltic ports. Upon returning to the United States at the end of June 1919, Aylwin was placed in reserve. She was decommissioned at Philadelphia in February 1921. In July 1933 she dropped her name, becoming known only as DD-47. She was struck from the Naval Vessel Register in March 1935 and ordered scrapped in April.

== Design and construction ==
Aylwin was authorized in March 1911 as the lead ship of the four-ship Aylwin class, which was almost identical to the Cassin-class destroyers authorized at the same time. (Note: The Aylwin class is considered a part of the Cassin class by Conway's All the World's Fighting Ships 1906–1921 (p. 122), but is classed separately by the United States Navy. See, for example, Naval History & Heritage Command. "Aylwin". Dictionary of American Naval Fighting Ships. Navy Department, Naval History and Heritage Command.) Construction of the vessel—like her three sister ships—was awarded to William Cramp & Sons of Philadelphia which laid down her keel on 7 May 1912. On 23 November, Aylwin was launched by sponsor Mrs. Joseph Wright Powell, wife of the assistant to the president of the Cramp shipyard. The ship was the second U.S. Navy ship named for John Cushing Aylwin, a U.S. Navy officer killed in action aboard Constitution during the War of 1812. As built, the destroyer was 305 ft 3 in (93.04 m) in length, 30 ft 4 in (9.25 m) abeam, and drew 9 ft 5 in (2.87 m). The ship had a standard displacement of 1,036 long tons (1,053 t) and displaced 1,235 long tons (1,255 t) when fully loaded.

Aylwin had two steam turbines that drove her two screw propellers, and an additional pair triple-expansion steam engines, each connected to one of the propeller shafts, for cruising purposes. Four oil-burning boilers powered the engines, which could generate 16,000 shp (12,000 kW), and it was hoped, move the ship at the design speed of 29.5 kn (33.9 mph; 54.6 km/h). However, during builder's trials conducted in July 1913, Aylwin failed to reach this speed, and was withdrawn from testing. After sister ship Parker exceeded the design speed in August with a different propeller design, The Washington Post reported that Aylwin's propellers would be changed to the new design.

Aylwin's main battery consisted of four 4 in (100 mm)/50 caliber Mark 9 guns, (Note: The 50 denotes the length of the gun barrels; in this case, the gun is 50 calibers, meaning that the gun is 50 times as long as its bore, or 200 in (5.1 m) in this case. The Mark number is the version of the gun; in this case, the ninth U.S. Navy design of the 4-inch/50 gun.) with each gun weighing in excess of 6,100 lb (2,800 kg). The guns fired 33 lb (15 kg) armor-piercing projectiles at 2,900 ft/s (880 m/s). At an elevation of 20°, the guns had a range of 15,920 yd (14,560 m). Aylwin was also equipped with four twin 18 in (460 mm) torpedo tubes.

== Pre-World War I ==
Aylwin was commissioned into the U.S. Navy on 17 January 1914. Following a short cruise to Cuba, Aylwin conducted operations off the North Carolina coast in April. On 6 April, she and sister ships Benham and Parker were exercising off the North Carolina coast, about 15 nautical miles (28 km) off the Diamond Shoals lightship. An explosion ripped through the forward fire room on Aylwin, injuring three men. Benham loaded the three wounded sailors and sped to the naval hospital at Norfolk, Virginia, while Parker took on the remainder of Aylwin's crew. One of the injured men died on Benham before landfall was made in Virginia; another died a short time later. The crews of all three destroyers raised $250 to help defray funeral expenses for the widow of one of the men.

Aylwin remained afloat but, unmanned, was towed into Norfolk by Parker and U.S. Navy tug Sonoma, arriving on 7 April. According to a report in The Washington Post, Aylwin made it to port with only five hours of buoyancy to spare. The report described the fore deck of the ship as "badly rent and torn up" and noted that two of the destroyer's four stacks were knocked out of alignment by the blast, with one askew at a 25° angle from its normal position. The newspaper speculated that faulty metal in the No. 1 boiler's mud drum was the cause of the explosion. Although repairs were estimated to take roughly three months, Aylwin was placed out of commission and remained inactive for more than a year at the Norfolk Navy Yard.

She was recommissioned on 25 May 1915 and assigned to the 6th Division, Torpedo Flotilla, Atlantic Fleet. The ship then cruised along the east coast carrying out routine patrols. Prior to the entrance of the United States into World War I, she served on Neutrality Patrols, trying to protect American and neutral-flagged merchant ships from interference by British or German warships and U-boats. In the course of performing those duties, Aylwin was at Newport, Rhode Island in early October 1916. At 05:30 on 8 October, wireless reports came in of a German submarine stopping ships near the Lightship Nantucket, off the eastern end of Long Island. After an SOS from the British steamer West Point was received at about 12:30, Rear Admiral Albert Gleaves ordered Aylwin and other destroyers at Newport to attend to survivors. (Note: According to a report in The New York Times on 9 October the other ships, in addition to Aylwin, were the flotilla's destroyer tender, Melville, and 15 other destroyers: Balch, Benham, Cassin, Conyngham, Cummings, Cushing, Drayton, Ericsson, Fanning, Jarvis, McCall, O'Brien, Paulding, Porter, and Winslow. A firsthand account of the events by a quartermaster from destroyer McDougal, published on 22 October, indicates that ship was present as well. For the initial report, see: "Newport aroused by U-boat's raid" (PDF). The New York Times. 9 October 1916. p. 2. For the account of McDougal's quartermaster, see: "United States sailor describes rescue of U-53's victims" (PDF). The New York Times. 22 October 1916. p. X1.) The American destroyers arrived on the scene about 17:00 when the U-boat, U-53 under the command of Kapitänleutnant Hans Rose, (Note: U-53 had called at Newport on 7 October 1916, the day before the attacks, to drop off a letter for Johann Heinrich von Bernstorff, the German Ambassador to the United States, and had exchanged courtesy visits with Admirals Albert Gleaves and Austin M. Knight before departing.) was in the process of stopping the Holland-America Line cargo ship Blommersdijk. Shortly after, U-53 stopped the British passenger ship Stephano. As Rose had done with three other ships, U-53 had sunk earlier in the day, (Note: The other three ships were the British cargo ships West Point and Strathdene, and the Norwegian tanker Christian Knutsen.) he gave passengers and crew aboard Blommersdijk and Stephano adequate time to abandon the ships before sinking the pair. At one point, Rose signaled Aylwin requesting that she move out of the way to allow Stephano to be torpedoed, much to the later chagrin of Lord Beresford, who denounced Aylwin's compliance as "aiding and abetting" the Germans in a speech in the House of Lords. In total, 226 survivors from U-53's five victims were rescued by the destroyer flotilla. Aylwin picked up the crew of Stephano and a number of passengers, later transferring them to destroyer Jenkins for return to Newport.

During the early months of 1917, Aylwin sailed to Cuban waters for winter maneuvers and returned to the Virginia capes area upon America's entry into World War I.

== World War I ==
From June 1917-January 1918, the destroyer participated in special experimental work with Reginald Fessenden while operating out of Boston, Massachusetts, and Newport, Rhode Island. On 4 January 1918, Aylwin sailed for Queenstown, Ireland; and, shortly after her arrival there, began patrolling out of that port. However, shortly thereafter, she was detached to join British forces operating from Portsmouth and Devonport in conducting antisubmarine patrols.

Aylwin remained in European waters following the end of the war. On 26 December 1918, she sailed in company with light cruiser Chester for an inspection tour of the Baltic ports of Germany. The ships, which, were operating under the auspices of the Inter-Allied Naval Armistice Commission, were to remove any American prisoners of war or citizens discovered in the German ports.

== Postwar ==
In May 1919, the base of operations for U.S. destroyers in European waters was shifted from Brest, France, to Antwerp, and Aylwin, arriving there on 22 May, was the first ship to relocated to the Belgian port. The following month, Aylwin returned to Brest, and departed from there for the United States, arriving at New York on 26 June. She then proceeded to the Philadelphia Navy Yard where she was placed in reserve.

Aylwin was decommissioned at Philadelphia on 23 February 1921. On 1 July 1933, she dropped the name Aylwin to free it for a new destroyer of the same name, becoming known only as DD-47. The ship was struck from the Naval Vessel Register on 8 March 1935, and on 23 April was ordered scrapped in accordance with the terms of the London Naval Treaty.
