= USS Balch (DD-50) =

Aylwin-class destroyer

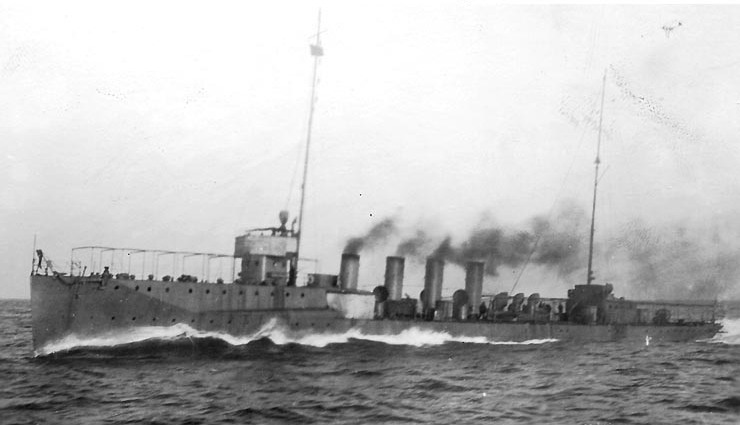
- USS Balch (DD-50) during trials, 22 February 1914.

History

United States
- Name: Balch
- Namesake: Rear admiral George Beale Balch
- Ordered: March 1911
- Builder: William Cramp & Sons, Philadelphia
- Cost: $780,036.55 (hull and machinery)
- Yard number: 386
- Laid down: 7 May 1912
- Launched: 21 December 1912
- Sponsored by: Miss Grace Balch
- Commissioned: 26 March 1914
- Decommissioned: 20 June 1922
- Stricken: 8 March 1935
- Identification: Hull symbol:DD-50; Code letters:NII
- Fate: scrapped at Philadelphia Navy Yard after 23 April 1935

General characteristics
- Class & type: Aylwin-class destroyer
- Displacement: 1,036 long tons (1,053 t)
- Length: 305 ft 3 in (93.04 m)
- Beam: 31 ft 2 in (9.50 m)
- Draft: 9 ft 5 in (2.87 m) (mean)
- Installed power: 4 × boilers; 16,000 shp (12,000 kW)
- Propulsion: 2 × direct-drive steam turbines; 2 × screw propellers
- Speed: 29.5 kn (33.9 mph; 54.6 km/h); 29.62 kn (34.09 mph; 54.86 km/h) (Speed on Trial)
- Complement: 5 officers 96 enlisted
- Armament: 4 × 4 in (100 mm)/50 caliber guns; 8 × 18 inch (450 mm) torpedo tubes (4 × 2); 2 × 0.30 in (7.62 mm) machine guns

USS Balch (Destroyer No. 50/DD-50) was an Aylwin-class destroyer built for the United States Navy prior to the American entry into World War I. The ship was the first U.S. Navy vessel named in honor of George Beale Balch, a US Navy officer who served in the Mexican–American War and the American Civil War, and as Superintendent of the United States Naval Academy.

Balch was laid down by William Cramp & Sons of Philadelphia in May 1912 and launched in December. The ship was a little more than 305 ft (93 m) in length, just over 31 ft (9.4 m) abeam, and had a standard displacement of 1,036 long tons (1,053 t). She was armed with four 4 in (100 mm) guns and had eight 18 inch (450 mm) torpedo tubes. Balch was powered by a pair of steam turbines that propelled her at up to 29.5 kn (33.9 mph; 54.6 km/h).

After her March 1914 commissioning, she participated in a Presidential Fleet Review at New York City in May. After a period in reserve, Balch served on Neutrality Patrol duty. As a part of that duty in October 1916, she was one of several US destroyers sent to rescue survivors from five victims of German submarine U-53 off the Lightship Nantucket. She picked up passengers and crew from a British ocean liner before the U-boat sank it. After the United States entered World War I in April 1917, Balch was sent overseas to patrol the Irish Sea out of Queenstown, Ireland. Balch made several unsuccessful attacks on U-boats. In October 1918, US destroyer Paulding collided with Balch, sending her into Queenstown for two weeks of repairs.

Upon returning to the United States after the war in January 1919, Balch was placed in reduced commission. After alternating periods of activity and time in reserve, Balch was decommissioned at Philadelphia in June 1922. In November 1933 she dropped her name, becoming known only as DD-50. She was struck from the Naval Vessel Register in March 1935 and ordered scrapped in April.

== Design and construction ==
Balch was authorized in March 1911 as the last of four ships of the Aylwin class, which was almost identical to the Cassin-class destroyers authorized at the same time. (Note: The Aylwin class is considered a part of the Cassin class by Conway's All the World's Fighting Ships 1906–1921 (p. 122), but is classed separately by the United States Navy. See, for example, Naval History & Heritage Command. "Aylwin". Dictionary of American Naval Fighting Ships. Navy Department, Naval History and Heritage Command.) Construction of the vessel—like her three sister ships—was awarded to William Cramp & Sons of Philadelphia which laid down her keel on 7 May 1912. On 21 December, Balch was launched by sponsor Miss Grace Balch, daughter of the ship's namesake, George Beale Balch. The ship was the first U.S. Navy ship named for Balch, a US Navy officer who served in the Mexican–American War and the American Civil War and, as a rear admiral, served as Superintendent of United States Naval Academy from 1879 to 1881.

As built, the destroyer was 305 ft 3 in (93.04 m) in length, 31 feet 2 inches (9.50 m) abeam, and drew 10 ft 6 in (3.20 m). The ship had a standard displacement of 1,036 long tons (1,053 t) and displaced 1,235 long tons (1,255 t) when fully loaded.

Balch had two steam turbines that drove her two screw propellers, and an additional pair triple-expansion steam engines, each connected to one of the propeller shafts, for cruising purposes. Four oil-burning boilers powered the engines, which could generate 16,000 shp (12,000 kW), moving the ship at up to 29.5 knots (54.6 km/h).

Balch's main battery consisted of four 4 in (100 mm)/50 caliber Mark 9 guns, (Note: The 50 denotes the length of the gun barrels; in this case, the gun is 50 calibers, meaning that the gun is 50 times as long as its bore, or 200 inches (5.1 m) in this case. The Mark number is the version of the gun; in this case, the ninth US Navy design of the 4-inch/50 gun.) with each gun weighing in excess of 6,100 lb (2,800 kg). The guns fired 33 lb (15 kg) armor-piercing projectiles at 2,900 ft/s (880 m/s). At an elevation of 20°, the guns had a range of 15,920 yd (14,560 m). Balch was also equipped with four twin 18-inch (457 mm) torpedo tubes.

== Pre-World War I ==
Balch was commissioned into the United States Navy on 26 March 1914. Balch served briefly with the Torpedo Flotilla, Atlantic Fleet, carrying out torpedo firing practice off the Virginia Capes before participating in a Presidential Fleet Review for President Woodrow Wilson at New York City on 7 May. Following fleet maneuvers with the Submarine Flotilla out of New London, Connecticut, the Torpedo Flotilla joined the battleship squadrons in Narragansett Bay for maneuvers organized by the Naval War College. Returning to the New York Navy Yard that summer, Balch was placed in reserve commission on 24 July 1914.

The destroyer was placed in full commission again on 17 December 1914 and rejoined the Atlantic Fleet. In June 1915, one of Balch's 21 ft (6.4 m), 1,350 lb (610 kg) torpedoes was unloaded at the Brooklyn Navy Yard, loaded on a horse-drawn truck, and hauled across the Brooklyn Bridge to the Astor Hotel in Manhattan. There, the weapon was on display – along with a shell from a 14 in (360 mm) naval gun—for two days at the "Peace and Preparation" conference of the National Security League. A year later, Balch served as the US Navy's observation platform during the inter-club cruise after the Seawanhaka-Corinthian Yacht Club's annual June regatta. Balch was sent to examine which of the powerboats entered into the cruise—reported by The New York Times as about half of the 200 entries—might be suitable for use as naval auxiliaries.

Prior to the entrance of the United States into World War I, she served on Neutrality Patrol duty, trying to protect American and neutral-flagged merchant ships from interference by British or German warships and U-boats. In the course of performing those duties, Balch was at Newport, Rhode Island, in early October 1916. At 0530 on 8 October, wireless reports came in of a German submarine stopping ships near the Lightship Nantucket, off the eastern end of Long Island. After an SOS from the British steamer West Point was received at about 1230, Rear Admiral Albert Gleaves ordered Balch and other destroyers at Newport to attend to survivors. (Note: According to a report in The New York Times on 9 October the other ships, in addition to Balch, were the flotilla's destroyer tender, Melville, and fifteen other destroyers: Aylwin, Benham, Cassin, Conyngham, Cummings, Cushing, Drayton, Ericsson, Fanning, Jarvis, McCall, O'Brien, Paulding, Porter, and Winslow. A firsthand account of the events by a quartermaster from destroyer McDougal, published on 22 October 1916, indicates that ship was present as well. For the initial report, see: "Newport aroused by U-boat's raid" (PDF). The New York Times. 9 October 1916. p. 2. For the account of McDougal's quartermaster, see: "United States sailor describes rescue of U-53's victims" (PDF). The New York Times. 22 October 1916. p. X1.) The American destroyers arrived on the scene about 1700 when the U-boat, U-53 under the command of Kapitänleutnant Hans Rose, (Note: U-53 had called at Newport on 7 October 1916, the day before the attacks, to drop off a letter for Johann Heinrich von Bernstorff, the German Ambassador to the United States, and had exchanged courtesy visits with Admirals Albert Gleaves and Austin M. Knight before departing.) was in the process of stopping the Holland-America Line cargo ship Blommersdijk. Shortly after, U-53 stopped the British passenger ship Stephano. As Rose had done with three other ships U-53 had sunk earlier in the day, (Note: The other three ships were the British cargo ships West Point and Strathdene, and the Norwegian tanker Christian Knutsen.) he gave passengers and crew aboard Blommersdijk and Stephano adequate time to abandon the ships before sinking the pair. At one point, Rose signaled Balch requesting that she move out of the way to allow Stephano to be torpedoed, much to the later chagrin of Lord Beresford, who denounced Balch's compliance as "aiding and abetting" the Germans in a speech in the House of Lords. In total, 226 survivors from U-53's five victims were rescued by the destroyer flotilla. Balch picked up the crew of Stephano and a number of passengers, later transferring them to destroyer Jenkins for return to Newport.

== World War I ==
When the United States entered World War I on 6 April 1917, Balch fitted out—installing depth charge racks and other wartime gear—in preparation for foreign service. Sailing for European waters on 25 October, Balch arrived at Queenstown, Ireland on 17 November and reported for duty with the Queenstown Force Commander. The destroyer began convoy escort duties on 24 November, which generally meant shepherding merchant ships through the "submarine danger zone" in the western approaches to the United Kingdom and France.

While this duty was relatively uneventful, Balch did twice encounter German submarines. On 29 January 1918, while steaming off Liverpool, she dropped two depth charges over a diving U-boat, without effect. Then, on 12 May, the destroyer joined other escorts in depth-charging a U-boat spotted near convoy HS 60, with Balch dropping 12 depth charges that helped drive off the submarine.

There were other perils at sea, however, most notably on 20 October 1918 when Paulding collided with Balch during convoy escort operations. The collision knocked Balch's port depth charge overboard, but Boatswain's Mate Second Class Albert Cerveny, Coxswain Frank Sekowski, and Gunner's Mate Second Class Frank H. Sumner—all of whom received letters of commendation from the US Navy—recognized that a collision was imminent and set the depth charges to "safe". Balch did suffer steering gear damage which required two weeks of repair at Queenstown. Then, on 5 November, while escorting a convoy in the English Channel, the Balch helped American destroyer Sterett rescue 29 survivors of the foundering merchant ship Dipton, returning the survivors to Queenstown.

== Inter-war period ==
Following the signing of the Armistice on 11 November which ended all fighting, Balch received orders to sail for home and she departed Ireland on 16 November. She arrived at Norfolk, Virginia, via Ponta Delgada, Azores, on 1 January 1919 and was placed in ordinary. Returned to commission in early April, the destroyer sailed to the West Indies for three weeks of maneuvers out of Guantánamo Bay, Cuba. Balch then returned to Norfolk on 28 April for an overhaul. In July 1920, she was assigned the hull code of DD-50 under the US Navy's alphanumeric classification system. Postwar funding shortages kept the destroyer in port until late 1921, when Balch briefly cruised with the Torpedo Flotilla, Atlantic Fleet, before financial considerations led to her inactivation.

Balch was decommissioned at Philadelphia on 20 June 1922. On 1 November 1933, she dropped the name Balch to free it for a new destroyer of the same name, becoming known only as DD-50. The ship was struck from the Naval Vessel Register on 8 March 1935, and, on 23 April, was ordered scrapped at the Philadelphia Navy Yard.
