= USS Ericsson (DD-56) =

O'Brien-class destroyer

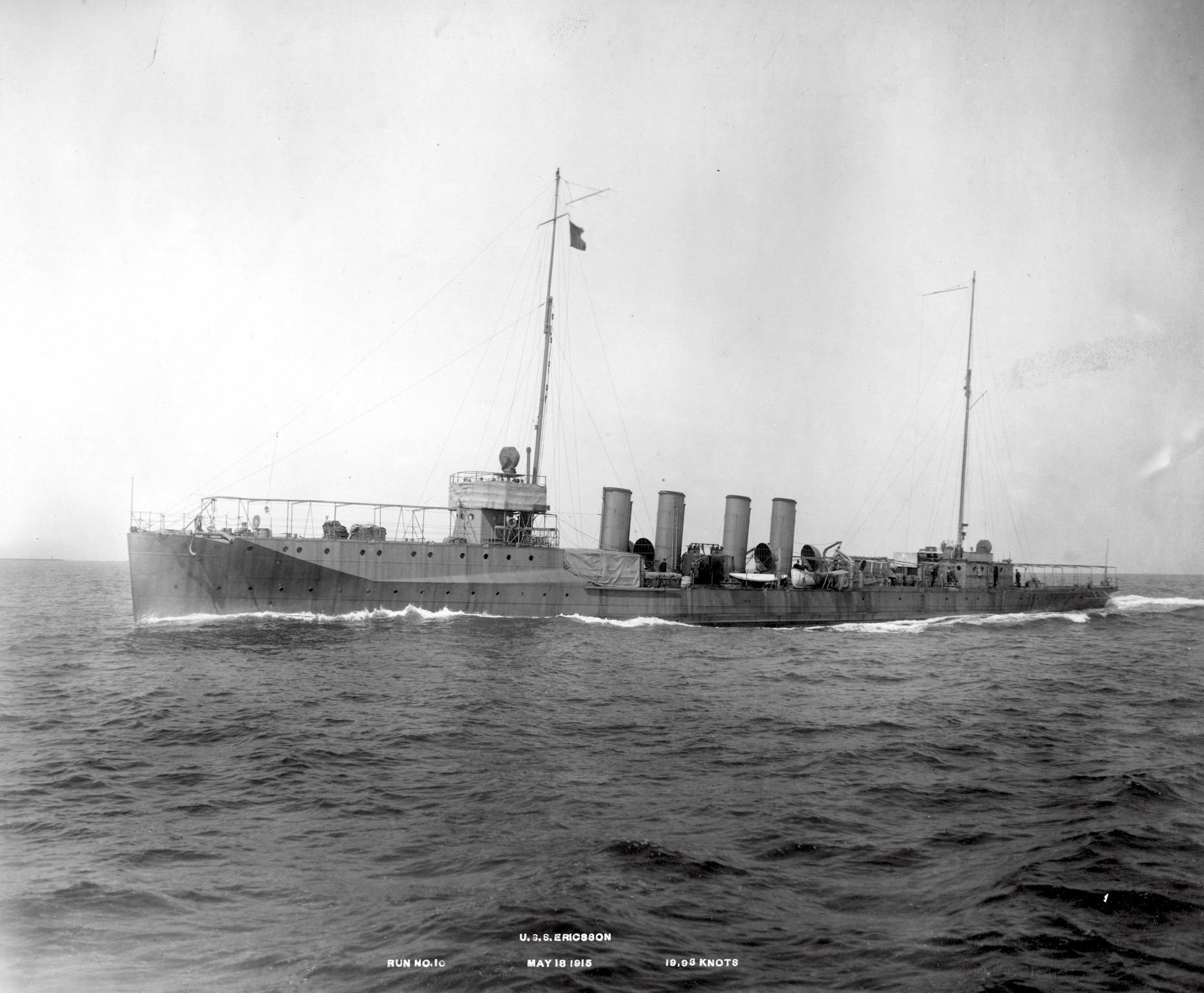
- USS Ericsson (DD-56), Steaming at 19.93 knots during Run No. 10 of builder's trials, 18 May 1915. Her armament has not yet been installed.

History

United States
- Name: Ericsson
- Namesake: John Ericsson
- Ordered: March 1913
- Builder: New York Shipbuilding Corporation; Camden, New Jersey
- Cost: $866,166.00 (hull and machinery)
- Yard number: 141
- Laid down: 10 November 1913
- Launched: 22 August 1914
- Sponsored by: Mrs. J. Washington Logue
- Commissioned: 14 August 1915
- Decommissioned: 16 June 1922
- Stricken: 5 July 1934
- Identification: Hull symbol:DD-56; Code letters:NIS
- Fate: Transferred to U.S. Coast Guard, 7 June 1924; Sold on 22 August 1934 and scrapped

United States
- Name: Ericsson
- Acquired: 7 June 1924
- Commissioned: 28 May 1925
- Decommissioned: 30 April 1932
- Identification: Hull symbol:CG-5
- Fate: Returned to the Navy on 27 April 1934

General characteristics
- Class & type: O'Brien-class destroyer
- Displacement: 1,020 long tons (1,040 t); 1,171 long tons (1,190 t) when fully loaded.
- Length: 305 ft 3 in (93.04 m)
- Beam: 31 ft 1 in (9.47 m)
- Draft: 9 ft 3 in (2.82 m) (mean); 10 ft 7 in (3.23 m) max
- Installed power: 4 × White-Forster boilers; 17,000 shp (13,000 kW)
- Propulsion: 2 × Zoelly direct-drive steam turbines; 2 × screw propellers
- Speed: 29 kn (33 mph; 54 km/h); 30 kn (35 mph; 56 km/h) (Speed on Trial)
- Complement: 5 officers 87 enlisted
- Armament: 4 × 4 in (100 mm)/50 caliber guns; 8 × 21 inch (533 mm) torpedo tubes (4 × 2)

USS Ericsson (Destroyer No. 56/DD-56) was an O'Brien-class destroyer built for the United States Navy prior to the American entry into World War I. The ship was the second U.S. Navy vessel named in honor of John Ericsson, the Swedish-born builder of the ironclad warship USS Monitor during the American Civil War.

Ericsson was laid down by the New York Shipbuilding of Camden, New Jersey, in November 1913 and launched in August of the following year. The ship was a little more than 305 feet (93 m) in length, just over 31 feet (9.4 m) abeam, and had a standard displacement of 1,090 long tons (1,110 t). She was armed with four 4-inch (102 mm) guns and had eight 21 inch (533 mm) torpedo tubes. Ericsson was powered by a pair of steam turbines that propelled her at up to 29 knots (54 km/h).

After her May 1916 commissioning, Ericsson sailed off the east coast and in the Caribbean. She was one of seventeen destroyers sent out to rescue survivors from five victims of German submarine U-53 off the Lightship Nantucket in October 1916, and carried 81 passengers from a sunken British ocean liner to Newport, Rhode Island. After the United States entered World War I in April 1917, Ericsson was part of the first U.S. destroyer squadron sent overseas. Patrolling the Irish Sea out of Queenstown, Ireland, Ericsson made several unsuccessful attacks on U-boats, and rescued survivors of several ships sunk by the German craft.

Upon returning to the United States after the war, Ericsson conducted operations with the destroyers of the Atlantic Fleet until August 1919, when she was placed in reserve, still in commission. After a brief stint of operations in mid 1921, she was placed in reserve until she was decommissioned at Philadelphia in June 1922. In June 1924, Ericsson was transferred to the United States Coast Guard to help enforce Prohibition as a part of the "Rum Patrol". She operated under the name USCGC Ericsson (CG-5) until May 1932, when she was returned to the Navy. She was sold for scrap in August 1934.

== Design and construction ==
Ericsson was authorized in March 1913 as the sixth and final ship of the O'Brien class which was an improved version of the Cassin-class destroyers authorized in 1911. Construction of the vessel was awarded to New York Shipbuilding of Camden, New Jersey, which laid down her keel on 10 November 1913. Just over nine months later, on 22 August 1914, Ericsson was launched by sponsor Mrs. J. Washington Logue, wife of the Pennsylvania Congressman. The ship was named in honor of John Ericsson, the builder of the ironclad warship USS Monitor during the American Civil War, and was the second U.S. Navy ship named for the Swedish native. As built, the destroyer was 305 feet 3 inches (93.04 m) in length, 31 feet 1 inch (9.47 m) abeam, and drew 9 feet 6 inches (2.90 m). The ship had a standard displacement of 1,090 long tons (1,110 t) and displaced 1,171 long tons (1,190 t) when fully loaded.

Ericsson had two Zoelly steam turbines that drove her two screw propellers, and an additional triple-expansion steam engine connected to one of the propeller shafts for cruising purposes. Four oil-burning White-Forster boilers powered the engines, which could generate 17,000 shaft horsepower (13,000 kW), moving the ship at up to 29 knots (54 km/h).

Ericsson's main battery consisted of four 4-inch (102 mm)/50 Mark 9 guns, (Note: The 50 denotes the length of the gun barrels; in this case, the gun is 50 calibers, meaning that the gun is 50 times as long as its bore, or 200 inches (5.1 m) in this case. The Mark number is the version of the gun; in this case, the ninth U.S. Navy design of the 4-inch/50 gun.) with each gun weighing in excess of 6,100 pounds (2,800 kg). The guns fired 33-pound (15 kg) armor-piercing projectiles at 2,900 feet per second (880 m/s). At an elevation of 20°, the guns had a range of 15,920 yards (14,560 m).

Ericsson was also equipped with eight 21-inch (533 mm) torpedo tubes. The General Board of the United States Navy had called for two anti-aircraft guns for the O'Brien-class ships, as well as provisions for laying up to 36 floating mines. From sources, it is unclear if these recommendations were followed for Ericsson or any of the other ships of the class.

== Early career ==
USS Ericsson was commissioned into the United States Navy on 14 August 1915. From October through December 1915, Ericsson operated out of New York and Newport, Rhode Island, on drills, in training, and on the Neutrality Patrol. With the Torpedo Flotilla of the Atlantic Fleet she sailed on 7 January 1916 for maneuvers in the Caribbean, using Key West and Guantanamo Bay as bases. She returned to Newport on 23 May.

At 05:30 on Sunday, 8 October 1916, wireless reports came in of a German submarine stopping ships near the Lightship Nantucket, off the eastern end of Long Island. After an SOS from the British steamer West Point was received at about 12:30, Rear Admiral Albert Gleaves ordered Ericsson and other destroyers at Newport to attend to survivors; Ericsson was the fourth of seventeen destroyers to get underway. (Note: According to a report in The New York Times on 9 October the other ships, in addition to Ericsson, were the flotilla's destroyer tender, Melville, and fifteen other destroyers: Aylwin, Balch, Benham, Cassin, Conyngham, Cummings, Cushing, Drayton, Fanning, Jarvis, McCall, O'Brien, Paulding, Porter, Winslow. A firsthand account of the events by the quartermaster of destroyer McDougal, published on 22 October 1916, indicates that ship was present as well. For the initial report, see: "Newport aroused by U-boat's raid" (PDF). The New York Times. 9 October 1916. p. 2. For the account of McDougal's quartermaster, see: "United States sailor describes rescue of U-53's victims" (PDF). The New York Times. 22 October 1916. p. X1.) The destroyers arrived on the scene at about 17:00 when the U-boat, U-53 under the command of Kapitänleutnant Hans Rose, (Note: U-53 had called at Newport on 7 October 1916, the day before the attacks, to drop off a letter for Johann Heinrich von Bernstorff, the German Ambassador to the United States, and had exchanged courtesy visits with Admirals Albert Gleaves and Austin M. Knight before departing.) fired shots across the bow of the Holland-America Line cargo ship Blommersdijk, signaling her to stop. Shortly after, U-53 stopped the British passenger ship Stephano. As Rose had done with three other ships U-53 had sunk earlier in the day, (Note: The other three ships were the British cargo ships West Point and Strathdene and the Norwegian tanker Christian Knutsen.) he gave passengers and crew aboard Blommersdijk and Stephano adequate time to abandon the ships. Ericsson was one of six destroyers taking on passengers from Stephano that witnessed her sinking. (Note: Benham and McDougal were two of the other five specifically identified in contemporary news accounts, both being ordered by Rose to move away so that he could finish sinking the ship. See: "Newport opens arms to U-boat survivors" (PDF). The New York Times. 10 October 1916. p. 2.) In total, 226 survivors from U-53's five victims were rescued by the destroyer flotilla. Ericsson transported 81—including 35 women and children—back to Newport, where she arrived at 01:30 on 9 October.

After finishing out the rest of 1916 at Newport, Ericsson again joined in exercises in the Caribbean for the first three months of 1917, and then returned to New York City and Newport to prepare for distant service.

== World War I ==
After the United States declared war on Germany on 6 April 1917 entering World War I, Ericsson was prepared for overseas duty. On 7 May, Ericsson sailed from Boston with Tucker, Rowan, Cassin, Winslow and Jacob Jones for Queenstown, Ireland, where they arrived on 17 May. Ericsson began patrol duty in the war zone, and almost at once came upon a surfaced U-boat shelling two sailing ships. She opened fire, forcing the submarine down and preventing further attack, then picked up 37 survivors of the sailing ships. She continued on patrol and escort duty, and on 28 September, at night, sighted a surfaced submarine, at which she fired. Ericsson dropped depth charges, but before she could carry out her plan to ram the German U-boat, she lost contact in the darkness.

Ericsson continued to sail out of Queenstown on patrol and escorting convoys, many times attacking submarines, standing by damaged ships, and rescuing survivors. After June 1918, she was based at Brest, France; and during that summer, usually sailed about 3 nautical miles (5.6 km) ahead of convoys, towing aloft a kite balloon used for observation. At the close of the war, Ericsson was overhauled at Liverpool, but returned to Brest in time to take part on 13 December in the welcoming honors rendered for President Woodrow Wilson, arriving in France on the transport George Washington. On 21 December, Ericsson departed for the United States, arriving at New York on 8 January 1919.

== Postwar ==
In May 1919, Ericsson sailed to the Azores to observe and support the historic first aerial crossing of the Atlantic, made by Navy seaplanes. After exercises along the east coast and in the Caribbean, she entered New York Navy Yard for repairs, and there was placed in reserve, still in commission, on 7 August. She was laid up in reduced commission at Philadelphia and Charleston, South Carolina, in the years that followed, and put to sea only during the summer of 1921, when drills and exercises took her to Newport. She was decommissioned at Philadelphia on 16 June 1922.

== United States Coast Guard career ==
On 17 January 1920, Prohibition was instituted by law in the United States. Soon, the smuggling of alcoholic beverages along the coastlines of the United States became widespread and blatant. The Treasury Department eventually determined that the United States Coast Guard simply did not have the ships to constitute a successful patrol. To cope with the problem, President Calvin Coolidge in 1924 authorized the transfer from the Navy to the Coast Guard of twenty old destroyers that were in reserve and out of commission. Ericsson was activated and acquired by the Coast Guard on 7 June 1924.

Designated CG-5, Ericsson was commissioned on 28 May 1925, and joined the "Rum Patrol" to aid in the attempt to enforce prohibition laws. On 11 April 1926, she captured the rum-runner Atalanta. During her time in the Coast Guard, Ericsson's gunners were awarded the USCG Gunnery Trophy for Destroyers for 1925–26 and 1926–27. Ericsson was decommissioned at the Philadelphia Navy Yard on 30 April 1930, and returned to the U.S. Navy on 23 May 1932. She was scrapped and her salvaged material sold on 22 August 1934 in accordance with the London Naval Treaty.

== Bibliography ==
- Bauer, K. Jack; Roberts, Stephen S. (1991). Register of Ships of the U.S. Navy, 1775–1990: Major Combatants. New York: Greenwood Press. ISBN 978-0-313-26202-9. OCLC 24010356.
- Gardiner, Robert; Gray, Randal, eds. (1985). Conway's All the World's Fighting Ships 1906–1921. Annapolis, Maryland: Naval Institute Press. ISBN 978-0-87021-907-8. OCLC 12119866.
- Long, Wellington (October 1966). "The Cruise of the U-53". Proceedings. 92 (10). Annapolis, Maryland: United States Naval Institute: 89–94. ISSN 0041-798X. OCLC 2496995.
- Naval History & Heritage Command. "Ericsson". Dictionary of American Naval Fighting Ships. Navy Department, Naval History and Heritage Command.
- Naval History & Heritage Command. "Tucker". Dictionary of American Naval Fighting Ships. Navy Department, Naval History & Heritage Command.
