= USS Winslow (DD-53) =

O'Brien-class destroyer

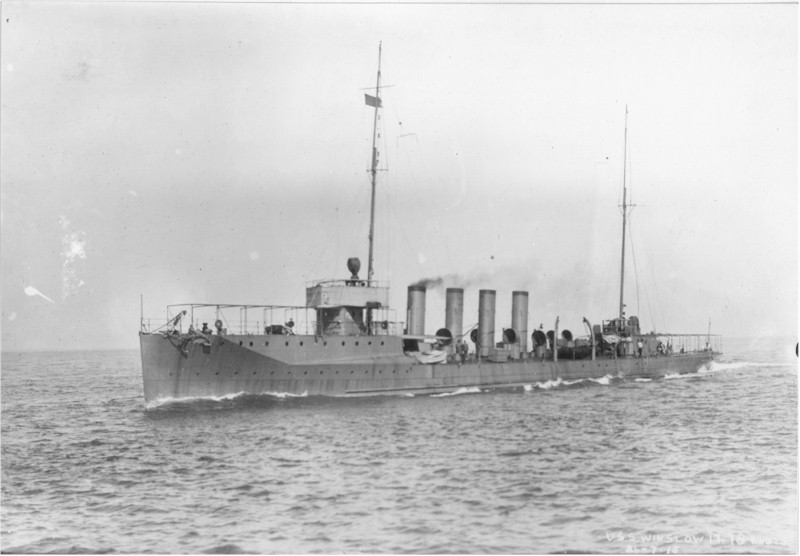
- USS Winslow (DD-53) during trials in 1915.

History

United States
- Name: Winslow
- Namesake: Rear admiral John Ancrum Winslow
- Ordered: March 1913
- Builder: William Cramp & Sons; Philadelphia
- Cost: $856,100.67 (hull and machinery)
- Yard number: 406
- Laid down: 1 October 1913
- Launched: 11 February 1915
- Sponsored by: Miss Natalie E. Winslow
- Commissioned: 7 August 1915
- Decommissioned: 5 June 1922
- Renamed: DD-53, 1 July 1933
- Stricken: 7 January 1936
- Identification: Hull symbol:DD-53; Code letters:NJA
- Fate: Sold on 30 June 1936 and scrapped

General characteristics
- Class & type: O'Brien-class destroyer
- Displacement: 1,050 long tons (1,070 t); 1,171 long tons (1,190 t) fully loaded
- Length: 305 ft 3 in (93.04 m)
- Beam: 31 ft 1 in (9.47 m)
- Draft: 9 ft 6 in (2.90 m) (mean); 10 ft 7 in (3.23 m) max
- Installed power: 4 × White-Forster boilers; 17,000 shp (13,000 kW)
- Propulsion: 2 × Zoelly direct-drive steam turbines; 2 × screw propellers
- Speed: 29 kn (33 mph; 54 km/h); 29.05 kn (33.43 mph; 53.80 km/h) (Speed on Trial)
- Complement: 5 officers 96 enlisted
- Armament: 4 × 4 in (100 mm)/50 caliber guns; 8 × 21 inch (533 mm) torpedo tubes (4 × 2)

USS Winslow (Destroyer No. 53/DD-53) was an O'Brien-class destroyer built for the United States Navy prior to the American entry into World War I. The ship was the second US Navy vessel named in honor of John Ancrum Winslow, a US Navy officer notable for sinking the Confederate commerce raider CSS Alabama during the American Civil War.

Winslow was laid down by William Cramp & Sons of Philadelphia in October 1913 and launched in February 1915. The ship was a little more than 305 ft (93 m) in length, just over 31 ft (9.4 m) abeam, and had a standard displacement of 1,050 long tons (1,070 t). She was armed with four 4 in (100 mm) guns and had eight 21 inch (533 mm) torpedo tubes. Winslow was powered by a pair of steam turbines that propelled her at up to 29 kn (33 mph; 54 km/h).

After her August 1915 commissioning, Winslow sailed off the east coast and in the Caribbean. She was one of seventeen destroyers sent out to rescue survivors from five victims of German submarine U-53 off the Lightship Nantucket in October 1916. After the United States entered World War I in April 1917, Winslow was sent overseas to patrol the Irish Sea out of Queenstown, Ireland. Winslow made several unsuccessful attacks on U-boats, and rescued survivors of several ships sunk by the German craft.

Upon returning to the United States after the war, Winslow was placed in reduced commission in December 1919. She was decommissioned at Philadelphia in June 1922. In November she dropped her name to free it for a new destroyer of the same name, becoming known only as DD-53. She was struck from the Naval Vessel Register in January 1936 and sold for scrapping in June.

== Design and construction ==
Winslow was authorized in March 1913 as the third of six ships of the O'Brien class, which was an improved version of the Cassin-class destroyers authorized in 1911. Construction of the vessel was awarded to William Cramp & Sons of Philadelphia which laid down her keel on 1 October 1913. On 11 February 1915, Winslow was launched by sponsor Miss Natalie E. Winslow, grandniece of the ship's namesake, John Ancrum Winslow. The ship was the second ship named for Winslow, a US Navy officer notable for sinking the Confederate commerce raider CSS Alabama during the American Civil War. As built, the destroyer was 305 ft 3 in (93.04 m) in length, 31 ft 1 in (9.47 m) abeam, and drew 10 ft 4.5 in (3.162 m). The ship had a standard displacement of 1,050 long tons (1,070 t) and displaced 1,171 long tons (1,190 t) when fully loaded.

Winslow had two Zoelly steam turbines that drove her two screw propellers, and an additional pair triple-expansion steam engines, each connected to one of the propeller shafts, for cruising purposes. Four oil-burning White-Forster boilers powered the engines, which could generate 17,000 shp (13,000 kW), moving the ship at up to 29 knots (33 mph; 54 km/h).

Winslow's main battery consisted of four 4 in (100 mm)/50 caliber Mark 9 guns, (Note: The 50 denotes the length of the gun barrels; in this case, the gun is 50 calibers, meaning that the gun is 50 times as long as its bore, or 200 inches (5.1 m) in this case. The Mark number is the version of the gun; in this case, the ninth US Navy design of the 4-inch/50 gun.) with each gun weighing in excess of 6,100 lb (2,800 kg). The guns fired 33 lb (15 kg) armor-piercing projectiles at 2,900 ft/s (880 m/s). At an elevation of 20°, the guns had a range of 15,920 yd (14,560 m).

Winslow was also equipped with eight 21 in (530 mm) torpedo tubes. The General Board of the United States Navy had called for two anti-aircraft guns for the O'Brien-class ships, as well as provisions for laying up to 36 floating mines. From sources, it is unclear if these recommendations were followed for Winslow or any of the other ships of the class.

Winslow carried out Sea trials from 29 June to 1 July 1915, reaching a maximum speed of 29.90 kn (34.41 mph; 55.37 km/h) over the measured mile and an average speed of 29.054 kn (33.435 mph; 53.808 km/h) over a 4 hour full-power trial.

== Pre-World War I ==
Winslow was commissioned into the United States Navy on 7 August 1915. After trials off the upper east coast, Winslow joined the 6th Division, Atlantic Fleet Torpedo Flotilla. The destroyer participated in maneuvers in Cuban waters during the winter of 1915 and 1916 and, in the spring, began operations along the eastern seaboard. By October 1916, she was serving in coastal waters near Newport, Rhode Island.

At 0530 on 8 October 1916, wireless reports came in of a German submarine stopping ships near the Lightship Nantucket, off the eastern end of Long Island. After an SOS from the British steamer West Point was received at about 1230, Rear Admiral Albert Gleaves ordered Winslow and other destroyers at Newport to attend to survivors. (Note: According to a report in The New York Times on 9 October the other ships, in addition to Winslow, were the flotilla's destroyer tender, Melville, and fifteen other destroyers: Aylwin, Balch, Benham, Cassin, Conyngham, Cummings, Cushing, Drayton, Ericsson, Fanning, Jarvis, McCall, O'Brien, Paulding, and Porter. A firsthand account of the events by a quartermaster from destroyer McDougal, published on 22 October, indicates that ship was present as well. For the initial report, see: "Newport aroused by U-boat's raid" (PDF). The New York Times. 9 October 1916. p. 2. For the account of McDougal's quartermaster, see: "United States sailor describes rescue of U-53's victims" (PDF). The New York Times. 22 October 1916. p. X1.) The American destroyers arrived on the scene about 1700 when the U-boat, U-53 under the command of Kapitänleutnant Hans Rose, (Note: U-53 had called at Newport on 7 October, the day before the attacks, to drop off a letter for Johann Heinrich von Bernstorff, the German Ambassador to the United States, and had exchanged courtesy visits with Admirals Albert Gleaves and Austin M. Knight before departing.) was in the process of stopping the Holland-America Line cargo ship Blommersdijk. Shortly after, U-53 stopped the British passenger ship Stephano. As Rose had done with three other ships U-53 had sunk earlier in the day, (Note: The other three ships were the British cargo ships West Point and Strathdene, and the Norwegian tanker Christian Knutsen.) he gave passengers and crew aboard Blommersdijk and Stephano adequate time to abandon the ships before sinking the pair. In total, 226 survivors from U-53's five victims were rescued by the destroyer flotilla.

At the end of October, the warship went into the New York Navy Yard and remained there through the end of the year. In January 1917, she steamed south to Cuba, where she joined the rest of the Fleet to participate in annual winter maneuvers. Following the Fleet exercise, Winslow returned north to the Chesapeake.

== World War I ==
When the United States declared war on Germany on 6 April 1917 entering World War I, the destroyer was anchored in the York River near Yorktown, Virginia. She had been there guarding the river mouth since February when American relations with Germany began to deteriorate as a result of the latter country's return to unrestricted submarine warfare. Soon after US Congress declared war, Winslow moved north to the New York Navy Yard to prepare for duty overseas. Less than a month later, she moved to Boston from where she got underway for Europe on 7 May with Cassin, Ericsson, Jacob Jones, Rowan, and Tucker. After a 10-day passage, Winslow reported for duty at Queenstown, Ireland, on the 17th. On the 21st, she began patrolling the approaches to the British Isles.

Winslow operated out of Queenstown for almost a year escorting convoys into and out of Queenstown and going to the assistance of ships attacked by U-boats. Just after midnight on 11 June, she spied her first submarine and rushed to the attack. Her target submerged, and the destroyer dropped a series of depth charges. She failed, however, to find any evidence supporting the success of her attack and resumed her patrol.

On 30 July, Winslow picked up the master and 12 crewmen from SS Whitehall, torpedoed the day before by U-95, and brought them safely into Queenstown. She sighted another U-boat off Queenstown on 16 August, but heavy weather covered the submarine's tracks when it submerged and Winslow made no attack.

Six weeks later, on 24 September, the warship rushed to the assistance of Henry Lippitt, an unarmed American schooner being shelled by U-60. When the destroyer reached the 895 GRT sailing vessel, she was in flames, and the U-boat had just submerged. Winslow dropped a depth charge barrage on what appeared to be the submarine's moving wake, but broke off the attack to assist the schooner's crew; all were saved, but Henry Lippitt was sunk.

During the remainder of her assignment at Queenstown, Winslow attacked two more submarines, the first on 11 October and the second on 3 January 1918. In both cases, she depth-charged oil slicks which appeared to originate from damaged, submerged U-boats. In neither case did she receive visible confirmation of a sinking; however, during the 3 January attack, one of her depth charges threw a large mass of dark liquid high in the air. From this description, it appears that her depth charge brought up fuel oil from what was believed to be U-61. Unfortunately for Winslow, lack of definite proof kept her from being credited with a sinking.

At the beginning of April 1918, the destroyer was reassigned to the United States Naval Forces in France. Operating from Brest, she spent the remainder of the war escorting American troop transports into French ports. Although she engaged German submarines on at least seven different occasions, she did not score any confirmed successes. On 8 August, she came to the aid of Westward Ho, torpedoed in the Bay of Biscay earlier the same day by U-62.

On 5 September, she attacked the German submarine U-82, which had just torpedoed U.S. Navy transport Mount Vernon. Depth charges dropped by Winslow, Conner, Nicholson, and Wainwright failed to sink the U-boat, but, combined with defensive efforts from Mount Vernon herself, helped prevent the submarine from launching a coup de grâce against the former German liner. Mount Vernon safely made it back to Brest with the loss of 37 crewmen out of the 1,450 persons on board.

Winslow continued her patrols out of Brest through the end of hostilities on 11 November.

== Inter-war period ==
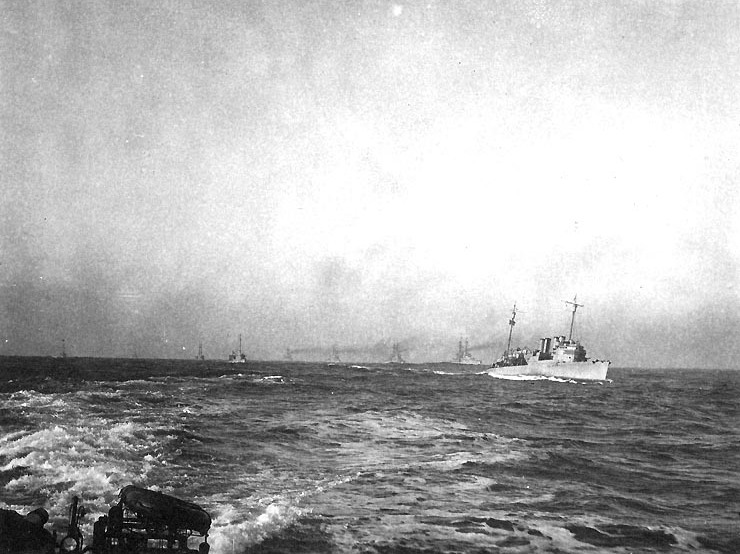
Battleships and destroyers of the United States Atlantic Fleet escorting President Woodrow Wilson on George Washington near Brest, France, on 13 December 1918; Winslow served as part of the escort.

Following the signing of the Armistice on 11 November, which ended all fighting, Winslow remained in French waters. When President Woodrow Wilson arrived at Brest on George Washington on 13 December, the destroyer served as part of that transport's escort into the harbor. 15 days later, the warship departed France to return to the United States, arriving at New York on 12 January 1919.

After her return to the United States, Winslow resumed peacetime duty with the Atlantic Fleet. During May, she served as one of the rescue pickets stationed along the route across the Atlantic flown by three Navy NC-type seaplanes in the first aerial crossing of the Atlantic. After that, the destroyer returned to normal operations along the east coast and annual winter maneuvers in Cuban waters until placed in reduced commission at Philadelphia on 10 December 1919.

In July 1920, she was assigned the hull code of DD-53 under the US Navy's alphanumeric classification system. Winslow was decommissioned at Philadelphia on 5 June 1922. On 1 July 1933, she dropped the name Winslow to free it for a new destroyer of the same name, becoming known only as DD-53. The ship was struck from the Naval Vessel Register on 7 January 1936, and, on 30 June, was sold for scrapping.
