= USS Benham (DD-49) =

Aylwin-class destroyer

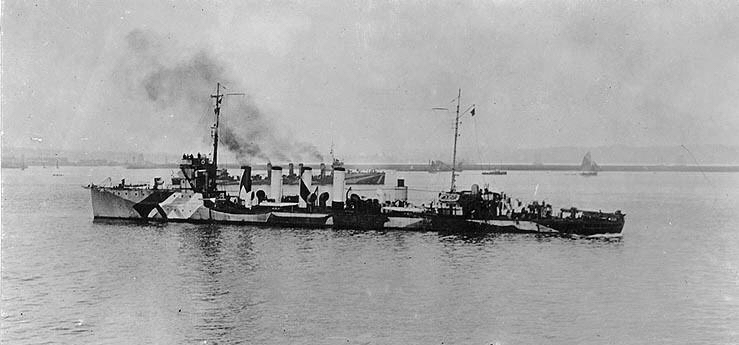
- USS Benham leaving Brest, for escort duty on 22 October 1918.

History

United States
- Name: Benham
- Namesake: Rear admiral Andrew Ellicot Kennedy Benham
- Ordered: March 1911
- Builder: William Cramp & Sons, Philadelphia
- Cost: $763,930.55 (hull and machinery)
- Yard number: 385
- Laid down: 14 March 1912
- Launched: 22 March 1913
- Sponsored by: Edith Wallace Benham
- Commissioned: 20 January 1914
- Decommissioned: 7 July 1922
- Stricken: 8 March 1935
- Identification: Hull symbol:DD-47; Code letters:NIJ
- Fate: Scrapped at Philadelphia Navy Yard after 23 April 1935

General characteristics
- Class & type: Aylwin-class destroyer
- Displacement: 1,036 long tons (1,053 t)
- Length: 305 ft 3 in (93.04 m)
- Beam: 30 ft 4 in (9.25 m)
- Draft: 9 ft 5 in (2.87 m) (mean)
- Installed power: 4 × boilers; 16,000 shp (12,000 kW)
- Propulsion: 2 × direct-drive steam turbines; 2 × screw propellers
- Speed: 29.5 kn (33.9 mph; 54.6 km/h); 29.0 kn (33.4 mph; 53.7 km/h) (Speed on Trial)
- Complement: 5 officers 96 enlisted
- Armament: 4 × 4 in (100 mm)/50 caliber guns; 8 × 18 inch (450 mm) torpedo tubes (4 × 2); 2 × 0.30 in (7.62 mm) machine guns

USS Benham (Destroyer No. 49/DD-49) was an Aylwin-class destroyer built for the United States Navy prior to the American entry into World War I. The ship was the first U.S. Navy vessel named in honor of Rear Admiral Andrew E. K. Benham.

Benham was laid down by William Cramp & Sons of Philadelphia in March 1912 and launched in March 1913. The ship was a little more than 305 ft (93 m) in length, just over 30 ft (9.1 m) abeam, and had a standard displacement of 1,036 long tons (1,053 t). She was armed with four 4 in (100 mm) guns and had eight 18 inch (450 mm) torpedo tubes. Benham was powered by a pair of steam turbines that propelled her at up to 29.5 kn (33.9 mph; 54.6 km/h).

After her January 1914 commissioning, she assisted her sister ship Aylwin when that ship suffered an explosion in one of her fire rooms in April. After a period in reserve, Benham served on Neutrality Patrol duty. As a part of that duty in October 1916, she was one of several U.S. destroyers sent to rescue survivors from five victims of German submarine U-53 off the Lightship Nantucket. She picked up officers and crew from a Dutch cargo ship before the U-boat sank it. After the United States entered World War I in April 1917, Benham was sent overseas to patrol the Irish Sea out of Queenstown, Ireland. Benham made several unsuccessful attacks on U-boats. During her overseas service, Benham was rammed by HMS Zinnia and nearly sunk.

Upon returning to the United States after the war in January 1919, Benham was placed in reduced commission. After alternating periods of activity and time in reserve, Benham was decommissioned at Philadelphia in July 1922. She was struck from the Naval Vessel Register in March 1935 and ordered scrapped in April.

== Design and construction ==
Benham was authorized in March 1911 as the third of four ships of the Aylwin class, which was almost identical to the Cassin-class destroyers authorized at the same time. (Note: The Aylwin class is considered a part of the Cassin class by Conway's All the World's Fighting Ships 1906–1921 (p. 122), but is classed separately by the United States Navy. See, for example, Naval History & Heritage Command. "Aylwin". Dictionary of American Naval Fighting Ships. Navy Department, Naval History and Heritage Command.) Construction of the vessel—like her three sister ships—was awarded to William Cramp & Sons of Philadelphia which laid down her keel on 14 March 1912. On 22 March 1913, Benham was launched by sponsor Edith Wallace Benham, daughter of the ship's namesake, Andrew Ellicot Kennedy Benham. The ship was the first U.S. Navy vessel named in honor of the American admiral. As built, the destroyer was 305 ft 3 in (93.04 m) in length, 30 ft 4 in (9.25 m) abeam, and drew 9 ft 5 in (2.87 m). The ship had a standard displacement of 1,036 long tons (1,053 t) and displaced 1,235 long tons (1,255 t) when fully loaded.

Benham had two steam turbines that drove her two screw propellers, and an additional pair triple-expansion steam engines, each connected to one of the propeller shafts, for cruising purposes. Four oil-burning boilers powered the engines, which could generate 16,000 shp (12,000 kW), moving the ship at the design speed of 29.5 kn (33.9 mph; 54.6 km/h); Benham exceeded her contracted speed in her trials in December 1913, when she averaged 29.81 kn (34.30 mph; 55.21 km/h) over five runs off the Delaware Breakwater.

Benham's main battery consisted of four 4 in (100 mm)/50 caliber Mark 9 guns, (Note: The 50 denotes the length of the gun barrels; in this case, the gun is 50 calibers, meaning that the gun is 50 times as long as its bore, or 200 in (5.1 m) in this case. The Mark number is the version of the gun; in this case, the ninth U.S. Navy design of the 4-inch/50 gun.) with each gun weighing in excess of 6,100 lb (2,800 kg). The guns fired 33 lb (15 kg) armor-piercing projectiles at 2,900 ft/s (880 m/s). At an elevation of 20°, the guns had a range of 15,920 yd (14,560 m). In early 1917, Benham's single 4 in (100 mm) guns were replaced with twin 4 in (100 mm) guns on an experimental basis. However, before Benham departed for overseas service during World War I, her original single gun mounts had been restored. Benham was also equipped with four twin mount 18 in (460 mm) torpedo tubes.

== Pre-World War I ==
USS Benham was commissioned into the U.S. Navy on 20 January 1914. In February and March, Benham conducted a shakedown cruise to the West Indies and, in April, began operations out of Hampton Roads, Virginia. On 6 April, Benham and sister ships Aylwin and Parker were exercising off the North Carolina coast, about 15 nautical miles (28 km) off the Diamond Shoals lightship. An explosion ripped through the forward fire room on Aylwin, injuring three men. Benham loaded the three wounded sailors and sped to the naval hospital at Norfolk, Virginia, while Parker took on the remainder of Aylwin's crew. One of the injured men died on Benham before landfall was made in Virginia; another died a short time later. Aylwin remained afloat but, unmanned, was towed into Norfolk by Parker and U.S. Navy tug Sonoma. The crews of all three destroyers raised $250 to help defray funeral expenses for the widow of one of the men. In July, the Benham went into reserve at the New York Navy Yard. She came back into active service on 21 December 1914.

In August 1916, the U.S. Navy conducted what The New York Times called the "greatest war game undertaken by the American Navy." In the scenario, a 'Blue' force defended the East Coast of the United States against a 'Red' force attempting an amphibious landing. Benham, scouting for the Blue force, was the first to spot the inbound Red transports and their escorts, but an attack on the transports by the Red force was repulsed, leading to a Blue victory.

Prior to the entrance of the United States into World War I, she served on Neutrality Patrol duty, trying to protect American and neutral-flagged merchant ships from interference by British or German warships and U-boats. In the course of performing those duties, Benham was at Newport, Rhode Island, in early October 1916. At 05:30 on 8 October, wireless reports came in of a German submarine stopping ships near the Lightship Nantucket, off the eastern end of Long Island. After an SOS from the British steamship West Point was received at about 12:30, Rear Admiral Albert Gleaves ordered Benham and other destroyers at Newport to attend to survivors. (Note: According to a report in The New York Times on 9 October the other ships, in addition to Benham, were the flotilla's destroyer tender, Melville, and 15 other destroyers: Aylwin, Balch, Cassin, Conyngham, Cummings, Cushing, Drayton, Ericsson, Fanning, Jarvis, McCall, O'Brien, Paulding, Porter, and Winslow. A firsthand account of the events by a quartermaster from destroyer McDougal, published on 22 October 1916, indicates that ship was present as well. For the initial report, see: "Newport aroused by U-boat's raid" (PDF). The New York Times. 9 October 1916. p. 2. For the account of McDougal's quartermaster, see: "United States sailor describes rescue of U-53's victims" (PDF). The New York Times. 22 October 1916. p. X1.) The American destroyers arrived on the scene about 17:00 when the U-boat, U-53 under the command of Kapitänleutnant Hans Rose, (Note: U-53 had called at Newport on 7 October 1916, the day before the attacks, to drop off a letter for Johann Heinrich von Bernstorff, the German Ambassador to the United States, and had exchanged courtesy visits with Admirals Albert Gleaves and Austin M. Knight before departing.) was in the process of stopping the Holland America Line cargo ship Blommersdijk. Shortly after, U-53 stopped the British passenger ship Stephano. As Rose had done with three other ships U-53 had sunk earlier in the day, (Note: The other three ships were the British cargo ships West Point and Strathdene, and the Norwegian tanker Christian Knutsen.) he gave passengers and crew aboard Blommersdijk and Stephano adequate time to abandon the ships before sinking the pair. In total, 226 survivors from U-53's five victims were rescued by the destroyer flotilla. Benham picked up the captain of and crewmen from Blommersdijk for transport to Newport.

== World War I ==
After the United States entered World War I on 6 April 1917, Benham was one of the first group of destroyers chosen for anti-submarine duty in European waters. She departed Tompkinsville, New York on 17 May and arrived in Queenstown, Ireland on 24 May. Four days later, the destroyer began the first of many tours of duty at sea hunting U-boats and shepherding convoys to their destinations.

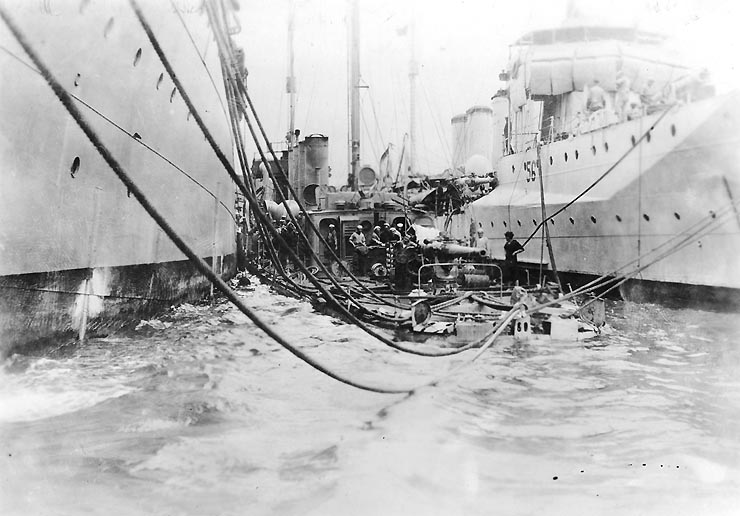
Benham, moored next to Ericsson (right), after her collision with HMS Zinnia

Her first encounter with U-boats came on 13 July when she was apparently attacked by two submarines. They launched a total of three torpedoes at Benham, but she and her convoy evaded them. The destroyer then drove them away with a depth charge attack. On 30 July, while she was on her way to Queenstown, the destroyer spied the wake of another torpedo some 1,500 yd (1,400 m) from her. Immediately, she charged to the attack with guns and depth charges. Later, her crew sighted air bubbles and oil on the surface. The British Admiralty commended her for probable damage to a German U-boat. The destroyer continued her patrols out of Queenstown until June 1918 when she moved to Brest, France, her base of operations through the end of the war.

In September 1917, during her European wartime service, Benham was rammed by the British Azalea-class sloop HMS Zinnia. The event is not mentioned in the Dictionary of American Naval Fighting Ships; the extent of the damage to both ships is unknown. A photograph from the U.S. Navy's Naval History & Heritage Command website shows a nearly sunken Benham moored between two ships.

== Postwar ==
On 21 December 1918, Benham put to sea from Brest for the last time and began the voyage back to the United States. Rejoining the Atlantic Fleet at the beginning of 1919, the warship participated in the annual fleet maneuvers held in Cuban waters and then made a cruise to the Azores in May. Upon her return to the United States that summer, she was placed in ordinary at Norfolk on 28 June. Active again in 1921, she patrolled the eastern seaboard until assigned duty as plane guard and tender to the Atlantic Fleet Air Squadrons. That duty terminated in May 1922, and she stood into Philadelphia on 12 May to prepare for inactivation.

Benham was decommissioned at Philadelphia on 7 July 1922. The ship was struck from the Naval Vessel Register on 8 March 1935, and, on 23 April, was ordered scrapped at the Philadelphia Navy Yard.
