= USS Benham =

USS Benham has been the name of three ships in the United States Navy, all of them named in honor of Andrew Ellicot Kennedy Benham.

- USS Benham (DD-49), was an Aylwin-class destroyer.
- USS Benham (DD-397), was the lead destroyer of the Benham class, which sank in battle during 1942.
- USS Benham (DD-796), was a Fletcher-class destroyer during World War II.
