= USS Parker (DD-48) =

Aylwin-class destroyer

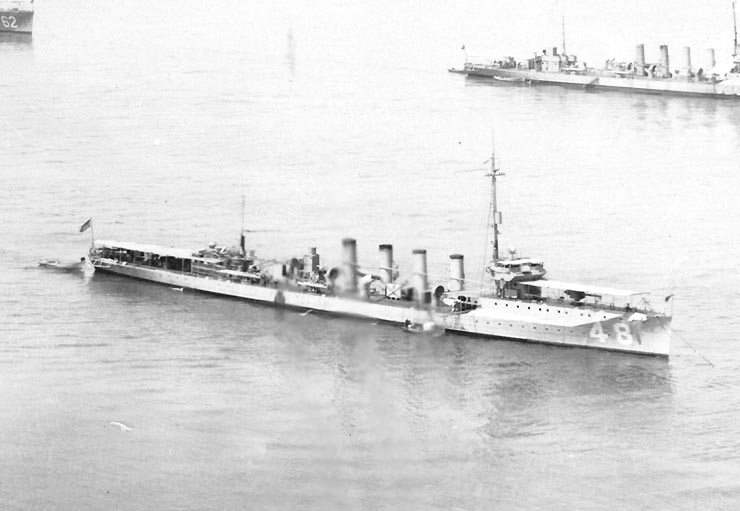
- USS Parker (DD-48) off New York City in May 1921

History

United States
- Name: Parker
- Namesake: Commodore Foxhall A. Parker, Jr.
- Ordered: March 1911
- Builder: William Cramp & Sons; Philadelphia
- Cost: $760,068.39 (hull and machinery)
- Yard number: 384
- Laid down: 11 March 1912
- Launched: 8 February 1913
- Sponsored by: Mrs. Henry W. Hand
- Commissioned: 20 January 1914
- Decommissioned: 6 June 1922
- Stricken: 8 March 1935
- Identification: Hull symbol:DD-48; Code letters:NIX
- Fate: scrapped after 23 April 1935

General characteristics
- Class & type: Aylwin-class destroyer
- Displacement: 1,036 long tons (1,053 t)
- Length: 305 ft 3 in (93.04 m)
- Beam: 30 ft 4 in (9.25 m)
- Draft: 9 ft 5 in (2.87 m) (mean)
- Installed power: 4 × boilers; 16,000 shp (12,000 kW)
- Propulsion: 2 × direct-drive steam turbines; 2 × screw propellers
- Speed: 29.5 kn (33.9 mph; 54.6 km/h); 29.55 kn (34.01 mph; 54.73 km/h) (Speed on Trial)
- Complement: 5 officers 96 enlisted
- Armament: 4 × 4 in (100 mm)/50 caliber guns; 8 × 18 inch (450 mm) torpedo tubes (4 × 2); 2 × 0.30 in (7.62 mm) machine guns

USS Parker (Destroyer No. 48/DD-48) was an Aylwin-class destroyer built for the United States Navy prior to the American entry into World War I. The ship was the first U.S. Navy vessel named in honor of Foxhall A. Parker, Jr., a U.S. Navy officer who served in the American Civil War, and as Superintendent of United States Naval Academy.

Parker was laid down by William Cramp & Sons of Philadelphia in March 1912 and launched in February 1913. The ship was a little more than 305 ft (93 m) in length, just over 30 ft (9.1 m) abeam, and had a standard displacement of 1,036 long tons (1,053 t). She was armed with four 4 in (100 mm) guns and had eight 18 inch (450 mm) torpedo tubes. Parker was powered by a pair of steam turbines that propelled her at up to 29.5 kn (33.9 mph; 54.6 km/h).

After her January 1914 commissioning, she assisted her sister ship Aylwin when that ship suffered an explosion in one of her fire rooms in April. After the U.S. entered World War I in April 1917, Parker served as an escort for the fourth group of the first American troop convoy of the war. Afterwards, she patrolled the Irish Sea out of Queenstown, Ireland. Parker rescued nine survivors of a torpedoed British hospital ship in February 1918, and her crew received accolades from the British Parliament, the Admiralty, and U.S. Navy officials.

Upon returning to the U.S. after the war in July 1919, Parker rejoined the Atlantic Fleet. Parker was decommissioned in June 1922. She was struck from the Naval Vessel Register in March 1935, and ordered scrapped in April.

== Design and construction ==
Parker was authorized in March 1911 as the third of four ships of the Aylwin class, which was almost identical to the Cassin-class destroyers authorized at the same time. (Note: The Aylwin class is considered a part of the Cassin class by Conway's All the World's Fighting Ships 1906–1921 (p. 122), but is classed separately by the United States Navy. See, for example, Naval History & Heritage Command. "Aylwin". Dictionary of American Naval Fighting Ships. Navy Department, Naval History and Heritage Command.) Construction of the vessel — like her three sister ships — was awarded to William Cramp & Sons of Philadelphia which laid down her keel on 11 March 1912. On 8 February 1913, Parker was launched by sponsor Mrs. Henry W. Hand, wife of the vice president of the Cramp shipyard. The ship was the first U.S. Navy vessel to be named for Foxhall A. Parker, Jr., a U.S. Navy officer who served in the American Civil War, and as Superintendent of United States Naval Academy; he was also a co-founder of the United States Naval Institute. As built, the destroyer was 305 ft 3 in (93.04 m) in length, 30 ft 4 in (9.25 m) abeam, and drew 9 ft 5 in (2.87 m). The ship had a standard displacement of 1,036 long tons (1,053 t) and displaced 1,235 long tons (1,255 t) when fully loaded.

Parker had two steam turbines that drove her two screw propellers, and an additional pair triple-expansion steam engines, each connected to one of the propeller shafts, for cruising purposes. Four oil-burning boilers powered the engines, which could generate 16,000 shp (12,000 kW), moving the ship at the design speed of 29.5 kn (33.9 mph; 54.6 km/h); After sister ship Aylwin failed to meet the design speed in her July 1913 builder's trials, Parker was outfitted with redesigned propellers, and exceeded the contracted speed in her trials in November, when she topped out at 30.33 kn (34.90 mph; 56.17 km/h) during runs off the Delaware Breakwater.

Parker's main battery consisted of four 4 in (100 mm)/50 caliber Mark 9 guns, (Note: The 50 denotes the length of the gun barrels; in this case, the gun is 50 calibers, meaning that the gun is 50 times as long as its bore, or 200 in (5.1 m) in this case. The Mark number is the version of the gun; in this case, the ninth U.S. Navy design of the 4-inch/50 gun.) with each gun weighing in excess of 6,100 lb (2,800 kg). The guns fired 33 lb (15 kg) armor-piercing projectiles at 2,900 ft/s (880 m/s). At an elevation of 20°, the guns had a range of 15,920 yd (14,560 m). Parker was also equipped with four twin mount 18 in (460 mm) torpedo tubes.

== Pre-World War I ==
Parker was commissioned into the United States Navy on 30 December 1913. Parker was attached to the Torpedo Flotilla, Atlantic Fleet, operating off the Atlantic coast during the years of American neutrality in World War I. On 6 April 1914, Parker and sister ships Aylwin and Benham were exercising off the North Carolina coast, about 15 nmi (17 mi; 28 km) off the Diamond Shoals lightship. An explosion ripped through the forward fire room on Aylwin, injuring three men. Benham loaded the three wounded sailors and sped to the naval hospital at Norfolk, Virginia, while Parker took on the remainder of Aylwin's crew. One of the injured men died on Benham before landfall was made in Virginia; another died a short time later. Aylwin remained afloat but, unmanned, was towed into Norfolk by Parker and U.S. Navy tug Sonoma. The crews of all three destroyers raised $250 to help defray funeral expenses for the widow of one of the men.

In early April 1915, Parker and destroyer McDougal were temporarily assigned to patrol near the New York City Quarantine Station. There were concerns by Dudley Field Malone, the local port collector, that some of the interned German steamships at New York might try to slip out during a heavy snowstorm. As a part of these patrols, Malone discovered what The New York Times termed a "widespread conspiracy" intended to supply British warships outside U.S. territorial waters, in violation of the American neutrality in World War I.

After participating in winter maneuvers in Cuban waters in early 1917, Parker joined the fleet at Yorktown, Virginia, in March, immediately prior to the American entry into World War I.

== World War I ==
After the U.S. entered World War I on 6 April 1917, Parker was selected for overseas duty. She sailed on 17 June as an escort for the fourth group of the first American convoy, which carried units of the American Expeditionary Force. (Note: The individual groups of the first convoy were typically counted as separate convoys in post-war sources. See, for example, Crowell and Wilson, Appendix G, p. 603.) The convoy consisted of United States Army transports Montanan, Dakotan, El Occidente, and Edward Luckenbach; U.S. Navy transport Hancock; and oiler Kanawha. The escorts — in addition to Parker — were the cruisers St. Louis, and destroyers Ammen, Flusser, and Shaw. The group departed from New York for Brest, France, steaming at an 11 kn (13 mph; 20 km/h) pace. A thwarted submarine attack on the first convoy group, and reports of heavy submarine activity off of Brest, resulted in a change in the convoy's destination to Saint-Nazaire where the convoy arrived 2 July.

From St. Nazaire, Parker steamed to Queenstown, Ireland, joining the U.S. Naval Forces patrolling the Irish Coast. There she escorted convoys safely through the war zone, and assisted vessels in distress. From July–November 1918, Parker was attached to the base at Plymouth, England, and operated with U.S. submarine chasers. Parker made contact with German submarines on several occasions during the war. She was credited with probably seriously damaging an enemy submarine on 3 August 1917.

On 26 February 1918, Parker assisted in rescuing nine survivors of British hospital ship Glenart Castle, which had been torpedoed by German submarine UC-56. The men of Parker were commended by the British Parliament, the Admiralty, and the U.S. naval authorities. On 1 November, Parker sailed from Plymouth for Gibraltar but returned to Plymouth at the end of the war.

== Postwar ==
After returning to Plymouth after the Armistice was signed, Parker carried mail and passengers between Plymouth and Brest. She made a cruise to German ports in early 1919 to implement the terms of the armistice, before steaming to the Baltic Sea to assist members and vessels of the American Relief Administration. Parker sailed for New York on 20 July 1919 and, upon arrival, was assigned to Destroyer Squadron 1, Atlantic Fleet.

The destroyer was based out of Norfolk, Virginia from 1919-mid-1921. In July 1920, Parker was operating in the Mediterranean when she played a role in the search for an American missionary couple, Paul Nilson and Harriet Fisher Nilson, thought abducted by Turkish Nationalists. Parker was sent to Mersina to demand the release of the pair, and dispatched messages by airplane to Tarsus and Adana to that effect. (Note: The Nilsons were apparently released unharmed and continued to teach in Turkey until retiring and returning to the U.S. in 1957. See: "Nilson-Fyfe Papers, 1911–1957". Girnnell College. April 2009.)

After making a final cruise to Newport, Rhode Island, in mid 1921, Parker was decommissioned on 6 June 1922. After 13 years in reserve, the ship was struck from the Naval Vessel Register on 8 March 1935, and, on 23 April, was ordered scrapped.
