= Andrew E. K. Benham =

American naval officer (1832–1905)

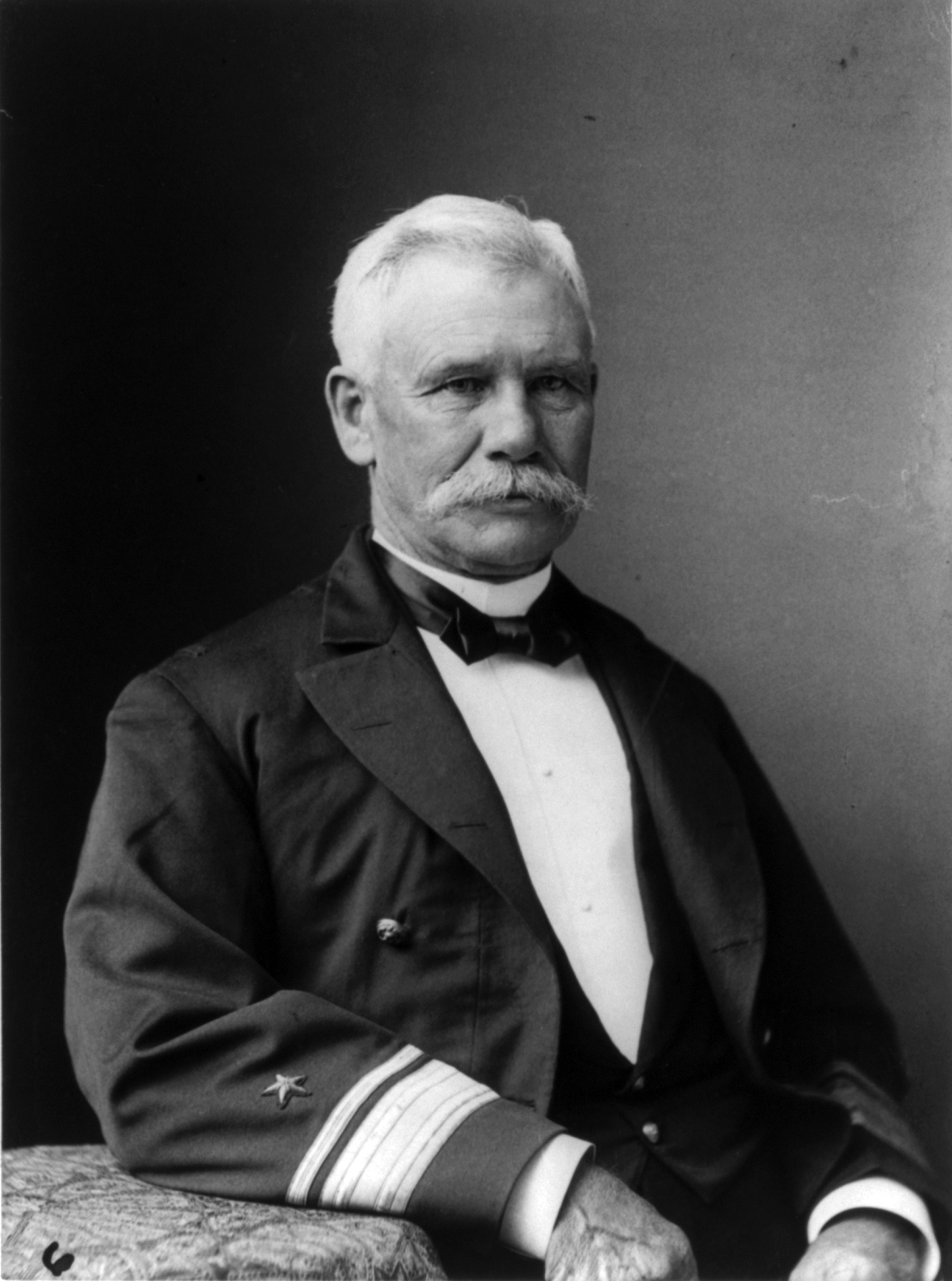
- Andrew E. K. Benham
- Born: Andrew Ellicott Kennedy Benham; April 10, 1832; Staten Island, New York, U.S.
- Died: August 11, 1905 (aged 73); Mahopac, New York, U.S.
- Burial place: Arlington National Cemetery
- Military career
- Allegiance: United States of America
- Branch: United States Navy
- Service years: 1847–1894
- Rank: Rear admiral
- Conflicts: Paraguay expedition; American Civil War; Battle of Port Royal; Blockade of the South; Revolta da Armada

Andrew Ellicott Kennedy Benham (April 10, 1832 – August 11, 1905) was an American rear admiral. In his early career, he served in China, the Pacific and Paraguay. During the American Civil War, he took part in the capture of Port Royal, South Carolina, and patrolled the Texas coast as part of the West Gulf Blockading Squadron.

== Early life ==
Andrew Ellicott Kennedy Benham was born on April 10, 1832, in Staten Island, New York, near New Dorp. He was the son of Navy Commander Timothy Green Benham and Juliet Lockman.

== Early career ==
Benham was appointed a midshipman on November 24, 1847, and served in the East Indies Squadron on board the sloop-of-war Plymouth in 1847 and 1848 and on board the brig Dolphin in 1849 and 1850. In the latter warship, he participated in the capture of a pirate Chinese junk near Macau, China. During this action, he received a pike wound in the thigh. After another tour of duty in Plymouth followed by one in the frigate Saranac, Benham attended the U.S. Naval Academy and graduated in 1853.

== Paraguay expedition ==
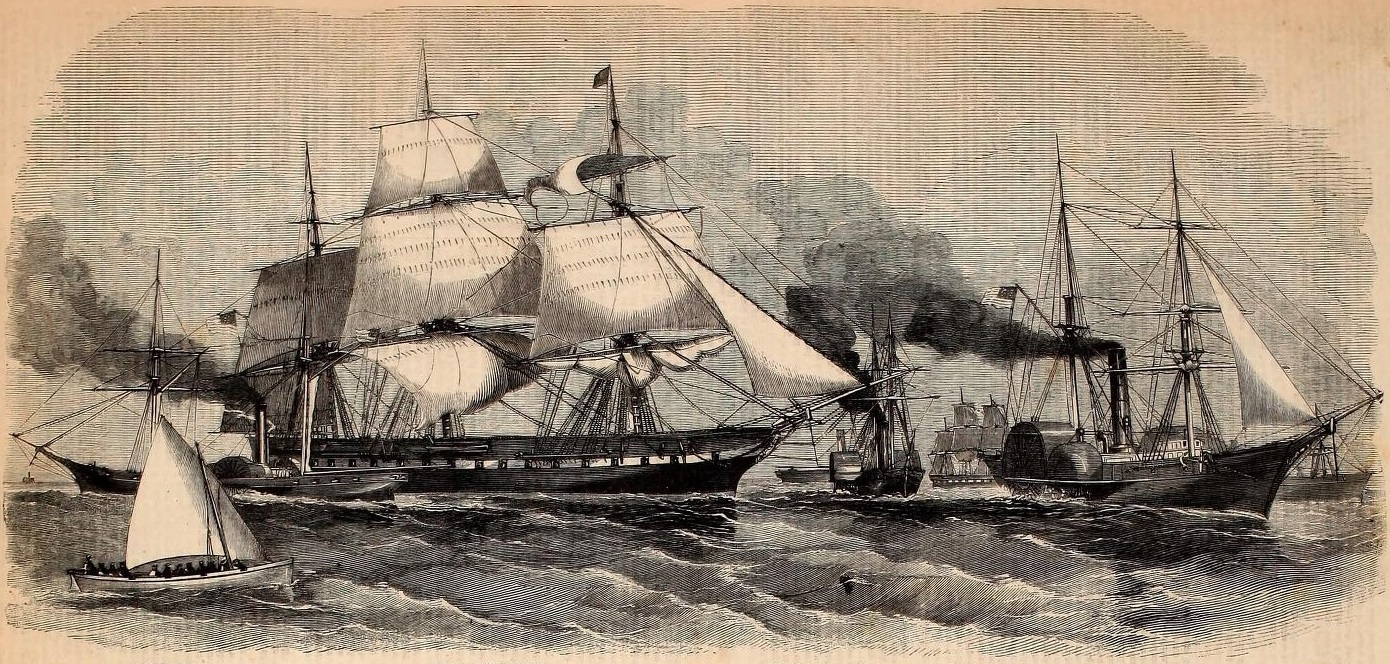
The Paraguay Squadron (Harper's Weekly, 1858)

On June 10, 1853, he was promoted to passed midshipman. From mid-1853 to early 1857, he served in the sloop of war USS St. Mary's with the Pacific Squadron. On September 16, 1855, while still in St. Mary's, Benham was commissioned a lieutenant. He next served a tour of duty with the United States Coast Survey late in 1857 and early in 1858. Later that year, he was transferred to the steamer Western Port (renamed Wyandotte) assigned to the expedition sent to Paraguay to extract an apology for shooting at the gunboat Water Witch. In 1860, he moved to the steamer Crusader in the Home Squadron.

== American Civil War ==
In October 1861, Benham joined the steamer Bienville in the South Atlantic Blockading Squadron and, in her, participated in the Battle of Port Royal, on November 7, 1861. Benham was promoted to lieutenant commander on July 16, 1862. Following brief service on the sloop USS Sacramento (1862) as a part of the blockade, in September 1863, he assumed command of the gunboat Penobscot and served in her through July 1865, patrolling the Texas coast as part of the West Gulf Blockading Squadron.

== Post-Civil War ==
After the war, he served at the New York Navy Yard from 1866 to 1870, but for a stint of duty in Susquehanna in 1867. During this time, he was promoted to commander. Following duty as a lighthouse inspector in 1870 and 1871, Benham commanded first Canonicus and then Saugus, both on the North Atlantic Station and returned to lighthouse inspecting in 1874. He was promoted to captain in March 1875. After commanding Richmond on the Asiatic Station between 1878 and 1881, he went to the Portsmouth Navy Yard. The years 1885 and 1886 brought him his third tour of duty as lighthouse inspector. During this period, he was promoted to commodore. Following a tour of duty at League Island, Pennsylvania, in 1888, he became commandant of the Mare Island Navy Yard in 1889. In February 1890, he was promoted to rear admiral.

In 1892, Benham went to Spain on the USS Newark in commemoration of the 400th Anniversary of Columbus' sailing. He was known for breaking the blockade of the Port of Rio de Janeiro during the Revolta da Armada in 1893. He participated in the investigation against Rear Admiral Winfield Scott Schley after the Battle of Santiago. Benham commanded the North Atlantic Station from June 30, 1893 to January 1894 and commanded the South Atlantic Station from January 12 to April 10, 1894, when he was placed on the retired list. He afterward served as prize commissioner for the Georgia district from July 1898 to February 6, 1899, and was a member of the Board of Awards.

== Personal life ==
He married Emma Hester Seaman (1833–1924), the daughter of Henry John Seaman (1805–1861) and Katherine Sarah (née Seaman) Seaman (1813–1896). They had three children: a daughter who died in infancy c. 1866; Henry Kennedy Benham born in 1867 and who died of appendicitis in 1904; and Edith Wallace Benham (1874–1962), who married James Meredith Helm and served for 25 years as the Social Secretary for the White House under Woodrow Wilson, Franklin Delano Roosevelt, and Harry Truman.

After retiring, Benham lived at 1315 20th Street NW in Washington, D.C. In April 1897, his house on Fresh Kill Road in Staten Island burned down. Benham died on August 11, 1905, at his summer home in Mahopac, New York. He was buried in Arlington National Cemetery.

== Namesakes ==
Three U.S. Navy ships have subsequently been named in his honor:

- Benham (DD-49), an Aylwin-class destroyer launched in 1913.
- Benham (DD-397), the lead destroyer of the Benham class, which sank in battle in 1942.
- Benham (DD-796), a Fletcher-class destroyer which operated during World War II.

The Benham Rise in the Philippine Sea west of Luzon was named after him.

== See also ==
- Paraguay expedition

Military offices
Preceded by John G. Walker	Commander-in-Chief, North Atlantic Squadron; June 1893–April 1894	Succeeded by Richard W. Meade III
