= Aylwin-class destroyer =

Destroyer class of the US Navy

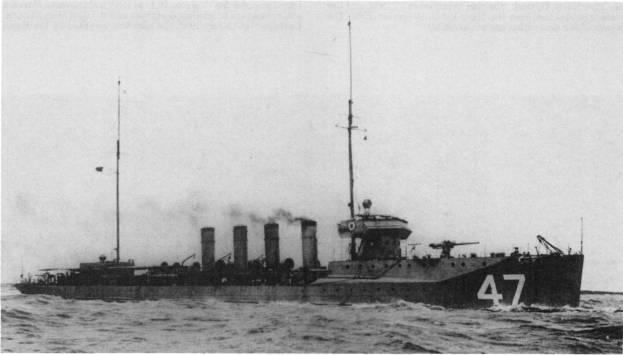
- USS Aylwin circa 1916–17

Class overview
- Name: Aylwin class
- Builders: William Cramp & Sons, Philadelphia
- Operators: United States Navy
- Preceded by: Cassin class
- Succeeded by: O'Brien class
- Built: 1912–14
- In commission: 1913–22
- Completed: 4
- Retired: 4

General characteristics
- Type: Destroyer
- Displacement: 1,036 tons (normal); 1,165 (full load)
- Length: 305 ft 3 in (93.04 m)
- Beam: 30 ft 4 in (9.25 m)
- Draft: 9 ft 5 in (2.87 m)
- Installed power: 4 × White-Forster boilers; 2 × direct-drive Cramp steam turbines; 16,000 shp (12,000 kW) (design)
- Propulsion: 2 × shafts
- Speed: 29.6 kn (54.8 km/h; 34.1 mph) (trials)
- Capacity: 307 tons oil (fuel)
- Complement: 8 officers; 8 Chief Petty Officers; 90 enlisted
- Armament: 4 × 4 in (102 mm)/50 caliber guns; 4 × twin 18 inch (450 mm) torpedo tubes

The Aylwin class was a class of four destroyers in the United States Navy; all served as convoy escorts during World War I. The Aylwins were the second of five "second-generation" 1000-ton four-stack destroyer classes that were front-line ships of the Navy until the 1920s. They were known as "thousand tonners". All were scrapped in 1935 to comply with the London Naval Treaty.

All four ships were built by William Cramp & Sons in Philadelphia.

These ships were built concurrently with the Cassin class and in some references are considered to be in that class. In design and armament they were essentially repeats of the Cassin class.

== Design ==
Unlike the other "thousand tonner" classes, the Aylwins were not a significant improvement on the previous class.

=== Armament ===
They retained the Cassins' armament of four 4-inch (102 mm)/50 caliber Mark 9 guns and eight 18-inch (450 mm) torpedo tubes in twin broadside mounts. Compared with the previous Paulding class of the "flivver" type, the increased gun armament reflected the increasing size of foreign destroyers they might have to fight. The broadside (two twin mounts each side) torpedo armament reflected the General Board's desire to have some torpedoes remaining after firing a broadside. The class was probably equipped with one or two depth charge racks each for anti-submarine convoy escort missions in World War I. Benham was equipped with four twin 4-inch mounts in 1917, but these were replaced with single mounts before she deployed overseas. By 1929 all except Parker had a 3-inch (76 mm)/23 caliber anti-aircraft gun added.

=== Engineering ===
The ships were equipped with four White-Forster boilers supplying steam to two Cramp direct-drive steam turbines driving two shafts for 16,000 shp (12,000 kW) as designed; all of the class exceeded this on trials. Compound steam engines could be clutched to the shafts for economical medium-speed cruising. Aylwin achieved 29.6 knots (54.8 km/h; 34.1 mph) on trials at 16,286 shp (12,144 kW); this was typical for the others of the class. Normal fuel oil capacity was 307 tons.

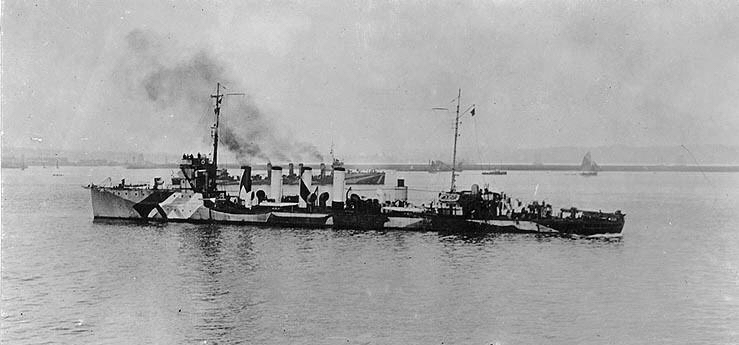
Benham in dazzle camouflage during World War I.

== Ships in class ==
Ships of the Aylwin destroyer class
Name	Hull no.	Shipyard	Laid down	Launched	Commissioned	Decommissioned	Fate
Aylwin	DD-47	William Cramp & Sons, Philadelphia	7 March 1912	23 November 1912	17 January 1914	23 February 1921	Scrapped 1935
Parker	DD-48	William Cramp & Sons	11 March 1912	8 February 1913	30 December 1913	6 June 1922	Scrapped 1935
Benham	DD-49	William Cramp & Sons	14 March 1912	22 March 1913	20 Jan 1914	7 July 1922	Scrapped 1935
Balch	DD-50	William Cramp & Sons	7 May 1912	21 December 1912	26 March 1914	20 June 1922	Scrapped 1935

== See also ==
- Cassin-class destroyer

== Bibliography ==
- Bauer, K. Jack; Roberts, Stephen S. (1991). Register of Ships of the U.S. Navy, 1775–1990: Major Combatants. Westport, Connecticut: Greenwood Press. ISBN 0-313-26202-0.
- Friedman, Norman (2004). US Destroyers: An Illustrated Design History (Revised ed.). Annapolis: Naval Institute Press. ISBN 1-55750-442-3.
- Gardiner, Robert; Gray, Randal (1985). Conway's All the World's Fighting Ships 1906-1921. London: Conway Maritime Press. ISBN 0-85177-245-5.
- Jane's Fighting Ships of World War I. London: Random House Group, Ltd. 2001. ISBN 1-85170-378-0.
- Silverstone, Paul H. (1970). U.S. Warships of World War I. London: Ian Allan. ISBN 0-71100-095-6.
