= Austin M. Knight =

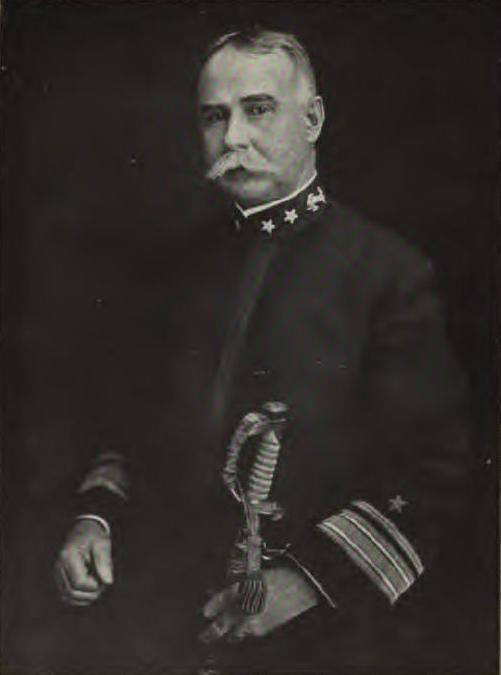
- Admiral Austin M. Knight
- Born: December 16, 1854; Ware, Massachusetts, U.S.
- Died: February 26, 1927 (aged 72); Washington, D.C., U.S.
- Military career
- Allegiance: United States of America
- Branch: United States Navy
- Service years: 1873–1918
- Rank: Admiral
- Commands: US Asiatic Fleet
- Conflicts: Spanish–American War; World War I Siberian Intervention
- Awards: Navy Distinguished Service Medal; Grand Cordon of the Rising Sun

Austin Melvin Knight (December 16, 1854 – February 26, 1927) was an admiral in the United States Navy. He was commander in chief of the U.S. Asiatic Fleet from 1917 to 1918. His 1901 textbook Modern Seamanship was a standard reference for over eight decades.

== Early career ==
Born in Ware, Massachusetts, to future American Civil War veteran Charles Sanford Knight and Cordelia Cutter Knight, Austin Melvin Knight was appointed to the U.S. Naval Academy from Florida on June 30, 1869, graduating in 1873. After service as a passed midshipman, he was commissioned ensign on July 16, 1874. He served in various sea and shore assignments over the next two decades, including tours at the Naval Academy, and in Tuscarora, Constellation, Chicago, Monongahela, and Lancaster.

During the Spanish–American War Knight served as navigator aboard the new monitor Puritan, participating in the blockade of Cuba and the taking of Puerto Rico in 1898. After attending the Naval War College at Newport in 1901, he commanded the armed yacht Yankton off the Cuban coast from 1901 to 1903, and the gunboat Castine in the Atlantic from 1903 to 1904. During the next three years, he presided over a naval ordnance board and a joint Army-Navy board on smokeless powder. Knight was promoted to captain in 1907 and given command of the armored cruiser Washington in the Pacific. He resumed the presidency of the naval ordnance board in 1909.

== Court martial ==
In November 1910, the monitor Puritan was wrecked by an explosion of four hundred pounds of gelatin during ordnance tests being conducted under Knight's direction. The board of inquiry reported that the monitor had been allowed to sink into the mud despite having remained afloat for twenty-two hours, subsequently requiring the services of a wrecking company to raise. Congress blamed Knight for this perceived lapse and ordered that he be prosecuted for "culpable negligence and inefficiency in the performance of duty". A court-martial of seven rear admirals convened at the Norfolk Navy Yard, and honorably acquitted Knight. Secretary of the Navy George von Lengerke Meyer disapproved the finding and referred the case back to the court for reconsideration, but the court reaffirmed Knight's acquittal and he was restored to active duty.

Knight was placed under arrest while on trial, and his wife fell ill and died during his detainment. The court-martial also threatened to derail his previously scheduled promotion to rear admiral. His private and professional travails coupled with the perception that he had been scapegoated by the political establishment made him a sympathetic figure among his fellow officers.

== Flag rank ==
Following his acquittal, Knight was promoted to rear admiral in May 1911 (backdated to January 29) and assigned to command the Narragansett Bay Naval Station. He served as commander in chief of the Atlantic Reserve Fleet from 1912 to 1913, interrupted by temporary duty to command a special squadron consisting of the armored cruisers Tennessee and Montana that was dispatched to the Eastern Mediterranean in November 1912 to protect American citizens in Turkey during the Balkan War.

As President of the Naval War College from December 15, 1913, to February 16, 1917, Knight was extensively quoted in Hudson Maxim's influential 1915 book Defenseless America, which exhorted America to rearm.

Knight aligned himself with naval reformers such as Bradley Fiske and William Sims who agitated for a navy general staff headed by a strong chief of naval operations with authority to command both the line and the bureaus. President Woodrow Wilson and Secretary of the Navy Josephus Daniels strongly opposed the idea, and Wilson instructed Daniels to reprimand Knight after he publicly advocated a general staff in a speech in New York City.

== Commander in Chief, U.S. Asiatic Fleet ==
On May 22, 1917, Knight raised his flag aboard the armored cruiser Brooklyn as commander in chief of the Asiatic Fleet with the temporary rank of admiral. He directed American naval operations during the Allied intervention at Vladivostok during the Russian Civil War, and was chairman of the ten-nation council tasked with preserving order in the Russian Far East.

Knight relinquished command on December 7, 1918, and reverted to his permanent rank of rear admiral. He transferred to the retired list on December 16, 1918.

== Knight Board of Awards ==
Knight was recalled to active duty from March 13, 1919, until June 30, 1920, to serve as Senior Member of the Board of Awards. No medals had been awarded for naval service during World War I prior to the armistice, so on March 6, 1919, Secretary Daniels appointed Knight to head a board to review all recommendations of commanding officers for the Medal of Honor, Distinguished Service Medal, and Navy Cross, and to submit a uniform list of recommended honors. The board comprised Knight and eight other retired officers, a roster that drew harsh criticism as most of the board members had retired prior to America's entry into the war and none had any personal familiarity with conditions in the war zone. (Knight himself had spent the war in a distant theater.)

The Knight Board was in session from March 17, 1919, to October 31, 1919, when it was suddenly dissolved by Secretary Daniels before completing its work and before many of the most important recommendations had been received. Daniels disregarded most of the board's recommendations and drew up his own list of awards. Daniels' list aroused immediate outrage for its perceived caprice; in particular, every commanding officer of a ship that had been sunk by the enemy received the Distinguished Service Medal, while many commanding officers of ships that sank enemy vessels received no medal. Many officers refused the medals awarded them, most prominently Admiral William Sims. Daniels hastily reconvened the Knight Board, but the second session's recommendations fared little better than the first, as the final decision over which medals to award remained the sole prerogative of the Secretary of the Navy.

The awards fiasco led directly to the creation of a largely independent Navy Department Board of Decorations and Medals.

== Legacy ==
Knight died February 26, 1927, at Washington, D.C., and was buried at the Naval Academy Cemetery. He was President of the Naval Historical Foundation from 1926 until his death. On November 17, 1930, he was posthumously advanced to admiral on the retired list with date of rank February 26, 1927, in recognition of his World War I service.

Knight was awarded the Distinguished Service Medal for meritorious service as commander in chief of the Asiatic Fleet during Allied naval operations at Vladivostok, Siberia. He was awarded the Grand Cordon of the Rising Sun by the government of Japan.

In 1901, Knight wrote Modern Seamanship, a guide to shiphandling and safety which became famous as the sailor's bible for pleasure boaters and professional seamen alike. The textbook was repeatedly updated for over eighty years, publishing its eighteenth edition in 1988.

Knight married Alice Tobey, step-daughter of Wisconsin Governor Harrison Ludington, in Milwaukee, Wisconsin, on January 3, 1878. Alice died the following year, a few days after giving birth to their daughter, also named Alice.

Several years later, at Annapolis, Maryland, on April 29, 1886, Knight married Elizabeth Harwood Welsh. He and Elizabeth had three children, Dorothy, Richard, and Katharine, the latter of whom married World War II amphibious commander Rear Admiral Forrest B. Royal. A younger sister, Bertha Knight Landes, served as mayor of Seattle, Washington, from 1926 to 1928, the first female mayor of a major American city. Another younger sister, Jessie Knight Jordan, married Stanford University president David Starr Jordan.

== Namesake ==
He was the namesake of the destroyer USS Knight (DD-633), launched on September 27, 1941, and sponsored by his granddaughter, Elizabeth H. Royal.

== Dates of rank ==
- Midshipman – June 30, 1869
- Passed Midshipman – May 31, 1873
- Ensign – July 16, 1874
- Master – October 27, 1879
- Lieutenant, Junior Grade – March 3, 1883
- Lieutenant – December 19, 1885
- Lieutenant Commander – March 3, 1899
- Commander – June 16, 1902
- Captain – 1907
- Rear Admiral – January 29, 1911
- Admiral – May 22, 1917

== Notes ==
Military offices
Preceded by William Ledyard Rodgers	President of the Naval War College; 15 December 1913 – 16 February 1917	Succeeded by William S. Sims
Preceded by Albert G. Winterhalter	Commander-in-Chief, United States Asiatic Fleet; 22 May 1917 – 7 December 1918	Succeeded by William Ledyard Rodgers
