= SS Stephano =

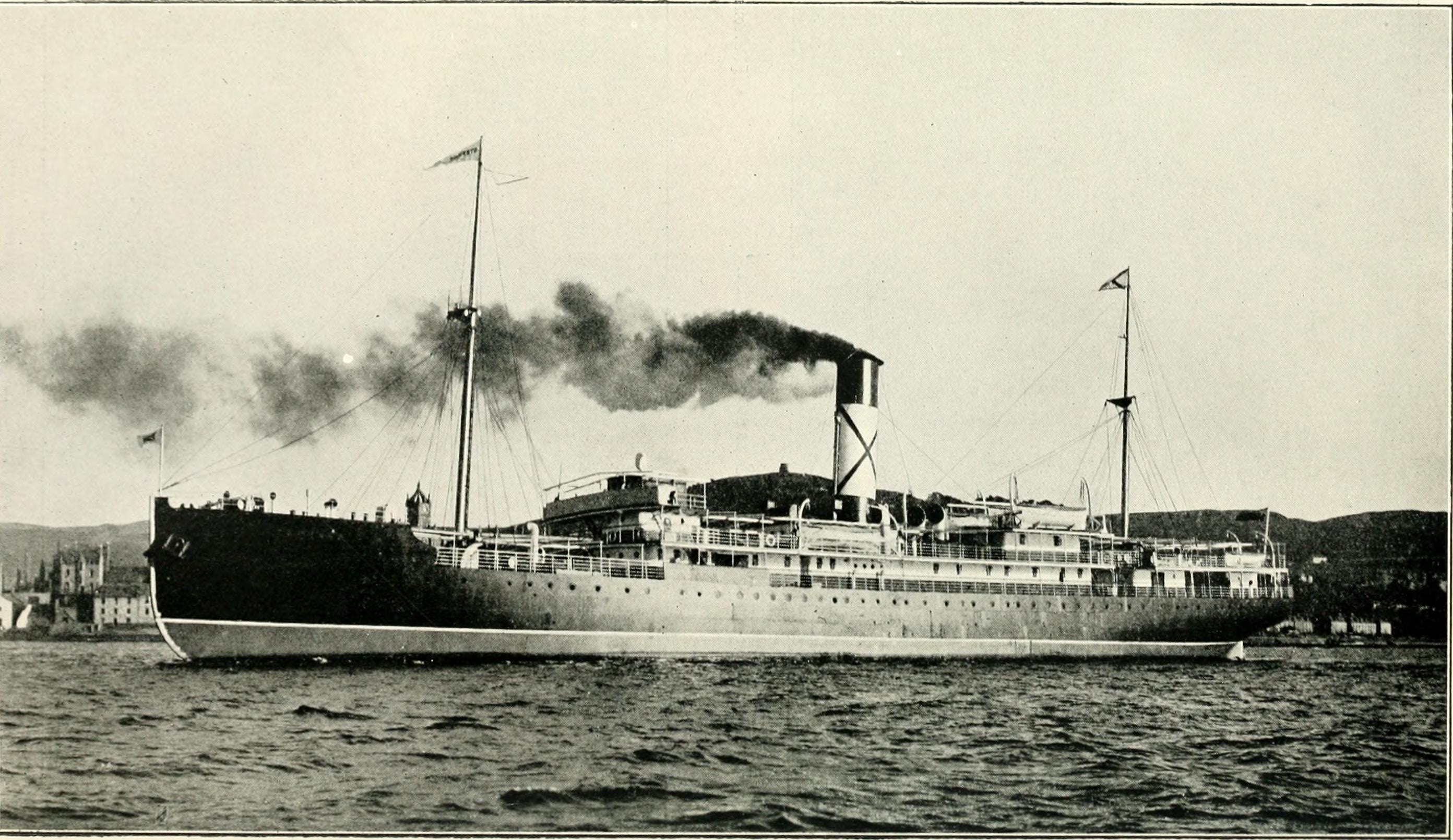

History

United Kingdom
- Name: Stephano
- Owner: Bowring Brothers
- Builder: Charles Cornell & Co. Ltd. Scotstoun
- Yard number: 341
- Launched: 2 May 1911 Glasgow, Scotland
- Completed: June 1911
- In service: 1911
- Out of service: 8 October 1916
- Identification: Official Number 131350
- Fate: Torpedoed and sunk near Nantucket, United States

General characteristics
- Tonnage: 3,449 GRT; 2,144 NRT
- Length: 326.1 ft (99.4 m)
- Beam: 46.3 ft (14.1 m)
- Depth: 19.9 ft (6.1 m)
- Installed power: 1 × 3 cyl. triple expansion steam engine, single shaft. output: 577 nhp
- Propulsion: 1 screw
- Speed: 13 knots (24 km/h; 15 mph)
- Capacity: 180 1st class passengers; 60 2nd class passengers

SS Stephano was a passenger liner and sealing ship, owned by Bowring Brothers and operated in their Red Cross Line of Arctic steamships. Stephano is most notable for her role in the 1914 Newfoundland Sealing Disaster, under the command of Captain Abram Kean. Stephano was the sister ship to the SS Florizel.

== History ==
=== Early career ===
Stephano served in Bowring Brothers' Red Cross Line as a passenger steamer, and cargo vessel, between New York City and St. John's, Newfoundland, from 1911 until her sinking in 1916.

=== 1914 Newfoundland Sealing Disaster ===
During the 1914 sealing season, Stephano was under the command of Captain Abram Kean, a renowned sealing captain with a reputation of bringing home record breaking hauls of seal. Capt. Kean's son, Westbury Kean, was the captain of the SS Newfoundland at the time, and the two agreed to alert each other of the locations of packs of seal, despite working for separate companies.

After becoming stuck in the ice, Westbury Kean ordered his crew onto the ice to travel to the Stephano. Upon reaching the Stephano, the crew of the Newfoundland were welcomed onboard and fed lunch. Abram Kean then moved the Stephano to a pack of seals and ordered the Newfoundland crew over the side. Kean left the crew and the Stephano traveled elsewhere. The crew of the Newfoundland were left on the ice for two days and nights, during a major storm, resulting in the deaths of 77 men.

=== First World War ===
On 20 March 1915, Stephano transported D Company of the First Newfoundland Regiment to Halifax, Nova Scotia, where they boarded the SS Orduña to Great Britain.

=== Sinking ===
On 8 October 1916, Stephano was torpedoed by the German submarine, SM U-53, 2.5 miles (4.0 km) east-north-east of Nantucket, Massachusetts. As a result, the vessel sunk; however, there were no casualties of the 94 passengers. Stephano was one of five vessels sunk by U-53 that day.
