= USS Melville (AD-2) =

Tender of the United States Navy

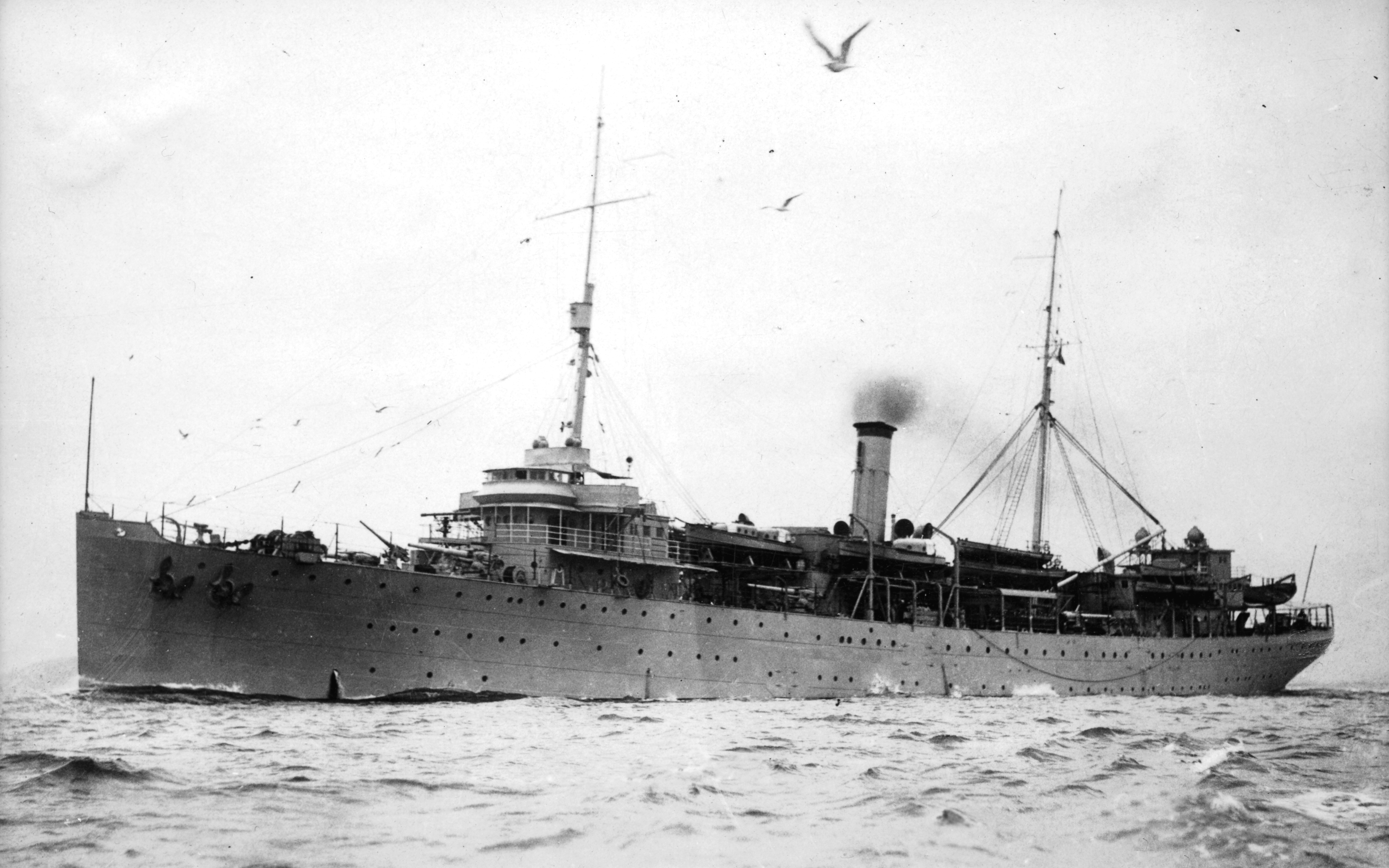
- USS Melville (AD-2) in 1929

History

United States
- Name: USS Melville
- Namesake: George W. Melville
- Builder: New York Shipbuilding, Camden, New Jersey
- Laid down: 11 November 1913
- Launched: 2 March 1913
- Commissioned: 3 December 1915
- Decommissioned: 9 August 1946
- Stricken: 23 April 1947
- Fate: Sold for scrapping, 19 August 1948

General characteristics
- Type: Destroyer tender
- Displacement: 7,150 long tons (7,265 t)
- Length: 417 ft 3 in (127.18 m)
- Beam: 54 ft 5.5 in (16.599 m)
- Draft: 20 ft (6.1 m)
- Propulsion: 2 × Thornycroft boilers; 2 Parsons geared turbines; 4,000 shp (3,000 kW)
- Speed: 15 kn (28 km/h; 17 mph)
- Complement: 397
- Armament: As Built: •8 × 5 in (127 mm) guns; 1 × 3 in (76 mm) guns; 2 × 3-pounder guns; 1 × 18 in (457 mm) torpedo tube; By World War II: •2 × 5 in (127 mm) guns; 4 × 3 in (76 mm) guns; 4 × 40 mm anti-aircraft guns

USS Melville (AD-2) was a United States Navy destroyer tender that saw service in both World Wars. Laid down by the New York Shipbuilding Corporation of Camden, New Jersey, on 11 November 1913, she was launched on 2 March 1913, sponsored by Miss Helen W. Neel, granddaughter of Rear Admiral George W. Melville; and was first commissioned on 3 December 1915, Comdr. Henry Bertram Price in command.

== Service history ==
=== World War I ===
Assigned to the Atlantic Fleet, Melville reported to Newport, in January 1916. On 11 May 1917, a month after the United States entered World War I, the destroyer tender got underway for Queenstown, Ireland, arriving on the 22nd. She carried out repair and support operations and served as flagship for Vice Admiral William Sims, Commander of U.S. Naval Forces in European waters, from 10 September-4 January 1919.

Melville departed Southampton, England, on 7 January 1919 with troops embarked for the east coast, arriving at New York on the 26th. She then operated at Newport and Guantanamo Bay, Cuba until 30 April, when she departed Tompkinsville, N.Y., for the Azores. There she prepared flying boat NC-4 for the final leg of her long transatlantic journey from New York to Europe and embarked crippled NC-3 for return to the east coast, reaching New York on 10 June.

=== Inter-war period ===
Reassigned to the Pacific Fleet, the destroyer tender stood out from Hampton Roads, Virginia, on 19 July for the west coast. En route one of her boilers exploded injuring six men, five of them fatally. The collier Orion took her in tow for repairs at Balboa, Panama Canal Zone. On 31 October she arrived at her new home port, San Diego, California, for service along the west coast, alternating with training and fleet exercises in the Caribbean and off Hawaii for the next 21 years.

=== World War II ===
With the threat of American involvement in World War II, Melville steamed from the Caribbean for the east coast in November 1940. She arrived at Norfolk on 9 December for operations with the Patrol Force, U.S. Fleet, and was transferred back to the Atlantic Fleet on 1 February 1941. Following intensive training at Guantanamo Bay and Culebra, Puerto Rico, and three weeks of supply duties at Casco Bay, Maine, Melville continued on to Bermuda by 16 September to service neutrality patrol ships until returning to Norfolk on 28 November.

Melville got underway on 12 January 1942 for Europe, reaching Derry, Northern Ireland on 31 January to begin tending escort ships of Allied convoys crossing the submarine infested Atlantic. In the next two years, she also based at Hvalfjörður, Iceland; Recife, Brazil; and Rosneath naval base in Scotland, as well as Newport and Casco Bay, while continuing support services for warships ranging from battleships to landing craft and minesweepers.

On 1 May 1944, Melville sailed from Rosneath for Portland, England to begin the massive task of preparing the Allied minesweepers and landing craft for the Normandy Landings of 6 June. For the next year, she was busy maintaining and repairing landing craft for the Allied push toward Germany.

The destroyer tender was at Portland when Germany surrendered on 7 May 1945. Melville continued her support duties, now servicing the amphibious craft for final operations in the Pacific theater.

On 7 July, Melville steamed for New York arriving the 20th to ready for assignment to the central Pacific. After Japan capitulated on 15 August, she sailed on 1 October for Jacksonville, Florida, where she assisted in the inactivation of escort ships.

She got underway from Jacksonville on 13 July 1946 for Norfolk. Melville decommissioned there on 9 August, was struck from the Navy List on 23 April 1947, and was turned over to the Maritime Commission on 30 March 1948. On 19 August 1948 she was sold to Patapsco Scrap Corp., of Baltimore, Maryland, for scrapping.
