= Cassin-class destroyer =

Destroyer class of the US Navy

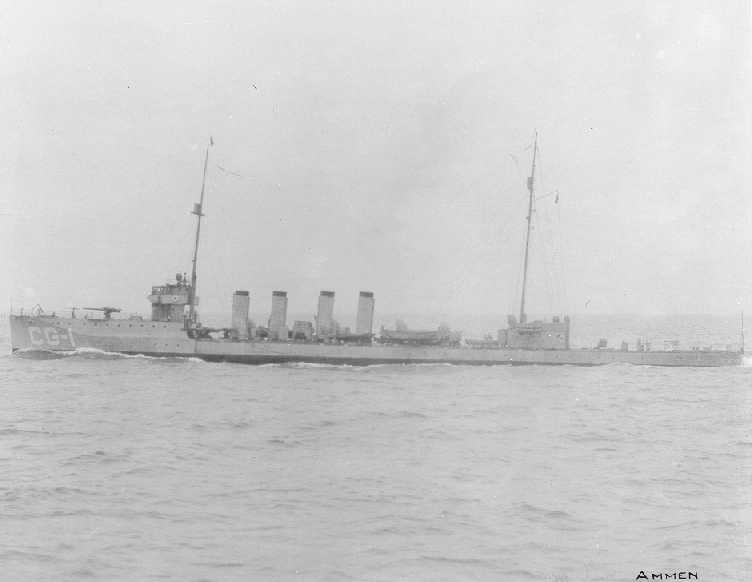
- USS Cassin in Coast Guard service

Class overview
- Name: Cassin class
- Builders: Various
- Operators: United States Navy; United States Coast Guard
- Preceded by: Paulding class
- Succeeded by: Aylwin class
- Built: 1912–1915
- In commission: 1913–33
- Completed: 4
- Retired: 4

General characteristics
- Type: Destroyer
- Displacement: 1,020 tons (normal); 1,139 tons (full load)
- Length: 305 ft 3 in (93.04 m)
- Beam: 30 ft 4 in (9.25 m)
- Draft: 9 ft 3 in (2.82 m)
- Installed power: 4 × Normand boilers (other types also used); 2 × direct-drive Parsons steam turbines; 16,000 shp (12,000 kW) (design)
- Propulsion: 2 × screws
- Speed: 29 knots (54 km/h; 33 mph) (design)
- Capacity: 312 tons oil (fuel)
- Complement: 5 officers, 93 enlisted
- Armament: 4 × 4 in (102 mm)/50 caliber guns; 4 × twin 18 inch (450 mm) torpedo tubes

Four destroyers in the United States Navy comprised the Cassin class. All served as convoy escorts during World War I. The Cassins were the first of five "second-generation" 1000-ton four-stack destroyer classes that were front-line ships of the Navy until the 1930s. They were known as "thousand tonners" for their normal displacement, while the previous classes were nicknamed "flivvers" for their small size, after the Model T Ford.

They were the first to carry the new 4-inch (102 mm)/50 caliber guns. The number of torpedo tubes was increased from the six carried by the Paulding class to eight. The additional armament significantly increased their tonnage to over 1,000 tons and decreased their speed to less than 30 knots (56 km/h; 35 mph), despite an increase from 12,000 shaft horsepower (8,900 kW) to 16,000 shp (12,000 kW).

The Aylwin class was built concurrently, and those four ships are often considered to be Cassins. Both classes were ordered in fiscal year 1912.

The class performed convoy escort missions in the Atlantic in World War I. Hulls 43–45 served in the United States Coast Guard as part of the Rum Patrol in 1924–31. All were scrapped 1934–35 to comply with the London Naval Treaty.

== Design ==
The increase in normal displacement to over 1,000 tons was due to the desire to combine a heavy armament with a substantial cruising range. The US Navy at the time had only three modern scout cruisers of the Chester class, so the destroyers had to double as scouts. The engineering arrangement of two-shaft direct drive turbines was similar to some previous ships, but the poor performance of early cruising turbines caused a reversion to reciprocating engines for cruising. Hulls 43 and 44 had a triple expansion engine that could be clutched to one shaft for cruising; the other pair of ships had a similar arrangement on both shafts.

=== "Thousand tonner" development ===
The "thousand tonner" type included 26 destroyers in five classes: four Cassins, four Aylwins, six O'Briens, six Tuckers, and six Sampsons. The ships were commissioned 1913–17. As the type developed the gun armament of four 4 inch (102 mm) guns remained the same, torpedo armament greatly increased, and displacement rose by about 100 tons. The Cassin and Aylwin classes had eight 18-inch (450 mm) torpedo tubes in twin broadside mounts, two mounts on each side. The O'Briens introduced the 21-inch (533 mm) torpedo to the US destroyer force, but the number of tubes remained at eight. In the Sampsons, torpedo armament was increased to twelve 21 inch (533 mm) tubes by replacing the twin mounts with triple mounts. The subsequent "flush deck" types retained the gun and torpedo armament of the Sampsons on a new hull with displacement increased by about 100 tons, and with a new engineering plant. The thousand tonners also debuted US destroyer anti-aircraft armament: two 1-pounder (37 mm) autocannons were specified for the Tuckers but not fitted until the Sampsons.

In engineering, cruising turbines were re-introduced with the Tucker and Sampson classes. USS Wadsworth had prototype fully geared turbines without cruising turbines; this arrangement was later adopted for the Clemson-class "flush deckers"; other flush deckers had geared turbines with varying cruising arrangements.

=== Armament ===
The gun armament of four 4-inch (102 mm)/50 caliber Mark 9 guns was a significant increase from the five 3-inch (76 mm) guns of the Paulding class, and remained the standard US destroyer gun armament through the "flush deck" Clemson-class destroyers commissioned through 1921. It reflected the increasing size of foreign destroyers that the Cassins might have to fight. The torpedo armament of eight 18-inch (450 mm) torpedo tubes was an increase of two tubes over the Pauldings. A factor in the size of the torpedo armament was the General Board's decision to use broadside rather than centerline torpedo tubes. This was due to the desire to have some torpedoes remaining after firing a broadside, and problems experienced with centerline mounts on previous classes with torpedoes striking the gunwales of the firing ship.

The class was probably equipped with one or two depth charge racks each for anti-submarine convoy escort missions in World War I.

=== Engineering ===
Most references list the propulsion plant of Cassin and Cummings as standard for the class. However, the Navy's official Ships' Data Book for 1912 shows there was some variation. Cassin and Cummings had four Normand boilers supplying steam to two direct-drive Parsons-type steam turbines driving two shafts for a total of 16,000 shp (12,000 kW). A small triple-expansion engine could be clutched to one shaft for economical cruising at moderate speeds. Early steam turbines were inefficient at low speed, and this was only remedied with the rise in steam pressure and the introduction of geared cruising turbines during World War I. Downes had Thornycroft boilers and Duncan had Yarrow boilers. Both of these had Curtis steam turbines and triple-expansion cruising engines on both shafts.

Downes made 29.14 knots (53.97 km/h; 33.53 mph) on trials at 14,254 shp (10,629 kW). Normal fuel oil capacity was 312 tons.

== Ships in class ==
Ships of the Cassin destroyer class
Name	Hull no.	Shipyard	Laid down	Launched	Commissioned	Decommissioned	Fate
Cassin	DD-43	Bath Iron Works, Bath, Maine	1 May 1912	20 May 1913	9 August 1913	29 March 1922	USCG 1924–33, scrapped 1934
Cummings	DD-44	Bath Iron Works	21 May 1912	6 August 1913	19 September 1913	23 June 1922	USCG 1924–32, scrapped 1934
Downes	DD-45	New York Shipbuilding, Camden, New Jersey	27 June 1912	8 November 1913	11 February 1915	6 June 1922	USCG 1924–31, scrapped 1934
Duncan	DD-46	Fore River Shipbuilding, Quincy, Massachusetts	17 June 1912	5 April 1913	30 August 1913	1 August 1922	Scrapped 1935

== See also ==
- Aylwin-class destroyer

== Bibliography ==
- Bauer, K. Jack; Roberts, Stephen S. (1991). Register of Ships of the U.S. Navy, 1775–1990: Major Combatants. Westport, Connecticut: Greenwood Press. ISBN 0-313-26202-0.
- Friedman, Norman (2004). US Destroyers: An Illustrated Design History (Revised ed.). Annapolis: Naval Institute Press. ISBN 1-55750-442-3.
- Gardiner, Robert; Gray, Randal (1985). Conway's All the World's Fighting Ships 1906-1921. London: Conway Maritime Press. ISBN 0-85177-245-5.
- Jane's Fighting Ships of World War I. London: Random House Group, Ltd. 2001. ISBN 1-85170-378-0.
- Silverstone, Paul H. (1970). U.S. Warships of World War I. London: Ian Allan. ISBN 0-71100-095-6.
