= USS Wainwright (DD-62) =

Tucker-class destroyer

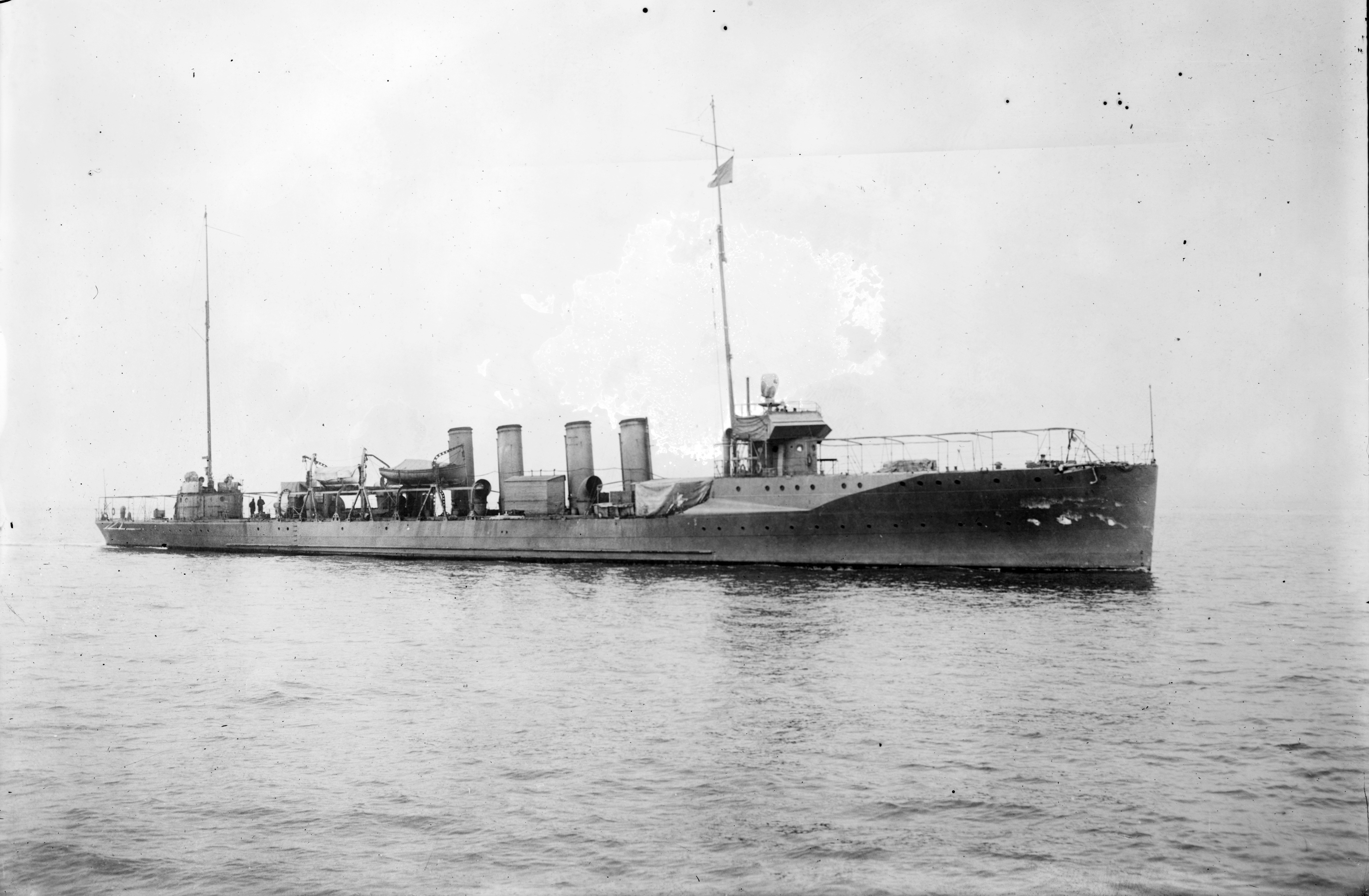
- USS Wainwright, c. 1916–1922

History

United States
- Name: USS Wainwright
- Namesake: Jonathan Wainwright; Jonathan Wainwright, Jr.; Richard Wainwright
- Ordered: 1913
- Builder: New York Shipbuilding; Camden, New Jersey
- Yard number: 151
- Laid down: 1 September 1914
- Launched: 12 June 1915
- Commissioned: 12 May 1916
- Decommissioned: 3 June 1922
- Stricken: 2 April 1926
- Identification: DD-62
- Fate: transferred to U.S. Coast Guard, 2 April 1926
- Acquired: returned from U.S. Coast Guard, 27 April 1934
- Reinstated: 27 April 1934
- Stricken: 5 July 1934
- Fate: Sold on 22 August 1934

United States
- Name: USCGC Wainwright
- Acquired: 2 April 1926
- Commissioned: 30 July 1926, New London, Connecticut
- Decommissioned: 29 March 1934
- Identification: CG-24
- Fate: returned to U.S. Navy, 27 April 1934

General characteristics
- Class & type: Tucker-class destroyer
- Displacement: 1,060 long tons (1,080 t); 1,205 long tons (1,224 t) fully loaded
- Length: 315 ft 3 in (96.09 m)
- Beam: 29 ft 9 in (9.07 m)
- Draft: 9 ft 4 in (2.84 m)
- Propulsion: 2 × screw propellers; 2 × Curtis geared steam turbines, 17,000 shp (13,000 kW); 4 × Yarrow boilers
- Speed: 30 knots (56 km/h)
- Complement: 99 officers and enlisted
- Armament: 4 × 4 in (102 mm)/50 gun; 8 × 21 inch (533 mm) torpedo tubes

USS Wainwright (Destroyer No. 62/DD-62) was a Tucker-class destroyer built for the United States Navy prior to the American entry into World War I. The ship was the first U.S. Navy vessel named in honor of U.S. Navy officers Jonathan Wainwright, his cousin, Commander Richard Wainwright, and his son, Jonathan Wainwright Jr..

Wainwright was laid down by the New York Shipbuilding of Camden, New Jersey, in September 1914 and launched in June of the following year. The ship was a little more than 315 feet (96 m) in length, just under 30 feet (9.1 m) abeam, and had a standard displacement of 1,090 long tons (1,110 t). She was armed with four 4-inch (10 cm) guns and had eight 21 inch (533 mm) torpedo tubes. Wainwright was powered by a pair of steam turbines that propelled her at up to 30 knots (56 km/h).

After her May 1916 commissioning, Wainwright sailed in the Atlantic and the Caribbean. After the United States entered World War I in April 1917, Wainwright was part of the first U.S. destroyer squadron sent overseas. Patrolling the Irish Sea out of Queenstown, Ireland, Wainwright made several unsuccessful attacks on U-boats, and rescued survivors of several ships sunk by the German craft.

Upon returning to the United States after the war, Wainwright resumed operations with the destroyers of the Atlantic Fleet until May 1922, when she was decommissioned. In April 1926, Wainwright was transferred to the United States Coast Guard to help enforce Prohibition as a part of the "Rum Patrol". She operated under the name USCGC Wainwright (CG-24) until April 1934, when she was returned to the Navy. She was sold for scrap in August 1934.

== Design and construction ==
Wainwright was authorized in 1913 as the sixth and final ship of the Tucker class which, like the related O'Brien class, was an improved version of the Cassin-class destroyers authorized in 1911. Construction of the vessel was awarded to New York Shipbuilding of Camden, New Jersey, which laid down her keel on 1 September 1914. Just over nine months later, on 12 June 1915, Wainwright was launched by sponsor Miss Evelyn Wainwright Turpin, a descendant of the ship's namesakes, Commodore Jonathan Wainwright (1821–1863), his cousin Richard Wainwright (1817–1862), and son Jonathan Wainwright Jr. (1849–1870), all U.S. Navy officers that died while serving. As built, Wainwright was 315 feet 3 inches (96.09 m) in length and 29 feet 9 inches (9.07 m) abeam and drew 9 feet 4 inches (2.84 m). The ship had a standard displacement of 1,060 long tons (1,080 t) and displaced 1,205 long tons (1,224 t) when fully loaded.

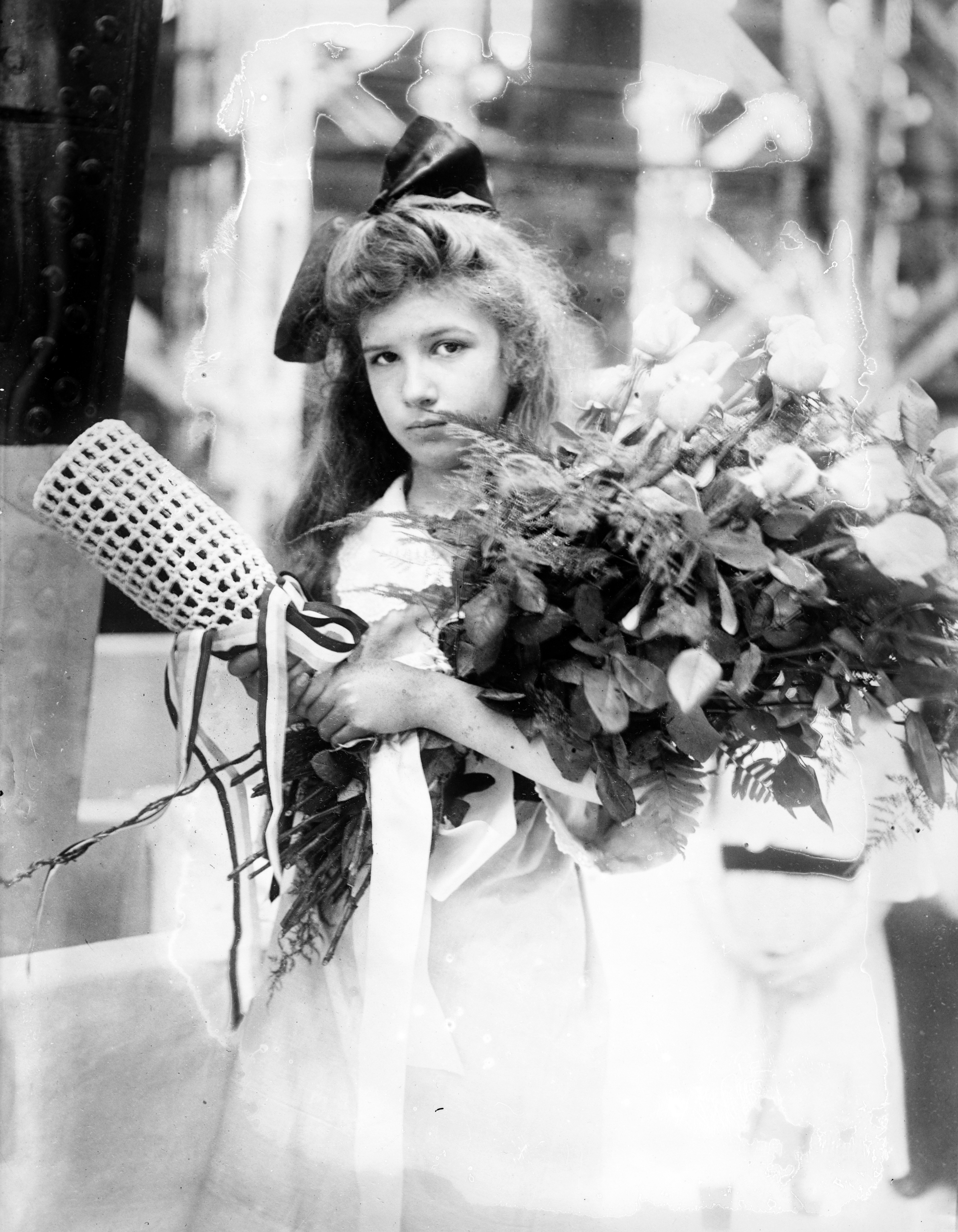
Evelyn Wainwright Turpin, Wainwright's sponsor at launch; Miss Turpin was the great-granddaughter of Commodore Jonathan Wainwright, one of the ship's namesakes

Wainwright had two Curtis steam turbines that drove her two screw propellers, and an additional steam turbine geared to one of the propeller shafts for cruising purposes. The power plant could generate 17,000 shaft horsepower (13,000 kW) and move the ship at speeds up to 30 knots (56 km/h).

Wainwright's main battery consisted of four 4 in (102 mm)/50 Mark 9 guns, (Note: The 50 denotes the length of the gun barrels; in this case, the gun is 50 calibers, meaning that the gun is 50 times as long as it is in diameter, 200 inches (5.1 m) in this case. The Mark number is the version of the gun; in this case, the ninth U.S. Navy design of the 4-inch/50 gun.) with each gun weighing in excess of 6,100 pounds (2,800 kg). The guns fired 33-pound (15 kg) armor-piercing projectiles at 2,900 feet per second (880 m/s). At an elevation of 20°, the guns had a range of 15,920 yards (14,560 m).

Wainwright was also equipped with eight 21-inch (533 mm) torpedo tubes. The General Board of the United States Navy had called for two anti-aircraft guns for the Tucker-class ships, as well as provisions for laying up to 36 floating mines. From sources, it is unclear if these recommendations were followed for Wainwright or any of the other ships of the class.

== Early career ==
USS Wainwright was commissioned into the United States Navy on 12 May 1916. After fitting out at Philadelphia, the destroyer rounded Cape May on 20 June and headed for Newport, Rhode Island, to load torpedoes before joining Division 8 of the Atlantic Fleet Destroyer Flotilla. Following exercises near Eastport, Maine, she remained on the New England coast until mid-September when she headed south for gunnery tests and training off the Virginia capes. Upon the completion of a fortnight's gun drills, the ship then returned to Buzzard's Bay, Massachusetts, on 2 October. Later that month, Wainwright operated out of Newport, practiced torpedo tactics near Vineyard Sound, and visited New York to pick up cargo for the flotilla's tender, Melville. She returned to Newport on the 18th and, eight days later, resumed torpedo practice near Vineyard Sound for the remainder of the month. She put into Boston, Massachusetts on 1 November for extensive repairs in the navy yard.

Refurbished, the destroyer got underway for the Caribbean on 8 January 1917. Steaming via Hampton Roads, Virginia, she reached Culebra Island, near Puerto Rico, on the 14th and conducted war games exercises with the Atlantic Fleet. In the course of those operations, she visited the Dominican Republic as well as Guantanamo Bay and Santiago in Cuba. Later that month, Wainwright carried Assistant Secretary of the Navy Franklin D. Roosevelt; Brigadier General George Barnett, the Commandant of the Marine Corps; and the Chairman of the Civil Service Commission from Santiago to Port-au-Prince, Haiti. Following that assignment, Wainwright conducted torpedo exercises, patrols, and power trials near Guantanamo Bay until the beginning of March.

She returned to Boston on 10 March for a short period in the Navy Yard. On 31 March, she departed Boston for Hampton Roads where she arrived on 2 April. The following morning, in response to the imminent threat of war with Germany, Wainwright began to search for submarines and to patrol Hampton Roads to protect the Fleet and naval bases. Two days later, other warships relieved her on patrol; and she anchored with the Fleet in the mouth of the York River. The next day, 6 April 1917, the United States entered World War I.

== World War I ==
By the spring of 1917, the unrestricted submarine warfare campaign—which Germany had launched at the beginning of February—had so succeeded that the entire Allied war effort was endangered. Strong reinforcements to the Allied antisubmarine forces were desperately needed to avert defeat and needed at once. In response to a request from the Royal Navy for the service of American antisubmarine warfare ships in European waters, the United States Navy began sending destroyers eastward across the Atlantic.

Wainwright again briefly patrolled Hampton Roads before heading for the New York Navy Yard on 14 April, and on to Boston, where she arrived two days later, to prepare for overseas duty. On 24 April, the destroyer departed Boston in company with Wadsworth, Porter, Davis, Conyngham, and McDougal, bound for the British Isles. This division—led by Commander Joseph K. Taussig—was the first American naval unit to be sent to Europe. The destroyers reached Queenstown on the southern coast of Ireland on 4 May and, after fueling, began patrolling the southern approaches to Liverpool and other British ports on the coast of the Irish Sea.

Wainwright reported her first scrape with a German submarine on 11 May. She sighted an abandoned lifeboat at about 08:00. After investigating the drifting boat for occupants and finding none, she sank the boat with gunfire. At about 08:15, a lookout reported that a torpedo had missed the destroyer some 150 yards (140 m) astern. Wainwright then fired several rounds from her 4-inch (102 mm) guns at what was thought to be a periscope. The supposed submarine disappeared soon thereafter; and, despite a thorough investigation of the area, the destroyer could turn up no more evidence of the presence of a U-boat.

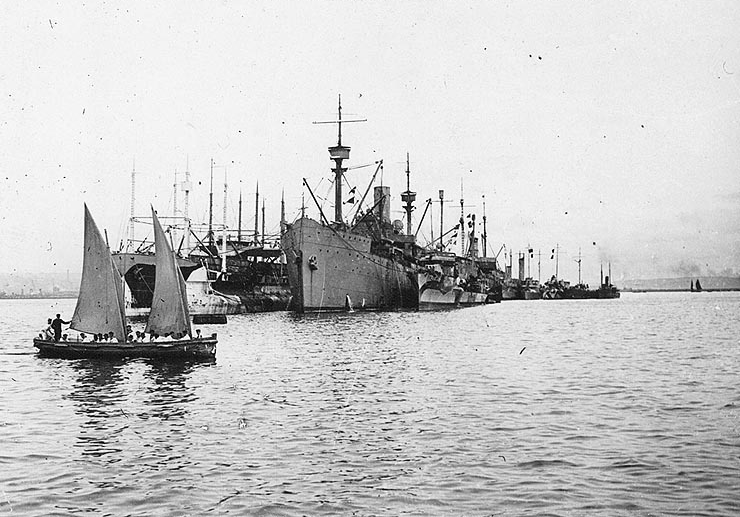
Wainwright (right) alongside destroyer tender Bridgeport at Brest in 1918

The summer of 1917 provided few opportunities for Wainwright to test her sub-killing techniques. On 4 July, a member of the destroyer's crew spotted a purported periscope and soon thereafter others claimed that a torpedo was reported to have passed the ship, 5 feet (1.5 m) astern. Wainwright depth-charged the last indicated position of the undersea raider but to no avail. On the morning of 20 August, after Rowan brought up some oil with one of her depth charges, Wainwright dropped a couple of depth charges as she passed through the faint slick. A few minutes later, she joined other ships in some sporadic gunfire but failed to prove that a submarine was in the area.

The fall, on the other hand, brought Wainwright increased activity. After spending the first two weeks of September in repairs at Birkenhead, near Liverpool, she departed the yard at Laird Basin at about 07:00 on the 14th to return to Queenstown. Three quarters of an hour into the afternoon watch, she received orders sending her to the scene of a submarine attack against an Allied merchantman some 15 nautical miles (28 km) south-southeast of Helvick Head, Ireland. Wainwright rang up full speed, made off for the reported location, and began a search for the U-boat in conjunction with a British dirigible and other surface units. Near the end of the second dog watch, she sighted the submarine's conning tower and bow about 6 nautical miles (11 km) off.

Wainwright charged to the attack, but the submarine submerged almost immediately. Upon reaching the spot where the submarine had been, the warship located an oil slick and began dropping depth charges which failed to achieve positive results. Approaching darkness and the necessity of escorting an Admiralty oiler forced Wainwright to break off her attack. After she shepherded the oiler to safety, she returned to the area of her attack and patrolled throughout the night, but the submarine had apparently retired from the neighborhood.

Four days later, while searching for a U-boat in the area of Conigbeg Rock, the destroyer received word that the Conigbeg Lightship had rescued survivors from a fishing vessel. Wainwright rendezvoused with the craft to interview the four seamen of the smack Our Bairns. They revealed that the U-boat—which turned out to be UC-48—was of the latest type Germany had in action. The destroyer relieved the lighthouse vessel of the four fishermen and continued the search until dusk, when she headed back to Queenstown to land the rescued men.

For a month, she carried on conducting routine patrols. Action finally came on the morning of 18 October, when Wainwright again received orders to Helvick Head to hunt for an enemy submarine. She arrived at the designated location at about 11:15 and searched for more than two hours for clues as to the U-boat's location. Then, at 13:58, she sighted a submarine's conning tower about 1,500 yards (1,400 m) off her starboard bow. The enemy appeared to be maneuvering into position for a torpedo attack but submerged the moment Wainwright charged to the attack. When the destroyer reached the estimated location of the U-boat, she dropped a depth charge and then a buoy to mark the spot. The warship followed that maneuver with a systematic, circular search out to a radius of 20 nautical miles (37 km). Having found nothing by 04:00 the following morning, she gave up and shaped a course for Queenstown.

The ensuing six months brought no new encounters with U-boats. She scouted areas where submarines had been reported but neither sighted nor engaged the enemy. On one occasion, she collided with a merchantman, Chicago City, and had to enter the drydock at Spencer Jetty that same day, 24 November 1917, for repairs.

While steaming generally south on 29 April 1918, she sighted a sail bearing almost due west whose hull was down below the horizon. By the time the destroyer had swung around to an intercepting course, the sail had disappeared. While the destroyer steamed toward the estimated position of the sail, she searched for evidence of a submarine. After covering 10 nautical miles (19 km) westward, she came upon an area marked by a number of small oil slicks. Wainwright chose the most promising of the slicks and dropped four depth charges. She then commenced another fruitless search which ended at midnight when she received orders to return to Queenstown.

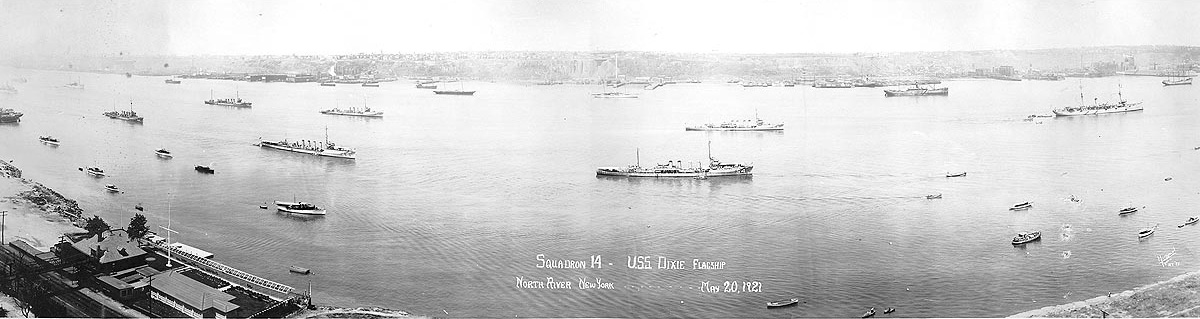
Wainwright and the rest of Destroyer Squadron 14 at New York on 20 May 1921

Wainwright continued to operate out of Queenstown until June 1918 when she was reassigned to United States naval forces in France. On the 8th, she reported for duty at Brest, the French port from which she conducted her patrols for the remainder of the war. Those patrols brought no further encounters with the enemy. Only two events of note occurred between June and November 1918. On the night of 19/20 October, she sighted what appeared to be a submarine running on the surface. However, upon closer inspection, the object proved to be a derelict carrying the crew of the 77-ton Portuguese schooner Aida, which had been captured by German submarine U-43 and sunk with explosive charges. Wainwright took on the survivors and saw them safely into port. Later, during the evening of 1 November, heavy winds at Brest caused the destroyer to drag anchor: and she struck the breakwater. After Jarvis had failed to pull her loose, the tug Concord took over and finally managed to refloat the warship at 19:20 and towed her into Brest.

Hostilities ended on 11 November 1918, and Wainwright returned home early in 1919 to resume duty with the Atlantic Fleet destroyers. She operated along the east coast and in the Caribbean until 19 May 1922 when she was decommissioned at Philadelphia, Pennsylvania. The destroyer remained in reserve until the spring of 1926.

== Coast Guard career ==
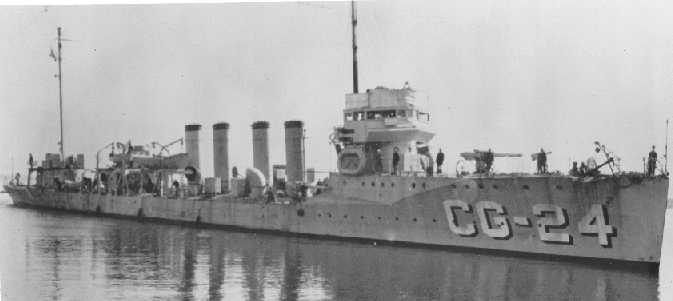
Wainwright in Coast Guard service, c. 1924–33

On 17 January 1920, Prohibition was instituted by law in the United States. Soon, the smuggling of alcoholic beverages along the coastlines of the United States became widespread and blatant. The Treasury Department eventually determined that the United States Coast Guard simply did not have the ships to constitute a successful patrol. To cope with the problem, President Calvin Coolidge in 1924 authorized the transfer from the Navy to the Coast Guard of twenty old destroyers that were in reserve and out of commission. Wainwright was activated and acquired by the Coast Guard on 2 April 1926, as part of a second group of five to augment the original twenty.

Wainwright moved to Boston on 22 May and remained there until 27 July when she got underway for the Connecticut coast. She reached New London, two days later; and, on the 30th, she was commissioned by the Coast Guard. The warship retained her name while serving with the Coast Guard's "Rum Patrol" to suppress the illegal importation of alcoholic beverages. She served at New London from the summer of 1926 until 1929. On 4 January 1929, she headed south to Charleston, South Carolina, whence she conducted gunnery practice until 4 February when she returned north to Boston. In January 1930, she headed south again for gunnery practice but this time at St. Petersburg, Florida. During each of the two succeeding years—in January 1931 and late in March 1932—she returned to St. Petersburg for a month of target practice and afterward resumed her duties along the New England coast.

In May 1933, her permanent duty station was changed to New York, and she reported there at the end of the first week in June. After a summer of normal operations, the warship began target practice at Hampton Roads, on 7 September.

== U.S. Navy duty in Cuba ==
That duty, however, was interrupted on the 9th by orders to report for duty with the Navy in the area of the Florida Strait during the series of revolts in Cuba which finally resulted in the beginning of Fulgencio Batista's 25-year rule. On 6 November, Wainwright was released from duty with the Navy and was ordered back to New York.

== Return to Coast Guard duty ==
Wainwright arrived three days later and resumed duties with the Coast Guard until March 1934. On the 14th, she departed the station at Stapleton, New York, and arrived in Philadelphia the following day. She was decommissioned by the Coast Guard on 29 March.

== Return to Navy, decommissioning, and disposal ==
On 27 April, the Commandant, 4th Naval District, took possession of Wainwright for the Navy. Her name was reinstated on the Navy list briefly but was struck once again on 5 July 1934. On 22 August, she was sold to Michael Flynn, Inc., of Brooklyn, New York, for scrapping.

== Bibliography ==
- Gardiner, Robert; Gray, Randal, eds. (1985). Conway's All the World's Fighting Ships 1906–1921. Annapolis, Maryland: Naval Institute Press. ISBN 978-0-87021-907-8. OCLC 12119866.
