= USS Tucker (DD-57) =

Lead ship of Tucker-class

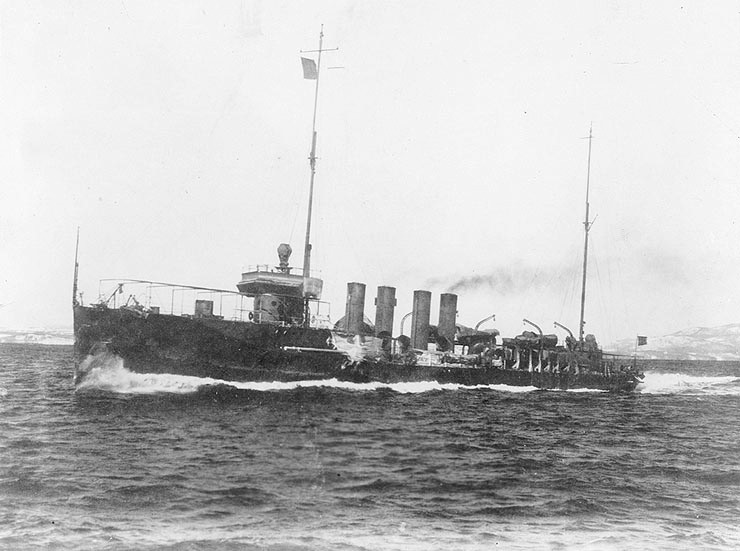
- USS Tucker (DD-57), underway while running trials, circa 19 March 1916. Note the ice accumulated amidships.

History

United States
- Name: Tucker
- Namesake: Commodore Samuel Tucker
- Ordered: 1913
- Builder: Fore River Shipbuilding Company; Quincy, Massachusetts
- Cost: $873,155.90 (hull and machinery)
- Yard number: 226
- Laid down: 9 November 1914
- Launched: 4 May 1915
- Sponsored by: Mrs. William Garty
- Commissioned: 11 April 1916
- Decommissioned: 16 May 1921
- Stricken: 24 October 1936
- Identification: Hull symbol:DD-57; Code letters:NKV
- Fate: transferred to U.S. Coast Guard, 25 March 1926, returned 1933, sold on 10 December 1936 and scrapped.

United States
- Name: Tucker
- Acquired: 25 March 1926
- Commissioned: 29 September 1926
- Decommissioned: 5 June 1933
- Identification: Hull symbol:CG-23
- Fate: returned to U.S. Navy, 30 June 1933

General characteristics
- Class & type: Tucker-class destroyer
- Displacement: 1,090 long tons (1,110 t); 1,205 long tons (1,224 t) fully loaded
- Length: 315 ft 3 in (96.09 m)
- Beam: 29 ft 9 in (9.07 m)
- Draft: 9 ft 4 1/2 in (2.858 m) (mean)
- Installed power: 4 × Yarrow boilers; 17,000 shp (13,000 kW)
- Propulsion: 2 × Curtis geared steam turbines; 2 × screw propellers
- Speed: 29.5 knots (54.6 km/h)
- Complement: 5 officers 96 enlisted
- Armament: 4 × 4 in (100 mm)/50 caliber guns; 8 × 21 inch (533 mm) torpedo tubes (4 × 2)

USS Tucker (Destroyer No. 57/DD-57) was the lead ship of her class of destroyers built for the United States Navy prior to the American entry into World War I. The ship was the first U.S. Navy vessel named for Samuel Tucker.

Tucker was laid down by the Fore River Shipbuilding Company of Quincy, Massachusetts, in November 1914 and launched in May 1915. The ship was a little more than 315 feet (96 m) in length, nearly 30 feet (9.1 m) abeam, and had a standard displacement of 1,090 long tons (1,110 t). She was armed with four 4 in (100 mm)/50 caliber guns and had eight 21 inch (533 mm) torpedo tubes. Tucker was powered by a pair of steam turbines that propelled her at up to 29.5 knots (54.6 km/h).

After her April 1916 commissioning, Tucker sailed in the Atlantic and the Caribbean. After the United States entered World War I in April 1917, Tucker was part of the second U.S. destroyer squadron sent overseas. Patrolling the Irish Sea out of Queenstown, Ireland, Tucker made several rescues of passengers and crew from ships sunk by U-boats. For her part in rescuing crewmen from the Dupetit-Thouars in August 1918, Tucker received a commendation from the Préfet Maritime. In June, Tucker was transferred to Brest, France, and spent the remainder of the war there.

Upon returning to the United States near the end of 1918, Tucker underwent repairs at the Boston Navy Yard. After a New England recruiting tour through October 1919, she was placed in reduced commission and then decommissioned in May 1921. In March 1926, Tucker was transferred to the United States Coast Guard to help enforce Prohibition as a part of the "Rum Patrol". She operated under the name USCGC Tucker (CG-23) until 1933; during her Coast Guard service, she was the first American ship to arrive at the crash site of Navy airship Akron. After her transfer back to the Navy later in 1933, the ship was renamed DD-57 to free the name Tucker for another destroyer. She was sold for scrap and hulked in December 1936.

== Design and construction ==
Tucker was authorized in 1913 as the lead ship of her class which, like the related O'Brien class, was an improved version of the Cassin-class destroyers authorized in 1911. Construction of the vessel was awarded to Fore River Shipbuilding Company of Quincy, Massachusetts, which laid down her keel on 9 November 1914. Six months later, on 4 May 1915, Tucker was launched by sponsor Mrs. William Garty, the great-great-granddaughter of the ship's namesake, Samuel Tucker (1747–1833), a Continental Navy officer. As built, Tucker was 315 feet 3 inches (96.09 m) in length and 29 feet 9 inches (9.07 m) abeam and drew 9 feet 4 inches (2.84 m). The ship had a standard displacement of 1,090 long tons (1,110 t) and displaced 1,205 long tons (1,224 t) when fully loaded.

Tucker had two Curtis steam turbines that drove her two screw propellers, and an additional steam turbine geared to one of the propeller shafts for cruising purposes. The power plant could generate 17,000 shaft horsepower (13,000 kW) and move the ship at speeds of up to 29.5 knots (54.6 km/h), though Tucker reached a top speed of 30.03 knots (55.62 km/h) during her trials.

Tucker's main battery consisted of four 4-inch (100 mm)/50 Mark 9 guns, (Note: The 50 denotes the length of the gun barrels; in this case, the gun is 50 calibers, meaning that the gun is 50 times as long as it is in diameter, 200 inches (5.1 m) in this case. The Mark number is the version of the gun; in this case, the ninth U.S. Navy design of the 4-inch/50 gun.) with each gun weighing in excess of 6,100 pounds (2,800 kg). The guns fired 33-pound (15 kg) armor-piercing projectiles at 2,900 feet per second (880 m/s). At an elevation of 20°, the guns had a range of 15,920 yards (14,560 m).

Tucker was also equipped with eight 21-inch (533 mm) torpedo tubes. The General Board of the United States Navy had called for two anti-aircraft guns for the Tucker-class ships, as well as provisions for laying up to 36 floating mines. From sources, it is unclear if these recommendations were followed for Tucker or any of the other ships of the class.

== Early career ==
USS Tucker was commissioned into the United States Navy on 11 April 1916 under the temporary command of Lieutenant, junior grade, Frank Slingluff, Jr. Following her commissioning, Tucker commenced trials off the east coast before reporting to Division 8, Destroyer Force, United States Atlantic Fleet. With World War I ongoing in Europe, Tucker and units of the Fleet conducted exercises and maneuvers in southern and Cuban waters into the spring of 1917.

Steaming independently in the West Indies, she received word of the United States' declaration of war on 6 April 1917. Tucker joined the fleet at its anchorage in the York River before being ordered to proceed to the Boston Navy Yard, for fitting-out for war.

== World War I ==
The immediate and pressing need for escort ships led to the deployment of American destroyers to Queenstown, Ireland; Tucker, Rowan, Cassin, Ericsson, Winslow, and Jacob Jones set out from Boston on 7 May 1917 as the second contingent of United States ships designated to operate in conjunction with British surface forces patrolling off the Irish coast. Arriving ten days later, Tucker and her sister ships soon commenced wartime operations. On 12 June, she rescued 47 survivors from the stricken merchantman SS Poluxena; on 1 August, she saved 39 men from SS Karina, which had been torpedoed by German submarine UC-75. For the remainder of 1917 and into the late spring of 1918, Tucker operated out of Queenstown, hunting German submarines, escorting and convoying ships through the submarine-infested war zones, and providing assistance to ships in distress.

In June 1918, Tucker joined the escorts working out of Brest, France. On 1 August, while steaming out to meet an inbound convoy, she received word that the group's escort, the French cruiser French cruiser Dupetit-Thouars|, had been torpedoed and sunk by the German submarine SM U-62. The American destroyer soon arrived on the scene and helped to save the survivors of the stricken French warship from the waters of the Bay of Biscay. Tucker's efforts, and those of the five other American destroyers who were also present, were rewarded by a commendation from the Préfet Maritime, on behalf of the French Ministry of Marine.

Tucker obtained her share of the submarine hunting the day after assisting in the rescue of Dupetit-Thuoars' crew, on 8 August. Sighting a U-boat, Tucker sped to the attack, dropping depth bombs on the vessel. The British Admiralty gave credit to Tucker for a "possibly sunk" as a result of the attack. And the Commander of US Naval Forces in France authorized its commanding officer to paint a white star on the forward smokestack « to denote the fact that the USS Tucker has successfully engaged and put out of action an enemy submarine on 9 August 1918. » As antisubmarine warfare was in its infancy, however, attempts to verify the "kill" proved to be inconclusive. On 11 November 1918, the armistice was signed, and hostilities ceased along the war-torn Western Front.

== Post-war ==
While American forces withdrew from Europe and headed home to the United States, Tucker carried passengers and mail between French and British ports. Departing from Brest for the last time on 16 December 1918, she headed for Boston, where she entered the navy yard for extended repairs.

In July 1919, she departed Boston and cruised along the coastlines of Massachusetts and Maine, engaged in recruiting duty. In October 1919, she was placed in reserve in Philadelphia, Pennsylvania, where she remained until placed out of commission on 16 May 1921. On 17 July 1920, Tucker was designated DD-57 under the Navy's new hull classification system.

== United States Coast Guard career ==
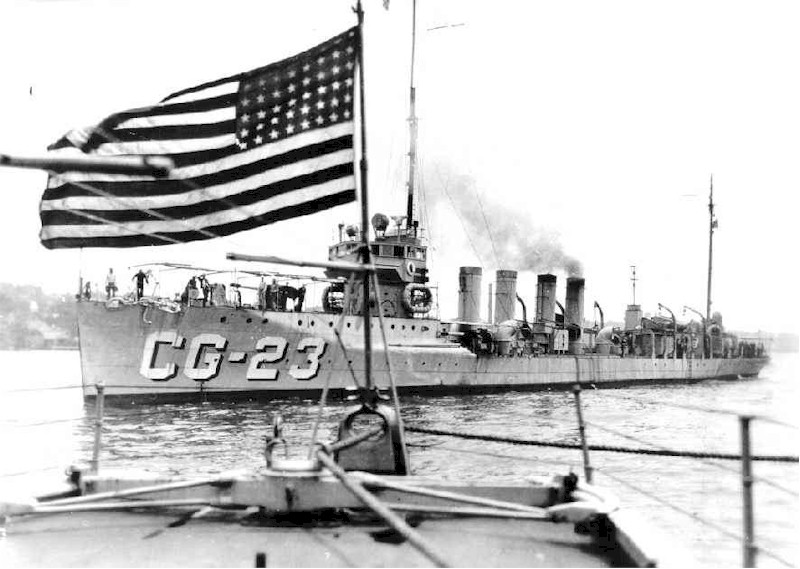
Tucker on the "Rum Patrol" in the service of the United States Coast Guard

On 17 January 1920, Prohibition was instituted by law in the United States. Soon, the smuggling of alcoholic beverages along the coastlines of the United States became widespread and blatant. The Treasury Department eventually determined that the United States Coast Guard simply did not have the ships to constitute a successful patrol. To cope with the problem, President Calvin Coolidge in 1924 authorized the transfer from the Navy to the Coast Guard of twenty old destroyers that were in reserve and out of commission. Tucker was activated and acquired by the Coast Guard on 25 March 1926, as part of a second group of five to augment the original twenty.

Designated CG-23, Tucker was commissioned on 29 September, and joined the "Rum Patrol" to aid in the attempt to enforce prohibition laws. She served as the flagship of Division 4 of the Destroyer Force through October 1927, when she was transferred to Division 1. On 4 April 1933, the greatest disaster which aeronautics had experienced up to that time occurred off the New Jersey coast. The Navy airship Akron crashed in a storm killing 73 men, including Rear Admiral William A. Moffett, Chief of the Bureau of Aeronautics. Tucker received word of the crash and sped to the scene. Upon arrival, she found that the German motorship Phoebus had rescued four men from the sea—one of whom died shortly after being rescued. The survivors were transferred to Tucker and were disembarked at the New York Navy Yard.

After the United States Congress proposed the Twenty-first Amendment to end prohibition in February 1933, plans were made for Tucker to be returned to the Navy. On 26 May, Tucker arrived at the Philadelphia Navy Yard, and was decommissioned ten days later, on 5 June. Tucker was transferred back to the Navy on 30 June. On 1 November, Tucker was renamed DD-57 in order to free the name Tucker for a new destroyer of the same name. For a time, DD-57 served as a Sea Scout training ship at Sandy Hook, New Jersey. She was struck from the Naval Vessel Register on 24 October 1936. DD-57 was sold on 10 December and reduced to a hulk on 23 December.

== Bibliography ==
- Gardiner, Robert; Gray, Randal, eds. (1985). Conway's All the World's Fighting Ships 1906–1921. Annapolis, Maryland: Naval Institute Press. ISBN 978-0-87021-907-8. OCLC 12119866.
- Naval History & Heritage Command. "Tucker". Dictionary of American Naval Fighting Ships. Navy Department, Naval History and Heritage Command.
