= Tucker-class destroyer =

Destroyer class of the US Navy

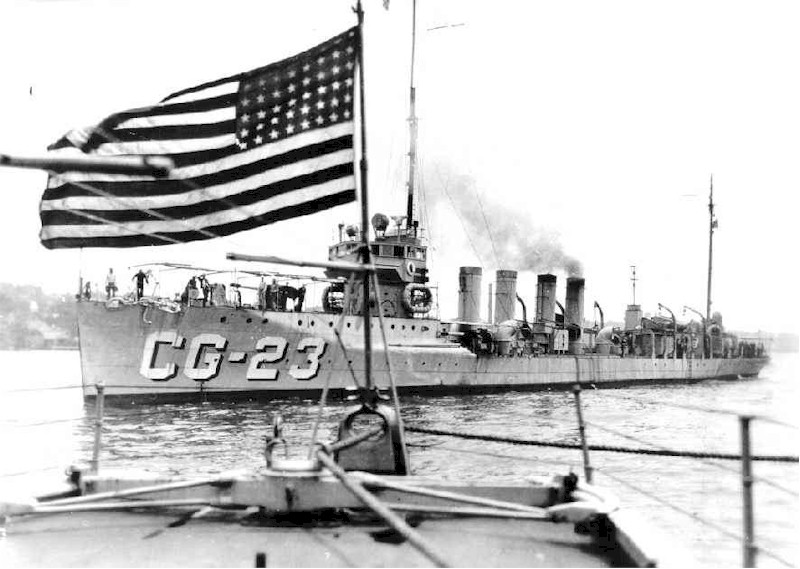
- Lead ship Tucker in United States Coast Guard service, c. 1926–1933

Class overview
- Name: Tucker-class destroyer
- Builders: Bath Iron Works (1); Fore River Shipbuilding Company (1); New York Shipbuilding Corporation (2); William Cramp & Sons (2)
- Operators: United States Navy; United States Coast Guard
- Preceded by: O'Brien class
- Succeeded by: Sampson class
- Built: 1914–1916
- In commission: U.S. Navy: 1916–1922; U.S. Coast Guard: 1924–1934
- Planned: 6
- Completed: 6
- Lost: 1
- Retired: 5
- Scrapped: 5

General characteristics
- Type: Destroyer
- Displacement: 1,090 long tons (1,110 t) [DD-61, -62: 1150 long tons; DD-60: 1060 long tons] (normal); 1,205 long tons (1,224 t) (full)
- Length: 315 ft 3 in (96.09 m) (oa)
- Beam: 30 ft 6 in (9.30 m) [DD-57, -60, -62: 29 ft 11 in]
- Draft: 9 ft 4 in (2.84 m) [DD-60: 9 ft 2 in; DD-61: 9 ft 8 in] (normal); 10 ft 5 in (3.18 m) (max)
- Propulsion: 4 Yarrow boilers; 2 × direct drive steam turbines, 1 × geared cruising turbine [DD-60: 2 × geared steam turbines]; 2 × shafts; 17,000 shp (13,000 kW) [DD-58, -59: 18,000 shp; DD-60: 17,500 shp]
- Speed: 29.5 knots (54.6 km/h)
- Endurance: 2,500 nautical miles at 20 knots (4,600 km at 37 km/h)
- Complement: 99
- Armament: 4 × 4 in (102 mm)/50 caliber guns; 8 × 21 inch (533 mm) torpedo tubes (4 × 2), 8 torpedoes

The Tucker class of destroyers was a ship class of six ships designed by and built for the United States Navy shortly before the United States entered World War I. The Tucker class was the fourth of five classes of destroyers that were known as the "thousand tonners", because they were the first U.S. destroyers over 1,000 long tons (1,016 t) displacement.

The design of what became the Tucker class was the result of compromises between the General Board of the United States Navy and the U.S. Navy's Bureau of Construction and Repair. The General Board, tasked with creating an integrated battle fleet, wanted a larger ship that could serve in a scouting role and proposed a ship larger than the unique British destroyer HMS Swift of 1907, and more than twice the displacement of any previous U.S. destroyer. Input from Construction and Repair resulted in a design that was an incremental development of the O'Brien class, which itself was similar to the first of the thousand tonners, the Cassin class (which displaced about a third more than the preceding Paulding class).

The ships were built by four private American shipyards—Bath Iron Works, Fore River Shipbuilding Company, New York Shipbuilding Corporation, and William Cramp & Sons—and were laid down between February and November 1914; launched between April and July 1915; and commissioned into the U.S. Navy between July 1915 and May 1916. The ships had a median displacement of 1,060 long tons (1,080 t), were just over 315 feet (96 m) in length, and had a beam of about 30 feet (9.1 m). Most of the ships had two direct-drive steam turbines and a single geared cruising turbine; Wadsworth was equipped with two geared steam turbines only and, as the first U.S. destroyer so equipped, greatly influenced later U.S. Navy destroyer designs. All of the ships were designed for a maximum speed of 29.5 knots (54.6 km/h) and a range of 2,500 nautical miles (4,600 km) at more economical speeds. As built, they were armed with four 4-inch (10 cm) guns and had four twin 21 inch (533 mm) torpedo tubes with a load of eight torpedoes, but all were later equipped with depth charges.

All six ships operated in the Atlantic or Caribbean until the U.S. entrance into World War I in April 1917, when all six were sent overseas to Queenstown, Ireland, for convoy escort duties. Several of the ships rescued passengers and crew from ships sunk by U-boats, and several had encounters with U-boats themselves; Jacob Jones was torpedoed and sunk by U-58 in December 1917. All five surviving members of the class had returned to the United States by early 1919 and been decommissioned by June 1922. Between 1924 and 1926, four of the five (all but Wadsworth) were commissioned into the United States Coast Guard to help enforce Prohibition as a part of the "Rum Patrol". They were returned to U.S. Navy custody between 1934 and 1936, and had all been sold for scrapping by 1936.

== Background ==
In September 1912, the General Board of the United States Navy asked the Navy's Bureau of Construction and Repair (C&R) to develop plans for the next class of destroyers. The General Board asked for a design with four 4-inch (102 mm) guns, six twin 21-inch (533 mm) torpedo tubes, and twenty floating mines, that could travel at up to 35 knots (65 km/h) with steaming radius of 2,500 nautical miles at 20 knots (4,600 km at 37 km/h). C&R came back with a design for a 385-foot (117 m) long, 2,160-long-ton (2,190 t) displacement, triple-screw "super-destroyer" requiring 40,000 shaft horsepower (30,000 kW) to make the design speed of 35 knots (65 km/h). The C&R design was similar to, but larger than the unique British destroyer HMS Swift of 1907, and more than twice the displacement of the largest U.S. destroyers. (Note: The Cassin-class destroyers then under construction had a displacement of 1,010 long tons (1,030 t).)

The General Board, whose main concern was the integrated operation of the United States battle fleet, pushed for the design to provide more scouting capabilities for fleet operations. But the high cost of the design—$1,900,000 for hull and machinery vs. $790,000 for the O'Brien-class ships—and the lack of operating experience with the Cassin class—the first of the "thousand tonners" (destroyers exceeding 1,000 long tons (1,020 t) displacement) which were just beginning to be launched—caused C&R to resist the much larger design. The Chief Constructor of the Navy, the head of C&R, pointed out that the British had not repeated the Swift design in the five years since her introduction, and noted that "a destroyer that gets too large loses many of the desirable features of the type".

In November 1912, the General Board offered several alternatives to reduce the size of the destroyer, and was convinced by C&R that the most practical solution was a design that shared much with the O'Brien class: matching that class' main battery and torpedo load but with a design speed of 29.5 knots (54.6 km/h) and the desired 2,500-nautical-mile (4,600 km) steaming radius. The General Board also specified that the ships be equipped with "two aeroplane guns, if they can be developed and installed", have provisions for laying thirty-six mines, and a strengthened bow for ramming. The C&R design for the Tucker class, DD-57 through DD-62, (Note: Although the United States Navy's hull classification system in which destroyers were assigned the hull code of DD was not adopted until July 1920, most sources retroactively apply the numbering system. So, for example, the lead ship of the class is referred to in sources as Tucker (DD-57) rather than as Tucker (Destroyer No. 57), even though the latter name is the one she was known by throughout most of her U.S. Navy career. Similarly, because Jacob Jones was sunk in 1917, she was never known by DD-61 while afloat, but is referred to by that hull code in sources.) was approved by the Secretary of the Navy in December 1912, and authorized by Congress in 1913.

== Design ==
As built, the Tucker-class ships were 315 feet 3 inches (96.09 m) in length (overall), were between 29 feet 9 inches (9.07 m) and 30 feet 6 inches (9.30 m) abeam, and had a median draft of 9 feet 4 inches (2.84 m). The hull shape featured the distinctive high forecastle typical of U.S. destroyer classes since the 1908–09 Smith class, the first destroyers designed to be truly ocean-going vessels. The ships displaced between 1,060 and 1,150 long tons (1,080 and 1,170 t) with a median of 1,060 long tons (1,080 t).

The ships were equipped with two propeller shafts and two Curtis steam turbines fed by four Yarrow boilers, providing a minimum of 17,000 shaft horsepower (13,000 kW) to achieve the design speed of 29.5 knots (54.6 km/h). For all of the ships except Wadsworth, the pair of main turbines was supplemented with a cruising turbine geared to one of the shafts. Wadsworth had no cruising turbines, but instead had her twin turbines geared directly to the propeller shafts—the first American destroyer so outfitted. She served as a testbed, and had a considerable effect on U.S. destroyer design after her trials in July 1915.

The main battery of the Tucker class consisted of four 4-inch (100 mm)/50 Mark 9 guns, (Note: The 50 denotes the length of the gun barrels; in this case, the gun is 50 calibers, meaning that the gun is 50 times as long as it is in diameter, 200 inches (5.1 m) in this case. The Mark number is the version of the gun; in this case, the ninth U.S. Navy design of the 4-inch/50 gun.) with each gun weighing in excess of 6,100 pounds (2,800 kg). The guns fired 33-pound (15 kg) armor-piercing projectiles at 2,900 feet per second (880 m/s). At an elevation of 20°, the guns had a range of 15,920 yards (14,560 m).

The Tucker class was also equipped with four twin 21-inch (533 mm) torpedo tubes, for a total load of eight Mark 8 torpedoes. Although the General Board had called for two anti-aircraft guns for the Tucker class, they were not originally outfitted with the weapons; the Sampson class was the first American destroyer class so armed. Likewise, there is no record of any of the Tucker ships being outfitted with mine-laying apparatus. During World War I, most American destroyers were used in anti-submarine warfare roles, and were equipped with depth charges and delivery systems, such as Y-guns and depth charge racks. Tucker-class ships were equipped with depth charges during the war, but no specific mentions of the types of depth charges used or delivery system are recorded in available sources.

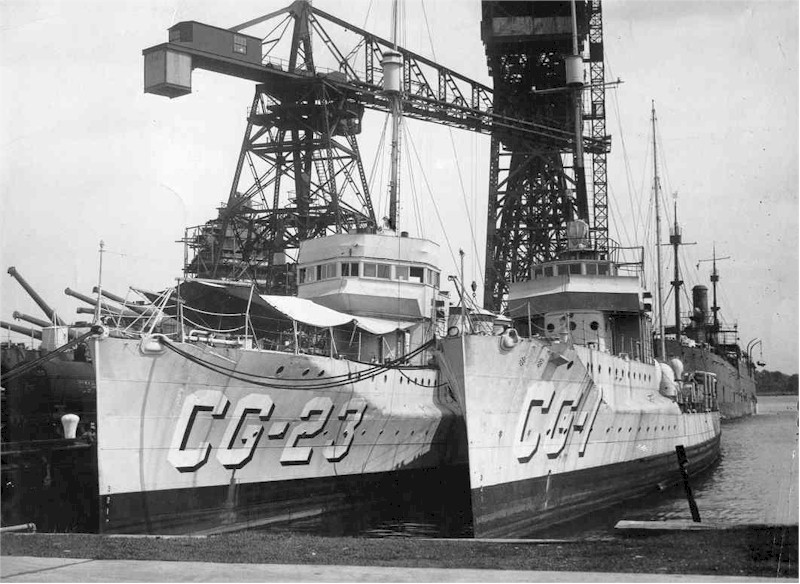
Tucker (left) and Cassin, the lead ships of their respective classes, show the design similarities between the Cassin and Tucker classes.

=== Comparisons with other "thousand tonners" ===
The "thousand tonners" were the 26 United States Navy destroyers of five classes—Cassin, Aylwin, O'Brien, Tucker, and Sampson—so named because they were the first U.S. Navy destroyers to have displacements greater than 1,000 long tons. (Note: The Aylwin class is considered a part of the Cassin class by Conway's All the World's Fighting Ships 1906–1921 (p. 122), but is classed separately by the United States Navy. See, for example, Naval History & Heritage Command. "Aylwin". Dictionary of American Naval Fighting Ships. Navy Department, Naval History and Heritage Command.) The Cassin class, the first of the thousand tonners, displaced about a third more than the preceding Paulding class. The introduction of the thousand tonners led to the Pauldings and other older, smaller displacement destroyers of previous classes to be dismissively called "flivvers", a nickname also commonly applied to the Ford Model T. (Note: According to Cashman (p. 278), a flivver—a portmanteau of "for the liver"—was any small, inexpensive automobile that shook the liver while in motion.)

The Tucker class was the fourth of the five classes of "thousand tonners". The earlier Cassin- (DD-43 to DD-46), Aylwin- (DD-47 to DD-50) and O'Brien-class (DD-51 to DD-56) ships were about 10 feet (3.0 m) shorter than the Tucker ships and had a lower displacement, between 40 and 80 long tons (41 and 81 t) less than the median displacement of the Tuckers; the later Sampson-class (DD-63 to DD-68) ships were the same length and displaced 10 long tons (10 t) more. All five classes were armed with four 4-inch (102 mm) guns, but the torpedo size and complement varied. All were equipped with four twin torpedo tubes loaded with eight torpedoes except for the Sampsons (which had four triple tubes carrying twelve torpedoes), but the Cassin and Aylwin classes were armed with 18-inch (457 mm) torpedoes; the rest with 21-inch (533 mm) torpedoes. The Sampsons were the only group originally equipped with anti-aircraft guns, a pair of 1-pounder (0.45 kg) guns with a caliber of 37 mm (1.46 in).

== Construction ==
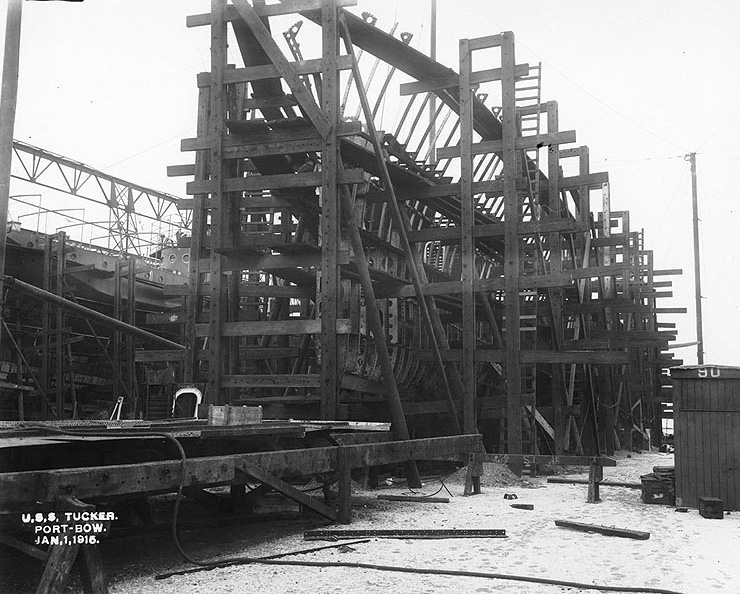
Tucker under construction at the Fore River Shipbuilding Company on 1 January 1915.

The construction of the six Tucker-class ships was allocated to four U.S. shipbuilders. The Fore River Shipbuilding Company and Bath Iron Works built one ship each, while William Cramp and New York Shipbuilding each constructed a pair of Tucker destroyers. The keels for all six ships were laid down between February and November 1914, with Wadsworth being the first and Tucker the last. All were launched between April and July 1915, with Wadsworth again being the first and Porter being the last. Wadsworth was commissioned in July 1915, three months after her launch; the rest were commissioned between January and May 1916, with Wainwright the final ship to enter service.

== Ships in class ==
All six members of the class served in the Atlantic throughout their U.S. Navy careers, and all were sent overseas to Queenstown, Ireland, for convoy escort and anti-submarine duties after the United States entered World War I in April 1917. Conyngham, Porter, Wadsworth, and Wainwright were in the first group of six American destroyers, arriving at Queenstown on 4 May; Tucker and Jacob Jones followed as part of the second group, which arrived thirteen days later. Several of the ships had encounters with U-boats during the war: Conyngham's commander was commended for what was thought a probable "kill" of one U-boat; Jacob Jones was sunk by U-53 in December 1917. All surviving ships of the class had returned to the United States by early 1919 and served in various roles over the next two years. Tucker was decommissioned in May 1921, followed by Wainwright in May 1922, and the remaining three in June 1922.

Between 1924 and 1926, four of the five ships—Conyngham and Porter in 1924, Tucker and Wainwright in 1926—were reactivated for service with the United States Coast Guard's "Rum Patrol". All were returned to the U.S. Navy in 1933 with the exception of Tucker, which followed in 1934. Conyngham, Porter, and Wainwright were sold for scrapping in 1934; the other two in 1936.

=== USS Tucker (DD-57) ===
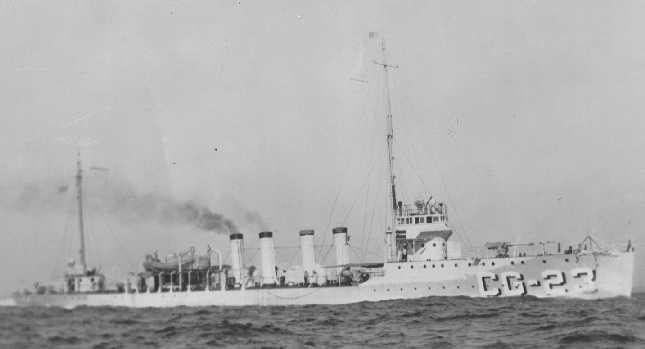
Tucker in United States Coast Guard service, c. 1926–1933

USS Tucker (DD-57), the lead ship of the class, was laid down by the Fore River Shipbuilding Company of Quincy, Massachusetts, in November 1914 and launched in May 1915. She was the first U.S. Navy vessel named for Samuel Tucker.

After her April 1916 commissioning, Tucker sailed off the east coast and in the Caribbean. After the United States entered World War I in April 1917, Tucker was part of the second U.S. destroyer squadron sent overseas. Patrolling the Irish Sea out of Queenstown, Ireland, Tucker made several rescues of passengers and crew from ships sunk by U-boats. For her part in rescuing crewmen from the Dupetit-Thouars in August 1918, Tucker received a commendation from the Préfet Maritime. ». « Tucker » hunted and sank the U-boat involved the day after the attack, cheered on by the sailors it had rescued, who were still on board. The commanding officer, Douglas W. Fuller, was made a chevalier of the Legion d'Honneur. « 'Tucker was transferred to Brest, France, and spent the remainder of the war there.

Upon returning to the United States near the end of 1918, Tucker underwent repairs at the Boston Navy Yard. After a New England recruiting tour through October 1919, she was placed in reduced commission and then decommissioned in May 1921. In March 1926, Tucker was transferred to the United States Coast Guard to help enforce Prohibition as a part of the "Rum Patrol". She operated under the name USCGC Tucker (CG-23) until 1933; during her Coast Guard service, she was the first American ship to arrive at the crash site of Navy airship Akron. After her transfer back to the Navy later in 1933, the ship was renamed DD-57 to free the name Tucker for another destroyer. She was sold for scrap and hulked in December 1936.

=== USS Conyngham (DD-58) ===
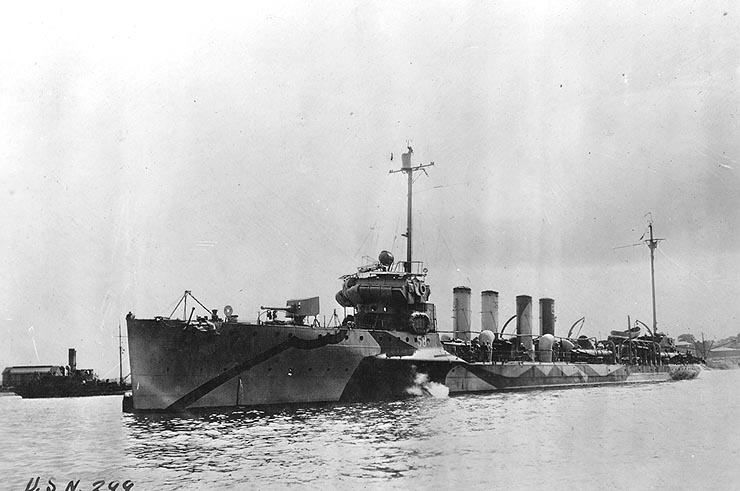
Conyngham in dazzle camouflage, c. 1918

USS Conyngham (DD-58) was laid down by the William Cramp & Sons of Philadelphia in July 1914 and launched in July of the following year. She was the first U.S. Navy vessel named for Gustavus Conyngham.

After her January 1916 commissioning, Conyngham sailed off the east coast and in the Caribbean. After the United States entered World War I in April 1917, Conyngham was part of the first U.S. destroyer squadron sent overseas. Patrolling the Irish Sea out of Queenstown, Ireland, Conyngham made several rescues of passengers and crew from ships sunk by U-boats. Conyngham's commander was commended for actions related to what was thought at the time to be a "probable" kill of a German submarine.

Upon returning to the United States in December 1918, Conyngham underwent repairs at the Boston Navy Yard. She remained there in reduced commission through 1921, with only brief episodes of activity. After returning to active service for about a year, she was decommissioned in June 1922. In June 1924, Conyngham was transferred to the United States Coast Guard to help enforce Prohibition as a part of the "Rum Patrol". She operated under the name USCGC Conyngham (CG-2) until 1933, when she was returned to the Navy. Later that year, the ship was renamed DD-58 to free the name Conyngham for another destroyer. She was sold for scrap in August 1934.

=== USS Porter (DD-59) ===
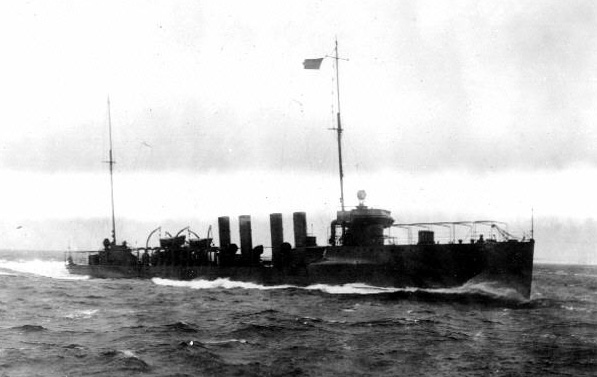
Porter during trials, 1916

USS Porter (DD-59) was laid down by the William Cramp & Sons of Philadelphia in August 1914 and launched in August of the following year. She was the second U.S. Navy vessel named in honor of both David Porter and his son David Dixon Porter.

After her April 1916 commissioning, Porter conducted her shakedown cruise in the Caribbean. After the United States entered World War I in April 1917, Porter was part of the first U.S. destroyer squadron sent overseas. Patrolling the Irish Sea out of Queenstown, Ireland, Porter severely damaged the German submarine U-108 in April 1918.

Upon returning to the United States after the war, Porter operated off the east coast until she was decommissioned in June 1922. In June 1924, Porter was transferred to the United States Coast Guard to help enforce Prohibition as a part of the "Rum Patrol". She operated under the name USCGC Porter (CG-7) until 1933, when she was returned to the Navy. Later that year, the ship was renamed DD-59 to free the name Porter for another destroyer. She was sold for scrap in August 1934.

=== USS Wadsworth (DD-60) ===
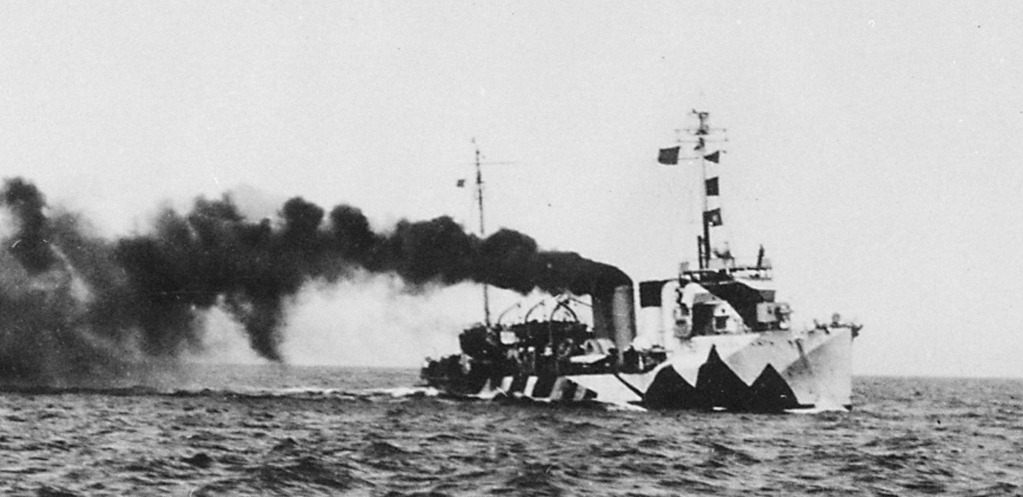
Wadsworth, c. 1917–1918

USS Wadsworth (DD-60) was laid down by the Bath Iron Works of Bath, Maine, in February 1914 and launched in April 1915. She was the first U.S. Navy vessel named for Alexander Scammel Wadsworth. Wadsworth's geared steam turbine power plant was a successful prototype that greatly influenced U.S. destroyer designs after 1915.

After her July 1915 commissioning, Wadsworth served on the neutrality patrol off the east coast and in the Caribbean. After the United States entered World War I in April 1917, Wadsworth was the flagship of the first U.S. destroyer squadron sent overseas. Patrolling the Irish Sea out of Queenstown, Ireland, Wadsworth reported several encounters with U-boats in the first months overseas. She was transferred to Brest, France, in March 1918, and spent the remainder of the war there.

Upon returning to the United States at the end of 1918, Wadsworth underwent a five-month overhaul. She served as a plane guard for the Navy's transatlantic flight attempt by four Navy-Curtiss flying boats in May. After two years in reduced commission in August, Wadsworth was reactivated in May 1921. She was decommissioned in June 1922, and spent nearly 14 years in reserve at the Philadelphia Navy Yard. She was struck from the Naval Vessel Register in January 1936, sold in June, and scrapped in August.

=== USS Jacob Jones (DD-61) ===
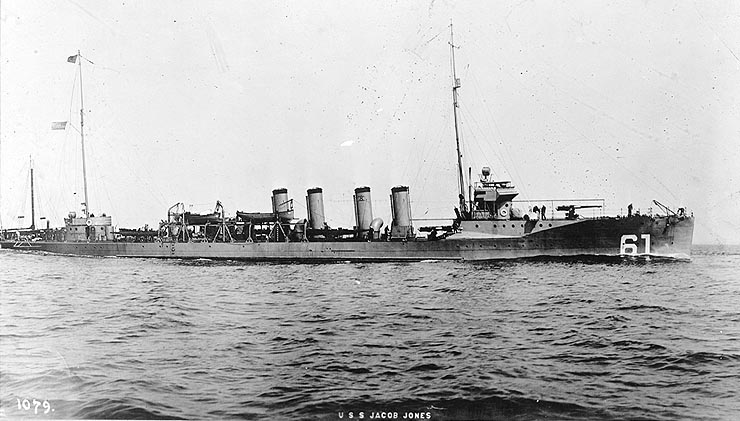
Jacob Jones underway, 1916

USS Jacob Jones (DD-61) was laid down by the New York Shipbuilding of Camden, New Jersey, in August 1914 and launched in May of the following year. She was the first U.S. Navy vessel named in honor of Jacob Jones.

After her February 1916 commissioning, Jacob Jones conducted patrols off the New England coast. After the United States entered World War I in April 1917, Jacob Jones was sent overseas. Patrolling the Irish Sea out of Queenstown, Ireland, Jacob Jones rescued the survivors of several ships, notably picking up over 300 from the sunken armed merchant cruiser Orama.

On 6 December, Jacob Jones was steaming independently from Brest, France, for Queenstown, when she was torpedoed and sunk by German submarine U-53 with the loss of 66 officers and men, becoming the first United States destroyer sunk by enemy action, and the only destroyer lost to the enemy by the US Navy in World War I. Jacob Jones sank in eight minutes without issuing a distress call; the German submarine commander, Kapitänleutnant Hans Rose, after rescuing two badly injured Jacob Jones crewmen, radioed the American base at Queenstown with the coordinates for the survivors before leaving the area.

=== USS Wainwright (DD-62) ===
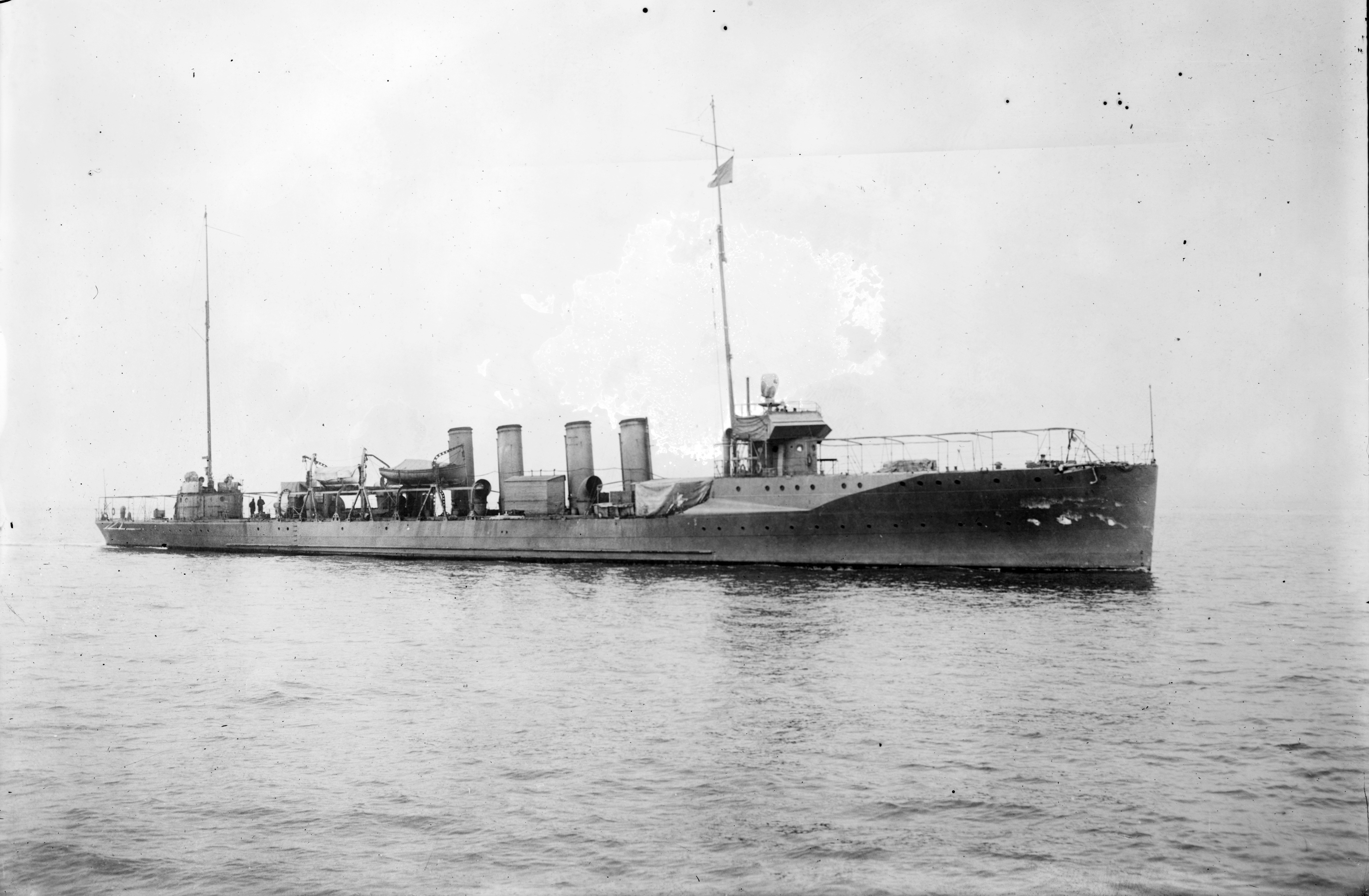
Wainwright, c. 1916–1922

USS Wainwright (DD-62) was laid down by the New York Shipbuilding of Camden, New Jersey, in September 1914 and launched in June of the following year. She was the first U.S. Navy vessel named in honor of U.S. Navy officers Jonathan Wainwright and Jonathan Wainwright Jr. (father and son), and Commander Richard Wainwright (cousin of the elder Jonathan).

After her May 1916 commissioning, Wainwright sailed off the east coast and in the Caribbean. After the United States entered World War I in April 1917, Wainwright was part of the first U.S. destroyer squadron sent overseas. Patrolling the Irish Sea out of Queenstown, Ireland, Wainwright made several unsuccessful attacks on U-boats, and rescued survivors of several ships sunk by the German craft.

Upon returning to the United States after the war, Wainwright resumed operations with the destroyers of the Atlantic Fleet until May 1922, when she was decommissioned. In April 1926, Wainwright was transferred to the United States Coast Guard to help enforce Prohibition as a part of the "Rum Patrol". She operated under the name USCGC Wainwright (CG-24) until April 1934, when she was returned to the Navy. She was sold for scrap in August 1934.

== Bibliography ==
- Bauer, K. Jack; Roberts, Stephen S. (1991). Register of Ships of the U.S. Navy, 1775–1990: Major Combatants. New York: Greenwood Press. ISBN 978-0-313-26202-9. OCLC 24010356.
- Cashman, Sean Dennis (1988). America in the Age of the Titans: The Progressive Era and World War I. New York: New York University Press. ISBN 978-0-8147-1411-9. OCLC 17234055.
- Friedman, Norman (2004) [1982]. U.S. destroyers: An Illustrated Design History (rev. ed.). Annapolis, Maryland: Naval Institute Press. ISBN 978-1-55750-442-5. OCLC 51861947.
- Gardiner, Robert, ed. (1985). Conway's All the World's Fighting Ships 1906–1921. Annapolis, Maryland: Naval Institute Press. ISBN 978-0-87021-907-8. OCLC 12119866.
- Silverstone, Paul H., U.S. Warships of World War I (Ian Allan, 1970), ISBN 0-71100-095-6.
- Naval History & Heritage Command. "Conyngham". Dictionary of American Naval Fighting Ships. Navy Department, Naval History and Heritage Command. Archived from the original on 17 May 2007.
- Naval History & Heritage Command. "Jacob Jones". Dictionary of American Naval Fighting Ships. Navy Department, Naval History & Heritage Command. Archived from the original on 9 April 2010.
- Naval History & Heritage Command. "Porter". Dictionary of American Naval Fighting Ships. Navy Department, Naval History & Heritage Command. Archived from the original on 8 December 2010.
- Naval History & Heritage Command. "Tucker". Dictionary of American Naval Fighting Ships. Navy Department, Naval History & Heritage Command. Archived from the original on 15 February 2011.
- Naval History & Heritage Command. "Wadsworth". Dictionary of American Naval Fighting Ships. Navy Department, Naval History & Heritage Command. Archived from the original on 9 April 2010.
- Naval History & Heritage Command. "Wainwright". Dictionary of American Naval Fighting Ships. Navy Department, Naval History & Heritage Command. Archived from the original on 9 April 2010.
