= Rum Patrol =

Law enforcement operation in the United States

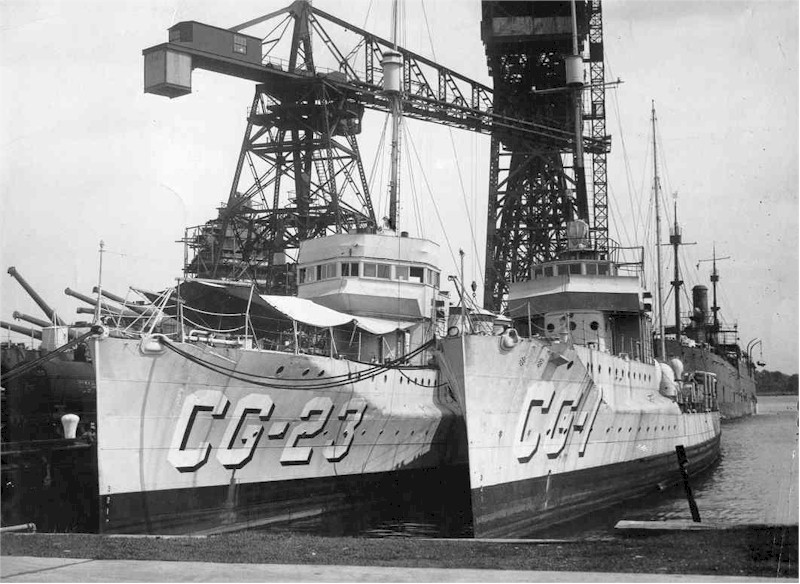
- Rum Patrol ships USCGD Tucker and USCGD Cassin, circa 1930
- Objective: Enforce prohibition in United States waters
- Date: 1920–1933
- Executed by: United States

The Rum Patrol was an operation of the United States Coast Guard to interdict liquor smuggling vessels, known as "rum runners" in order to enforce prohibition in American waters. On 18 December 1917, the 18th Amendment to the Constitution was submitted to the states by Congress. On 16 January 1919, the amendment was ratified and the Liquor Prohibition Amendment, which prohibited the manufacture, sale, transportation, importation, or exportation of intoxicating liquors, came into effect on 16 January 1920.

== History ==
=== Origin ===
The establishment of prohibition gave rise to smuggling of illicit liquor into the United States overland from Canada and from ships moored just outside the three-mile limit along the Atlantic seaboard. By 1921, "Rum Row" existed off New York City and the New Jersey shore as well as near Boston, and the Chesapeake and Delaware bays. The Florida coast and New Orleans were also points of entry used by rum runners. Smaller boats were used to transfer the cargos from the mother ships on Rum Row under cover of darkness to the shore. In February 1922, the Commandant of the Coast Guard, Rear Admiral William E. Reynolds, informed Assistant Secretary of the Treasury Roy Asa Haynes that although the Coast Guard was tasked with the enforcement of prohibition, Congress had not included any funding for the additional maintenance and operation of vessels. Since there was no funding, enforcement by Coast Guard vessels was in connection with other enforcement duties. The first important seizure was the British-registered schooner Henry L. Marshall by USCGC Seneca in 1921.

=== Funding problems ===
Since the Coast Guard was tasked with prohibiting the importation of liquor through U.S. waters and it didn't have the resources to do so, Commandant Reynolds submitted a plan to Treasury Secretary Andrew Mellon that called for 20 new cutters, 200 coastal patrol cutters and 90 fast picket boats. He also asked for 20 million dollars to fund new construction and an additional 3,500 personnel to man the new vessels.

=== Congress acts ===
To deal with this problem, twenty-five destroyers were transferred by the United States Navy to the Treasury Department for service with the Coast Guard. Some began to show signs of wear and tear after the often arduous pace of operations on the Rum Patrol and required replacement. Accordingly, six of the newer flush deck destroyers were transferred to the Treasury Department in 1930–1932.

It was thought that adapting these older vessels for Coast Guard service would be less costly than building new ships. In the end, however, the rehabilitation of the vessels was costly because of the exceedingly poor condition of many of these war-weary ships. In many instances, it took nearly a year to bring the vessels up to seaworthiness. Additionally, these were by far the largest and most sophisticated vessels ever operated by the service, and trained personnel were nearly nonexistent. As a result, Congress authorized hundreds of new enlistees. These inexperienced men generally made up the destroyer crews.

Some of the destroyers were pre-World War I 742-ton "flivvers", capable of over 25 kn (29 mph; 46 km/h) – an advantage in the rum-chasing business. They were, however, easily outmaneuvered by smaller vessels. The destroyers’ mission, therefore, was to picket the larger mother ships and prevent them from off-loading their cargo onto the smaller, speedier contact boats that ran the liquor into shore.

On 20 February 1933, the 21st Amendment to the Constitution, the repeal of Amendment 18, was proposed by Congress and ratification was completed on 5 December 1933. This eliminated prohibition, and therefore the need for the Rum Patrol. The remaining destroyers were returned to the Navy and sold for scrap.

== Ships of the patrol ==
Coast Guard designation	Navy designation	Ship Class	USCG Acquired	USCG Commissioning	USCG Decommissioning
USCGD Cassin (CG-1)	USS Cassin (DD-43)	Cassin class	28 April 1924	30 August 1924	5 June 1933
USCGD Conyngham (CG-2)	USS Conyngham (DD-58)	Tucker class	7 June 1924	8 March 1925	5 June 1933
USCGD Cummings (CG-3)	USS Cummings (DD-44)	Cassin class	7 June 1924	15 May 1925	30 April 1932
USCGD Downes (CG-4)	USS Downes (DD-45)	Cassin class	28 April 1924	14 October 1924	18 November 1930
USCGD Ericsson (CG-5)	USS Ericsson (DD-56)	O'Brien class	7 June 1924	28 May 1925	30 April 1932
USCGD McDougal (CG-6)	USS McDougal (DD-54)	O'Brien class	7 June 1924	13 May 1925	26 May 1933
USCGD Porter (CG-7)	USS Porter (DD-59)	Tucker class	7 June 1924	20 February 1925	5 June 1933
USCGD Ammen (CG-8)	USS Ammen (DD-35)	Paulding class	28 April 1924	22 January 1925	18 May 1931
USCGD Beale (CG-9)	USS Beale (DD-40)	Paulding class	28 April 1924	26 October 1924	1 June 1930
USCGD Burrows (CG-10)	USS Burrows (DD-29)	Paulding class	7 June 1924	30 June 1925	14 February 1931
USCGD Fanning (CG-11)	USS Fanning (DD-37)	Paulding class	7 June 1924	30 May 1925	12 August 1930
USCGD Henley (CG-12)	USS Henley (DD-39)	Paulding class	16 May 1924	14 November 1924	30 January 1931
USCGD Jouett (CG-13)	USS Jouett (DD-41)	Paulding class	28 April 1924	23 August 1924	16 May 1931
USCGD McCall (CG-14)	USS McCall (DD-28)	Paulding class	7 June 1924	17 June 1925	12 August 1930
USCGD Monaghan (CG-15)	USS Monaghan (DD-32)	Paulding class	7 June 1924	30 June 1925	29 January 1931
USCGD Upshur (CG-15)	USS Abel P. Upshur (DD-193)	Clemson class	5 November 1930	12 January 1931	21 May 1934
USCGD Patterson (CG-16)	USS Patterson (DD-36)	Paulding class	28 April 1924	24 November 1924	1 April 1930
USCGD Badger (CG-16)	USS George E. Badger (DD-196)	Clemson class	1 October 1930	20 March 1931	21 May 1934
USCGD Paulding (CG-17)	USS Paulding (DD-22)	Paulding class	28 April 1924	23 January 1925	12 August 1930
USCGD Herndon (CG-17)(CG-16)	USS Herndon (DD-198)	Clemson class	13 September 1930	7 March 1931	28 May 1934
USCGD Roe (CG-18)	USS Roe (DD-24)	Paulding class	7 June 1924	30 May 1925	4 March 1930
USCGD Hunt (CG-18)(CG-16)	USS Hunt (DD-194)	Clemson class	13 September 1930	5 February 1931	28 May 1934
USCGD Terry (CG-19)	USS Terry (DD-25)	Paulding class	7 June 1924	30 June 1925	12 August 1930
USCGD Wood (CG-19)(CG-16)	USS Welborn C. Wood (DD-195)	Clemson class	1 October 1930	15 April 1931	21 May 1934
USCGD Trippe (CG-20)	USS Trippe (DD-33)	Paulding class	7 June 1924	24 June 1924	15 April 1931
USCGD Semmes (CG-20)(CG-16)	USS Semmes (DD-189)	Clemson class	25 April 1932	25 April 1932	20 April 1934
USCGD Davis (CG-21)	USS Davis (DD-65)	Sampson class	25 March 1926	4 September 1926	5 June 1933
USCGD Shaw (CG-22)	USS Shaw (DD-68)	Sampson class	25 March 1926	13 July 1926	5 June 1933
USCGD Tucker (CG-23)	USS Tucker (DD-57)	Tucker class	25 March 1926	29 September 1926	5 June 1933
USCGD Wainwright (CG-24)	USS Wainwright (DD-62)	Tucker class	2 April 1926	30 July 1926	29 March 1934
USCGD Wilkes (CG-25)	USS Wilkes (DD-67)	Sampson class	25 March 1926	23 August 1926	29 March 1934
