= USS Porter (DD-59) =

Tucker-class destroyer

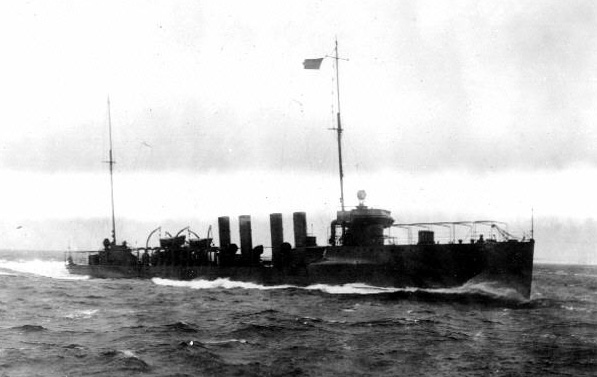
- USS Porter (DD-59), undergoing trials, 8 March 1916

History

United States
- Name: Porter
- Namesake: David Dixon Porter
- Ordered: 1913
- Builder: William Cramp & Sons; Philadelphia
- Cost: $878,683.78 (hull and machinery)
- Yard number: 420
- Laid down: 24 August 1914
- Launched: 26 August 1915
- Sponsored by: Miss Georgiana Porter Cusachs
- Commissioned: 17 April 1916
- Decommissioned: 23 June 1922
- Stricken: 5 July 1934
- Identification: Hull symbol:DD-56; Code letters:NOO
- Fate: transferred to U.S. Coast Guard, 7 June 1924; sold on 22 August 1934
- Notes: lost her name to new construction on July 1, 1933, referred to as DD-59 afterward

United States
- Name: Porter
- Acquired: 7 June 1924
- Commissioned: 20 February 1925, Delaware Bay
- Decommissioned: 5 June 1933
- Identification: Hull symbol:CG-7
- Fate: returned to U.S. Navy, 30 June 1933

General characteristics
- Class & type: Tucker-class destroyer
- Displacement: 1,090 long tons (1,110 t); 1,205 long tons (1,224 t) fully loaded
- Length: 315 ft 3 in (96.09 m)
- Beam: 30 ft 7 in (9.32 m)
- Draft: 9 ft 4 1/2 in (2.858 m) (mean); 10 ft 5 in (3.18 m) (max)
- Installed power: 4 × Yarrow boilers; 18,000 shp (13,000 kW)
- Propulsion: 2 × Curtis geared steam turbines; 2 × screw propellers
- Speed: 29.5 kn (33.9 mph; 54.6 km/h); 29.58 kn (34.04 mph; 54.78 km/h) (Speed on Trial)
- Complement: 5 officers 96 enlisted
- Armament: 4 × 4 in (100 mm)/50 caliber guns; 8 × 21 inch (533 mm) torpedo tubes (4 × 2)

USS Porter (Destroyer No. 59/DD-59) was a Tucker-class destroyer built for the United States Navy prior to the American entry into World War I. The ship was the second U.S. Navy vessel named in honor of both David Porter and his son David Dixon Porter.

Porter was laid down by the William Cramp & Sons of Philadelphia, in August 1914 and launched in August of the following year. The ship was a little more than 315 feet (96 m) in length, just over 30 feet (9.1 m) abeam, and had a standard displacement of 1,090 long tons (1,110 t). She was armed with four 4-inch (10 cm) guns and had eight 21 inch (533 mm) torpedo tubes. Porter was powered by a pair of steam turbines that propelled her at up to 29.5 knots (54.6 km/h).

After her April 1916 commissioning, Porter conducted her shakedown cruise in the Caribbean. After the United States entered World War I in April 1917, Porter was part of the first U.S. destroyer squadron sent overseas. Patrolling the Irish and Celtic Sea out of Queenstown, Ireland, Porter severely damaged the German submarine U-108 in April 1918.

Upon returning to the United States after the war, Porter operated off the east coast until she was decommissioned in June 1922. In June 1924, Porter was transferred to the United States Coast Guard to help enforce Prohibition as a part of the "Rum Patrol". She operated under the name USCGC Porter (CG-7) until 1933, when she was returned to the Navy. Later that year, the ship was renamed DD-59 to free the name Porter for another destroyer. She was sold for scrap in August 1934.

== Design and construction ==
Porter was authorized in 1913 as the third ship of the Tucker class which, like the related O'Brien class, was an improved version of the Cassin-class destroyers authorized in 1911. Construction of the vessel was awarded to William Cramp & Sons of Philadelphia, which laid down her keel on 24 August 1914. Twelve months later, on 26 August 1915, Porter was launched by sponsor Miss Georgiana Porter Cusachs, a descendant of the ship's namesakes, Commodore David Porter (1780–1843) and son Admiral David Dixon Porter (1813–1891), both notable U.S. Navy officers. As built, Porter was 315 feet 3 inches (96.09 m) in length and 30 feet 6 inches (9.30 m) abeam and drew 9 feet 4 inches (2.84 m). The ship had a standard displacement of 1,090 long tons (1,110 t) and displaced 1,205 long tons (1,224 t) when fully loaded.

Porter had two Curtis steam turbines that drove her two screw propellers, and an additional steam turbine geared to one of the propeller shafts for cruising purposes. The power plant could generate 18,000 shaft horsepower (13,000 kW) and move the ship at speeds up to 29.5 knots (54.6 km/h).

Porter's main battery consisted of four 4-inch (102 mm)/50 Mark 9 guns, (Note: The 50 denotes the length of the gun barrels; in this case, the gun is 50 calibers, meaning that the gun is 50 times as long as it is in diameter, 200 inches (5.1 m) in this case. The Mark number is the version of the gun; in this case, the ninth U.S. Navy design of the 4-inch/50 gun.) with each gun weighing in excess of 6,100 pounds (2,800 kg). The guns fired 33-pound (15 kg) armor-piercing projectiles at 2,900 feet per second (880 m/s). At an elevation of 20°, the guns had a range of 15,920 yards (14,560 m).

Porter was also equipped with eight 21-inch (533 mm) torpedo tubes. The General Board of the United States Navy had called for two anti-aircraft guns for the Tucker-class ships, as well as provisions for laying up to 36 floating mines. From sources, it is unclear if these recommendations were followed for Porter or any of the other ships of the class.

== United States Navy career ==
USS Porter was commissioned into the United States Navy on 17 April 1916. Following her commissioning, Porter's shakedown was conducted in the Caribbean.

After the United States entry into World War I on 6 April 1917, Porter was readied for overseas duty and departed from New York on 24 April with the other five ships of her division—Wadsworth (the flagship), Davis, Conyngham, McDougal, and Wainwright. The sextet arrived at Queenstown, Ireland, on 4 May and began patrolling the southern approaches to the Irish Sea the next day. Based at Queenstown, Porter met and escorted convoys from the United States as they entered the war zone.

On 16 October 1917, Porter came to the aid of American destroyer Cassin, which had been torpedoed by German submarine U-61 about 20 nautical miles (37 km) south of Mine Head, Ireland. Cassin's stern had nearly been blown off and her rudder was gone, leaving the ship unable to steer. Porter arrived at about 16:00 and stayed with Cassin until dusk when two British sloops, Jessamine and Tamarisk, took over for Porter; Cassin was towed to safety and later returned to patrol duty.

On 28 April 1918, Porter severely damaged U-108 while that German submarine was steaming to intercept a convoy. The destroyer was transferred to Brest, France, on 14 June. She returned to the United States at the end of the war, and operated off the East Coast until she was decommissioned on 23 June 1922.

== United States Coast Guard career ==
On 17 January 1920, Prohibition was instituted by law in the United States. Soon, the smuggling of alcoholic beverages along the coastlines of the United States became widespread and blatant. The Treasury Department eventually determined that the United States Coast Guard simply did not have the ships to constitute a successful patrol. To cope with the problem, President Calvin Coolidge in 1924 authorized the transfer from the Navy to the Coast Guard of twenty old destroyers that were in reserve and out of commission. Porter was reactivated and transferred to the Treasury Department on 7 June 1924 for use by the Coast Guard.

Designated CG-7, Porter was commissioned on 20 February 1925, and was stationed in New York for duties on the "Rum Patrol" to aid in the attempt to enforce prohibition laws. During her Coast Guard service, Porter captured the rum-running vessel Conseulo II (the former Louise) off the coast of Long Island.

After the United States Congress proposed the Twenty-first Amendment to end prohibition in February 1933, plans were made for Porter to be returned to the Navy. On 27 May 1933, Porter arrived at the Philadelphia Navy Yard, and was decommissioned nine days later, on 5 June. Porter was transferred back to the Navy on 30 June. Later in 1933 the ship was renamed DD-59 in order to free the name Porter for a new destroyer of the same name. DD-59 remained in noncommissioned status until struck from the Naval Vessel Register on 5 July 1934. She was sold for scrap on 22 August in accordance with the London Naval Treaty.

== Bibliography ==
- Feuer, A. B. (1999). The U.S. Navy in World War I. Westport, Connecticut: Praeger. ISBN 978-0-275-96212-8. OCLC 40595325.
- Gardiner, Robert; Gray, Randal, eds. (1985). Conway's All the World's Fighting Ships 1906–1921. Annapolis, Maryland: Naval Institute Press. ISBN 978-0-87021-907-8. OCLC 12119866.
- Naval History & Heritage Command. "Cassin". Dictionary of American Naval Fighting Ships. Navy Department, Naval History and Heritage Command.
- Naval History & Heritage Command. "Porter". Dictionary of American Naval Fighting Ships. Navy Department, Naval History & Heritage Command.
- Naval History & Heritage Command. "Tucker". Dictionary of American Naval Fighting Ships. Navy Department, Naval History & Heritage Command.
- Naval History & Heritage Command. "Wadsworth". Dictionary of American Naval Fighting Ships. Navy Department, Naval History & Heritage Command.
