= French cruiser Dupetit-Thouars =

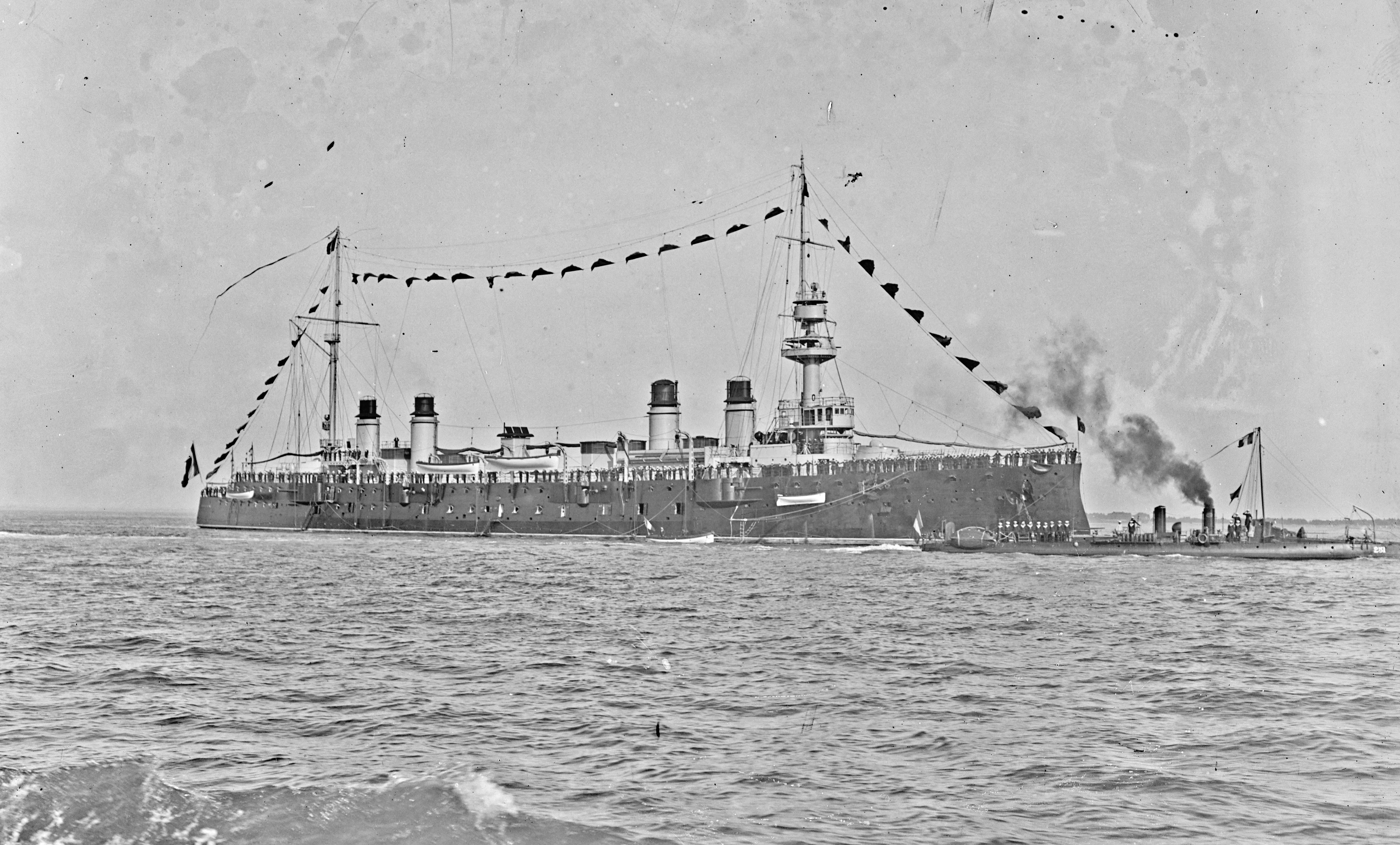
- Dupetit-Thouars at Saint-Nazaire, 23 September 1907

History

France
- Namesake: Aristide Aubert Du Petit Thouars
- Builder: Arsenal de Toulon
- Laid down: 1897
- Launched: 5 July 1901
- Fate: Sunk, 7 August 1918

General characteristics
- Class & type: Gueydon-class armoured cruiser
- Displacement: 9,367 tonnes (9,219 long tons)
- Length: 137.97 m (452 ft 8 in)
- Beam: 19.38 m (63 ft 7 in)
- Draught: 7.67 m (25 ft 2 in)
- Installed power: 22,000 PS (16,000 kW); 28 Belleville boilers
- Propulsion: 3 Shafts, 3 vertical triple-expansion steam engines
- Speed: 22 knots (41 km/h; 25 mph)
- Range: 8,500 nmi (15,700 km; 9,800 mi) at 10 knots (19 km/h; 12 mph)
- Complement: 566
- Armament: 2 × single 194 mm (7.6 in)/40 guns; 8 × single 164 mm (6.5 in)/45 guns; 4 × single 100 mm (3.9 in)/45 guns; 10 × single 47 mm (1.9 in)/55 guns; 4 × single 37 mm (1.5 in) guns; 2 × 450 mm (17.7 in) torpedo tubes
- Armour: Waterline belt: 80–150 mm (3.1–5.9 in); Deck: 30–55 mm (1.2–2.2 in); Gun turrets: 160–176 mm (6.3–6.9 in)

Dupetit-Thouars was a Gueydon-class armoured cruiser of the French Navy. She was torpedoed and sunk on 7 August 1918 by SM U-62 with the loss of 13 of her crew.

== Design and description ==
Designed by the naval architect Emile Bertin, the Gueydon-class ships were intended to fill the commerce-raiding strategy of the Jeune École. They measured 137.97 meters (452 ft 8 in) long overall with a beam of 19.38 meters (63 ft 7 in) and had a draught of 7.67 meters (25 ft 2 in). Dupetit-Thouars displaced 9,367 metric tons (9,219 long tons). The ship had a crew of 566 officers and enlisted men.

The Gueydon class had three vertical triple-expansion steam engines, each driving a single propeller shaft. Steam for Dupetit-Thouars's engines was provided by 28 Belleville boilers and they were rated at a total of 22,000 metric horsepower (16,000 kW) that gave them a speed of 22 knots (41 km/h; 25 mph). The ships enough coal to steam for 8,500 nautical miles (15,700 km; 9,800 mi) at a speed of 10 knots (19 km/h; 12 mph).

The Gueydons had a main armament that consisted of two 40-caliber 194 mm (7.6 in) guns that were mounted in single gun turrets, one each fore and aft of the superstructure. Their secondary armament comprised eight 45-caliber quick-firing (QF) Canon de 164 mm (6.5 in) Modèle 1893 guns in casemates. For anti-torpedo boat defense, they carried four 45-caliber QF Canon de 100 mm (3.9 in) Modèle 1891 guns on the forecastle deck, as well as ten QF 47 mm (1.9 in) and four QF 37 mm (1.5 in) Hotchkiss guns. They were also armed with two submerged 450-millimetre (17.7 in) torpedo tubes.

The Harvey armor belt of the Gueydon-class cruisers covered most of the ships' hull. The lower strake of armor was generally 150 millimetres (5.9 in) thick, although it reduced to 91 millimetres (3.6 in) forward, 81 millimetres (3.2 in) aft. The curved lower protective deck ranged in thickness from 51 to 56 millimetres (2.0 to 2.2 in). The gun turrets were protected by 160–176-millimetre (6.3–6.9 in) armor and had roofs 23 millimetres (0.9 in) thick.

== Construction and career ==
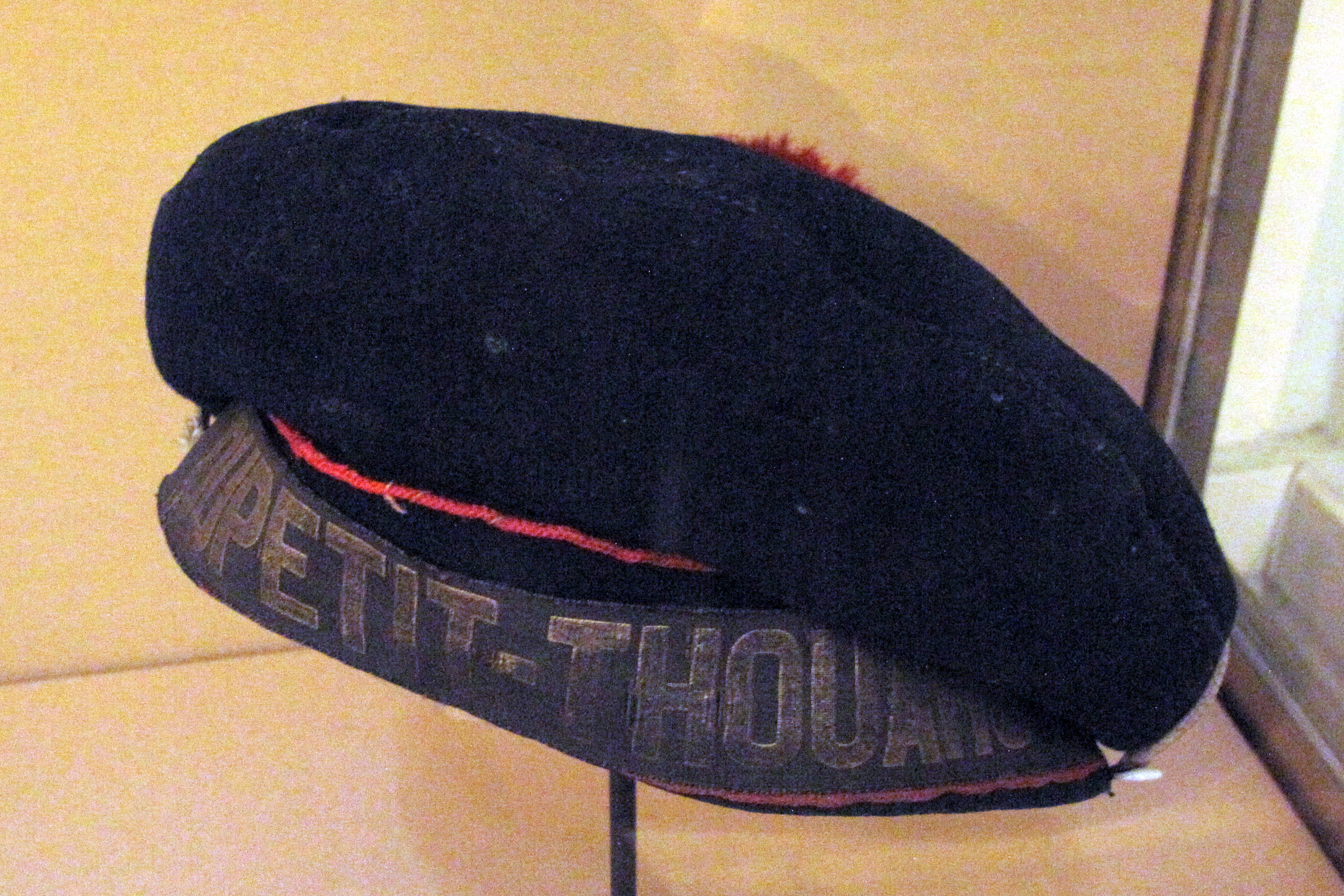
Sailor hat of Dupetit-Thouars

Dupetit-Thouars took part in the First World War.

In 1918, she was part of the Atlantic Naval Division, under Commander Paqué, and tasked with escort duty. On 7 August 1918, escorting a 24-ship convoy inbound from New York, she was torpedoed by the submarine U-62, off Brest. At nightfall, at 20:51, a torpedo hit the port side underneath the forward bridge, followed ten seconds after by another under the aft bridge. The explosions killed three men, and neither the submarine nor her periscope were spotted, although a Lieutenant detected the first torpedo shortly before it hit.

Assessment of the ship soon revealed extensive damage, but as the list was moderate, the officers deemed that although the ship was lost, she would not sink rapidly. They moved the ship off the route of the convoy, radioed a distress call, and stopped the engines to allow the crew to evacuate. The list then started to increase while the crew abandoned ship. Fifty minutes after the torpedo hit, Dupetit-Thouars rolled over and sank, killing ten sailors still aboard trying to launch the last raft. Following the sinking, U-62 surfaced to inquire as to the name and tonnage of the cruiser, and collect a ribbon from a sailor's hat.

The survivors spent 16 hours in boats and rafts before being rescued the next day, in late afternoon, by six US destroyers Tucker, Drayton, Winslow, Porter, Warrington and Fanning.

Dupetit-Thouars was mentioned in dispatches at the Army level on 25 October 1919, the mention stating

the armoured cruiser Dupetit-Thouars: during an escort mission, was torpedoed and sunk on 7 August 1918 by an enemy submarine. The whole personnel demonstrated, in these circumstances, the greatest calm and the high dedication.

== Bibliography ==
- Campbell, N. J. M. (1979). "France". In Chesneau, Roger & Kolesnik, Eugene M. (eds.). Conway's All the World's Fighting Ships 1860–1905. Greenwich: Conway Maritime Press. pp. 283–333. ISBN 0-8317-0302-4.
- Couhat, Jean Labayle (1974). French Warships of World War I. London: Ian Allan. ISBN 0-7110-0445-5.
- Friedman, Norman (2011). Naval Weapons of World War One: Guns, Torpedoes, Mines and ASW Weapons of All Nations; An Illustrated Directory. Barnsley, UK: Seaforth Publishing. ISBN 978-1-84832-100-7.
- Jordan, John & Caresse, Philippe (2019). French Armoured Cruisers 1887–1932. Barnsley, UK: Seaforth Publishing. ISBN 978-1-5267-4118-9.
- Roberts, Stephen S. (2021). French Warships in the Age of Steam 1859–1914: Design, Construction, Careers and Fates. Barnsley, UK: Seaforth Publishing. ISBN 978-1-5267-4533-0.
- Silverstone, Paul H. (1984). Directory of the World's Capital Ships. New York: Hippocrene Books. ISBN 0-88254-979-0.
