= USS Wadsworth (DD-60) =

Tucker-class destroyer

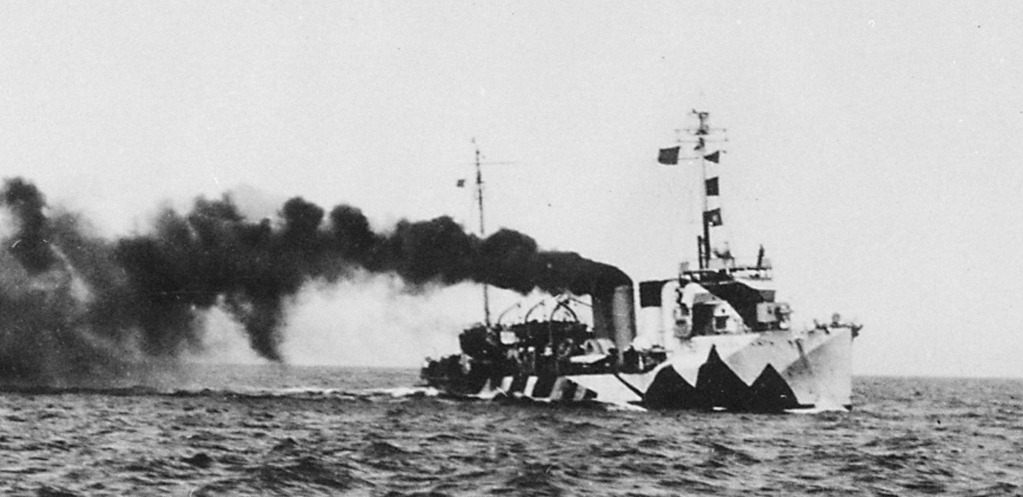
- Wadsworth laying a smoke screen, May 1918

History

United States
- Name: USS Wadsworth
- Namesake: Alexander Scammel Wadsworth
- Ordered: 1913
- Builder: Bath Iron Works; Bath, Maine
- Yard number: 64
- Laid down: 23 February 1914
- Launched: 29 April 1915
- Commissioned: 23 July 1915
- Decommissioned: 3 June 1922
- Stricken: 7 January 1936
- Fate: Sold for scrapping on 30 June 1936

General characteristics
- Class & type: Tucker-class destroyer
- Displacement: 1,060 long tons (1,080 t)
- Length: 315 ft 3 in (96.09 m)
- Beam: 29 ft 9 in (9.07 m)
- Draft: 9 ft 2 in (2.79 m)
- Propulsion: 2 × screw propellers; 2 × Curtis geared steam turbines, 17,500 shp (13,000 kW); 4 × Yarrow boilers
- Speed: 30.67 knots (56.80 km/h)
- Complement: 99 officers and enlisted
- Armament: 4 × 4 in (102 mm)/50 gun; 8 × 21 inch (533 mm) torpedo tubes

USS Wadsworth (Destroyer No. 60/DD-60) was a Tucker-class destroyer built for the United States Navy prior to the American entry into World War I. The ship was the first U.S. Navy vessel named for Alexander Scammel Wadsworth.

Wadsworth was laid down by the Bath Iron Works of Bath, Maine, in February 1914 and launched in April 1915. The ship was a little more than 315 feet (96 m) in length, nearly 30 feet (9.1 m) abeam, and displaced 1,060 long tons (1,080 t). She was armed with four 4-inch (10 cm) guns and had eight 21 inch (533 mm) torpedo tubes. Wadsworth's geared steam turbine power plant was a successful prototype that greatly influenced U.S. destroyer designs after 1915.

After her July 1915 commissioning, Wadsworth served on the neutrality patrol off the east coast and in the Caribbean. After the United States entered World War I in April 1917, Wadsworth was the flagship of the first U.S. destroyer squadron sent overseas. Patrolling the Irish Sea out of Queenstown, Ireland, Wadsworth reported several encounters with U-boats in the first months overseas. She was transferred to Brest, France, in March 1918, and spent the remainder of the war there.

Upon returning to the United States at the end of 1918, Wadsworth underwent a five-month overhaul. She served as a plane guard for the Navy's transatlantic flight attempt by four Navy-Curtiss flying boats in May. After two years in reduced commission in August, Wadsworth was reactivated in May 1921. She was decommissioned in June 1922, and spent nearly 14 years in reserve at the Philadelphia Navy Yard. She was struck from the Naval Vessel Register in January 1936, sold in June, and scrapped in August.

== Design and construction ==
Wadsworth was authorized in 1913 as a part of the Tucker class which, like the related O'Brien class, was an improved version of the Cassin-class destroyers authorized in 1911. Construction of the vessel was awarded to Bath Iron Works of Bath, Maine, which laid down her keel on 23 February 1914. Fourteen months later, on 29 April 1915, Wadsworth was launched by sponsor Juanita Doane Wells. The ship was named after Commodore Alexander Scammel Wadsworth (1790–1851), a U.S. Navy officer during the War of 1812 and later the Navy's Inspector of Ordnance. As built, Wadsworth was 315 feet 3 inches (96.09 m) in length and 29 feet 9 inches (9.07 m) abeam and drew 9 feet 2 inches (2.79 m). The ship had a standard displacement of 1,060 long tons (1,080 t) and displaced 1,205 long tons (1,224 t) when fully loaded.

Unlike the rest of the Tucker-class ships—which had differing arrangements of steam turbines and reciprocating engines for cruising—Wadsworth was designed with what became the main United States prototype installation of her two Curtis geared steam turbines. According to Conway's All the World's Fighting Ships 1906–1921, the mechanical design for Wadsworth had a "considerable effect" on post-1915 U.S. destroyer designs. As installed, the steam turbines could generate 17,500 shaft horsepower (13,000 kW) and move the ship at speeds up to 29.5 knots (54.6 km/h), though Wadsworth reached a top speed of 30.67 knots (56.80 km/h) during her trials.

Wadsworth's main battery consisted of four 4-inch (100 mm)/50 Mark 9 guns, (Note: The 50 denotes the length of the gun barrels; in this case, the gun is 50 calibers, meaning that the gun is 50 times as long as it is in diameter, 200 inches (5.1 m) in this case. The Mark number is the version of the gun; in this case, the ninth U.S. Navy design of the 4-inch/50 gun.) with each gun weighing in excess of 6,100 pounds (2,800 kg). The guns fired 33-pound (15 kg) armor-piercing projectiles at 2,900 feet per second (880 m/s). At an elevation of 20°, the guns had a range of 15,920 yards (14,560 m).

Wadsworth was also equipped with eight 21-inch (533 mm) torpedo tubes. The General Board of the United States Navy had called for two anti-aircraft guns for the Tucker-class ships, as well as provisions for laying up to 36 floating mines. From sources, it is unclear if these recommendations were followed for Wadsworth or any of the Tucker ships.

== Early career ==
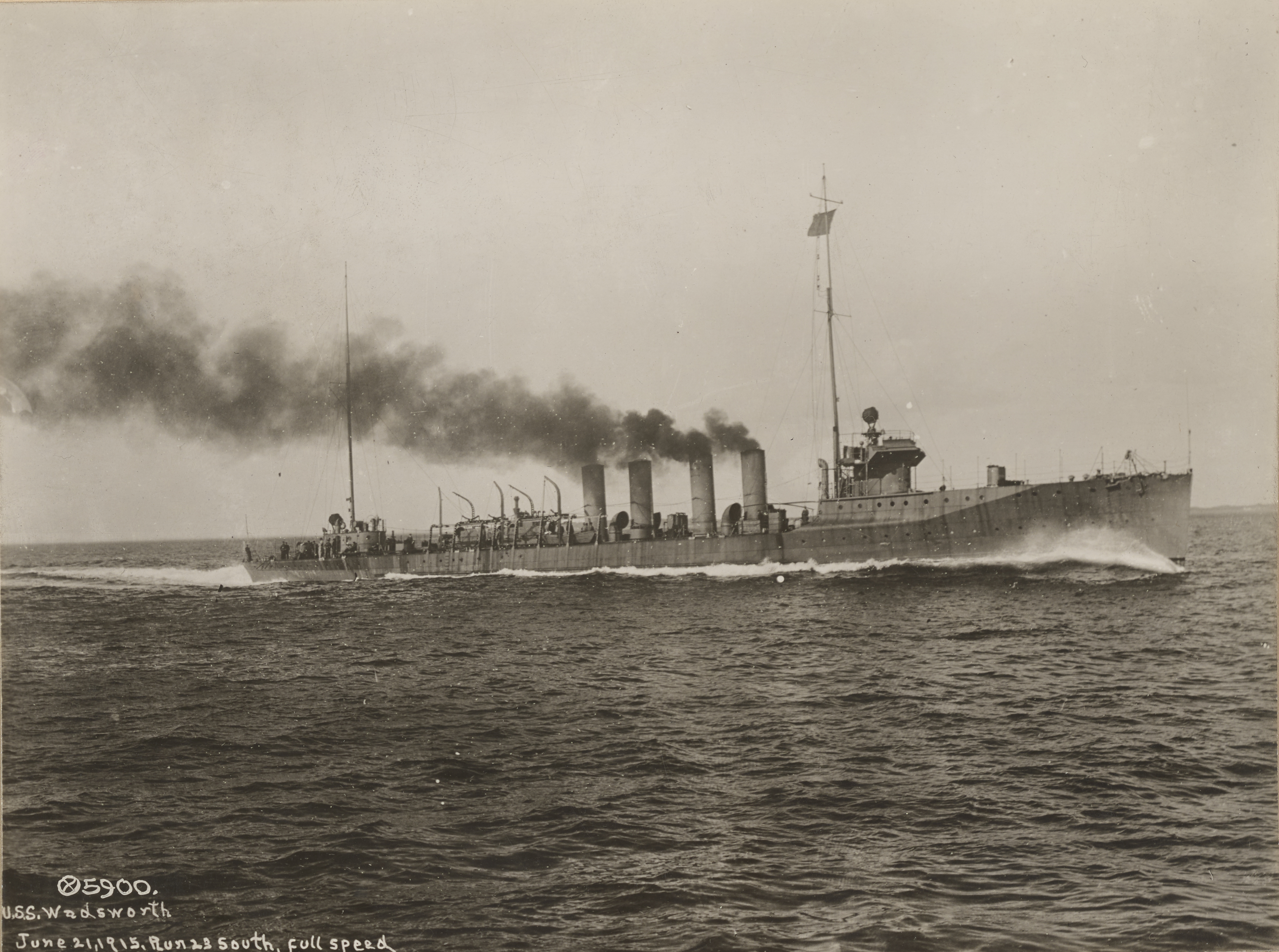
Wadsworth during trials

USS Wadsworth was commissioned into the United States Navy at the Boston Navy Yard on 23 July 1915 under the command of Lieutenant Commander Joseph K. Taussig. After trials and torpedo firing drills out of Newport, Rhode Island, the destroyer took up duty off the New England coast line in October. Her duty included patrols to insure America's neutrality vis-a-vis the year-old European war. On 7 January 1916, she departed Provincetown, Massachusetts, to join in the annual Fleet maneuvers in the Caribbean. After a stop at Norfolk, Virginia, she reached the West Indies at Culebra Island on 15 January and began a three-month round of war games, drills, and exercises. During her stay in the Caribbean, she visited Guantanamo Bay, Guacanayabo Bay, Manzanillo, and Santiago — all in Cuba. On 10 April, she left Guantanamo Bay to steam north, stopped at New York for a five-week stay, and returned to Newport on 21 May. Wadsworth resumed operations along the New England coast, and the succeeding year passed in much the same way as had its predecessor — summer operations along the northeastern coast followed by Fleet maneuvers in the Caribbean.

At the completion of her second round of winter Fleet maneuvers in the spring of 1917, Wadsworth returned north as far as Hampton Roads. As America's entry into World War I approached, she and her sister destroyers began patrolling the Norfolk–Yorktown area to protect the naval bases and ships there against potential incursions by German submarines.

== World War I ==
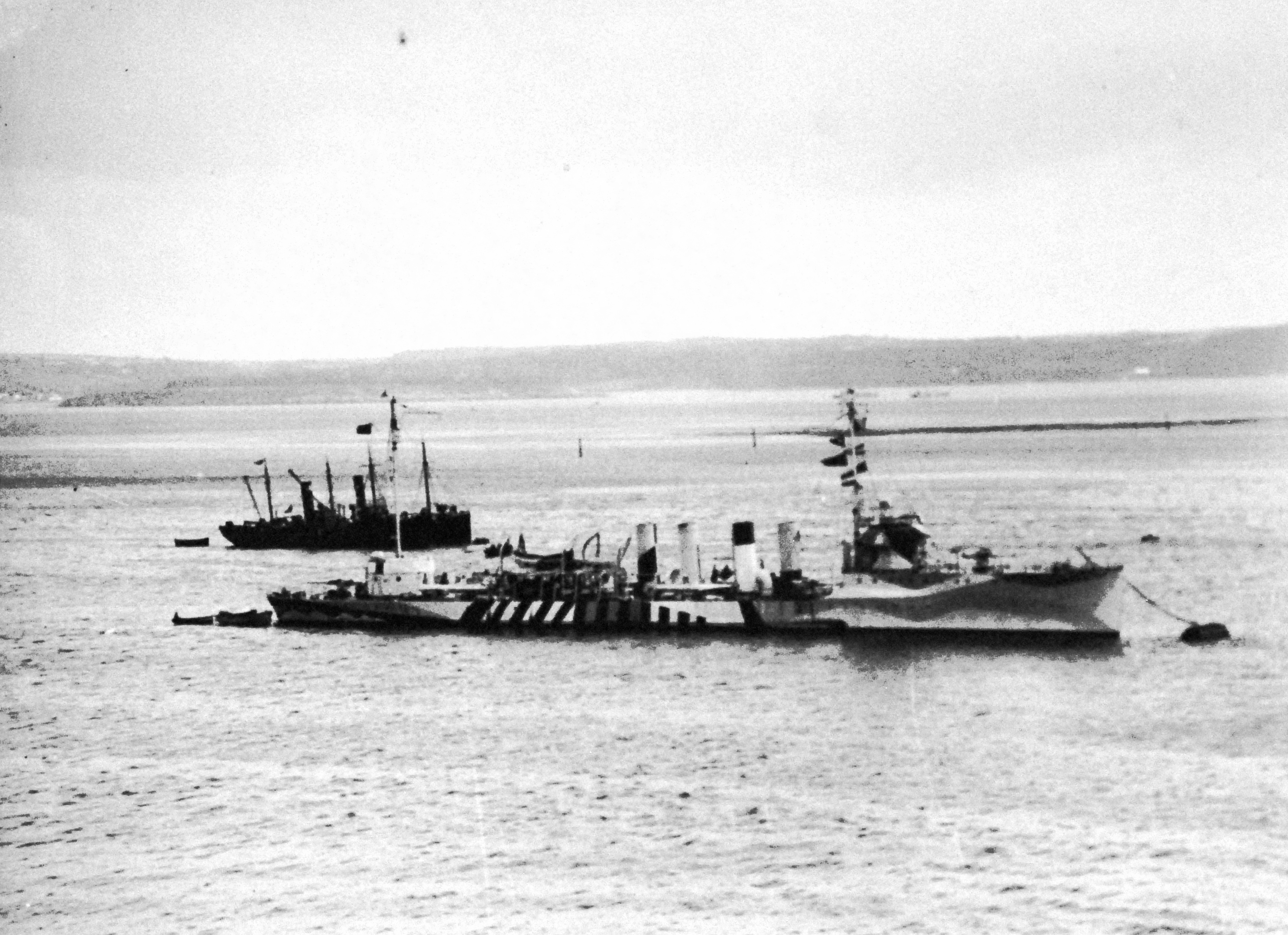
Wadsworth anchored at Queenstown, Ireland

On 6 April 1917, while Wadsworth was at anchor with the rest of the Fleet at Yorktown, the United States entered World War I. Wadsworth moved to New York almost immediately to prepare for the voyage to Europe and war service. On 24 April, she departed New York for Europe, as the flagship of Commander Joseph K. Taussig, commanding Division 8, Destroyer Force, the first six-ship destroyer division dispatched to United Kingdom. She led Porter, Davis, Conyngham, McDougal, and Wainwright into Queenstown, Ireland, on 4 May and began patrolling the southern approaches to the Irish Sea the next day.

Wadsworth's first summer overseas proved to be the most eventful period of her wartime service. She sighted her first U-boat on 18 May, less than two weeks after she began patrols out of Queenstown. Though the destroyer sped to the attack, the submarine dove and escaped. Three days later, Wadsworth picked up some survivors from HMS Paxton which had been torpedoed and sunk the preceding day. On 7 June, the destroyer caught a glimpse of another enemy submarine just before it submerged and escaped. Between 24 and 27 June, Wadsworth served as part of the escort for the first American troop convoy to reach Europe. Though she scored no definitely provable successes against German submarines, the destroyer made depth charge attacks on four separate occasions in July and a gunfire attack in one other instance. The first two depth-charge attacks, on 10 and 11 July, returned no results whatsoever, and the gun attack on 20 July was similarly unrewarding. However, after sighting a double periscope the following day, Wadsworth made another depth-charge attack. During that attack, one of the explosions seemed much stronger than those from the other charges she dropped. Moreover, a patch of reddish-brown material rose to the surface. Although it seemed certain that the destroyer had damaged a submarine, no conclusive evidence was found to prove this possibility.

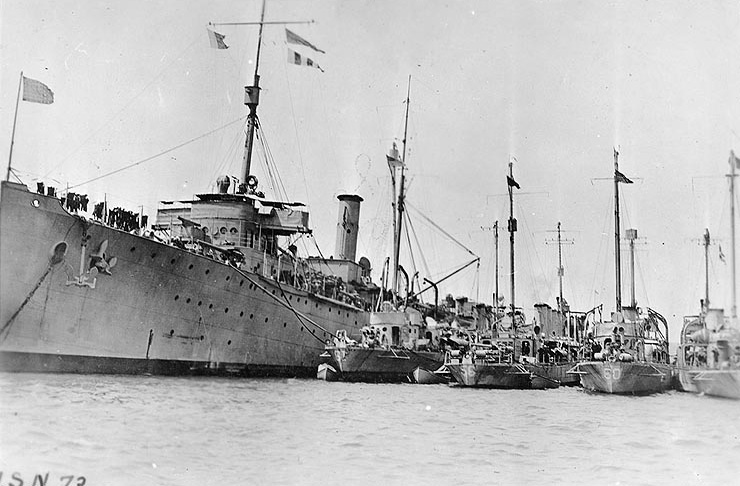
Wadsworth (second ship from the right) and other destroyers moored next to destroyer tender Melville in Queenstown in 1917.

Wadsworth made her fourth depth charge attack on a U-boat on 29 July. At about 17:25, she dropped several charges in what appeared to be the wake of a submarine proceeding submerged. The conjecture that a U-boat was damaged was supported by the appearance of a large amount of heavy oil on the surface following the attack. Just before 23:00, the warship attacked another supposed submarine wake. It was too dark to evaluate the results; but, not long thereafter, Trippe struck a submerged metallic object which caused her to list 10° temporarily. Later, Wadsworth's wireless operator intercepted messages sent by a German submarine over a period of about half an hour which suggested that Wadsworth may have damaged a submarine, although as with the depth-charge attack of 21 June, no definite proof was forthcoming. Early in August, the destroyer concluded her summer of peak activity by escorting the first United States merchant convoy on the last leg of its voyage to Europe. During the mission, on the 16th, the destroyer dropped a barrage on what was thought to be a submarine.

For the remainder of the war, her encounters with the enemy were infrequent. In fact, her next submarine contact did not occur until 17 December and, like those before, resulted in no definite damage to the enemy. Although the opening months of 1918 brought no new U-boat contacts, Wadsworth worked hard escorting convoys and patrolling British waters.

Early in March 1918, she received a change in assignment. On the 4th, she arrived in Brest, France, whence she operated for the remainder of the war. During that assignment, she recorded only two scrapes with German submarines: the first on 1 June and the second on 25 October. In each case, she dropped depth charges, but could produce no solid proof of damage to the enemy. The war ended on 11 November 1918 when Germany accepted Allied armistice terms.

== Later career ==
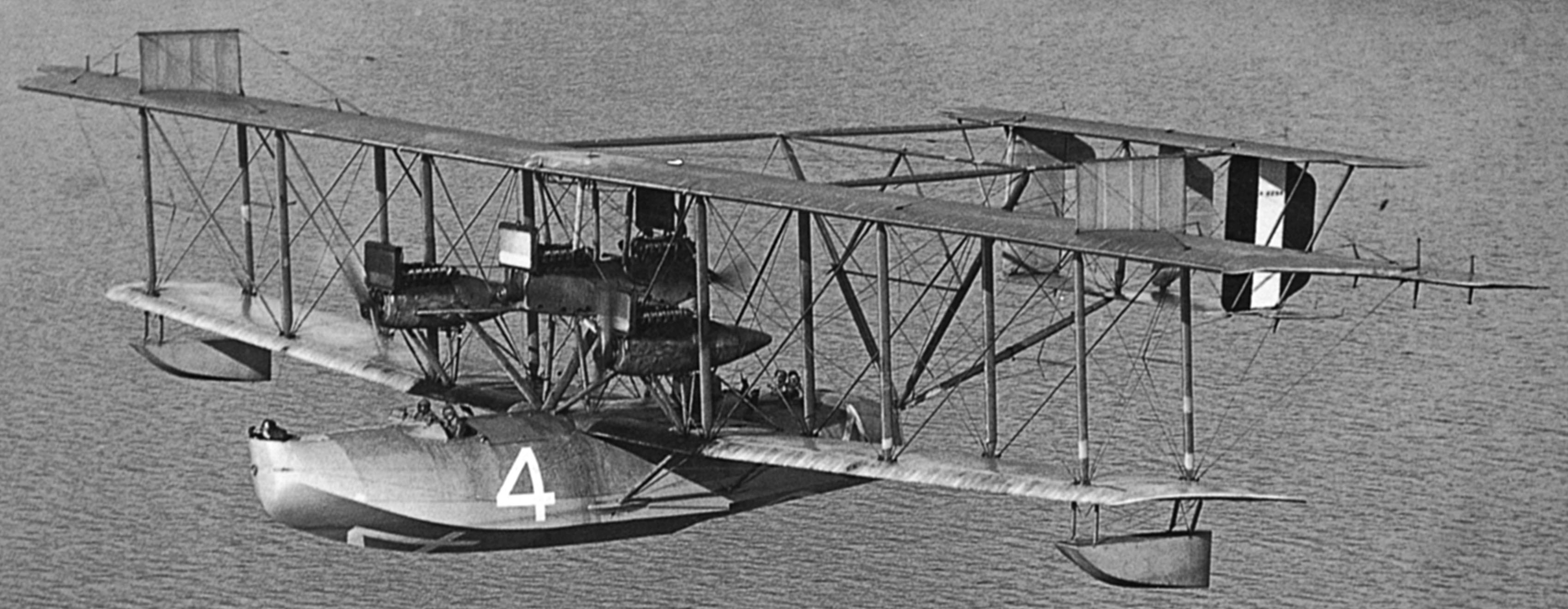
Wadsworth served as a plane guard for the 1919 transatlantic flight attempt by NC-4, a Curtiss NC flying boat.

On 31 December 1918, Wadsworth stood out of Brest to return to the United States and reached Boston, Massachusetts, on 9 January 1919. Following an extended overhaul, she put to sea on 1 May to serve as one of the picket ships stationed at intervals across the ocean for the transatlantic flight of four Curtiss NC flying boats, one of which, NC-4, successfully completed the feat. The destroyer returned home and operated on the east coast through the summer of 1919. On 29 August, Wadsworth was placed in reduced commission at Philadelphia where she remained almost two years. On 9 May 1921, the destroyer returned to active service along the east coast.

Just over a year later, on 3 June 1922, Wadsworth was decommissioned at the Philadelphia Navy Yard. The ship remained in reserve there until 7 January 1936 when her name was struck from the Naval Vessel Register. She was sold for scrapping on 30 June 1936 and was broken up the following August.

== Bibliography ==
- Gardiner, Robert; Gray, Randal, eds. (1985). Conway's All the World's Fighting Ships 1906–1921. Annapolis, Maryland: Naval Institute Press. ISBN 978-0-87021-907-8. OCLC 12119866.
