= USS Conyngham (DD-58) =

Tucker-class destroyer

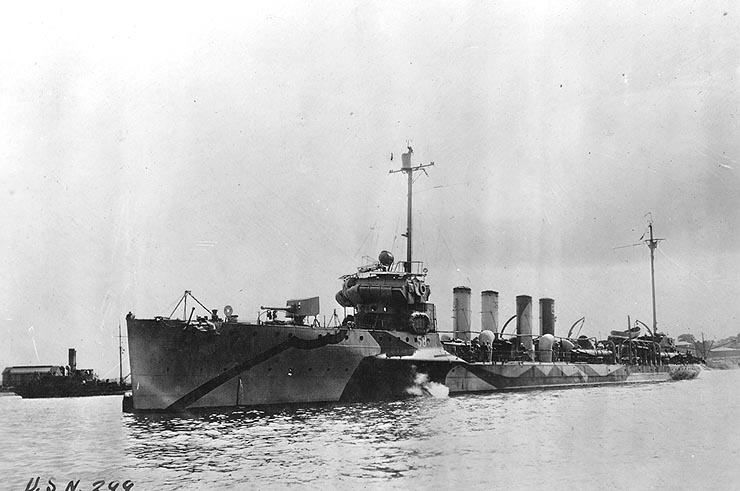
- Conyngham in pattern camouflage

History

United States
- Name: Conyngham
- Namesake: Gustavus Conyngham
- Ordered: 1913
- Builder: William Cramp & Sons; Philadelphia
- Yard number: 419
- Laid down: 27 July 1914
- Launched: 8 July 1915
- Sponsored by: Miss A. C. Stevens
- Commissioned: 21 January 1916
- Decommissioned: 23 June 1922
- Stricken: 5 July 1934
- Identification: Hull symbol:DD-58; Code letters:NJE
- Fate: transferred to U.S. Coast Guard, 7 June 1924

United States
- Name: Conyngham
- Acquired: 7 June 1924
- Commissioned: 8 March 1925, Cape May, New Jersey
- Decommissioned: 5 June 1933
- Identification: Hull symbol:CG-2
- Fate: Returned to U.S. Navy, 30 June 1933, Sold on 22 August 1934

General characteristics
- Class & type: Tucker-class destroyer
- Displacement: 1,090 long tons (1,110 t); 1,205 long tons (1,224 t) fully loaded
- Length: 315 ft 3 in (96.09 m)
- Beam: 30 ft 7 in (9.32 m)
- Draft: 9 ft 4 1/2 in (2.858 m) (mean); 10 ft 5 in (3.18 m) (max)
- Installed power: 4 × Yarrow boilers; 18,000 shp (13,000 kW)
- Propulsion: 2 × Curtis geared steam turbines; 2 × screw propellers
- Speed: 29.5 kn (33.9 mph; 54.6 km/h); 29.63 kn (34.10 mph; 54.87 km/h) (Speed on Trial)
- Complement: 5 officers 96 enlisted
- Armament: 4 × 4 in (100 mm)/50 caliber guns; 8 × 21 inch (533 mm) torpedo tubes (4 × 2)

USS Conyngham (Destroyer No. 58/DD-58) was a Tucker-class destroyer built for the United States Navy prior to the American entry into World War I. The ship was the first U.S. Navy vessel named for Gustavus Conyngham.

Conyngham was laid down by the William Cramp & Sons of Philadelphia, in July 1914 and launched in July of the following year. The ship was a little more than 315 feet (96 m) in length, just over 30 feet (9.1 m) abeam, and had a standard displacement of 1,090 long tons (1,110 t). She was armed with four 4-inch (10 cm) guns and had eight 21 inch (533 mm) torpedo tubes. Conyngham was powered by a pair of steam turbines that propelled her at up to 29.5 knots (54.6 km/h).

After her January 1916 commissioning, Conyngham sailed in the Atlantic and the Caribbean. After the United States entered World War I in April 1917, Conyngham was part of the first U.S. destroyer squadron sent overseas. Patrolling the Irish Sea out of Queenstown, Ireland, Conyngham made several rescues of passengers and crew from ships sunk by U-boats. Conyngham's commander was commended for actions related to what was thought at the time to be a "probable" kill of a German submarine.

Upon returning to the United States in December 1918, Conyngham underwent repairs at the Boston Navy Yard. She remained there in reduced commission through 1921, with only brief episodes of activity. After returning to active service for about a year, she was decommissioned in June 1922. In June 1924, Conyngham was transferred to the United States Coast Guard to help enforce Prohibition as a part of the "Rum Patrol". She operated under the name USCGC Conyngham (CG-2) until 1933, when she was returned to the Navy. Later that year, the ship was renamed DD-58 to free the name Conyngham for another destroyer. She was sold for scrap in August 1934.

== Design and construction ==
Conyngham was authorized in 1913 as the second ship of the Tucker class which, like the related O'Brien class, was an improved version of the Cassin-class destroyers authorized in 1911. Construction of the vessel was awarded to William Cramp & Sons of Philadelphia, which laid down her keel on 27 July 1914. Twelve months later, on 8 July 1915, Conyngham was launched by sponsor Miss A. C. Stevens, a great-great-granddaughter of the ship's namesake, Gustavus Conyngham (1744–1819), a Continental Navy officer. As built, Conyngham was 315 feet 3 inches (96.09 m) in length and 30 feet 6 inches (9.30 m) abeam and drew 9 feet 4 inches (2.84 m). The ship had a standard displacement of 1,090 long tons (1,110 t) and displaced 1,205 long tons (1,224 t) when fully loaded.

Conyngham had two Curtis steam turbines that drove her two screw propellers, and an additional steam turbine geared to one of the propeller shafts for cruising purposes. The power plant could generate 18,000 shaft horsepower (13,000 kW) and move the ship at speeds up to 29.5 knots (54.6 km/h).

Conyngham's main battery consisted of four 4-inch (102 mm)/50 Mark 9 guns, (Note: The 50 denotes the length of the gun barrels; in this case, the gun is 50 calibers, meaning that the gun is 50 times as long as it is in diameter, 200 inches (5.1 m) in this case. The Mark number is the version of the gun; in this case, the ninth U.S. Navy design of the 4-inch/50 gun.) with each gun weighing in excess of 6,100 pounds (2,800 kg). The guns fired 33-pound (15 kg) armor-piercing projectiles at 2,900 feet per second (880 m/s). At an elevation of 20°, the guns had a range of 15,920 yards (14,560 m).

Conyngham was also equipped with eight 21-inch (533 mm) torpedo tubes. The General Board of the United States Navy had called for two anti-aircraft guns for the Tucker-class ships, as well as provisions for laying up to 36 floating mines. From sources, it is unclear if these recommendations were followed for Conyngham or any of the other ships of the class.

== Early career ==
USS Conyngham was commissioned into the United States Navy on 21 January 1916. Following her commissioning, Conyngham joined in tactics and war maneuvers off the east coast in 1916 and in the beginning of 1917 sailed to the Caribbean for war games and fleet maneuvers. Returning to Norfolk, Virginia on 23 March, she joined 5th Naval District Patrol Force and with Wadsworth and Sampson patrolled the approaches to Chesapeake Bay.

== World War I ==
On 24 April 1917 Conyngham sailed from Boston, Massachusetts with her division for Queenstown, Ireland, the first destroyers to join English forces for duty after the entry of the United States into World War I earlier that month. This force patrolled off the Irish coast and escorted convoys through the danger zone where German submarine operated.

The destroyers also providing rescue services for stricken ships. When the British ship Karina was torpedoed and sunk by German submarine UC-75 on 17 August 1917, Conyngham sped to her assistance and rescued 39 survivors. A similar distress call from the British ship Hartland on 22 November—torpedoed by German submarine U-97—resulted in the rescue of her 30-man crew by Conyngham.

The British Armed merchant cruiser Orama and ten destroyers, including Conyngham, were escorting an eastbound convoy of twenty steamers on 19 October, when German submarine U-62 surfaced in the midst of the group. The submarine launched its only remaining torpedo at Orama, sinking that vessel. Lookouts on Conyngham saw U-62's periscope and quickly launched a depth charge attack on the spot where the U-boat had submerged, bringing oil and debris to the surface. Conyngham's commanding officer was commended for his prompt and effective action, and the British Admiralty awarded Conyngham a "probable" kill on the submarine. Unfortunately for Conyngham's record, though, U-62 had survived the encounter.

== Post-war ==
After the hostilities had ended on 11 November 1918 with Germany signing the Armistice, Conyngham sailed from Queenstown on 14 December 1918 for Boston to have an overhaul. From February to April 1919, the destroyer participated in fleet exercises and division maneuvers in the Caribbean. Returning to Boston, she was placed in reduced commission until 1921.

In June 1921, Conyngham accompanied a Cuban warship that was repatriating the remains of former Cuban President José Miguel Gómez to Havana. She returned to Newport, Rhode Island, for summer exercises with her squadron and, after wintering at Charleston, South Carolina, reported to Philadelphia Navy Yard in March 1922 for inactivation. She was decommissioned there on 23 June 1922.

== United States Coast Guard career ==
On 17 January 1920, Prohibition was instituted by law in the United States. Soon, the smuggling of alcoholic beverages along the coastlines of the United States became widespread and blatant. The Treasury Department eventually determined that the United States Coast Guard simply did not have the ships to constitute a successful patrol. To cope with the problem, President Calvin Coolidge in 1924 authorized the transfer from the Navy to the Coast Guard of twenty old destroyers that were in reserve and out of commission. Conyngham was reactivated and transferred to the Treasury Department on 7 June 1924 for use by the Coast Guard. Designated CG-2, Conyngham was commissioned on 8 March 1925, and joined the "Rum Patrol" to aid in the attempt to enforce prohibition laws.

After the United States Congress proposed the Twenty-first Amendment to end prohibition in February 1933, plans were made for Conyngham to be returned to the Navy. On 27 May 1933, Conyngham arrived at the Philadelphia Navy Yard, and was decommissioned nine days later, on 5 June. Conyngham was transferred back to the Navy on 30 June. Later in 1933, the ship was renamed DD-58 in order to free the name Conyngham for a new destroyer of the same name. DD-58 remained in noncommissioned status until struck from the Naval Vessel Register on 5 July 1934. She was sold for scrap on 22 August in accordance with the London Naval Treaty.

== Bibliography ==
- Gardiner, Robert; Gray, Randal, eds. (1985). Conway's All the World's Fighting Ships 1906–1921. Annapolis, Maryland: Naval Institute Press. ISBN 978-0-87021-907-8. OCLC 12119866.
- Gibson, R. H.; Maurice Prendergast (2003) [1931]. The German Submarine War, 1914–1918. Annapolis, Maryland: Naval Institute Press. ISBN 9781591143147. OCLC 52924732.
- Naval History & Heritage Command. "Conyngham". Dictionary of American Naval Fighting Ships. Navy Department, Naval History and Heritage Command.
- Naval History & Heritage Command. "Tucker". Dictionary of American Naval Fighting Ships. Navy Department, Naval History & Heritage Command.
