= SM U-62 =

German submarine

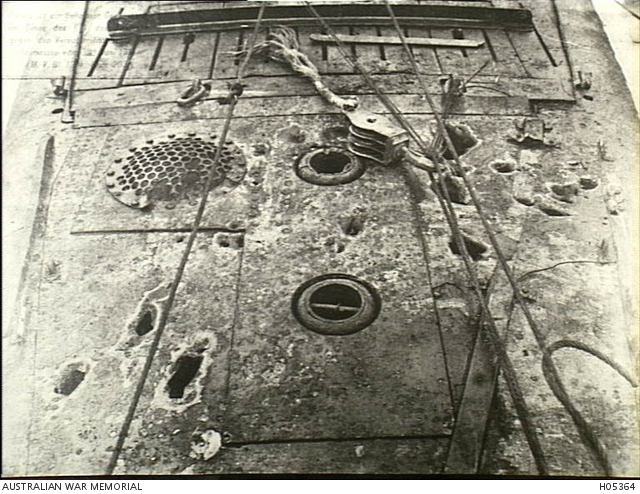
- Battle damage to the deck of German submarine U62 - Oct 31 1917

History

German Empire
- Name: U-62
- Ordered: 6 October 1914
- Builder: AG Weser, Bremen
- Yard number: 217
- Laid down: 22 June 1915
- Launched: 2 August 1916
- Commissioned: 30 December 1916
- Fate: 22 November 1918 - Surrendered. Broken up at Bo'ness in 1919-20

General characteristics
- Class & type: Type U 57 submarine
- Displacement: 768 t (756 long tons) surfaced; 956 t (941 long tons) submerged
- Length: 67.00 m (219 ft 10 in) (o/a); 54.02 m (177 ft 3 in) (pressure hull)
- Beam: 6.32 m (20 ft 9 in) (oa); 4.05 m (13 ft 3 in) (pressure hull)
- Height: 8.05 m (26 ft 5 in)
- Draught: 3.79 m (12 ft 5 in)
- Installed power: 2 × 2,400 PS (1,765 kW; 2,367 shp) surfaced; 2 × 1,200 PS (883 kW; 1,184 shp) submerged
- Propulsion: 2 shafts
- Speed: 16.5 knots (30.6 km/h; 19.0 mph) surfaced; 8.4 knots (15.6 km/h; 9.7 mph) submerged
- Range: 11,400 nmi (21,100 km; 13,100 mi) at 8 knots (15 km/h; 9.2 mph) surfaced; 49 nmi (91 km; 56 mi) at 5 knots (9.3 km/h; 5.8 mph) submerged
- Test depth: 50 m (164 ft 1 in)
- Complement: 36
- Armament: 4 × 50 cm (19.7 in) torpedo tubes (two bow, two stern); 7 torpedoes; 1 × 10.5 cm (4.1 in) SK L/45 deck gun

Service record
- Part of: II Flotilla; 15 February 1917 – 11 November 1918
- Commanders: Kptlt. Ernst Hashagen; 30 December 1916 – 24 December 1917; Kptlt. Otto Wiebalck; 25 December 1917 – 9 March 1918; Kptlt. Ernst Hashagen; 10 March – 11 November 1918
- Operations: 9 patrols
- Victories: 45 merchant ships sunk (109,117 GRT); 2 warships sunk (10,767 tons); 1 auxiliary warship sunk (12,927 GRT); 5 merchant ships damaged (16,483 GRT)

SM U-62 was one of the 329 submarines serving in the Imperial German Navy in World War I. U-62 was engaged in the naval warfare and took part in the First Battle of the Atlantic.

On 8 March 1917, SM U-62 sank the coal freighter Storstad, the ship that had rammed and sunk the RMS Empress of Ireland ocean liner in one of the deadliest peacetime maritime disasters in modern history.

On 7 August 1918, she torpedoed the French armoured cruiser Dupetit-Thouars, which sank with the loss of 13 of her crew.

== Summary of raiding history ==
| Date | Name | Nationality | Tonnage (Note: Merchant ship tonnages are in gross register tons. Military vessels are listed by tons displacement.) | Fate |
|---|---|---|---|---|
| 8 March 1917 | Storstad | Norway | 6,028 | Sunk |
| 8 March 1917 | Vega | Russia | 452 | Sunk |
| 10 March 1917 | Marie | France | 127 | Sunk |
| 11 March 1917 | Thrift | United Kingdom | 40 | Sunk |
| 12 March 1917 | Algonquin | United States | 1,806 | Sunk |
| 12 March 1917 | Collingwood | Norway | 1,042 | Sunk |
| 12 March 1917 | Jules Gommes | France | 2,595 | Sunk |
| 13 March 1917 | Dag | Sweden | 250 | Sunk |
| 14 March 1917 | Rose Lea | United Kingdom | 2,830 | Sunk |
| 23 March 1917 | Tres Fratres | Netherlands | 297 | Sunk |
| 27 April 1917 | Dunmore Head | United Kingdom | 2,293 | Sunk |
| 27 April 1917 | Inveramsay | United Kingdom | 1,438 | Sunk |
| 30 April 1917 | Fortunata | Italy | 3,348 | Sunk |
| 30 April 1917 | HMS Tulip | Royal Navy | 1,250 | Sunk |
| 3 May 1917 | Frederick Knight | United Kingdom | 3,604 | Sunk |
| 4 May 1917 | Jörgen Olsen | Denmark | 310 | Damaged |
| 7 May 1917 | Polamhall | United Kingdom | 4,010 | Sunk |
| 10 May 1917 | Berangere | France | 2,851 | Sunk |
| 10 May 1917 | Gazelle | Norway | 288 | Sunk |
| 13 June 1917 | Candace | Norway | 395 | Sunk |
| 13 June 1917 | Sylvia | Norway | 148 | Sunk |
| 16 June 1917 | Kornsø | Denmark | 115 | Sunk |
| 20 June 1917 | Bengore Head | United Kingdom | 2,490 | Sunk |
| 21 June 1917 | Lord Roberts | United Kingdom | 4,166 | Sunk |
| 24 June 1917 | South Wales | United Kingdom | 3,668 | Sunk |
| 25 June 1917 | Guildhall | United Kingdom | 2,609 | Sunk |
| 26 June 1917 | Gorsemore | United Kingdom | 3,079 | Damaged |
| 26 June 1917 | Cattaro | United Kingdom | 2,908 | Sunk |
| 26 June 1917 | Manistee | United Kingdom | 3,869 | Sunk |
| 10 August 1917 | Orion I | Norway | 322 | Sunk |
| 15 August 1917 | Albertha | Denmark | 170 | Sunk |
| 24 August 1917 | Henriette | France | 2,005 | Sunk |
| 30 August 1917 | Eastern Prince | United Kingdom | 2,885 | Sunk |
| 30 August 1917 | Grelhame | United Kingdom | 3,740 | Sunk |
| 30 August 1917 | Noya | United Kingdom | 4,282 | Sunk |
| 13 October 1917 | Woodburn | United Kingdom | 2,360 | Damaged |
| 17 October 1917 | Adams | United Kingdom | 2,223 | Sunk |
| 17 October 1917 | Antilles | United States | 6,878 | Sunk |
| 18 October 1917 | Madura | United Kingdom | 4,484 | Sunk |
| 19 October 1917 | J. L. Luckenbach | United States | 4,920 | Damaged |
| 19 October 1917 | HMS Orama | Royal Navy | 12,927 | Sunk |
| 11 December 1917 | Oldfield Grange | United Kingdom | 4,653 | Sunk |
| 14 December 1917 | Hare | United Kingdom | 774 | Sunk |
| 15 December 1917 | Formby | United Kingdom | 1,282 | Sunk |
| 17 December 1917 | Coningbeg | United Kingdom | 1,279 | Sunk |
| 16 May 1918 | Heron Bridge | United Kingdom | 2,422 | Sunk |
| 16 May 1918 | Llancarvan | United Kingdom | 4,749 | Sunk |
| 24 May 1918 | Ruth Hickman | United Kingdom | 417 | Sunk |
| 27 May 1918 | Merionethshire | United Kingdom | 4,308 | Sunk |
| 28 May 1918 | Cairnross | United Kingdom | 4,016 | Sunk |
| 30 May 1918 | Ausonia | United Kingdom | 8,153 | Sunk |
| 7 August 1918 | Dupetit-Thouars | French Navy | 9,517 | Sunk |
| 7 August 1918 | Lorna | Norway | 3,286 | Sunk |
| 8 August 1918 | Westward Ho | United States | 5,814 | Damaged |

== Bibliography ==
- Gröner, Erich; Jung, Dieter; Maass, Martin (1991). U-boats and Mine Warfare Vessels. German Warships 1815–1945. Vol. 2. Translated by Thomas, Keith; Magowan, Rachel. London: Conway Maritime Press. ISBN 0-85177-593-4.
