= Ager =

Ager or AGER may refer to:

- Ager (surname)

== Places ==
- Ager (river), a river in Upper Austria
- Àger, a municipality in Catalonia, Spain
- Viscounty of Àger, a medieval Catalan jurisdiction that branched off the County of Urgell
- Ager, California, unincorporated community
- Ager Romanus, Latin term for the territory surrounding and outside the city of Rome

== Other ==
- A US Navy hull classification symbol: Environmental research ship (AGER), actually a signals intelligence collection vessel
- AGER, an alternate name for the protein RAGE (receptor)

== See also ==
- Agir (disambiguation)
- Aegir (disambiguation)
- Agar (disambiguation)
