= Agir =

Agir or AGIR may refer to:

- Agir (singer), Portuguese singer
- AGIR (student organization), Galician independence group
- Agir (Belgium), Belgian political party
- Agir (Brazil), Brazilian political party
- Agir (France), French political party
- Agir ensemble, French parliamentary group
- Réseau AGIR, French World War II espionage group
- AGIR General Association of Engineers of Romania
- SMS Ägir, Imperial German ship
- Aqel, also known as Agir, a village in East Azerbaijan Province, Iran
- Bingham Agir, Nauruan politician
- David Agir (1942–2003), Nauruan politician

== See also ==
- Ægir (disambiguation)
- Agar (disambiguation)
- Ager (disambiguation)
