= USS Conyngham =

USS Conyngham may refer to one of these United States Navy ships named in honor of Gustavus Conyngham:

- USS Conyngham (DD-58), a Tucker-class destroyer, commissioned in 1915, served in World War I, decommissioned in 1922, transferred to the United States Coast Guard as CG-3, returned to the Navy and scrapped in 1934
- USS Conyngham (DD-371), a Mahan-class destroyer, commissioned in 1936, served in World War II and decommissioned in 1946
- USS Conyngham (DDG-17), a Charles F. Adams-class guided missile destroyer, commissioned in 1963 and decommissioned in 1990
