= Agar-Ellis =

Agar-Ellis is a surname, and may refer to:

- George Agar-Ellis, 1st Baron Dover (1797–1833), English man of letters
- Henry Agar-Ellis, 3rd Viscount Clifden (1825–1866), Irish courtier and race horse owner

== See also ==
- Agar (disambiguation)
- Ellis
