= Augur (disambiguation) =

An augur is a public official in ancient Rome.

Augur may also refer to:

== People ==
- Christopher C. Augur (1821–1898), American Civil War officer
- Helen Augur (died 1969), American journalist
- Hezekiah Augur (1791–1858), American sculptor and inventor
- Ruth Monro Augur (1886 - 1967), American artist, educator and suffragist
- Jean Augur (1934–1993), British teacher and dyslexia activist

== Fiction ==
- Augur, the eighth month of the fictional Zork calendar
- Augur, a fictional weapon from the Resistance: Fall of Man video game
- Augur, a kind of magic user in James Islington’s Licanius Trilogy

== Other uses ==
- Augur (software), a decentralized prediction market built using Ethereum
- Augur buzzard, an African bird of prey
- Augur (caste), a sub-group of the Jogi caste in India
- Eugene Augur, a countercultural underground newspaper published 1969–1974
- Tallinna JK Augur, football club in Estonia

== See also ==
- Agar (disambiguation)
- Auger (disambiguation)
