= Ager (surname) =

Ager is an Anglo Saxon and Danish surname, and it derived from the given name Agar. Notable people with the surname include:

- Andrew Ager (born 1962), Canadian composer
- Cecelia Ager (1902–1981), American film critic
- Christina Ager (born 1995), Austrian Alpine skier
- Deborah Ager, American poet
- John Ager (born 1949), American politician
- Klaus Ager (born 1946), Austrian composer and conductor
- Maurice Ager (born 1984), American basketball player
- Maria Ager, Austrian chess master
- Milton Ager (1893–1979), American pianist and composer
- Nikolaus Ager (1568–1634), French botanist born in Alsace
- Simon Ager (born 1970), British linguist and author of the online encyclopaedia Omniglot
- Waldemar Ager (1869–1941), Norwegian-American newspaperman and author

== Fictional characters ==
- Captain Ager and Lady Ager, characters in the 1617 play A Fair Quarrel
- William Ager, chief antagonist in M R James' 1925 ghost story A Warning to the Curious

== See also ==
- Wendy Ager-Grant (born 1953), British fencer
- Christen Ager-Hanssen (born 1962), Norwegian Internet entrepreneur & venture capitalist
