= Aegir (disambiguation) =

Ægir (also Æger) is a figure in Norse mythology.

Aegir, AEgir, Ægir or Æger may also refer to:

== Science ==
=== Astronomy ===
- Aegir (moon), a moon of Saturn
- Ægir (planet) or Epsilon Eridani b, an exoplanet

=== Other uses in science ===
- Aeger, a genus of fossil shrimp
- Aegir, another name for aegirine, a type of silicate mineral
- Aegir, another name for a tidal bore
  - Trent Aegir, the tidal bore on the River Trent
- Aegir Ridge, an extinct mid-ocean ridge in the far-northern Atlantic Ocean

== Ships ==
- Ægir-class offshore patrol vessel, a class serving the Icelandic Coast Guard
- Aegir-class submarine tender, a former class of ships in the US Navy
- DCV Aegir, a 2013 large offshore construction vessel being built for Heerema Marine Contractors
- HNoMS Æger, name of several ships in the Royal Norwegian Navy
- ICGV Ægir, offshore patrol vessel of the Icelandic Coast Guard
- SMS Ägir, coastal defense ships of the Imperial German Navy
- USS Aegir (AS-23), a 1943 former US submarine tender

== Other uses ==
- Aegir, the name of a member of the Asgard race in the science fiction TV show Stargate
- G.S.R. Aegir, a student rowing club in Groningen, the Netherlands
- Knattspyrnufélagið Ægir, a football club based in Þorlákshöfn, Iceland

== See also ==
- Agir (disambiguation)
- Ager (disambiguation)
