= Auger =

Auger may refer to:

- Earth auger, a drilling tool used for making holes in the ground
- Wood auger, a device to drill wood or other materials
- Auger bit, a drill bit
- Plumber's snake, or drain auger, used to dislodge clogs in plumbing
- Auger (surname), including a list of people with the name
- Auger Hill, in Antarctica

== See also ==
- Augur (disambiguation)
- Agar (disambiguation)
- Pierre Auger Observatory, an international cosmic ray observatory
- Auger effect, or Meitner–Auger effect, a physical phenomenon in which atoms eject electrons
  - Auger electron spectroscopy, an analytical technique using the Auger effect
  - Auger therapy, a radiation therapy for the treatment of cancer
- Air shower (physics), or Auger shower, named for Pierre Auger
- Terebridae, auger shells or auger snails, a family of predatory marine gastropods
- Screw conveyor, or auger conveyor, a mechanism that uses a rotating helical screw blade
