= Elie Radu =

Romanian Engineer

- Born: April 20, 1853; Botoșani, Moldavia
- Died: 10 October 1931 (aged 78); Bucharest, Kingdom of Romania
- Resting place: Bellu Cemetery, Bucharest
- Education: Academia Mihăileană; Université libre de Bruxelles
- Occupations: Civil engineer, academic
- Years active: 1877–1929
- Employer(s): Ministry of Public Works; School of Bridges and Roads, Mines and Architecture; Politehnica University of Bucharest
- Notable work: Bragadiru water supply network for Bucharest; Târgu Ocna – Comănești – Palanca railway
- Children: Mircea (son)

Elie Radu (April 20, 1853 – October 10, 1931) was a distinguished Romanian civil engineer and academic. Over a span of some 50 years he completed over 60 major projects, constructing railways, roads, bridges, public buildings, and civic facilities. He was also a university professor, served as president of the Romanian Association of Engineers, and was elected honorary member of the Romanian Academy.

== Early years ==
He was born in Botoșani, Moldavia, the son of a tax collector who was mayor of the city for 10 years. After completing elementary school and gymnasium in Botoșani, he went to study at the Academia Mihăileană in Iași, and then in 1872 to Brussels, where he studied engineering at the École polytechnique, obtaining his diploma in 1877.

== Projects ==
=== Railways and train stations ===
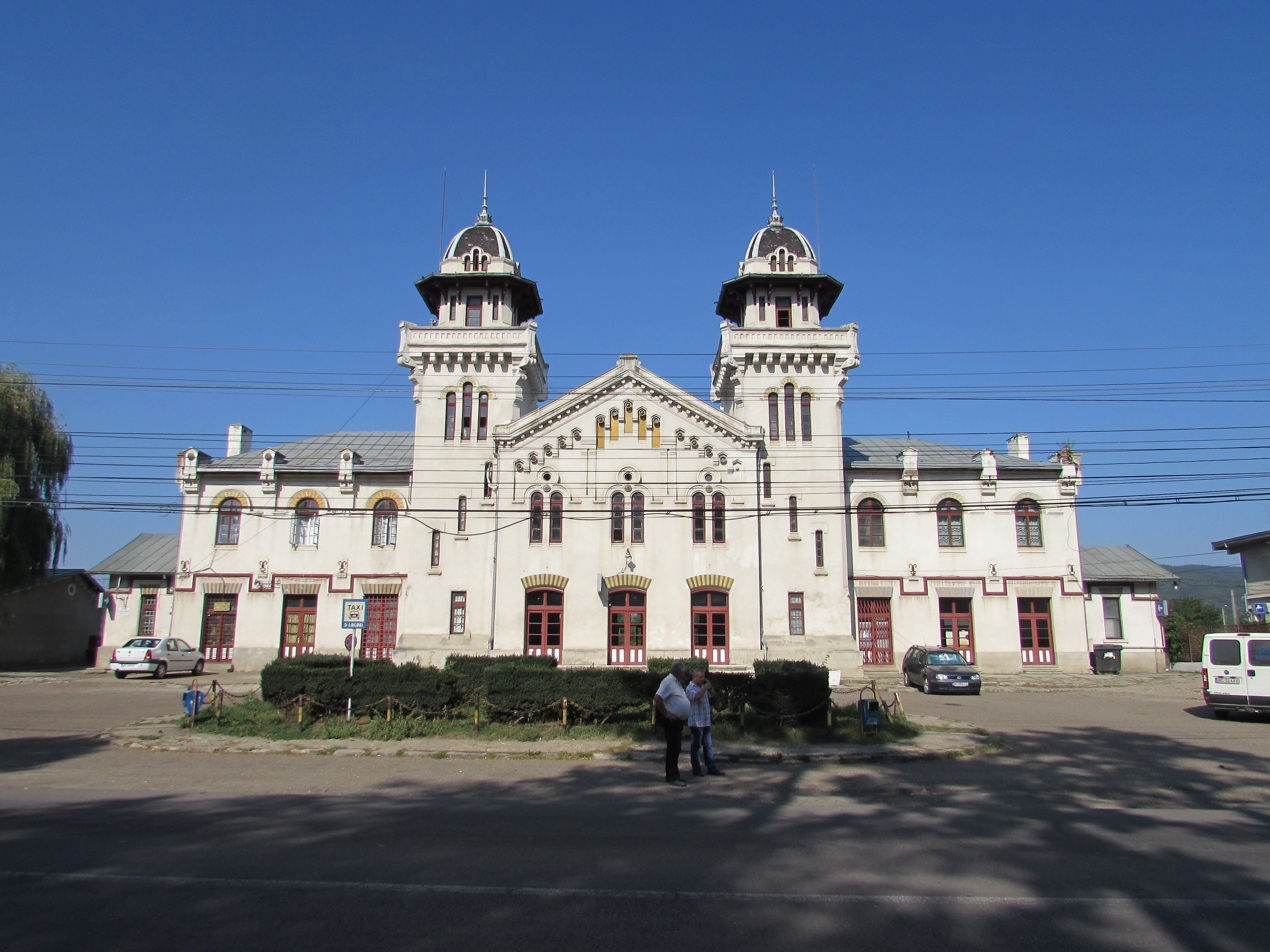
Comănești train station

Upon returning to Romania, he found employment with the Ministry of Public Works, and worked with engineer Anghel Saligny on the construction of the Ploiești–Predeal rail line. He went on to design and build over 475 km (295 mi) of railway lines, and design an additional 175 km (109 mi) of tracks — a substantial portion of the rail network of Căile Ferate Române at the time. In 1898–1899 he built the Curtea de Argeș and Comănești train stations, based on plans drawn by Italian architect Giulio Magni, inspired by the design of the Lausanne railway station. In the aftermath of World War I and the Union of Transylvania with Romania, Radu helped build new roads and railways across the Carpathian mountain passes, the most important one being the Târgu Ocna–Comănești–Palanca rail line.

=== Civil works ===
Named in 1887 chief of civil works for the city of Bucharest, he built in the next two years an underground water collection station in Bragadiru, feeding into a filtration unit in Grozăvești. This was the first water supply network for the capital city, and its design was unique in Europe at the time. Together with a fellow engineer, Dimitrie Leonida, Radu made in 1909–1910 the first proposals for a metro system in Bucharest.

=== Public buildings ===
Bucharest City Hall

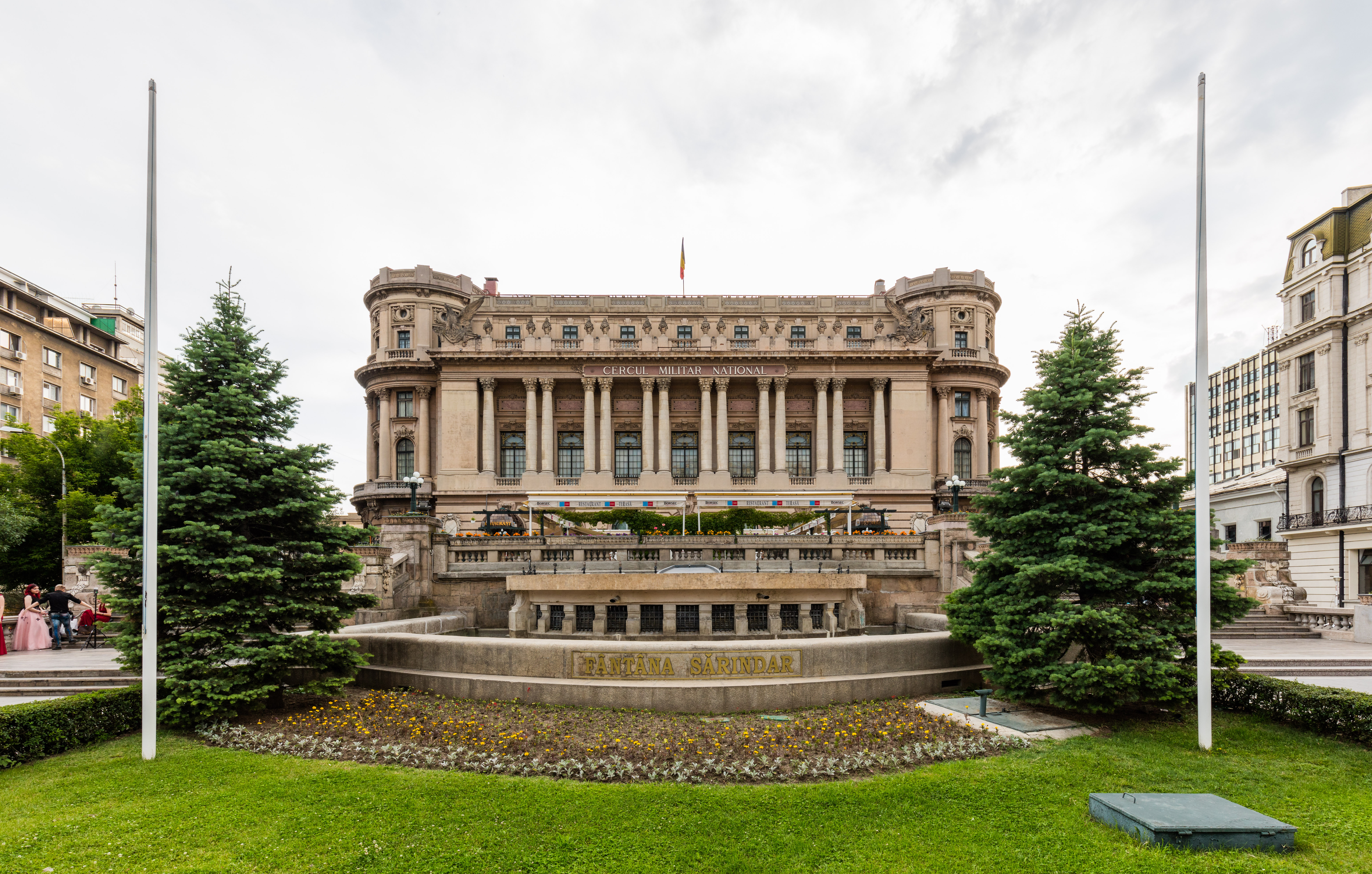
Palace of the National Military Circle

In 1906–1910 he supervised the construction of the Palace of the Ministry of Public Works, which was designed by architect Petre Antonescu. Built with a foundation made of reinforced concrete screed 1 m (39 in) thick, and with reinforced concrete floors, the building now houses the Bucharest City Hall. With chief architect Dimitrie Maimarolu, engineers Anghel and Paul Saligny, and his son, Mircea Radu, he built the Palace of the National Military Circle in downtown Bucharest.

== Academic career ==
In 1894 Radu was named professor at the School of Bridges and Roads, Mines and Architecture in Bucharest. In 1897–1898 and 1903–1904 he served as president of the General Association of Engineers of Romania. Starting in 1920 he taught at the newly founded Politehnica University of Bucharest. He was elected honorary member of the Romanian Academy in June 1926, and retired on January 1, 1930.

He died in Bucharest in 1931 and was buried in the city's Bellu Cemetery.

== Legacy ==
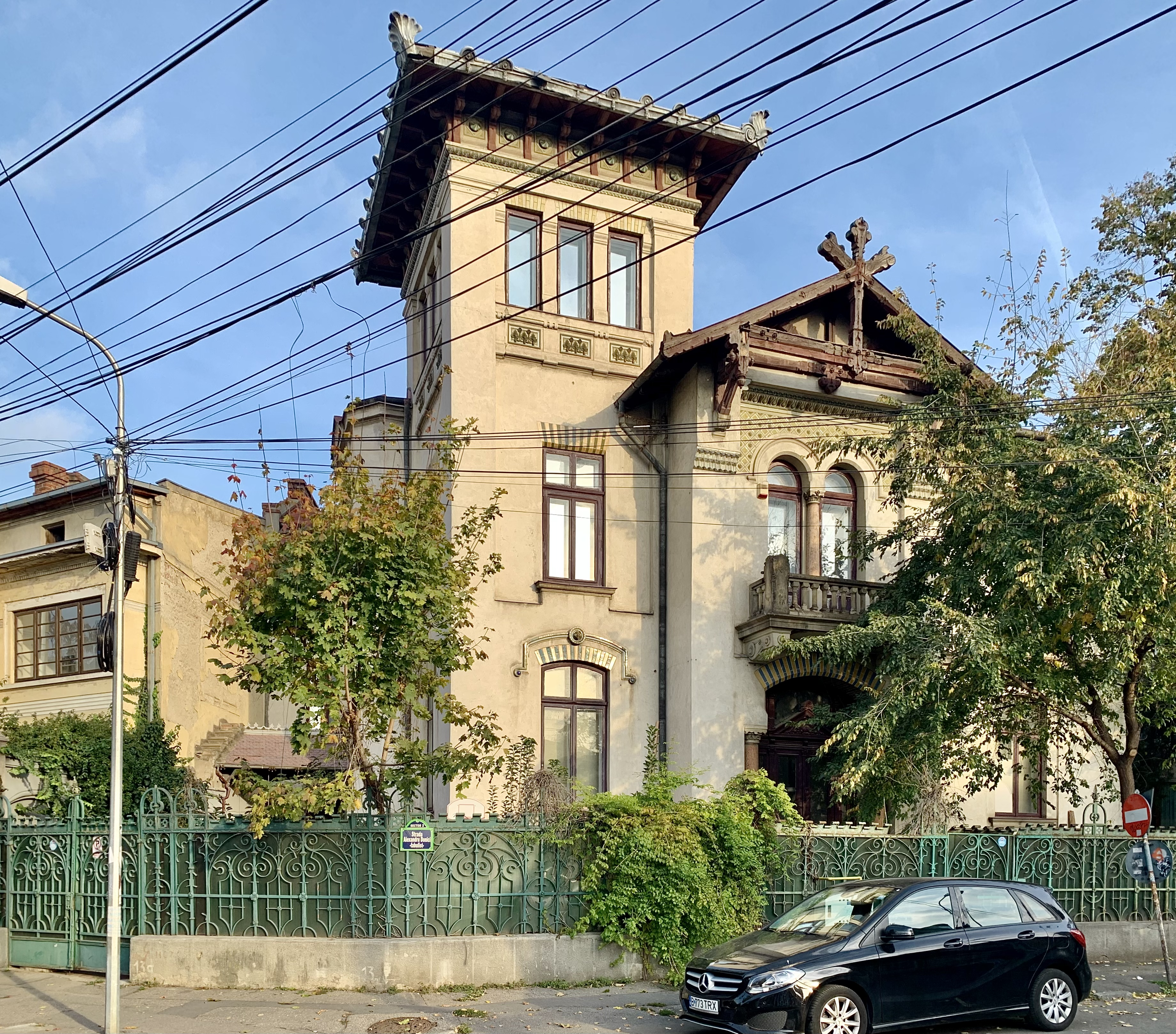
The Elie Radu House, on Strada Donici Alexandru

A street in Bucharest (running by City Hall, from the Cișmigiu Gardens to the Dâmbovița River) bears his name. Technical high schools in Bucharest, Ploiești, and Botoșani are also named after him. The house where he lived next to Grădina Icoanei was designed by Giulio Magni; it has been designated a historic monument, and currently houses a bistro.
