= USS Conyngham (DDG-17) =

Charles F. Adams-class destroyer

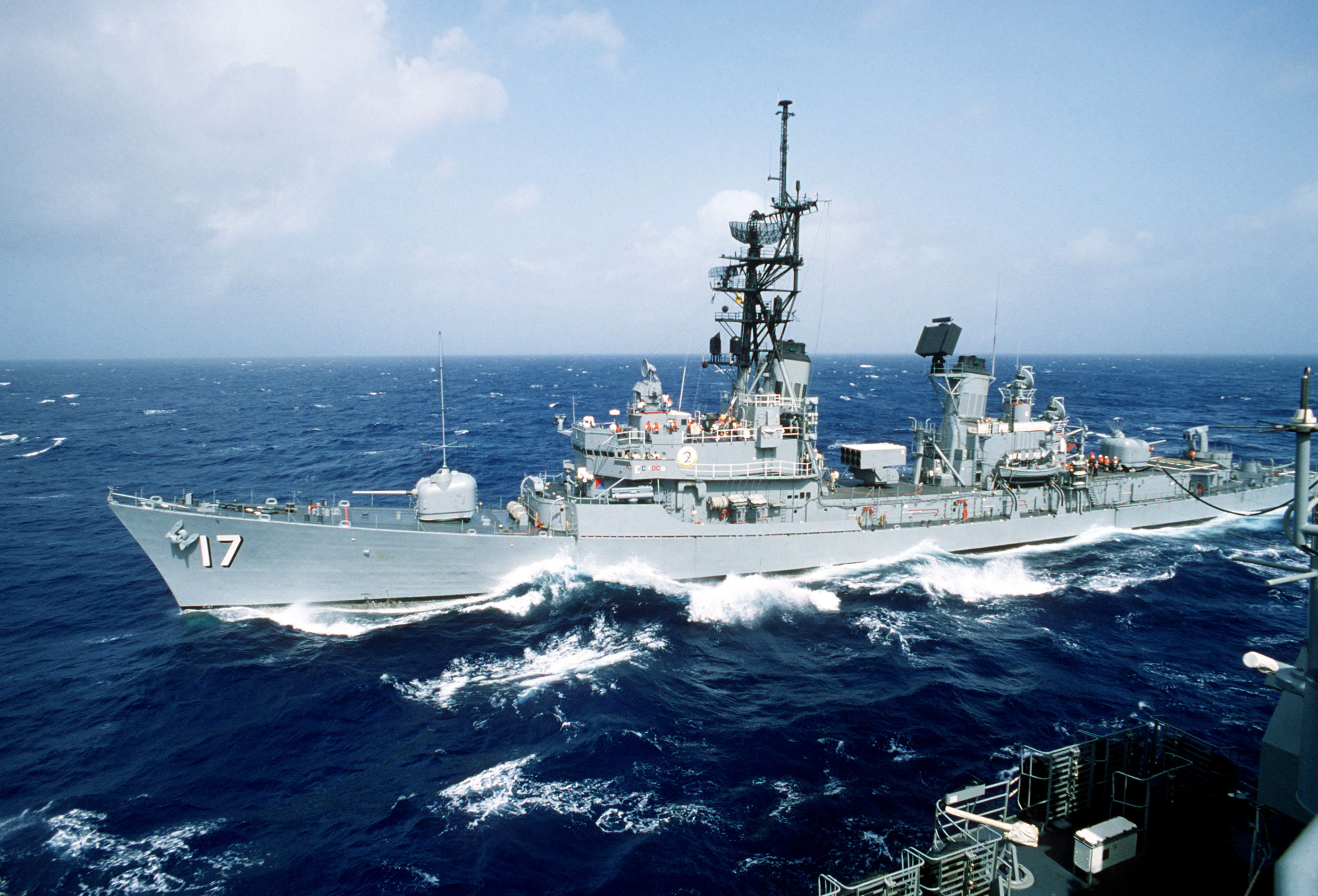
- USS Conyngham on 1 August 1984

History

United States
- Name: Conyngham
- Namesake: Gustavus Conyngham
- Ordered: 21 July 1959
- Builder: New York Shipbuilding Corporation
- Laid down: 1 May 1961
- Launched: 18 May 1962
- Acquired: 1 July 1963
- Commissioned: 13 July 1963
- Decommissioned: 30 October 1990
- Stricken: 30 May 1991
- Identification: Callsign: NHLT; Hull number: DDG-17
- Motto: Ready to Serve
- Fate: Scrapped, 15 April 1994

General characteristics
- Class & type: Charles F. Adams-class destroyer
- Displacement: 3,277 tons standard, 4,526 full load
- Length: 437 ft (133 m)
- Beam: 47 ft (14 m)
- Draft: 15 ft (4.6 m)
- Propulsion: 2 × General Electric steam turbines providing 70,000 shp (52 MW); 2 shafts; 4 × Combustion Engineering 1,275 psi (8,790 kPa) boilers
- Speed: 33 knots (61 km/h; 38 mph)
- Range: 4,500 nautical miles (8,300 km) at 20 knots (37 km/h)
- Complement: 354 (24 officers, 330 enlisted)
- Sensors & processing systems: AN/SPS-39 3D air search radar; AN/SPS-10 surface search radar; AN/SPG-51 missile fire control radar; AN/SPG-53 gunfire control radar; AN/SQS-23 Sonar and the hull mounted SQQ-23 Pair Sonar for DDG-2 through 19; AN/SPS-40 Air Search Radar
- Armament: 1 Mk 11 missile launcher (DDG2-14) or Mk 13 single arm missile launcher (DDG-15-24) for RIM-24 Tartar SAM system, or later the RIM-66 Standard (SM-1) and Harpoon antiship missile; 2 × 5"/54 caliber Mark 42 (127 mm) gun; 1 × RUR-5 ASROC Launcher; 6 × 12.8 in (324 mm) ASW Torpedo Tubes (2 x Mark 32 Surface Vessel Torpedo Tubes)

USS Conyngham (DDG-17), the third ship named for Captain Gustavus Conyngham, USN (1744–1819), was a Charles F. Adams-class guided-missile armed destroyer in the United States Navy.

Conyngham was laid down by the New York Shipbuilding Corporation at Camden, New Jersey, on 1 May 1961, launched on 19 May 1962 by Mrs. Carl B. Albert, wife of Representative Albert of Oklahoma, House Majority Leader, and commissioned on 13 June 1963.

== History ==
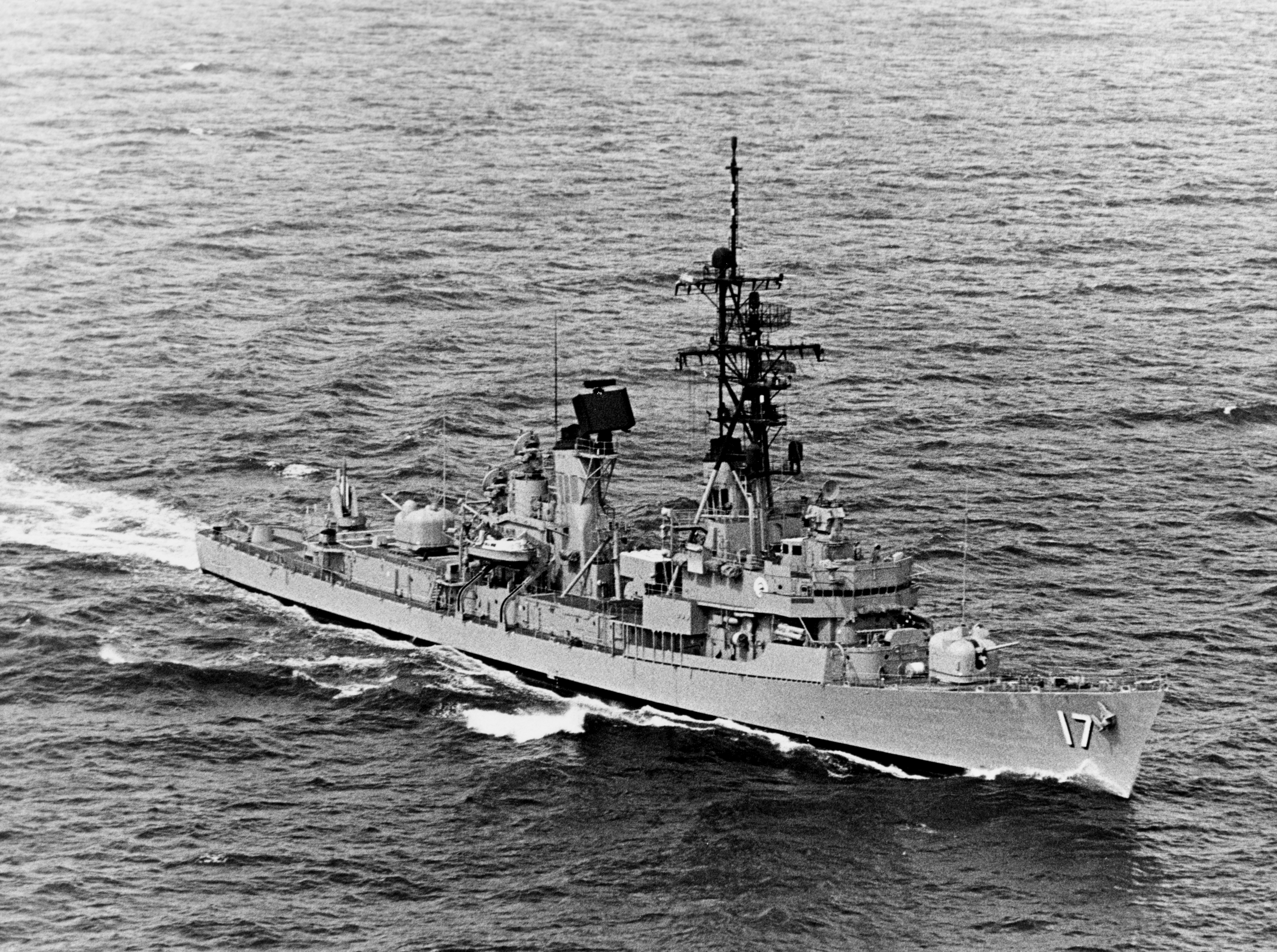
Conyngham underway in Hampton Roads on 22 April 1975

Conyngham was one of a few warships with shamrocks on her stacks (USS Coral Sea (CV-43), USS The Sullivans (DD-537), and others for example). During her 27 years of commissioned service, Conyngham lived up to her motto, Ready to Serve. Her presence exerted a powerful influence during times of crisis and helped maintain peace as a component of NATO seapower throughout the Cold War period. Conyngham made 15 Mediterranean deployments—three to the Persian Gulf, seven to Northern Europe, and 11 to the Caribbean. She distinguished herself during crises in Cyprus (1964, 1974); provided air cover for planes evacuating Americans from an insurrection in Amman, Jordan (1970); took part in contingency operations during the Arab-Israeli Yom Kippur War (1973); was the escort combatant during the evacuation of Americans from Beirut, Lebanon (1976); and conducted Black Sea Freedom of Navigation operations (1979).

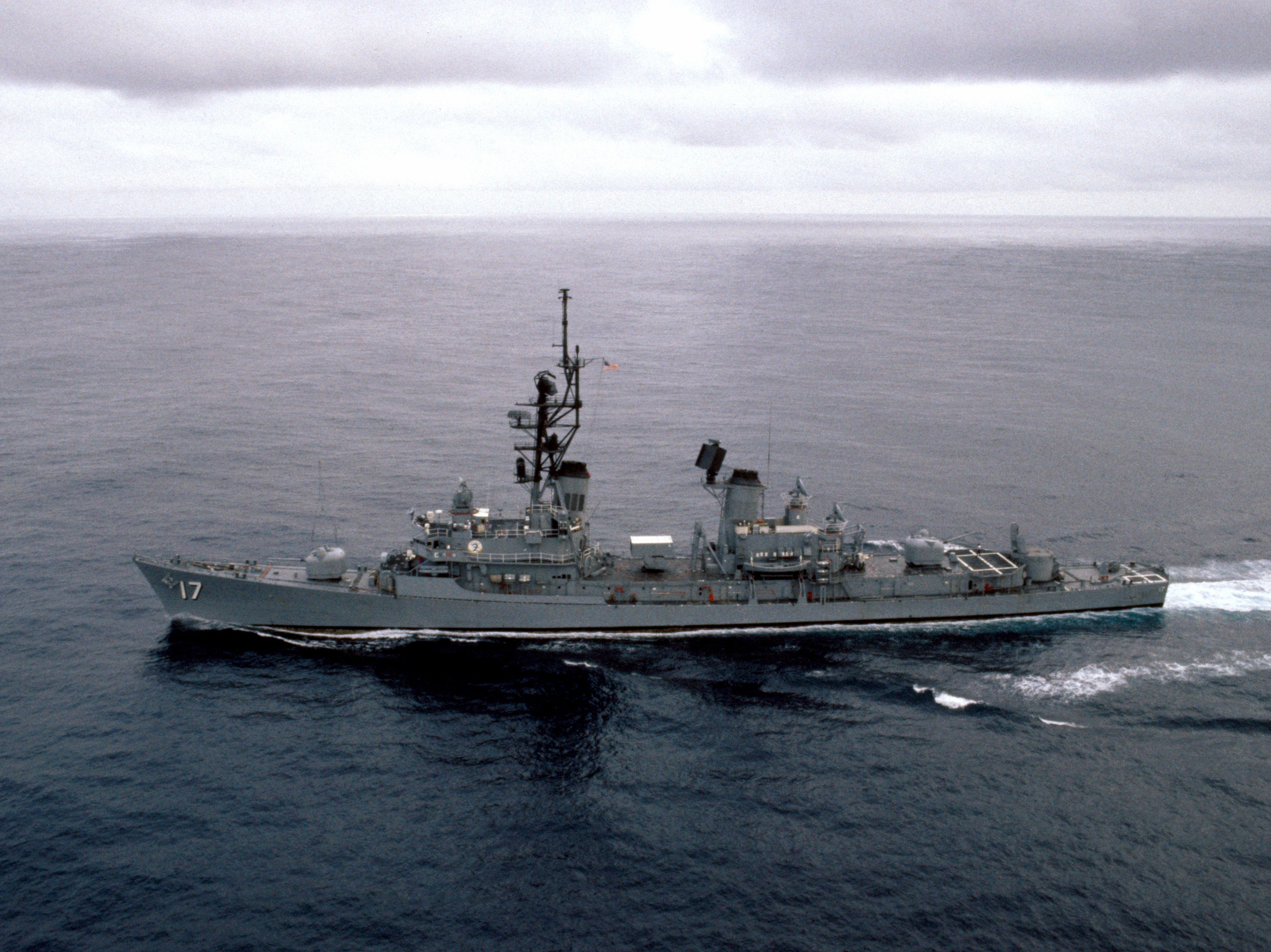
Conyngham underway in 1984

During the 1980s, Conyngham continued to support U.S. foreign policy when she served off the coast of Libya (1982); was awarded the Navy Expeditionary Medal for providing naval gunfire support of Marines stationed in, and off the coast of, Beirut, Lebanon (1983); and monitored maritime traffic off the coast of Nicaragua (1983). She sailed with the USS America (CV-66) Battle Group in support of U.S. intervention forces in Grenada (1983). While deployed to the Caribbean in 1986, Conyngham was credited with four drug interdictions and was awarded the Coast Guard Meritorious Unit Commendation Medal.

Conyngham continued superior performance as she escorted U.S.-flagged merchant shipping through the Persian Gulf during the Iran-Iraq War in 1987 in Operation Earnest Will. During that deployment, she sortied from Bahrain on short notice and provided assistance to USS Stark (FFG-31) after she was hit by two antiship missiles launched by an Iraqi F-1 Mirage. Conyngham was awarded the Navy Unit Commendation for her efforts in assisting the crippled ship. In 1988, Conyngham continued the Gus Can Do tradition during her deployments to the fjords of Norway and Northern Europe.

A 16-year-old girl from Cork, Ireland stowed away aboard Conyngham in July 1988 during the 10-day return voyage to Norfolk. Eight sailors were found guilty of assisting her, with the highest sentence being 70 days in the brig for hiding an illegal alien and aiding entry to the United States. She was returned to Ireland when she reported that she was held against her will, drugged, and sexually abused while on board. No charges were filed with regard to claims of drugs and sexual abuse.

Conyngham completed her 15th Mediterranean deployment and received her fourth Battle Efficiency "E" in 1989 while part of the USS Theodore Roosevelt (CVN-71) battlegroup.

=== Mainspace fire ===
Conyngham suffered a severe fire on 8 May 1990, while conducting predeployment operations off the Virginia coast. A major fuel-oil fire erupted from the ship's forward fire room into the ship's superstructure, isolating the crew forward and aft, requiring an all-hands effort to extinguish it. The ship had just completed a maintenance availability, and a fuel-oil strainer had not been assembled properly by a contractor and not inspected to verify assembly by ship's company. The result was that the assembly failed catastrophically and started the fire, caused an officer to die, 18 other sailors to be injured, and the ship to be decommissioned shortly thereafter. USS Normandy (CG-60) and USS Briscoe (DD-977) rendered assistance during the incident.

=== Decommissioning ===
Conyngham was decommissioned on 20 October 1990, stricken from the Naval Vessel Register on 31 May 1991, and sold for scrap on 15 April 1994. Conyngham was "broken up" in the Cape Fear River near Wilmington, North Carolina, in 1995.
