= Palace of the National Military Circle =

- Cercul Militar Național
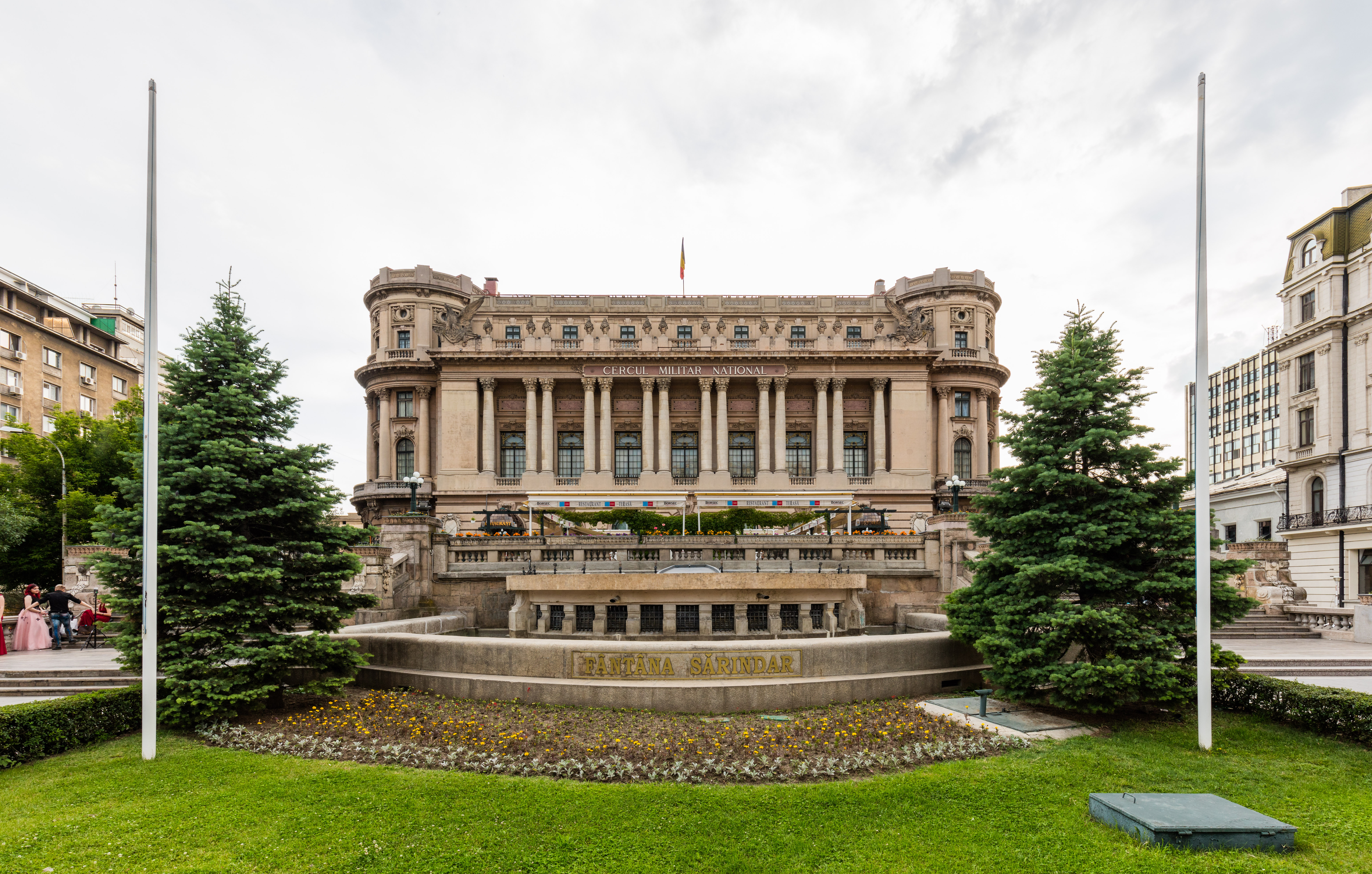
- Interactive map of the Palace of the National Military Circle area

General information
- Architectural style: French neoclassic
- Location: Piața Drapelului, Bucharest, Romania
- Coordinates: 44.4350033°N 26.0979617°E
- Construction started: 1911

Design and construction
- Architects: Dimitrie Maimarolu; Ernest Doneaud
- Engineer: Anghel Saligny; Elie Radu; Paul Saligny; Mircea Radu

Other information
- Public transit access: Universitate metro station

Website
- cmn.ro

The Palace of the National Military Circle, also known as the Officers' Circle Palace (Romanian:Cercul Militar Național) is located on Constantin Mile street in Bucharest, Romania. It was built in 1911, based on plans drawn by chief architect Dimitrie Maimarolu, using French neoclassical style. The beneficiary was the Officers' Circle of the Bucharest military garrison, which was founded in 1876.

== History of the palace ==
The palace was built on the site of the old Sărindar monastery; the fountain in front of the palace bears its name. The construction was done by a team headed by architect Maimarolu, in collaboration with engineers Anghel Saligny and Elie Radu, together with Paul Saligny and Mircea Radu; the interior decoration was supervised by architect Ernest Doneaud.

During the 1916 German occupation of Bucharest in the First World War, the building's interiors were devastated. After the end of the war, the palace was officially inaugurated in 1923. During the communist period, the name was replaced with "Central House of the Army" (Casa Centrală a Armatei). In 1989, it was renamed the "National Military Circle" (Cercul Militar Național).

Today, the National Military Circle palace is considered a historic and architectural monument. It represents the central cultural institution of the Romanian army and it is also used for various cultural events and for representation and protocol purposes. The restaurant and the terrace are open to the public.

== History of the Military Circle ==
The Officers' Circle of the Bucharest military garrison was founded on December 15, 1876; its first director was General Alexandru Zefcari. For a while, the Officers' Circle was housed in rental locations, near Regina Elisabeta Boulevard and Calea Victoriei.

=== Directors ===
- General Alexandru Zefcari, 1876–1877
- General Alexandru Radovici, 1877–1878
- General Alexandru Budișteanu, 1878–1882
- General Alexandru Cernat, 1882–1883
- General Eracle Arion, 1883–1893
- General Alexandru Tell, 1893–1894
- Colonel Gheorghe Mareș, 1897–1902
- Colonel Constantin Z. Boerescu, 1902–1903
- Colonel George Georgescu, 1905–1907
- General Alexandru Anghelescu, 1907–1908
- Colonel Scarlat Panaitescu, 1911–1912
- General Dumitru Iliescu, 1912–1916
- General Constantin Iancovescu, 1916–1919
- General Ioan Istrate, 1919–1921
- General Grigore Constandache, 1928–1929
- General Nicolae Popescu, 1930–1931
- General Ioan Bădescu, 1931–1932
- General Grigore Constandache, 1933–1934
- General Grigore Cornicioiu, 1934
- General Ioan Negoescu, 1934–1937
- General Gheorghe Mihail, 1937–1939
- General David Popescu, 1939
- General Constantin Sănătescu, 1939
- General Alexandru Orășanu, 1939–1940
- General Barbu Alinescu, 1940–1942
- Colonel Ioan Dimulescu, 1942–1943
- Colonel Gheorghe Georgescu, 1943–1947
- Colonel Ion Petreanu, 1947–1949
- Lt. Colonel Ioan Eremia, 1949–1950
- Colonel Corneliu Mănescu, 1950–1952
- Colonel Eugen Bantea, 1952–1953
- Colonel Matei Maci, 1966–1978
- General Ion Aurel, 1978–1980

== Gallery ==
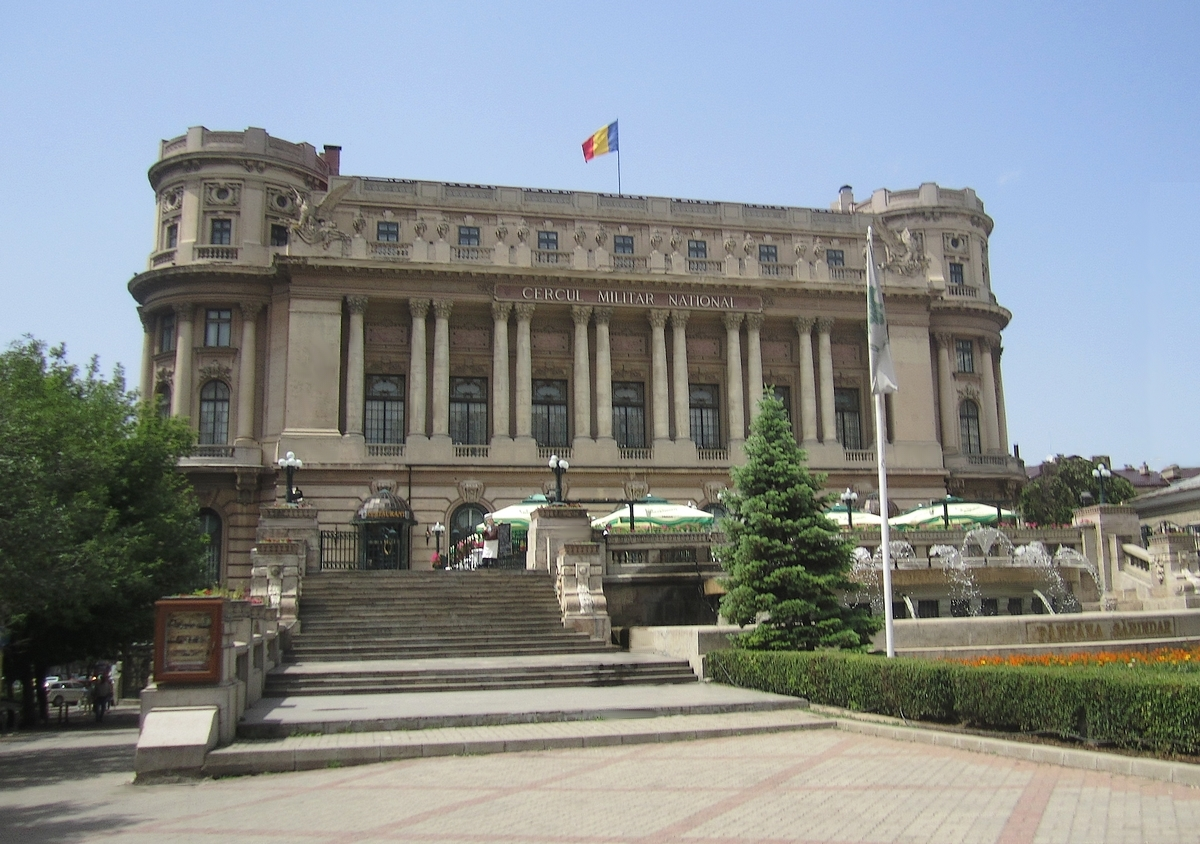

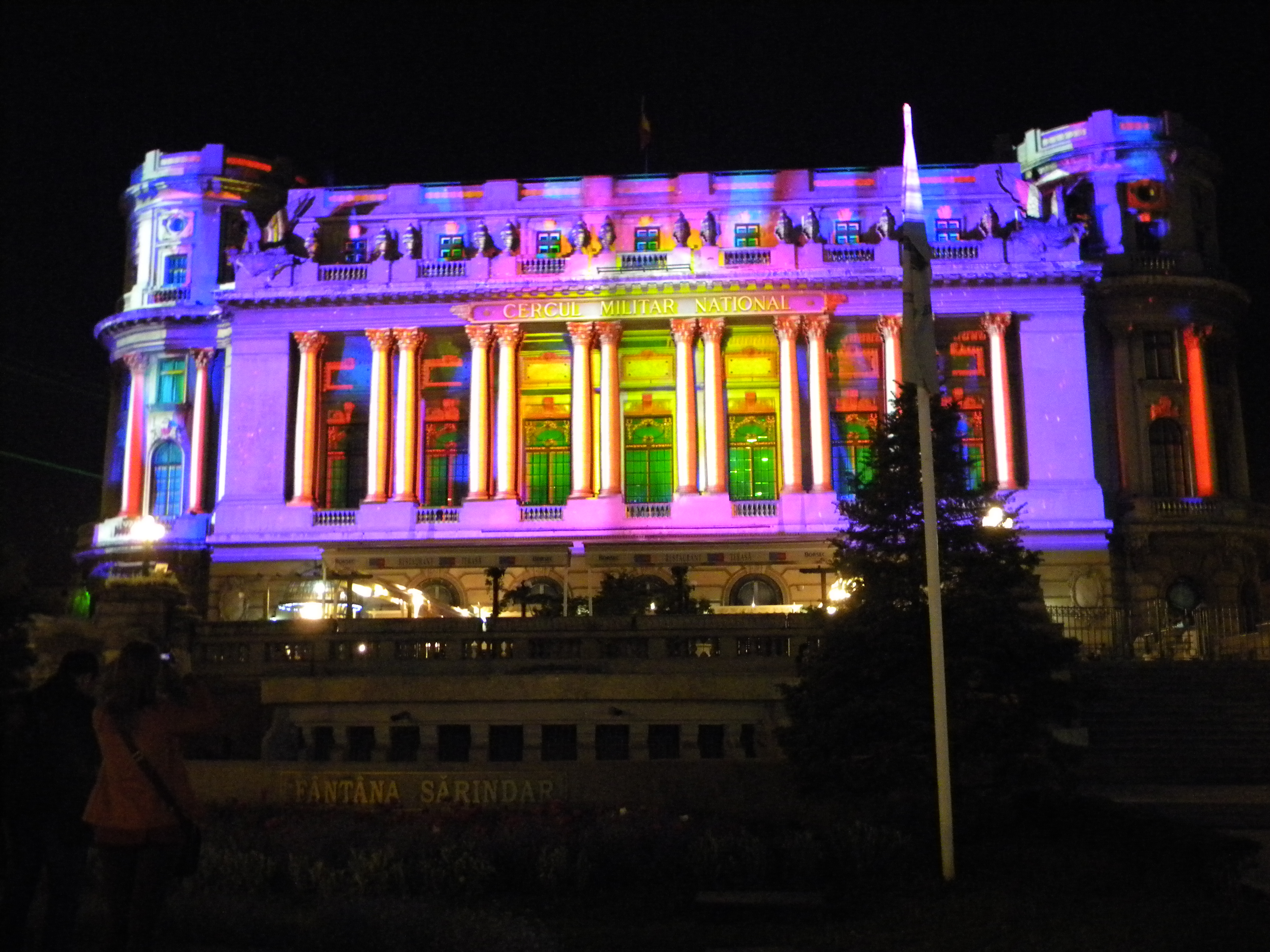

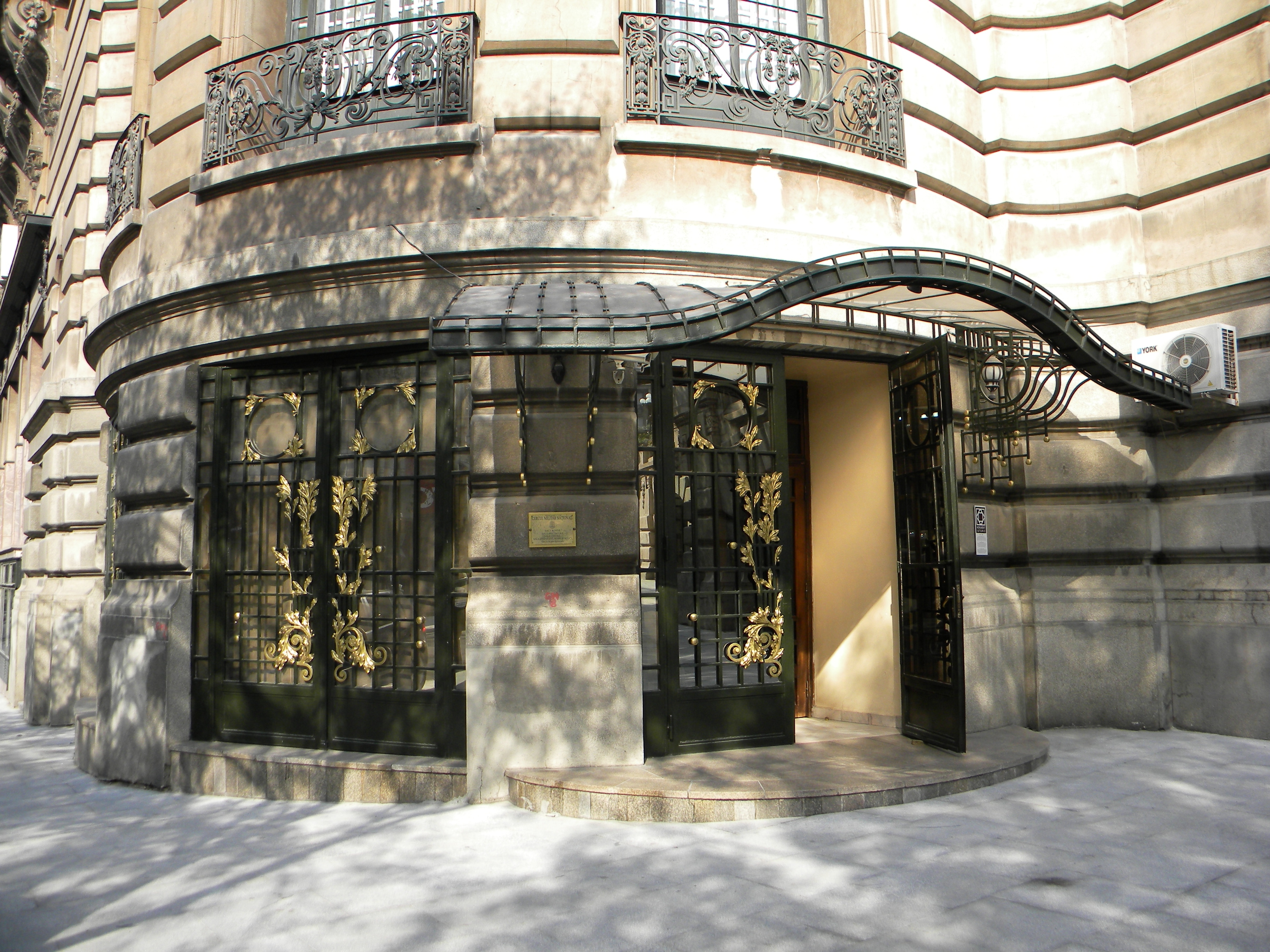

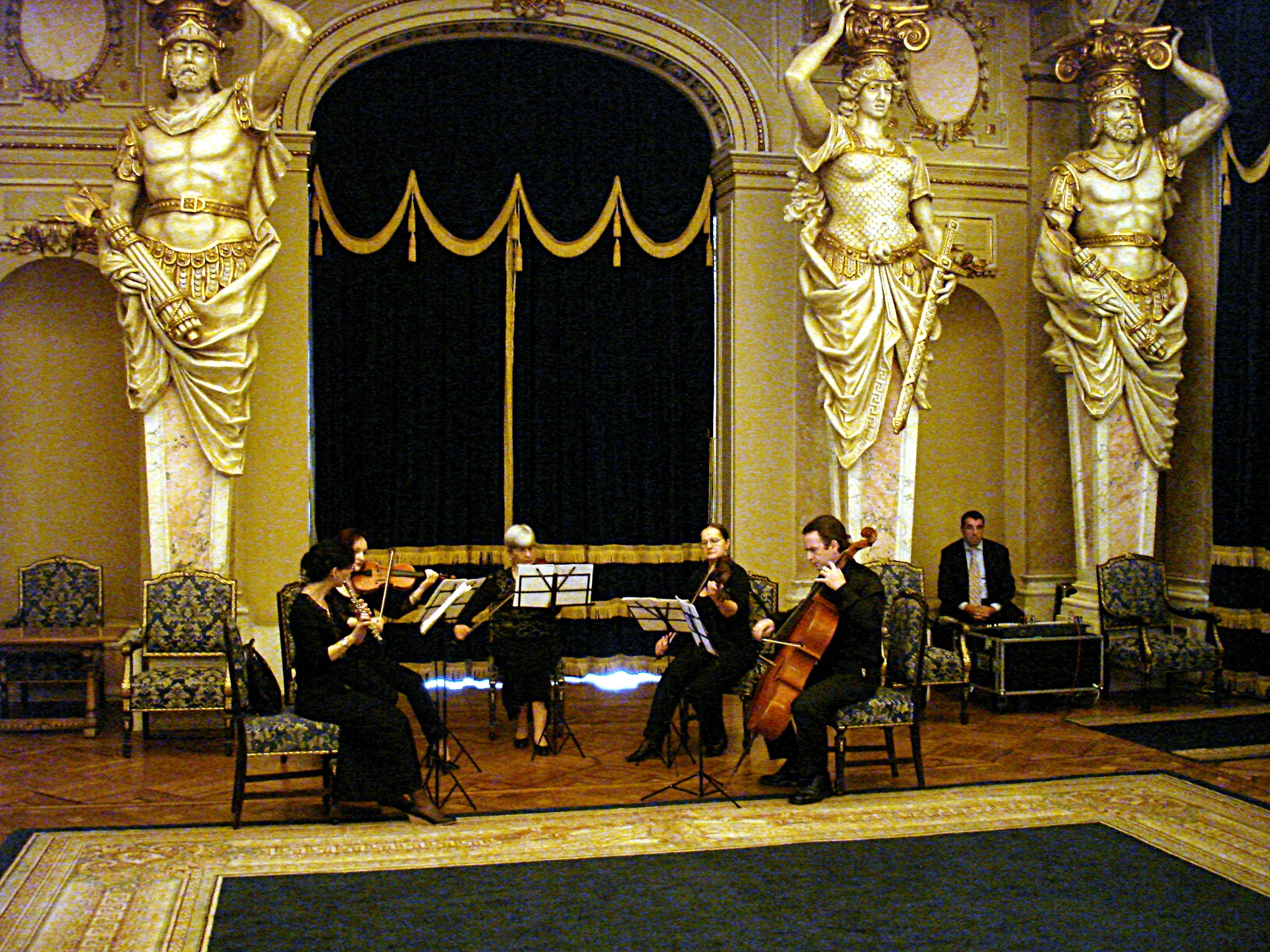

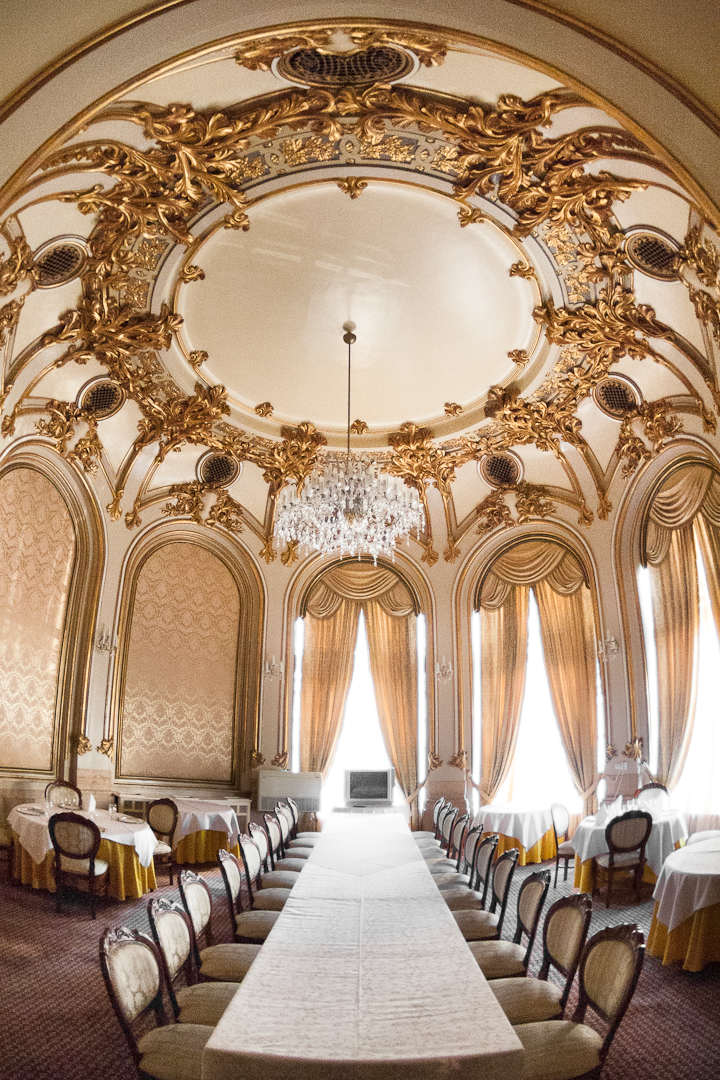

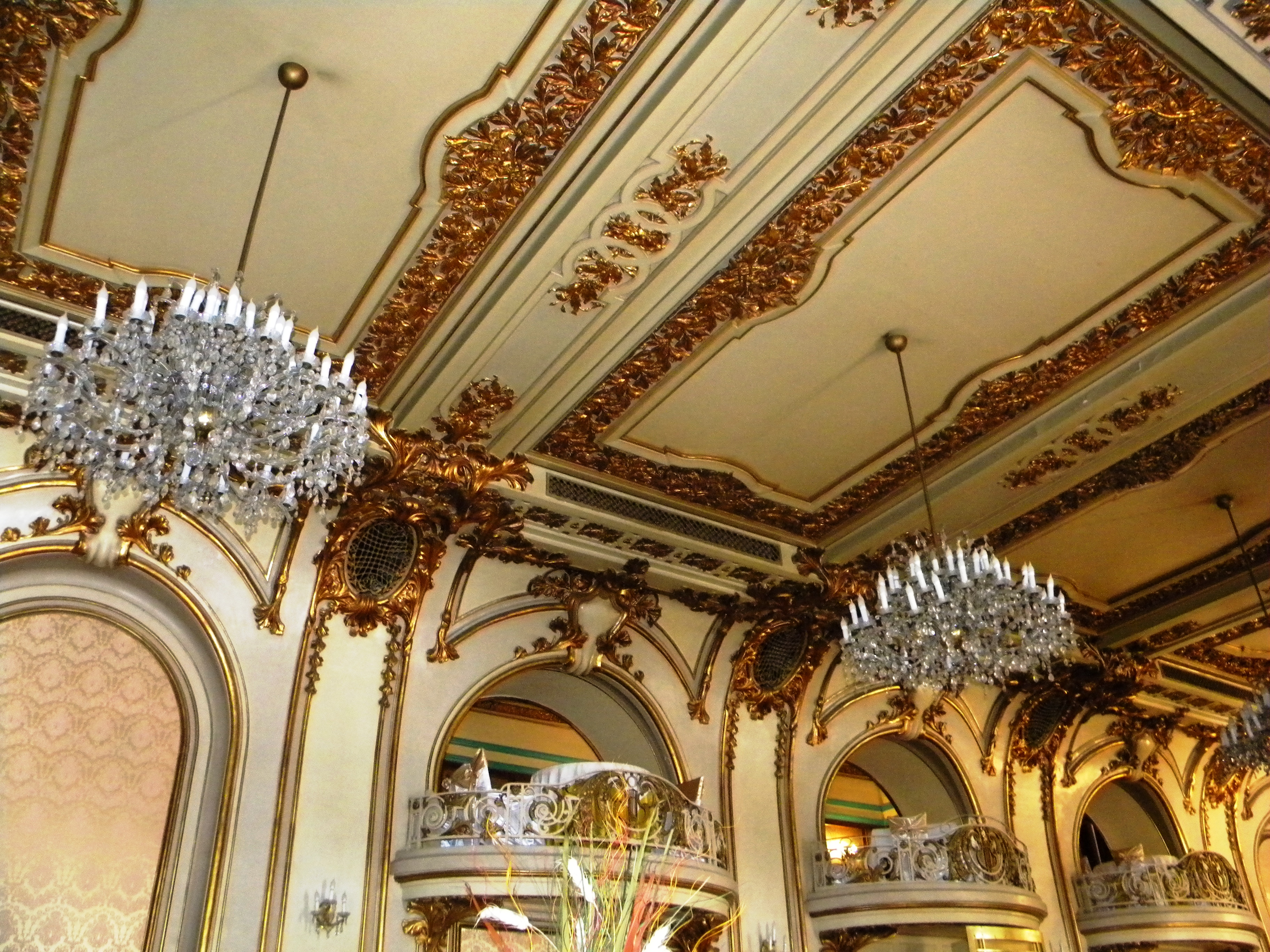

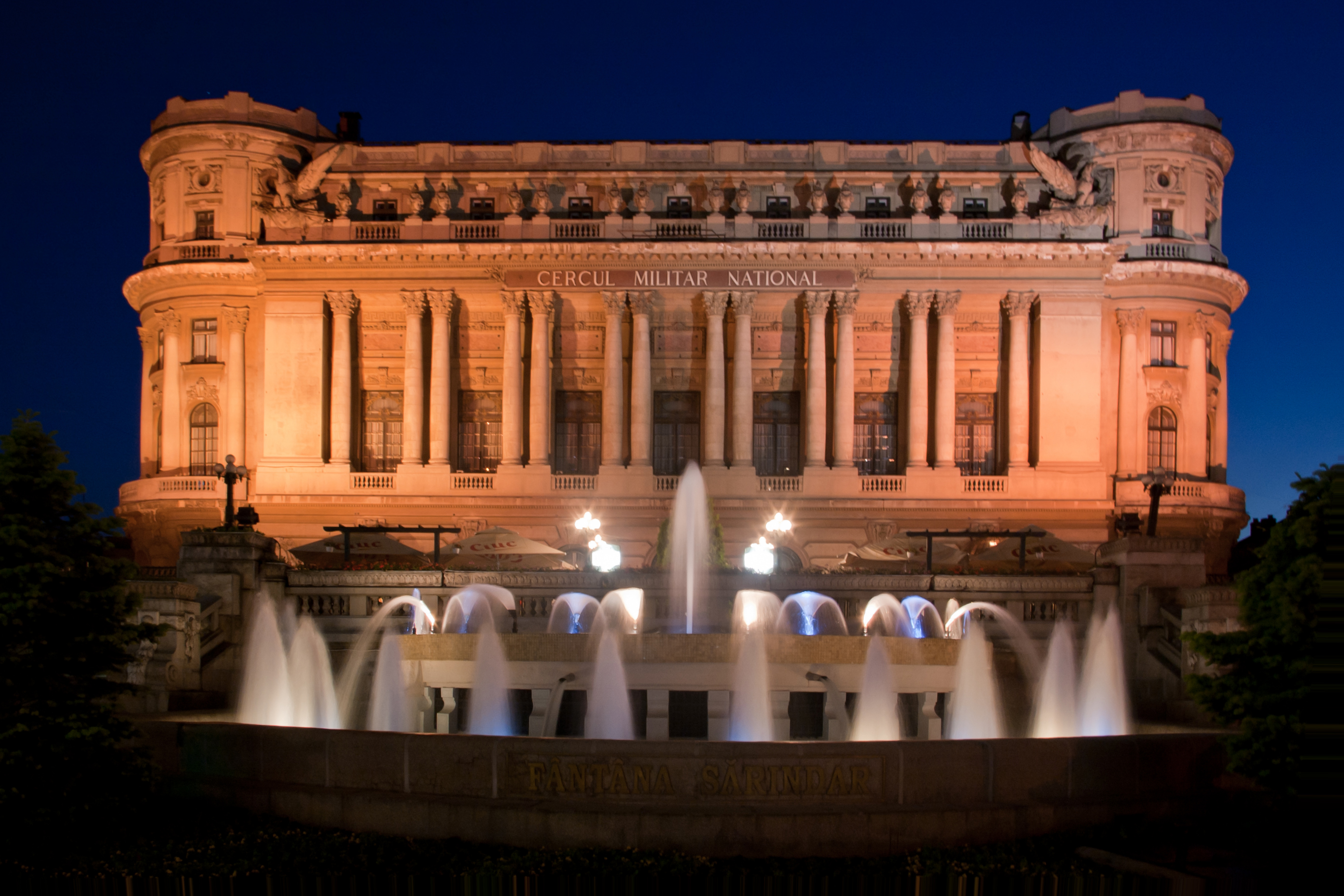

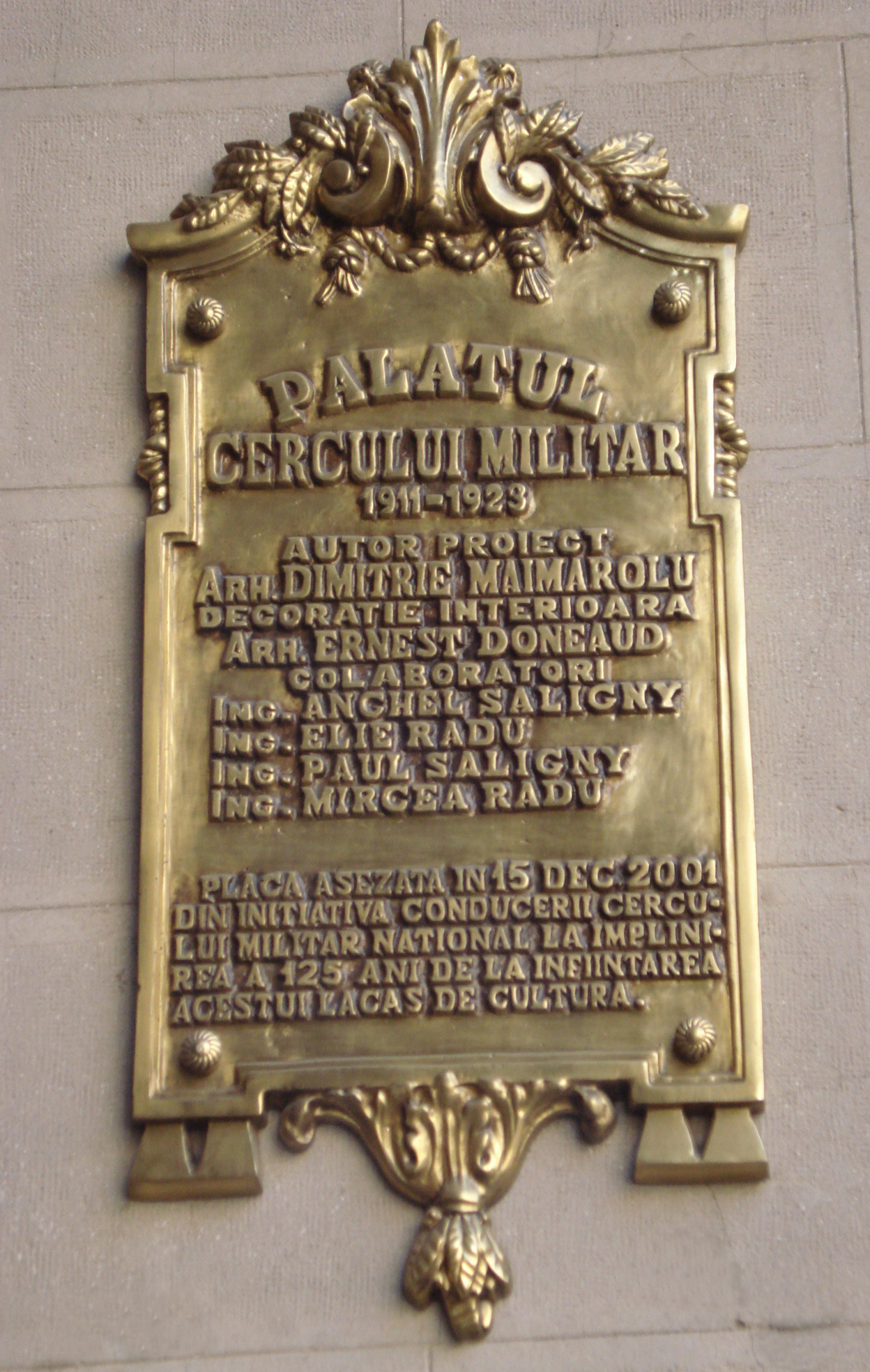
