= USS Conyngham (DD-371) =

Mahan-class destroyer

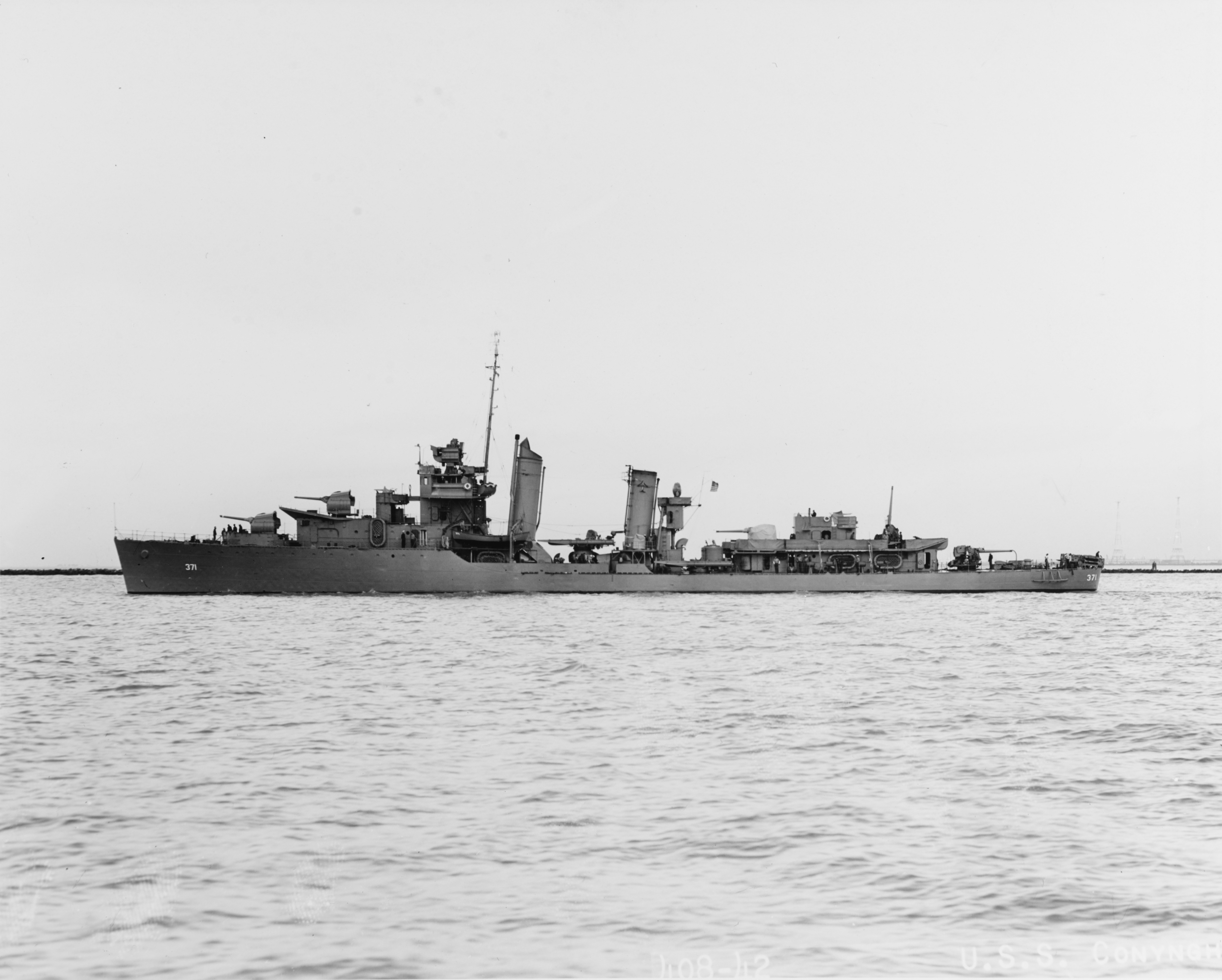

History

United States
- Namesake: Gustavus Conyngham
- Builder: Boston Navy Yard
- Launched: 14 September 1934
- Commissioned: 4 November 1936
- Decommissioned: 20 December 1946
- Honours and awards: 14 × battle stars
- Fate: Sunk in test 2 July 1948

General characteristics
- Class & type: Mahan-class destroyer
- Displacement: 1,500 tons
- Length: 341 ft 4 in (104 m)
- Beam: 35 ft (10,7 m)
- Draft: 9 ft 10 in (2,8 m)
- Speed: 37 knots
- Complement: 158 officers and crew
- Armament: As Built: 1 × Gun Director above bridge; 5 × 5"(127mm)/38cal DP (5x1), 12 × 21 inch (533 mm) T Tubes (3x4), 4 × .50cal (12.7mm) MG AA (4x1), 2 × Depth Charge stern racks, c1943: 1 × Mk33 Gun Fire Control System, 4 × 5" (127mm)/38cal DP (4x1), 12 × 21 inch (533 mm) T Tubes (3x4), 2 × Mk51 Gun Directors, 4 × Bofors 40 mm AA (2x2), 6 × Oerlikon 20 mm AA (6x1), 2 × Depth Charge roll-off stern racks, 4 × K-gun depth charge projectors

The second USS Conyngham (DD-371) was a Mahan-class destroyer used in the United States Navy before and during World War II. She was named after Gustavus Conyngham.

== History ==
Conyngham was launched 14 September 1934 by Boston Navy Yard; sponsored by Mrs. A. C. G. Johnson; and commissioned 4 November 1936.

In the spring of 1937, Conyngham made her maiden cruise to ports of northern Europe, and after overhaul at Boston, Massachusetts, sailed for San Diego, California where from 22 October she conducted training exercises. Operations along the west coast, in the Hawaiian Islands, and in the Caribbean continued until 2 April 1940, when she sailed from San Diego for Pearl Harbor, and duty with the security patrol. In March 1941, she sailed on a cruise to Samoa, Fiji, and Australia, returning to local operations from Pearl Harbor.

On 7 December 1941, when the Japanese attacked Pearl Harbor, Conyngham lay moored at berth X-8, East Loch, Pearl Harbor, on the starboard side of a nest of five destroyers to port of destroyer tender Whitney (AD-4). To port of Conyngham lay USS Reid (DD-369), USS Tucker (DD-374), USS Selfridge (DD-357) and USS Case (DD-370). The nest of destroyers opened fire on the attacking Japanese, and downed several enemy planes.

Conyngham continued to patrol from Pearl Harbor through December, and after a brief overhaul at Mare Island, had escort duty between the west coast and the New Hebrides. In June 1942, Conyngham's escort duties were interrupted to screen carriers in the Battle of Midway, and fought on 4, 5, and 6 June.

Conyngham returned to escort duties until 16 October 1942, when she put out from Pearl Harbor to screen Enterprise for action in the Southwest Pacific. She defended the carriers in the Battle of the Santa Cruz Islands on 26 October. On 2 November, Conyngham bombarded Kokumbona, a village on the island of Guadalcanal, and while maneuvering in close quarters, collided with another destroyer. The resulting damage was temporarily repaired at Nouméa and completed at Pearl Harbor. Conyngham returned to Espiritu Santo 4 February 1943 to resume her support of the Guadalcanal operation. On 7 February she bombarded Doma Cove, and for the next 5 months, continued patrol and escort duties between bases in the South Pacific and Australia.

Conyngham brought gunfire support to Operation Chronicle, landings on Woodlark and Kiriwina Islands, off New Guinea from 1 to 3 July 1943, and on 23 August bombarded Finschhafen, New Guinea. On 4 September she screened landings at Lae, New Guinea, and was attacked by three bombers, which damaged her with near misses. Quickly repaired, she returned to Finschhafen 22 September to cover landings, and then sailed to Brisbane, Australia. She was back in action for the landings on Arawe, New Britain, on 15 December, on Cape Gloucester 26 December, and on Saidor, New Guinea, 2 January 1944. She continued duties in the New Guinea area, aside from a repair period in Australia in January 1944, until she sailed in March for an overhaul at San Francisco, California.

Returning to Majuro late in May 1944, Conyngham sailed with TF 58, screening battleships during the Marianas operation. On 13 June she fired in the bombardment of Saipan, and remained in the Marianas offering fire support, escort, and patrol services until August. After escorting ships in preparation for the return to the Philippines, Conyngham arrived in Leyte Gulf 4 November screening reinforcements. She was strafed by a float plane on 16 November, which wounded 17 of her men and caused slight damage to the ship. On 7 December she covered the landings in Ormoc Bay under heavy air attack, and on 11 December, entered Ormoc Bay again with reinforcements.

== Fate ==
Putting into Manus for replenishment 23 December 1944, Conyngham sailed on to Hollandia to join the screen of a convoy bound for Leyte and on the landings in Lingayen Gulf. Here she joined in pre-assault bombardment, and remained on patrol after the landings of 9 January 1945 until 18 January. On 1 February, along with USS Lough she sank in error motor torpedo boats PT-77 and PT-79 near Talin Point. At Subic Bay from 22 July for overhaul, she remained there at the close of the war, and was decommissioned 20 December 1946. Used as a target in the 1946 atomic weapons tests at Bikini, she was destroyed by sinking 2 July 1948 off the California coast.

Conyngham received 14 battle stars in World War II.
