= Magyar Agár =

Magyar agár
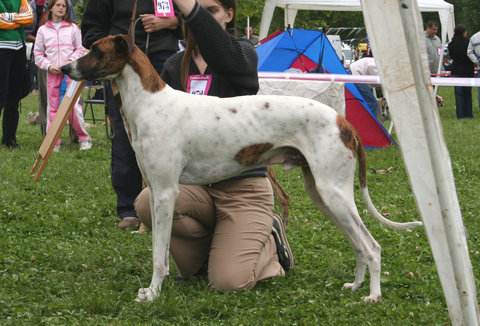
- Other names: Hungarian greyhound, Hungarian agar
- Origin: Hungary; Transylvania
Traits
| Height | Males | 65–70 cm (26–28 in) |
| | Females | 62–67 cm (24–26 in) |
- Coat: smooth, dense
- Color: Any, except for black and tan, blue and tricolor
- Litter size: 6–10 pups
Kennel club standards
- Fédération Cynologique Internationale: standard

The Magyar agár (MA) is a dog breed. It is a type of sighthound originating in Hungary and lands that previously belonged to the Austro-Hungarian Empire (such as Transylvania). It is used for hunting and coursing, and is also kept as a companion.

== Naming ==
Although the Magyar agár is also called the 'Hungarian greyhound', this is a misnomer. The Magyar Agár is a distinct breed with its own breed designation and unique characteristics. A more proper alternative name would be Hungarian gazehound or Hungarian sighthound.

== Description ==
The Magyar agár is a sighthound of elegant yet rugged stature. While they bear some resemblance to Greyhounds, there are a number of significant differences in conformation between the two breeds. Magyar agárs are longer in body than they are tall, and have a heavier bone structure than Greyhounds. Their heads are more wedge-shaped, with substantial jaw muscles and shorter snouts, giving them a less refined appearance than most Greyhounds. They also have much thicker skin with a short, dense and smooth coat that is slightly longer during winter months. As such, they are very hardy dogs and can tolerate lower temperatures better than some of the other short-coated sighthounds. They have rose-shaped ears that are raised about halfway and oval-shaped eyes with a bright and gentle looking expression. They weigh between 49 pounds (22 kg) and 68 pounds (31 kg) with a height between 25 inches (64 cm) and 27 inches (69 cm) at the shoulders. They come in a variety of colors. The amount of "greyhoundness" in the MA is the point of controversy among European breeders and enthusiasts. This issue revolves around the fact that greyhounds were bred with MAs in the 19th century and early 20th century. Some prefer an "old fashioned" variation of the MA with its robust frame and musculature, while some prefer a more "greyhound-like" dog with a lighter frame and more speed.

The sturdy frame of the Magyar agár makes it ideal for coursing game over a rugged terrain. Given their conformation, Magyar agár are not as fast as Greyhounds on short sprints, but possess greater endurance and stamina, making them much more suited to running longer distances for longer periods of time. In the old days, these dogs would have been expected to trail alongside their masters on horseback.

The Magyar agár has an average life span of 12–14 years.

=== Temperament ===
This breed is affectionate and docile. They are unlikely to bite or be snippy with people, although they have a much stronger guarding instinct than some other sighthound breeds. They are usually well behaved around children and also with other dogs. They are somewhat reserved but should not be overly shy. They are intelligent, easy to train and faithful. As with all dogs, early socialization is a must.

Magyar agárs are very adaptable and can live comfortably in apartments as well as outdoor kennels as long as they are provided with adequate exercise and human interaction. If kept inside, they are very easy to housebreak and make wonderful house pets. During the day they will spend a good portion of their time sleeping, but they are by no means "couch potatoes" and do require daily exercise to stay fit and happy. Long walks, free running and trotting next to a bicycle are the best ways to exercise Magyars since they are not usually too keen on ball-chasing as are other breeds.

Although they can live peacefully with cats and other small animals inside the home, it is important to remember their coursing heritage. They are an excellent coursing dog, and are still employed for such purposes in Hungary. As such, they will tend to want to chase down anything that resembles prey. However, with proper introduction and supervision, they can coexist very well with cats and small dogs.

== History ==
These dogs probably accompanied the Magyars to the Carpathian Basin and Transylvania in the 10th century. Tradition tells us that the Magyar agár first arrived in northeastern Hungary and the Great Alföld (Hungarian Plain) a little over a thousand years ago. The earliest archeological evidence for the Magyar agárs has been found in the Carpathian Mountains along the northern and eastern border of Hungary. Currently it is not known whether the Magyar agárs existed before the Magyars reached the Carpathian basin.

Although they have lived throughout the Great Alföld, they have had a strong hunting history in the three counties of Szabolcs-Szatmár-Bereg, Hajdú-Bihar and Somogy. The conformation of the Magyar agár has remained the same from the Medieval to the Modern Age until the introduction of the greyhound in the 19th century.

The Magyar agár was bred for long distance racing: dispatching hare or deer shot by horseback riders in an open field or open stand of forest. Hungarians claim that the MA was expected to run along the hunters for distances of 30 kilometres (19 mi) to 50 kilometres (31 mi) per day. Through most of Hungarian history the Magyar agár was not restricted to the nobility, although the MA owned by the nobility were much bigger than the others. "Magyar Agárs owned by the peasants were known as Farm Agárs or simply as Hare Catchers. These smaller versions of the MA are now extinct."

== Modern uses ==
In addition to making fine companion animals, the elegant appearance and wash-and-wear coat of the Magyar agár make it very suitable for conformation showing. Although rare outside of Europe, a small number of Magyar agárs do reside in the United States. North American Magyar agár owners do have opportunities to show their dogs in United Kennel Club, North American Kennel Club/Rarities, American Rare Breed Association, and International All Breed Canine Association conformation events. In addition, the Magyar agár is eligible to compete in LGRA and NOTRA amateur racing events and ASFA lure coursing events.

== See also ==
- Hungarian dog breeds
- List of dog breeds
