= Aqel =

Aqel عاقل
- Village
- Location within Iran
- Coordinates: 37°11′57″N 47°24′12″E
- Country: Iran
- Province: East Azerbaijan
- County: Meyaneh
- Bakhsh: Central
- Rural District: Kolah Boz-e Sharqi

Population (2006)
  - Total: 33
- Time zone: UTC+3:30 (IRST)
  - Summer (DST): UTC+4:30 (IRDT)

Aqel (Persian: عاقل, also Romanized as ‘Āqel; also known as Agir and ‘Aqīl) is a village in Kolah Boz-e Sharqi Rural District, in the Central District of Meyaneh County, East Azerbaijan Province, Iran. At the 2006 census, its population was 33, in 5 families.
