= HNoMS Æger =

Several ships of the Royal Norwegian Navy have been named Æger after Ægir, the Jötunn king of the sea in Norse mythology:

- HNoMS Æger (1894), a 2.-class gunboat in service from 1894 to 1932.
- HNoMS Æger (1936), a Sleipner-class destroyer commissioned in 1938.
- HNoMS Æger (1963), a Sleipner-class corvette in service from 1967 to 1992.
