= Andrew Ager =

Canadian composer (born 1962)

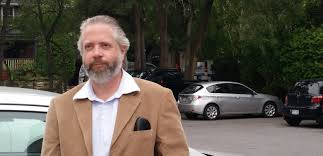
- Born: 12 February 1962 (age 64)
- Occupations: Composer, Arranger, Pianist, Organist
- Years active: 1980–present
- Website: Ager Productions

Andrew Ager (born 12 February 1962) is a Canadian composer of symphonies, operas, chamber, and solo music. He lives in Ottawa, where he composes full-time.

== Early life ==
Andrew Ager was born to a musical family. His maternal grandfather, Charles Aharan, was a professional musician during the early part of his life, and his parents and sisters all played piano. Ager commenced piano studies as a child and began composing seriously around age fourteen. He did not study music at school, but was an avid private piano and theory student in suburban Ottawa, winning several Ottawa Music Festival classes as a teenager. When he was fifteen the family moved to Mahone Bay, Nova Scotia, where Ager dropped out of school a year later and spent much time in a studio on their property studying music and literature on his own.

== 1990-2010 ==
In the 1990s Ager began to write for larger ensembles and received numerous commissions while living in Halifax and Toronto. He felt that he had waited a certain period of time before doing this in order to "get it right" in terms of technique and structure. He was especially busy as a freelance pianist and composer in Toronto from 1993-2010, writing for many of Toronto's best known ensembles, such as the Elmer Iseler Singers, The Hannaford Street Silver Band, Talisker Players, and the Penderecki Quartet.

== 2010-2017 ==
In 2010 Ager moved to a rural address in Quebec near Ottawa where he was able to compose without distraction and attend concerts in the city. During this time he was Composer-in-Residence for various ensembles in Albuquerque, Sulmona (Italy), and Ottawa and had his music performed in Berlin, Venice, Monte Carlo, Paris, and New York City, as well as locally. At present he lives in Rockcliffe, Ottawa, and is writing a full-scale grand opera based on a prominent American crime family.

== Operas ==
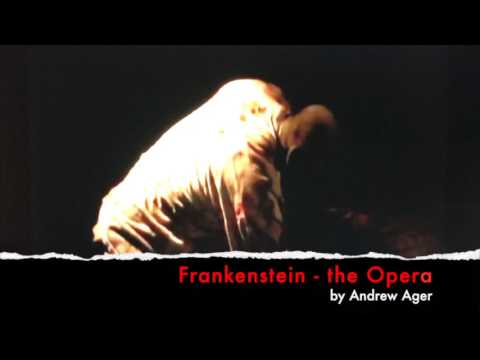
Ager's first opera "Frankenstein"

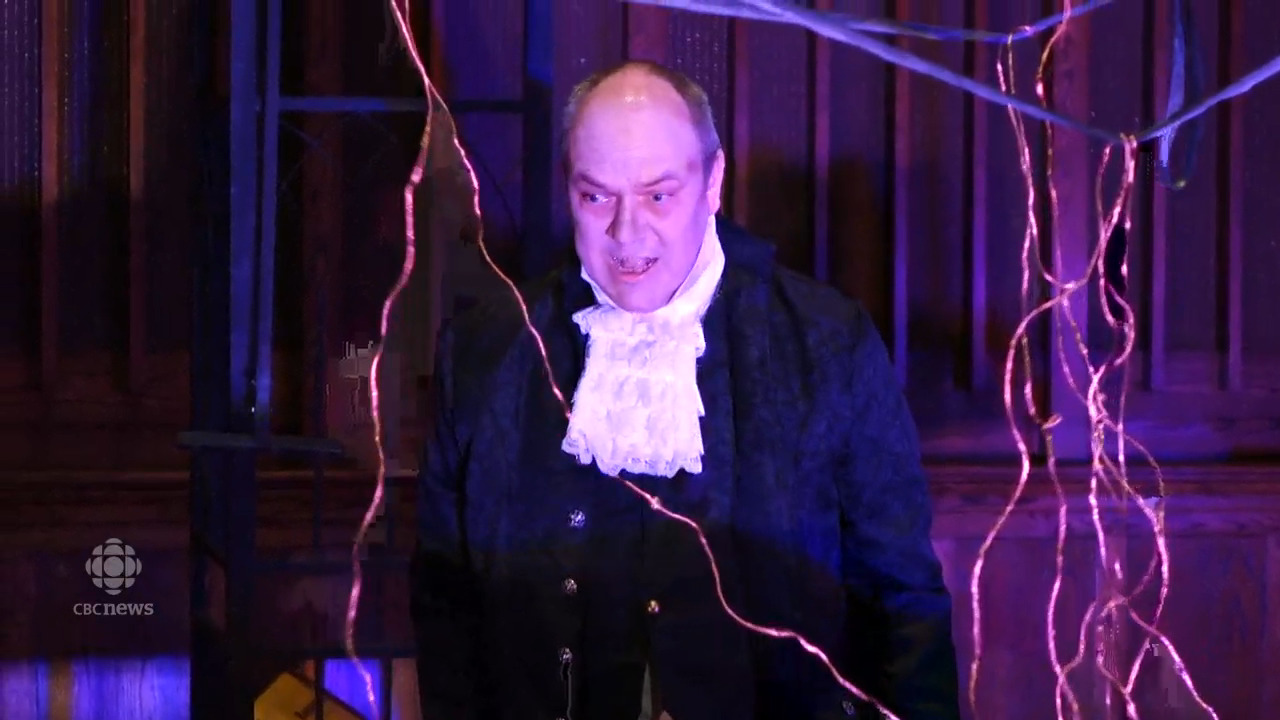
Lenard Whiting as Dr. Frankenstein

=== Frankenstein ===
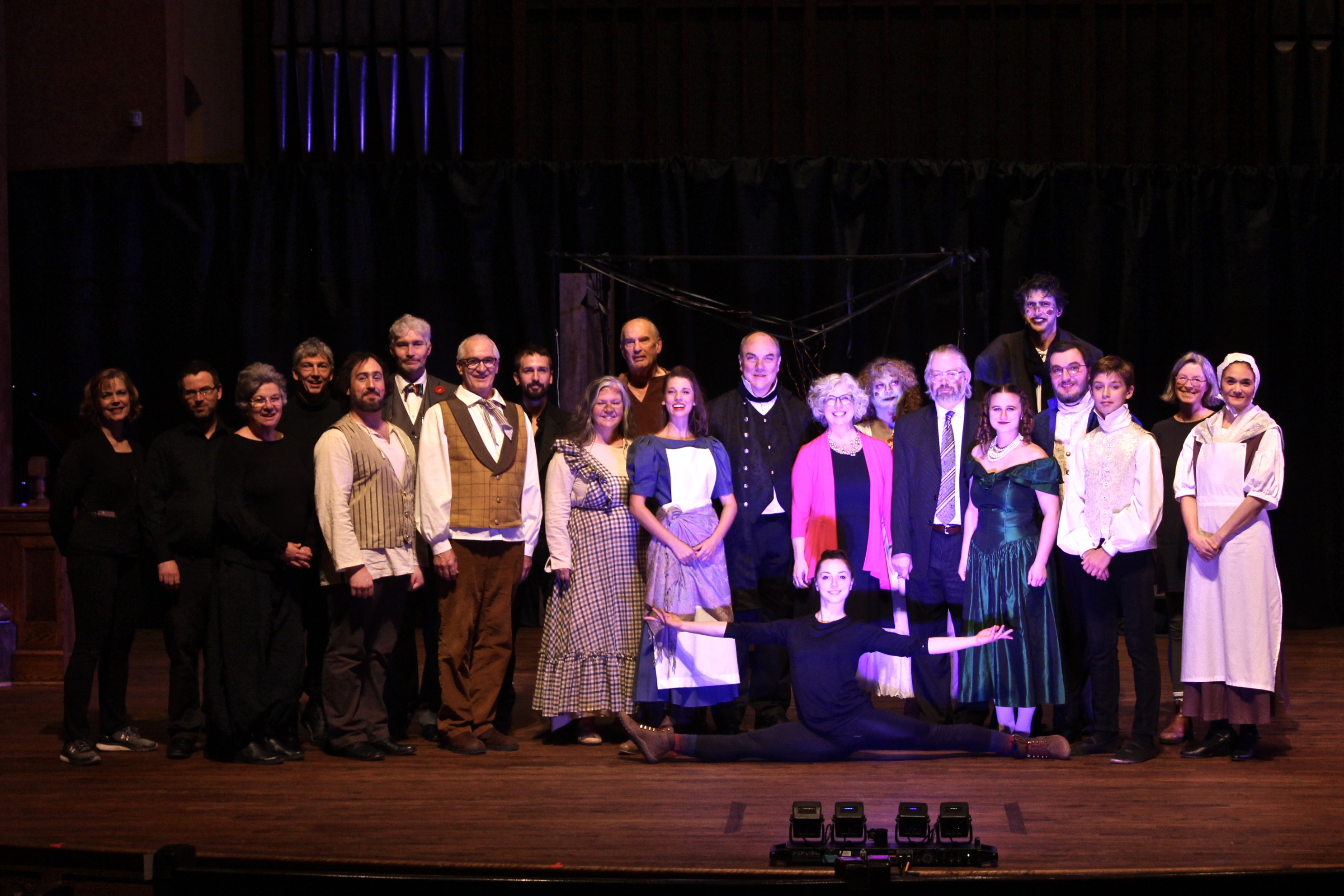
The complete cast and crew assembled on November 1, 2019, following the Ottawa premiere of "Frankenstein".

Ager's first opera "Frankenstein" was produced in Toronto in 2010 by Tryptych, and received excellent reviews such as "Ager's music is so evocative that it should be half again as long, lush yet propulsive". "Frankenstein" received its powerful Ottawa premiere in November 2019 at the Carleton Dominion Chalmers Centre. Fully staged, and with special effects, this production was a highlight of Ottawa's opera season.

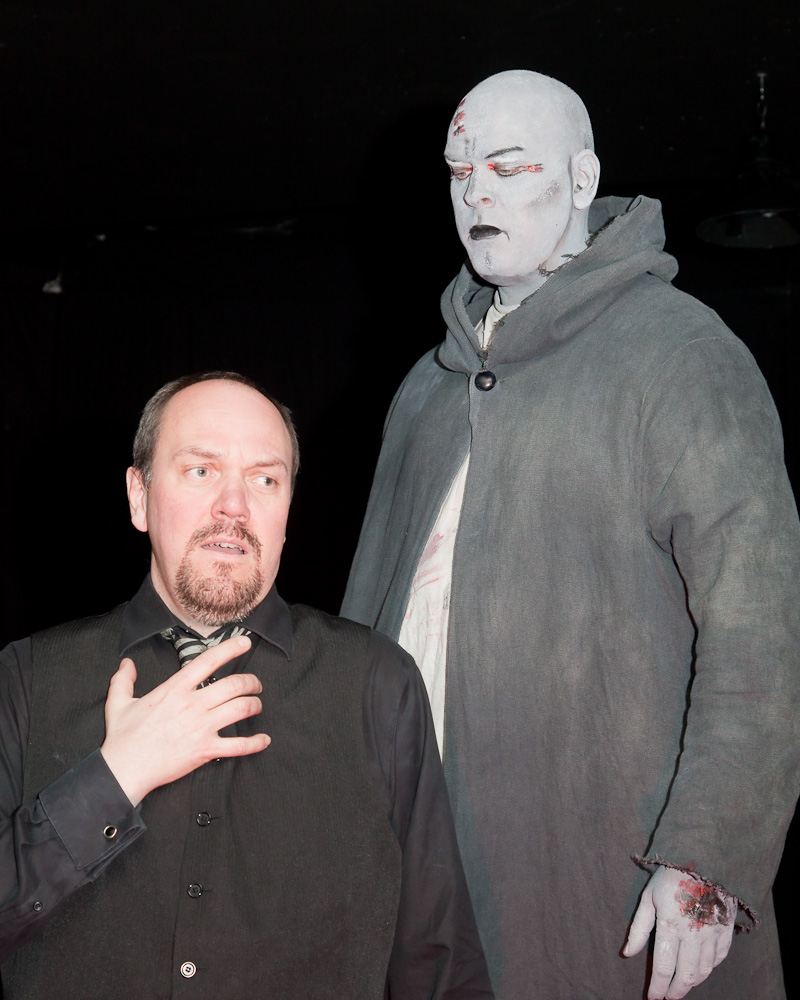
Victor Frankenstein with Creature

=== The Wings of the Dove ===
In 2013 the Centre for Opera Studies in Italy (COSI) mounted Ager's new work "The Wings of the Dove", based on Henry James' novel. This performance took place at Toronto's Heliconian Hall in a production by Michael Albano. "The Wings of the Dove" captures the final climactic episode in the James novel - a compelling tale of love, greed, and betrayal. With a performance time of 1 hour, 15 minutes, this chamber opera is perfect repertoire for any operatic evening.

=== Casanova ===
In 2014, Ager's comic opera "Casanova" was premiered by Ottawa's "Seventeen Voyces", directed by Kevin Reeves, and was produced again in Toronto by COSI the same year.

=== Führerbunker ===
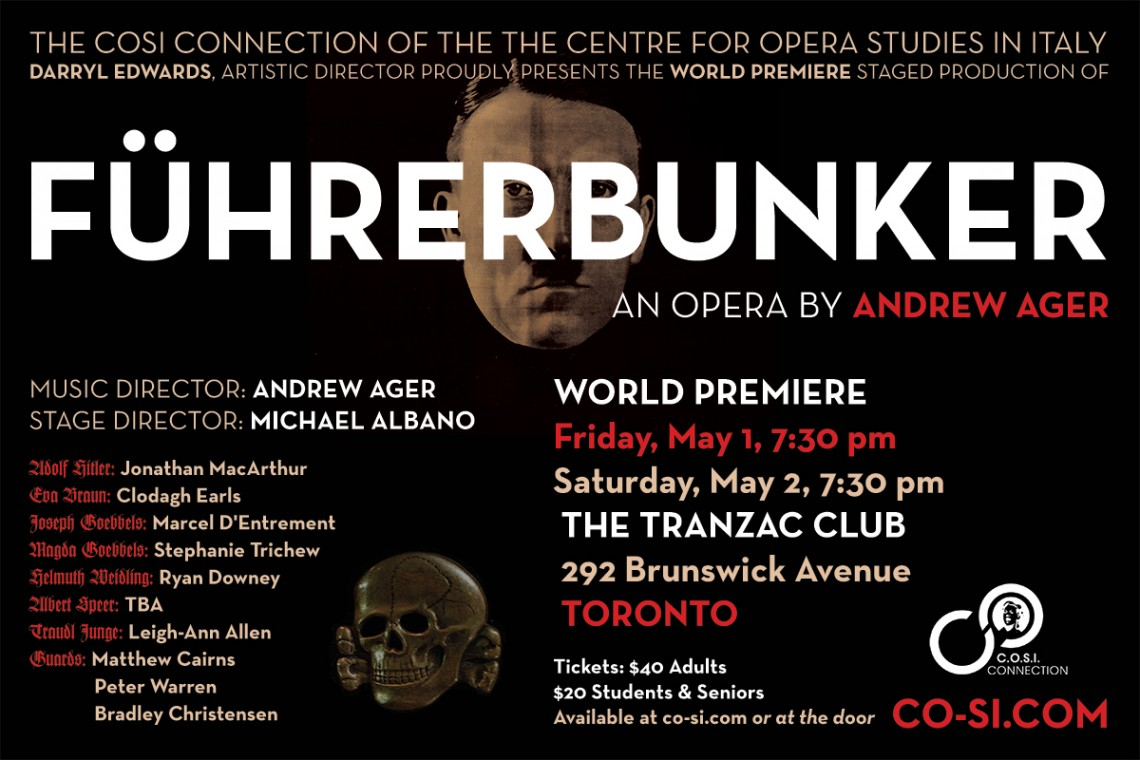
"Führerbunker" promotional poster

Ager's next opera "Führerbunker" had its premier in 2015 in Kitchener, as a co-production with the Waterloo Centre for German Studies. The work then received several productions by COSI in Toronto. This work, regarded as controversial in terms of its subject matter, is a depiction of the fall of Berlin in 1945. Described as a "morbid historical drama", the opera shows the decline and suicide of Adolf Hitler amidst the crumbling surroundings of his underground bunker, in the company of Eva Braun and the remaining staff as Berlin fell to the Soviet armed forces. Ager was advised against writing it - but he has succeeded in creating a stage work that unsympathetically shows the human end of an evil historical figure. "Führerbunker" was produced again in Ottawa in 2016 at the Mayfair Theatre, to much acclaim and discussion.

=== The Unknown Soldier ===
In April 2017, Ager conducted a multi-media performance of his work "The Unknown Soldier" at the Canadian War Museum. The work was adapted and re-orchestrated for the event, which was a commemoration of the 100th Anniversary of the Battle of Vimy Ridge. It includes texts by Canadian, French, British, and German soldiers.

=== The Eleventh Hour ===
In November 2018, Ager conducted the Cantata Signers of Ottawa and Orchestra for the premiere of his work "The Eleventh Hour" at a gala concert commemorating the 100th Anniversary of the end of WWI at the Canadian War Museum.

=== A Christmas Carol ===
Commissioned by Philip and Eleanor Rogers, "A Christmas Carol" (2019) is Ager's take on the well-known Dickens tale. With a performance time of 40 minutes, for chamber ensemble (various versions available or piano only), baritone solo, mixed choir (children's choir optional for trebles) and several easy solos, it was particularly well-received.

== Upcoming Work (2020-22) ==
"Dracula", the second of Ager's "The Gothic Trilogy", is slated for world premiere in November 2021 in Ottawa.

Ager is writing "Angel", a chamber opera set in the Underworld of 1970's New York City. It is a story of deception and survival in a perilous world. "Angel", a young dancer, is in a dangerous situation and finds unknown strengths in herself to survive against all odds. Benjamin Spierman, General Director of the Bronx Opera, will be welcomed as artistic director for the premiere production.

The Centre for Opera Studies and Appreciation, based in Toronto, Darryl Edwards, Artistic Director, is commissioning Ager to write "The Waves", a ghost story using original music and referencing Maritime Folksong.

== Discography ==
Recent premieres (2010-2018) include

- The Talk of the Town, Toronto Symphony Commission, Toronto, Ontario, Canada
- Frankenstein, Op.40 (full opera) Toronto, Ontario, Canada
- Concerto for Organ and Orchestra, Op. 41 Albuquerque, USA
- Symphony no.1, Op.44 Ottawa, Ontario, Canada
- Ovid Songs (tenor and piano), Op. 43 Sulmona, Italy
- Un Amore Doloroso (soprano and piano), Op.42 Venice, Italy
- "Suite from The Wings of the Dove, Op.47 Ottawa, Ontario, Canada
- The Wings of the Dove (chamber opera), Op. 45 Toronto, Ontario, Canada
- Casanova (chamber opera), Op.49 Ottawa, Ontario, Canada
- Divertimento for Horn and Orchestra, Op. 51 (version for horn and organ) Goerlitz, Germany
- Führerbunker (chamber opera), Op. 52 Toronto, Ontario, Canada
- Divertimento for Piano Quartet, Op. 53 Barrie, Canada.
- Concerto for Piano and Orchestra, New York, 2014, composer as soloist, Justin Bischof, conductor.
- The Unknown Soldier, Ottawa, Canadian War Museum, for the 100th anniversary of the Battle of Vimy Ridge, conducted by the composer.
