= General Association of Engineers of Romania =

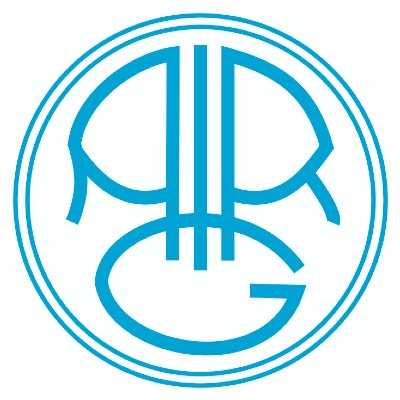
- Abbreviation: AGIR
- Founded: 1918; 108 years ago
- Type: Engineering society
- Location: Bucharest, Romania
- Region served: Romania
- Method: conferences, publications
- Official language: Romanian
- President: Mihai Mihăiță
- Website: www.agir.rom

The General Association of Engineers of Romania (Romanian: Asociația Generală a Inginerilor din România, AGIR) is a non-governmental professional organization of engineers in Romania, with the objectives of promoting industrial culture and supporting the professional activity of engineers by highlighting achievements.

== History ==
Professional associations of engineers were established in Romania as early as the 19th century, when in 1876 the Society of Engineers and Architects was created, but the first viable association was the Polytechnic Society, established in 1881 on the occasion of the inauguration of the Buzău-Mărășești railway, the first railway in Romania designed and executed by Romanian engineers. The first president of the Polytechnic Society was Ștefan Fălcoianu, honorary president being Dimitrie Sturdza. Subsequently, among the presidents of the society were personalities such as Anghel Saligny and Elie Radu.

In 1918, the General Association of Engineers of Romania was established in Iași. The stated aim was to "organizse and increase the knowledge and working power of engineers (...), in order to make the most use in the work of restoring the country (...), solidarity and support for their professional interests". The first president of AGIR was Gheorghe Balș, and one of the next was Nicolae Vasilescu-Karpen.

In 1949 the two associations merged under the name of the Scientific Association of Technicians (AST), president being the academic Nicolae Profiri, who at that time was the president of both the Polytechnic Society and AGIR. The name of the association was changed from 1951 to 1962 to the Scientific Association of Engineers and Technicians (ASIT), and from 1962 to 1989 to the National Council of Engineers and Technicians (CNIT).

In 1990 the association resumed its name as the "General Association of Engineers of Romania".

Over the years, engineering associations have been supported by personalities such as Spiru Haret, Ion I. C. Brătianu, Vintilă I.C. Brătianu, Constantin F. Robescu, Traian Lalescu, Gheorghe Țițeica, Nicolae Zane, and George Nestor.

== Current Activity ==
The General Association of Engineers of Romania is registered in the European Commission's database as a potential partner in projects covering the engineering and educational fields. It has a library with 22,000 titles, including The Encyclopædia Britannica, the Romanian Technical Lexicon. It has the following publications:

- Univers ingineresc newspaper, bimonthly information publication.
- Buletinul A.G.I.R., quarterly edited by the AGIR Publishing House, containing works presented from various scientific events.
- The A.G.I.R. Year, c.R., containing material about aGIR-related events.

== Symposia ==
=== Scientific Symposium of Romanian Engineers Everywhere ===
The Scientific Symposium of Romanian Engineers of Everywhere (SINGRO) is a scientific communication session organized every two years, with the aim of facilitating the exchange of experience between Romanian engineers in the world, without excluding other people with compatible concerns.

The 12th session of SINGRO, having the theme "Solutions for an intelligent city”, was organized in Craiova, on September 8–9, 2016, in cooperation with the University of Craiova. Engineers from Romania, the Republic of Moldova, France, Switzerland and Bulgaria took part.

== AGIR Awards ==
The General Association of Engineers of Romania recognizes meritorious activity in engineering by the following awaerds:

- The AGIR prize, established in 1995, awarded every year on September 14, on the "day of the engineer”, for works of high technical and scientific level.
- The Excellence Prize Medal awarded to persons having substantial contributions to the development of the association.
- The AGIR Medal, awarded to persons with exceptional activity within the association or in the field of engineering.
