= Gustavus Conyngham =

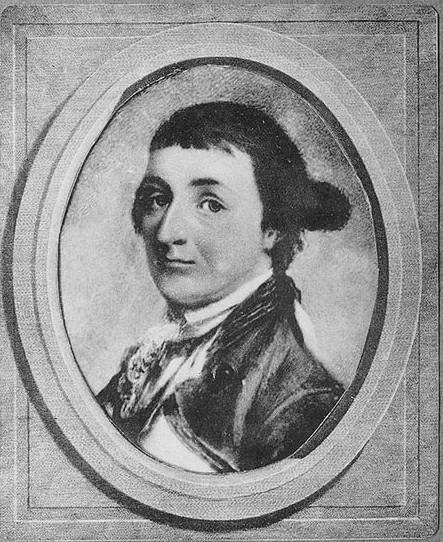
Gustavus Conyngham

Gustavus Conyngham (about 1747 – 27 November 1819) was an Irish-born American merchant sea captain, an officer in the Continental Navy and a privateer. As a commissioned captain fighting the British in the American Revolutionary War, he captured 24 ships in the eastern Atlantic between May 1777 and May 1778, bringing the expenses associated with British shipping to what was then an all-time high. He has been called "the most successful of all Continental Navy captains".

== Early life ==
Born in County Donegal, Ireland, in 1747, Conyngham left school at a young age. He emigrated to Philadelphia in 1763 to work for his cousin Redmond Conyngham in the shipping industry. After being mentored by a Captain Henderson, Conyngham became captain of a merchant sloop, the Charming Peggy. With the outbreak of the Revolutionary War in 1775, he sought to smuggle arms from European ports to the Thirteen Colonies.

== Escape from the British ==
Because Great Britain was patrolling for any arms deals, he had arranged a transaction with Dutch traders in order to safely transfer the goods. However, he was caught in becalmed winds for too long – the British were able to find him based on a tip from a mutinous sailor. Andrew Frazer, the British official in charge of Conyngham's arrest, placed a guard on board the Charming Peggy and ordered her to set sail for England as soon as the winds prevailed. However, once the weather turned, Conyngham and his crew overpowered the guard and escaped. Despite their best efforts though, the wind died shortly after, leaving them stranded once again. This time, instead of waiting to be captured, Conyngham sold the Charming Peggy to the Dutch government in order to be able to purchase a new ship when under less suspicion. However, due to corruption and embezzlement within the government itself, he was never given any profits from the sale of his ship, and was forced to find another way to accomplish his mission.

== Obtaining the Surprise ==
After the loss of his ship, Conyngham headed to France, hoping to connect with an ally to the United States. It was there he met Benjamin Franklin, a man who would help him in his adventures many times in the future. They formed a lasting relationship, and Conyngham eventually awarded Franklin the nickname "the Philosopher" for his intellectual fortitude and resourcefulness. Franklin had been entrusted with several commissions of the Continental Navy, and on March 1, 1777, Conyngham was appointed as captain of the lugger Surprise. He quickly went to work, heading towards the narrow English Channel and capturing the Prince of Orange and the Joseph within a week. The Prince of Orange was holding mostly mail, so he sent it to Dunkirk to be unloaded, but the Joseph was holding more valuable cargo such as wine and oranges, and was sent to France as a prize. Unfortunately for Conyngham, France had a treaty with Britain that forbade the selling of commandeered good in French ports, and when Lord Stormont, Britain's Secretary of State for the Northern Department, heard of Conyngham's actions he demanded that France return the Joseph and arrest him. Not ready to commit to a war with Britain, French officials bowed to Lord Stormont's demands, turning over the Joseph and calling for Conyngham's arrest. He was sent to a French prison under charges of piracy.

== Success aboard the Revenge ==
Again, it was Conyngham's friend, "The Philosopher", who came to his rescue. Recognizing that Conyngham was a talented sailor from his avoidance of the British within their own channel, Franklin set about obtaining a new ship for him. However, this was no easy task in Europe at the time – Britain was watching the construction of new ships and was prepared to move against any vessel they thought was being built to aid the American cause. Therefore, the ship was built as the Greyhound, and Franklin had installed false buyers in order to further confound the British. One of the buyers, Richard Hodge, then sailed the ship into the ocean, where Conyngham boarded it and took command, renaming the vessel Revenge.

Having more tonnage, manoeuvrability and firepower than the Surprise, Conyngham immediately set to work attacking British shipping. It was here that he earned his nickname "the Dunkirk Pirate", ignoring his written orders to proceed directly to the American coastline for logistical support and resupply and instead heading directly to Dunkirk to begin his cruise against the British. In his first cruise, he averaged one ship every three days, sinking or capturing over twenty ships during his two-month stay in the Baltic and North Sea. He then sailed to Cap Ferrol in order to resupply and replace his crew. He then headed to the West Indies, continuing to use Spain as his primary base of operations. Over the next eighteen months he captured or sunk sixty ships, causing a 10% rise in British shipping insurance rates between Dover and Calais. This brought the expenses associated with shipping to their all-time highest level, outpacing their rates even during Britain's previous wars with France and Spain. Dozens of merchants resorted to paying French and Dutch ships to carry their goods to avoid Conyngham's attacks.

Conyngham's cruise off the English coastline only ended when he captured a ship carrying valuable wartime supplies, which he deemed worthy of an escort to American shores. He arrived in Philadelphia on 21 February 1779 with his goods in tow. It was then that his luck began to turn sour.

== First return to America and imprisonment ==
It is ironic that the first friendly port Conyngham had seen in years would treat him so poorly. Though the local newspapers hailed him as a returning war hero, the Continental Congress was less than pleased with his disobedience to orders and his loss of his original commission, which had been confiscated by the French during his brief stay in their prison. Adding to this, as Conyngham was not the owner of the Revenge, it was sold at a private auction.

Nevertheless, because Conyngham had been so successful as her captain, he was again given command with orders to raid British shipping for a private profit. However, during one of his first cruises he was unable to outrun the British warship HMS Galatea, and was taken aboard as a prisoner. As his notoriety had grown since his last capture, he was given shabby treatment by his guards. By his own report he was kept in irons until he reached prison, and was given no more than a "cold plank as my bed, a stone for a pillow". Additionally, he was fed meager rations, causing him to lose fifty pounds while imprisoned on the ship en route to a prison.

Since he did not have a commission at the time, and he was arrested on charges of piracy and sent to the prison at Pendennis Castle from which he escaped, only to be caught again and transferred to Mill Prison, Plymouth. He was kept in irons continuously at both Pendennis Castle and Mill Prison. In fact, it was only by the watchful hand of Benjamin Franklin that Conyngham was kept from the gallows. Franklin wrote to General George Washington about Conyngham's missing commission, and Washington wrote to the British saying that if Conyngham met with the noose, he would hang six captive British officers in response.

However, despite these conditions, he refused to accept an invitation to leave prison by joining the Royal Navy. In fact, while in prison he aided in the creation of a document stating that each member who signed would not leave the American cause regardless of what the conditions could become. Conyngham was placed on trial for high treason, but before his sentence was determined and carried out he escaped. Conyngham and eleven other prisoners had broken into the prison vault allowing them to use tools to dig a tunnel extending "a considerable distance" underneath the outer wall of the prison. Had a boy's arm not been broken during the scramble for the exit, alerting the sentries, hundreds more prisoners may have escaped with him.

== Escape and return to America ==
After his escape, Conyngham fled to Texel Island in the Netherlands to try to find a way back to America where he could potentially receive a new ship. His spirits were high – he reported later that he was amused by the portrayals of himself as a monster that he saw displayed all over London while in disguise. He planned on making his way back to France where he could again enlist the help of his friend Benjamin Franklin, but instead met with a stroke of luck. While he was resting in Texel, John Paul Jones arrived in port after his battle with the Serapis. Jones took him aboard, and they cruised together for several months until Conyngham left the Alliance at a Spanish port in order to board a ship headed for American shores. However, it was here that Conyngham's luck ran out once again. While aboard the Experiment en route to America, he was recaptured by the British on 17 March 1780, and sent back to Mill Prison in Plymouth. He remained there until his release due to a political prisoner exchange. This time, he headed for Ostend, where he obtained the armed vessel Layona, which he prepared to go cruising in once again. However, he received news of a treaty, and instead boarded the Hannibal, which was on its way back to his hometown of Philadelphia.

== Later service and death ==
In many ways, his second return to the United States earned him a colder welcome than the last. The Continental Congress refused to pay him properly for his work because of his inability to produce his commission, which had been confiscated from him by the French almost three years ago. Because Benjamin Franklin had given him an official commission, he was not merely a privateer, but an actual Captain in the United States Navy. As such, he was entitled to two-twentieths of the value of the ships he took as prizes. As he could not produce his commission, and Benjamin Franklin died before he could give proper testimony of Conyngham's commissioning, the Continental Congress refused to pay him what he was due, and instead treated him as a common privateer during his earliest and most successful raids. However, despite his quarrels with the government, he still continued to serve his country. During the Quasi-War with the French, he captained the Maria, an armed merchant vessel, bringing much needed supplies to the front lines. Towards the end of his life, he was elected to the Common Council of Philadelphia, and managed to raise thirty thousand dollars in loans from the population in order to defend the city during the War of 1812. He never allowed his quarrels with politicians to come between his commitment to his country. He died quietly in his home on 27 November 1819. He is buried with his wife, Ann Conyngham, in the churchyard of St. Peter's Episcopal Church in Philadelphia.

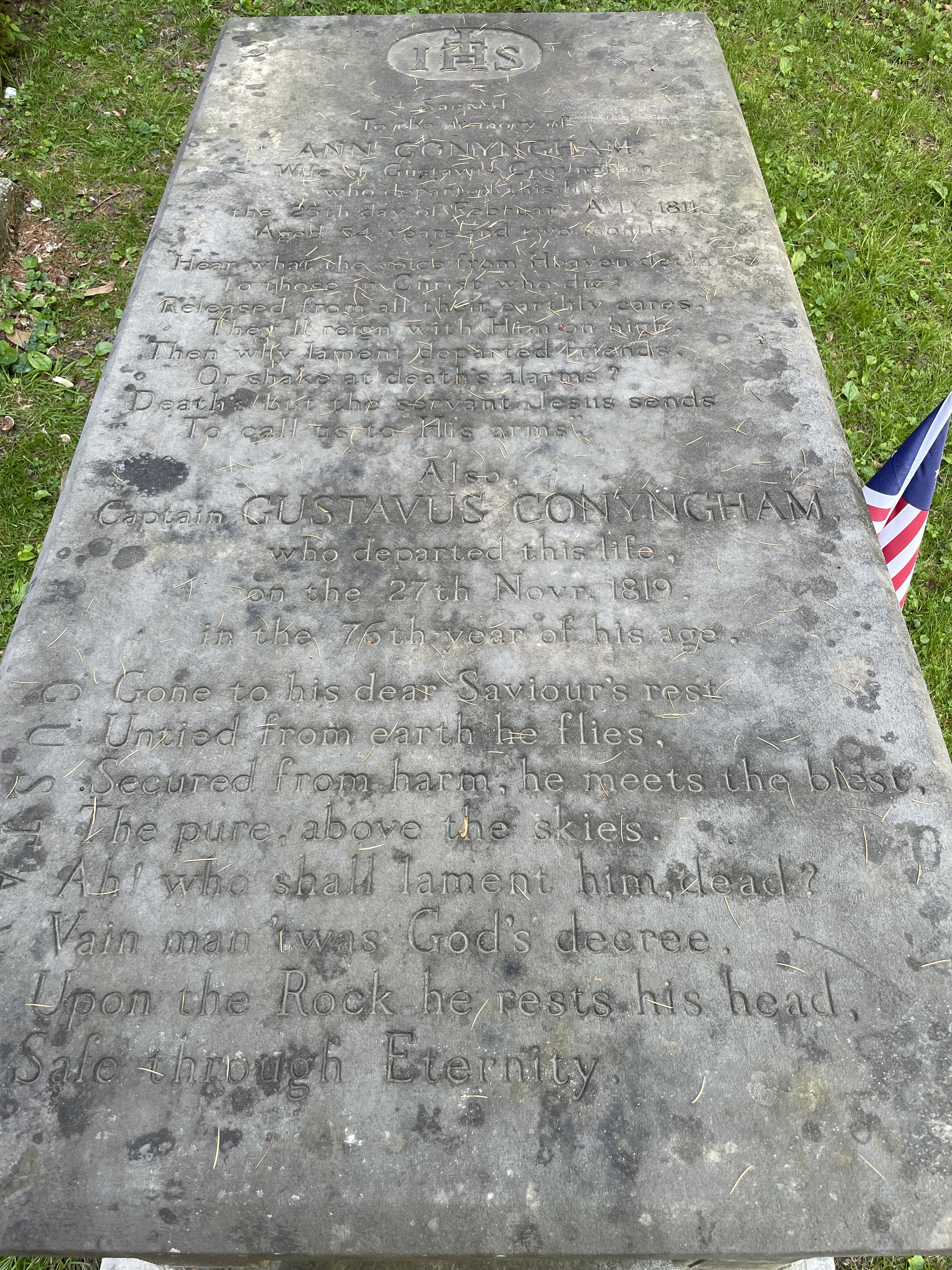
Gustavus Conyngham Grave

Nearly a century later, John Barnes, a retired navy captain and naval historian, acquired a cache of autographs and documents from a sale by Charavay of Paris. In the collection was Conyngham's commission from Benjamin Franklin. Barnes published his discovery in September 1902.

== Legacy ==
Three ships in the United States Navy have been named USS Conyngham for him and Conyngham Borough, Luzerne County, Pennsylvania, was named in his honor.

== Sources ==
- Augur, Helen. The Secret War of Independence. First ed. Chicago: Duell, Sloan & Pearce, 1955.
- Boatner, Mark Mayo. Cassell's Biographical Dictionary of the American War of Independence. St. John's Hill, London: Littlehampton Book Services Ltd, 1973.
- Bowen-Hassell, E. Gordon, Dennis Michael Conrad, and Mark L. Hayes. "Gustavus Conyngham." In: Sea Raiders of the American Revolution: The Continental Navy in European Waters. Washington: Naval Historical Center, 2003. 16 – 41.
- Cooper, J. Fenimore. History of the Navy of the United States of America. First ed. Mead & Company: G. P. Putnam & Co, 1853.
- (Ed.), Robert Wilden Nesser. Letters and Papers Relating to the Cruises of Gustavus Conyngham, a Captain of the Continental Navy, 1777–1779. First ed. New York City: Naval History Society, 1915.
- Franklin, Benjamin. The Works of Benjamin Franklin: Containing Several Political and Historical Tracts Not Included in Any Former Edition, and Many Letters, Official and Private, Not Hitherto Published [v. 9] [1882]. New York City: Cornell University Library, 1882.
- Hazard, Samuel. Hazard's Register of Pennsylvania. v. 15, 1835 Jan-July, Ann Arbor, Michigan: University of Michigan Library, 2009.
- Historical Society of Pennsylvania. The Pennsylvania Magazine of History and Biography (Volume XXII, 1898). Philadelphia: Historical Society Of Pennsylvania, 1898.
- Jones, Charles Henry. Captain Gustavus Conyngham: a sketch of the services he rendered to the cause of American independence. New York City: The Pennsylvania society of Sons of the revolution, 1903.
- Wyoming Historical and Geological Society. Proceedings and Collections of the Wyoming Historical and Geological Society, For the Years 1923–1924(Volume VIII). Harvard University: The Society, 1904.
