= Klaus Ager =

Austrian composer and conductor

Klaus Ager (born 10 May 1946) is an Austrian composer and conductor.

Born in Salzburg, Ager studied piano, composition, and conducting at the Mozarteum in Salzburg, and musicology at Salzburg University. He continued his studies in composition with Pierre Schaeffer and Olivier Messiaen at the Paris Conservatoire. From 1975 to 1986 he directed the Österreichische Ensemble für Neue Musik (Austrian Ensemble for New Music). From 1995 to 2000 he was rector of the Mozarteum Hochschule in Salzburg. Beginning in 2000, Ager dedicated himself primarily to working as a guest composer and lecturer in South and North America, and to campaigning throughout Europe for an improved standing for composers. In 2003 he was able to achieve through his mustering of relevant subsidies and innovative articles, that the Arovell-Musikzeitschrift was expanded to a color edition with a circulation of 700 copies per quarter. Since April 2004 he has been president of the Austrian Composers Association. In this office he initiated, amongst other things, the congress "Komponieren im Europa des 21. Jahrhunderts", which took place from 2 to 5 February 2006 in the Gläsernen Saal of the Wiener Musikverein.

From 2006 to 2014, he was chairman of the European Composers' Forum (ECF) in Brussels.
