= Ager, California =

Unincorporated community in California, United States

- Unincorporated community
- Location within California Location within the United States
- Coordinates: 41°51′59″N 122°27′38″W
- Country: United States
- State: California
- County: Siskiyou
- Time zone: UTC-8 (Pacific (PST))
  - Summer (DST): UTC-7 (PDT)
- Area code: 530
- GNIS feature ID: 1657893

Ager is an unincorporated community in Siskiyou County, California, United States.
