= Helen Augur =

American journalist and historical writer (1904 – 1969)

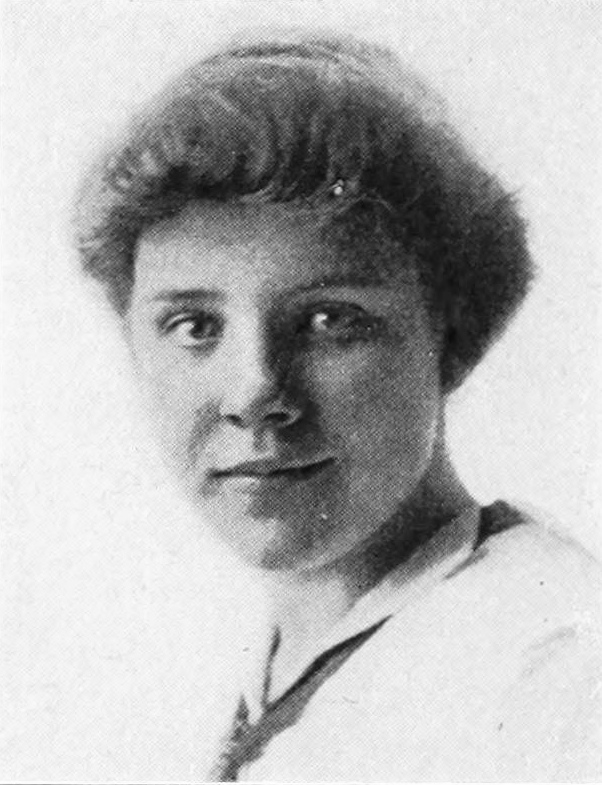
- Helen Augur at Barnard College, c. 1915
- Born: December 25, 1894; Albert Lea, Minnesota, U.S.
- Died: September 15, 1969 (aged 64); Santa Monica, California, U.S.
- Education: Barnard College
- Occupations: Journalist, editor, radio writer
- Years active: 1920s–1970s
- Employer(s): The New York Times; U.S. Office of War Information
- Known for: Journalism and radio work; U.S. Office of War Information activities

Helen E. Augur (died 1969) was an American journalist and historical writer.

== Biography ==
Augur was born in Albert Lea, Minnesota, and graduated from Barnard College in 1916.

Augur became a journalist in Chicago, leaving for a while after the war to become a correspondent for the Chicago Tribune in Russia. She began writing for McCall's in 1932.

In 1937 Augur, had a "torrid, though short-lived love affair" with her second cousin, Edmund Wilson.

Augur wrote several books, including Zapotec and Tall Ships to Cathay. Her book The Secret War of Independence has been called a "memorable account" of "the secret machinations surrounding the American Revolution."

She died from lung cancer in Santa Monica, California, on September 15, 1969, and was buried in Lowville, New York.

== Works ==
- (tr.) Religious Conversion: A Bio-Psychological Study by Sante De Sanctis. London & New York, 1927. The International Library of Psychology, Philosophy and Scientific Method.
- An American Jezebel: The Life of Anne Hutchinson, 1930
- The Book of Fairs, 1939
- Passage to Glory: John Ledyard's America, 1946
- Tall Ships to Cathay, 1951
- Zapotec, 1954
- The Secret War of Independence, 1955
