= Agar (disambiguation) =

Agar is a gelatinous substance with culinary and microbiological uses.

Agar may also refer to :

== Places ==
=== Asia ===
- Agar, Madhya Pradesh, a city and municipality in the state of Madhya Pradesh, India, former capital of the Parmar Rajput kingdom
  - Agar (Vidhan Sabha constituency) the Madhya Pradesh constituency centered around the town
- Agar Malwa district, Madhya Pradesh, India
- Agar, Gujarat, a village and former princely state in Rewa Kantha, India
- Agar, Turkmenistan, a town

=== Elsewhere ===
- Agar, South Dakota, a US town
- Agar Town, a short-lived area in central London
- Agar's Island, Bermuda

== People ==
- Agar (name), a given name and a family name, including a list of persons with the name
- Hagar, a Biblical character, sometimes spelled as Agar
- Virginia Tango Piatti, pen name Agar

== Plants and animals ==
- Agar (dog) or Magyar agár, a dog breed
- Agar tree, common name of Aquilaria malaccensis
  - Agarwood, a fragrant wood used in perfumery

== Other uses ==
- Agar gun, an early type of machine gun
- Agar.io, a massively multiplayer online game featuring cellular blobs
- Agar, a dialect of the Dinka language of South Sudan
- Ulawa Airport, Solomon Islands (ICAO code is AGAR)
- libAgar, is a cross-platform GUI toolkit

== See also ==
- Aggar (disambiguation)
- Auger (disambiguation)
- Augur (disambiguation)
- Agar... If, a 1977 Indian film
