= Monitor (warship) =

Small ironclad warship with large guns

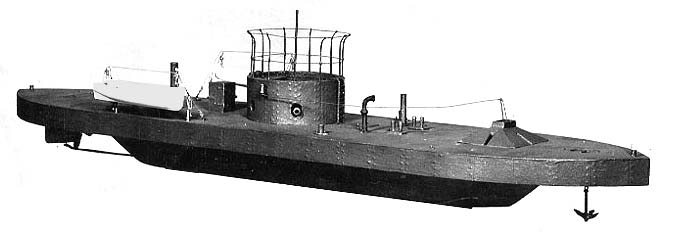
USS Monitor, the first monitor (1861)

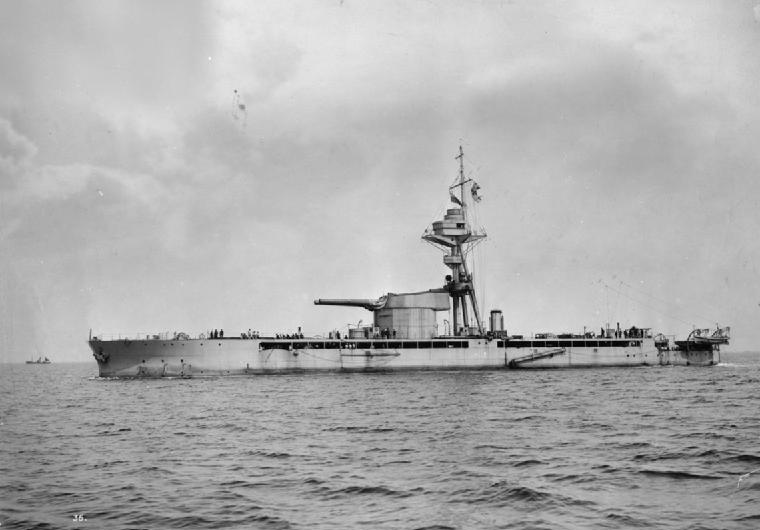
HMS Marshal Ney used a surplus 15-inch gun battleship turret.

A monitor is a type of small warship that is neither fast nor strongly armored but carries disproportionately large guns. Monitors were used by some navies from the 1860s, during the First World War and with limited use in the Second World War.

The original monitor was designed in 1861 by John Ericsson for the Union navy. He named it USS Monitor. Subsequent vessels of this type were accordingly classed as "monitors". They were designed for shallow waters and served as coastal ships. The term also encompassed more flexible breastwork monitors, and was sometimes used as a generic term for any turreted ship. In the early 20th century, the term was revived for shallow-draught armoured shore bombardment vessels, particularly those of the Royal Navy: the Lord Clive-class monitors carried guns firing heavier shells than any other warship ever has, seeing action (albeit briefly) against German targets during World War I. The Lord Clive vessels were scrapped in the 1920s.

The term "monitor" also encompasses the strongest of riverine warcraft, known as river monitors. During the Vietnam War these much smaller craft were used by the United States Navy. The Brazilian Navy's Parnaíba and the Romanian Navy's three Mihail Kogălniceanu-class river monitors are among the last monitors in service.

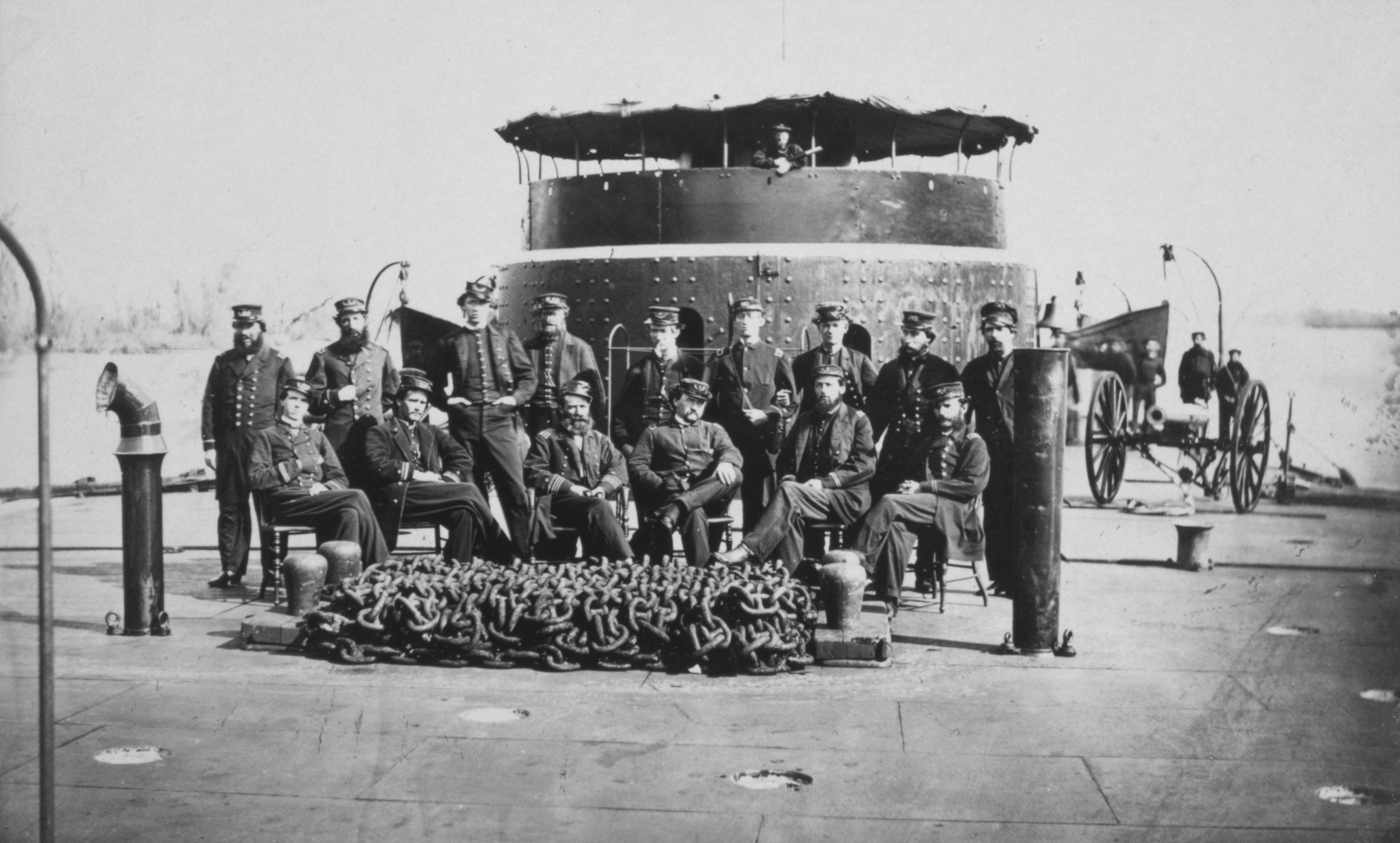
Officers of a Union monitor, probably USS Sangamon, photographed during the American Civil War

== Nineteenth century ==
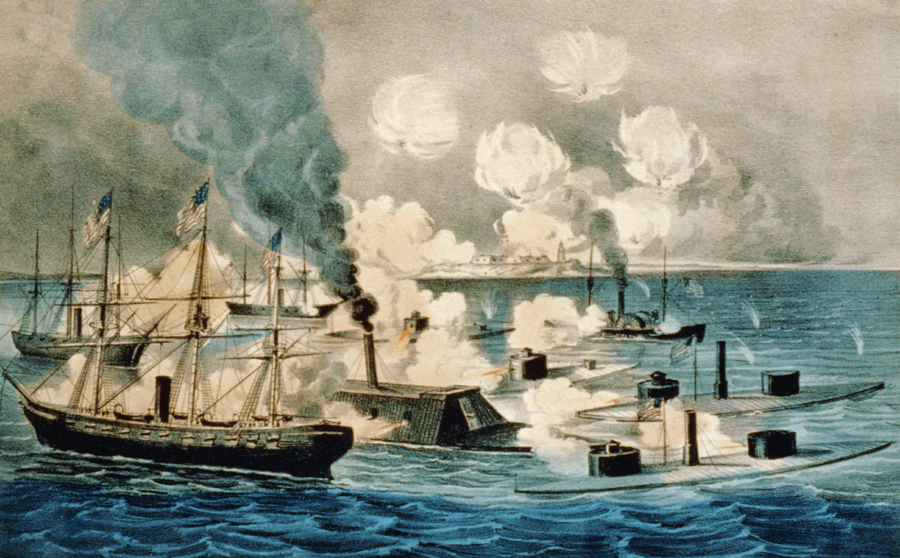
U.S. Navy monitors forcing the surrender of the casemate ironclad CSS Tennessee during the Battle of Mobile Bay

=== American Civil War ===
In Latin, a monitor is someone who admonishes: that is, reminds others of their duties—which is how USS Monitor was given its name. It was designed by John Ericsson for emergency service in the Federal navy during the American Civil War (1861–65) to blockade the Confederate States from supply at sea. Ericsson designed her to operate in shallow water and to present as small a target as possible, the water around her acting as protection.

Nathaniel Hawthorne described Monitor thus:

It was a platform of iron, so nearly on a level with the water that the swash of the waves broke over it, under the impulse of a very moderate breeze; and on this platform was raised a circular structure, likewise of iron, and rather broad and capacious, but of no great height. It could not be called a vessel at all; it was a machine ... it looked like a gigantic rat-trap. It was ugly, questionable, suspicious ... devilish; for this was the new war-fiend, destined ... to annihilate whole navies and batter down old supremacies. The wooden walls of Old England cease to exist ... now that the Monitor comes smoking into view; while the billows dash over what seems her deck, and storms bury even her turret in green water, as she burrows and snorts along, oftener under the surface than above ...

Going on board, we were surprised at the extent and convenience of her interior accommodations. There is a spacious ward-room, nine or ten feet in height, besides a private cabin for the commander, and sleeping accommodations on an ample scale; the whole well lighted and ventilated, though beneath the surface of the water ... It was like finding a palace, with all its conveniences, under the sea. The inaccessibility, the apparent impregnability, of this submerged iron fortress are most satisfactory; the officers and crew get down through a little hole in the deck, hermetically seal themselves, and go below ... A storm of cannon-shot damages them no more than a handful of dried peas. We saw the shot-marks made by the great artillery of the Merrimack on the outer casing of the iron tower ... with no corresponding bulge on the interior surface. In fact, the thing looked altogether too safe ... the circumvolutory movement of the tower, the quick thrusting forth of the immense guns to deliver their ponderous missiles, and then the immediate recoil, and the security behind the closed port-holes.

The Battle of Hampton Roads (March 1862), between Monitor and CSS Virginia, was the first engagement between ironclad vessels. Several such battles took place during the course of the American Civil War, and the dozens of monitors built for the United States Navy reflected a ship-to-ship combat role in their designs. However, fortification bombardment was another critical role that the early monitors played, though one that these early designs were much less capable in performing.

Three months after the Battle of Hampton Roads, John Ericsson took his design to his native Sweden, and in 1865 the first Swedish monitor was built at Motala Warf in Norrköping, taking the engineer's name. She was followed by 14 more monitors. One of them, Kanonbåten Sölve, served until 1922 and is today preserved at the Maritiman marine museum in Gothenburg.

Ericsson and others experimented greatly during the years of the American Civil War. Vessels constructed included a triple-turreted monitor, a class of paddlewheel-propelled ironclads, a class of semi-submersible monitors, and a class of monitors armed with spar torpedoes.

=== 1866 to 1878 ===
In the 1860s and 1870s several nations built monitors that were used for coastal defense and took the name monitor as a type of ship. Those that were directly modelled on Monitor were low-freeboard, mastless, steam-powered vessels with one or two rotating, armoured turrets. The low freeboard meant that these ships were unsuitable for ocean-going duties and were always at risk of swamping, flooding and possible loss. However, it greatly reduced the cost and weight of the armour required for protection, and in heavy weather the sea could wash over the deck rather than heeling the ship over.

Attempts were made to fit monitors with sails, but the provision of masts interfered with the turrets' ability to operate in a 360-degree arc of fire and the weight of masts and sails aloft made the ships less stable. One ship, HMS Captain, which combined turret and sails with a low freeboard, was lost in heavy weather.

==== War of the Pacific ====
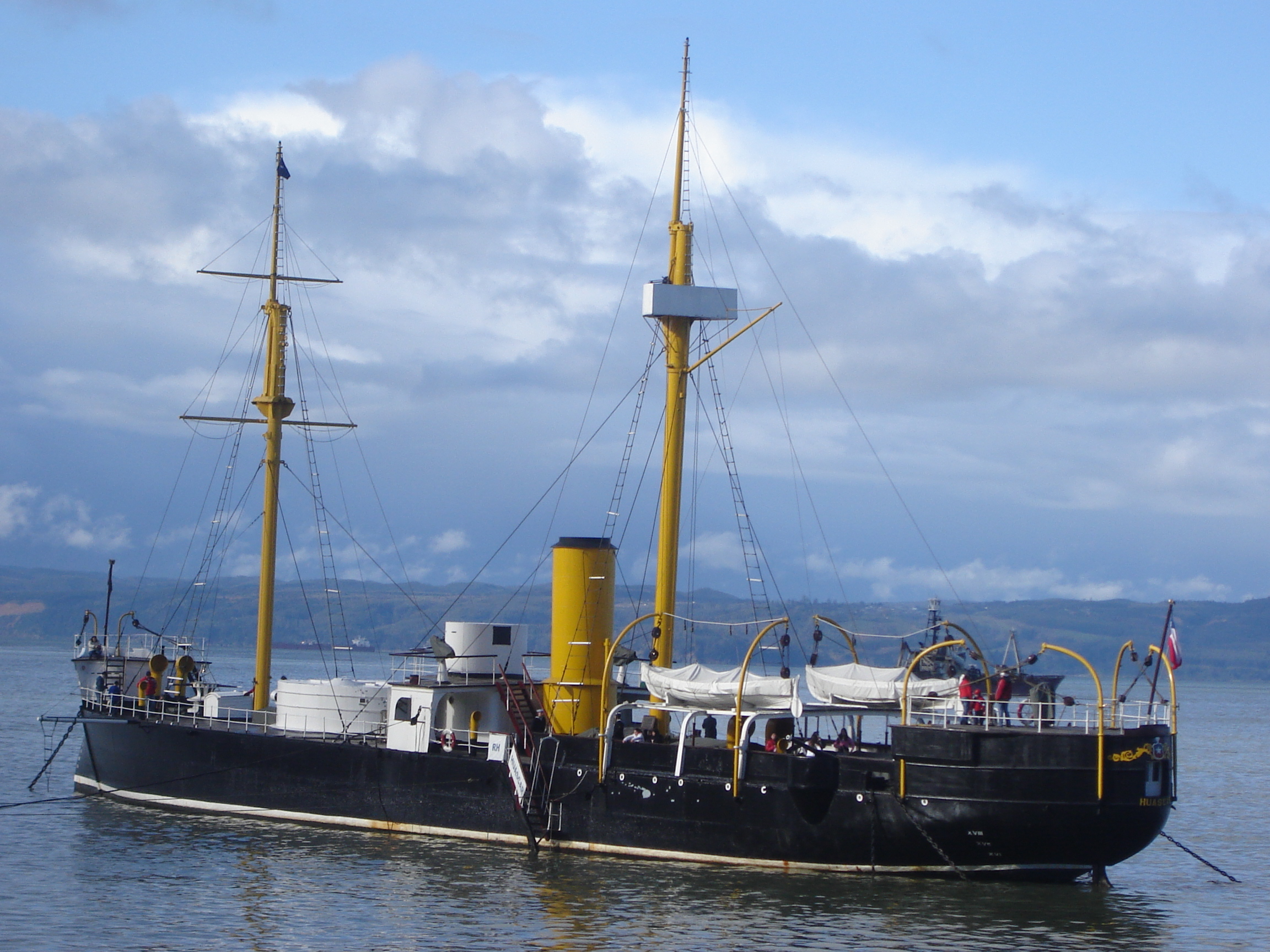
Huáscar anchored in the harbour at Talcahuano

A late example of a vessel modeled on Monitor was Huáscar, designed by Captain Cowper P. Coles, the advocate and developer of turret ships for the Royal Navy. Huáscar was one of many monitor designs to be equipped with a ram. She was built and launched in 1865 for the Peruvian Navy at Birkenhead, England.

Huáscar, under the command of Rear Admiral Miguel Grau, fought with distinction during the War of the Pacific. Huáscar successfully raided enemy sea lanes for several months and delayed an invasion of the Chilean Army into Peruvian territory until she was captured by the Chilean Navy at the Battle of Angamos in 1879. Once in Chilean hands, Huáscar fought a small battle with the Peruvian monitor Manco Capac, during the bombardment of Arica, where she was damaged; after the land battle was lost, the crew of the Manco Capac scuttled her to prevent capture.

Over the years, both Chile and Peru came to venerate the ship and the officers from both sides that died on her deck, either commanding her or boarding her, as national heroes. Huáscar is currently commissioned in the Chilean Navy, has been restored to a near-original condition and, as a museum ship, is open to visitors at its berth in Talcahuano.

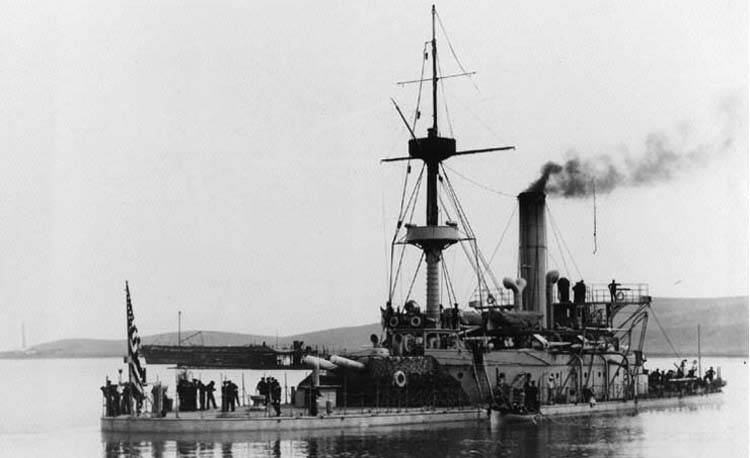
USS Monterey, a breastwork monitor, at Mare Island Naval Shipyard, c.1896. The older Ericsson-designed monitor USS Camanche is visible in the background.

=== 1884–1897 ===
In an effort to produce a more seaworthy vessel that was more capable in ship-to-shore combat, a type called the breastwork monitor became more common in the later nineteenth century. These ships had raised turrets and a heavier superstructure on a platform above the hull. They were still not particularly successful as seagoing ships, because of their short sailing range and the poor reliability of their steam engines. The first of these ships was HMVS Cerberus, built between 1868 and 1870. She was later sunk and used as a breakwater near Melbourne, Australia, and is still visible there, as her upper works project from the water.

=== Spanish–American War ===
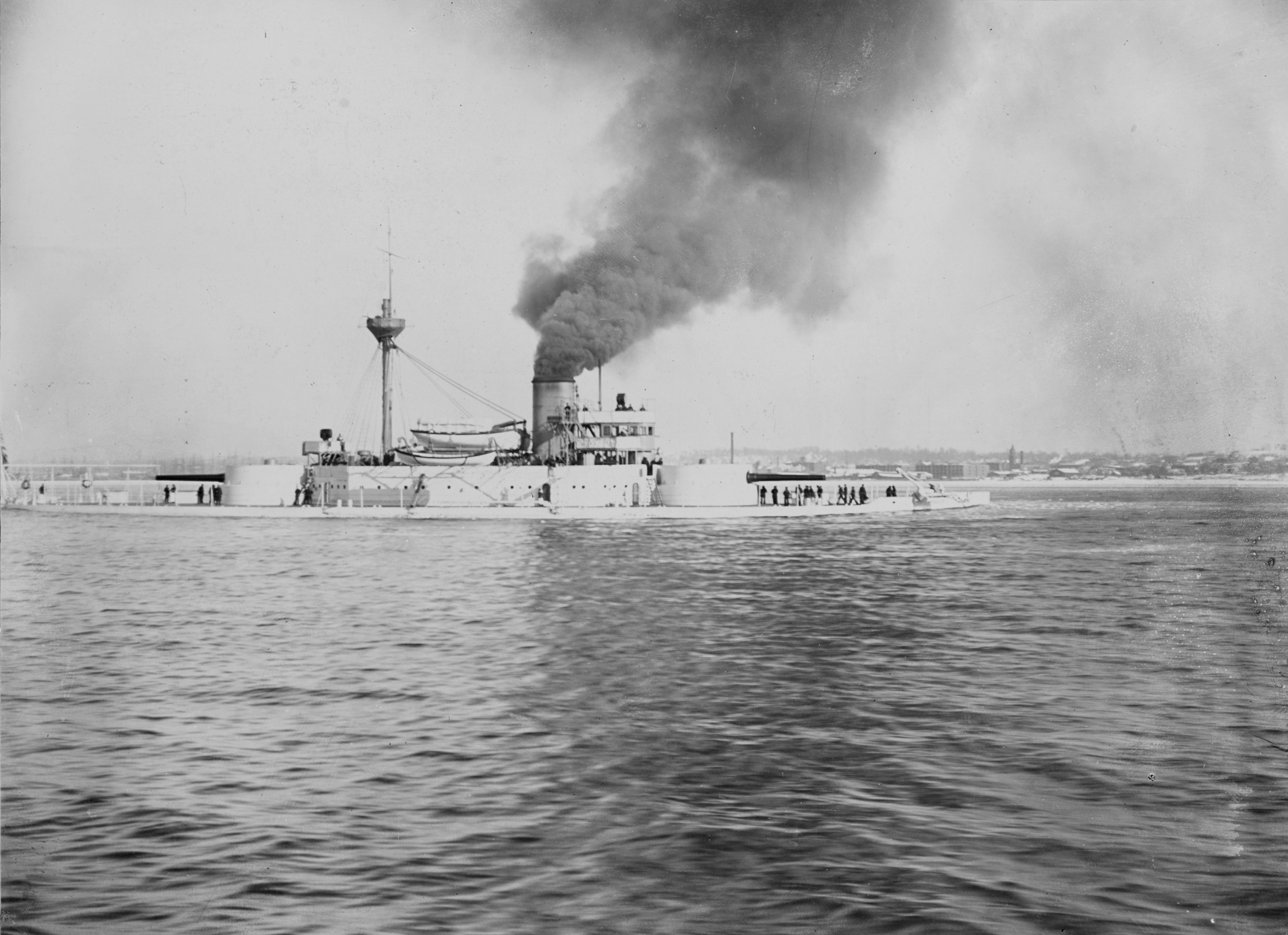
USS Puritan

Monitors were used frequently during the Spanish–American War in 1898. Notable United States Navy monitors which fought in the war were USS Amphitrite, USS Puritan, USS Monterey, and USS Terror. These four monitors fought at battles or campaigns such as the Bombardment of San Juan, the Battle of Fajardo, and the Philippines Campaign. Other monitors also participated in the conflict, including original Civil War ships. These were reactivated for coastal defence to allay fears about surprise Spanish raids, but this was pure political posturing as the ships were too slow and obsolete to have any military value.

== Twentieth century ==
=== World War I ===
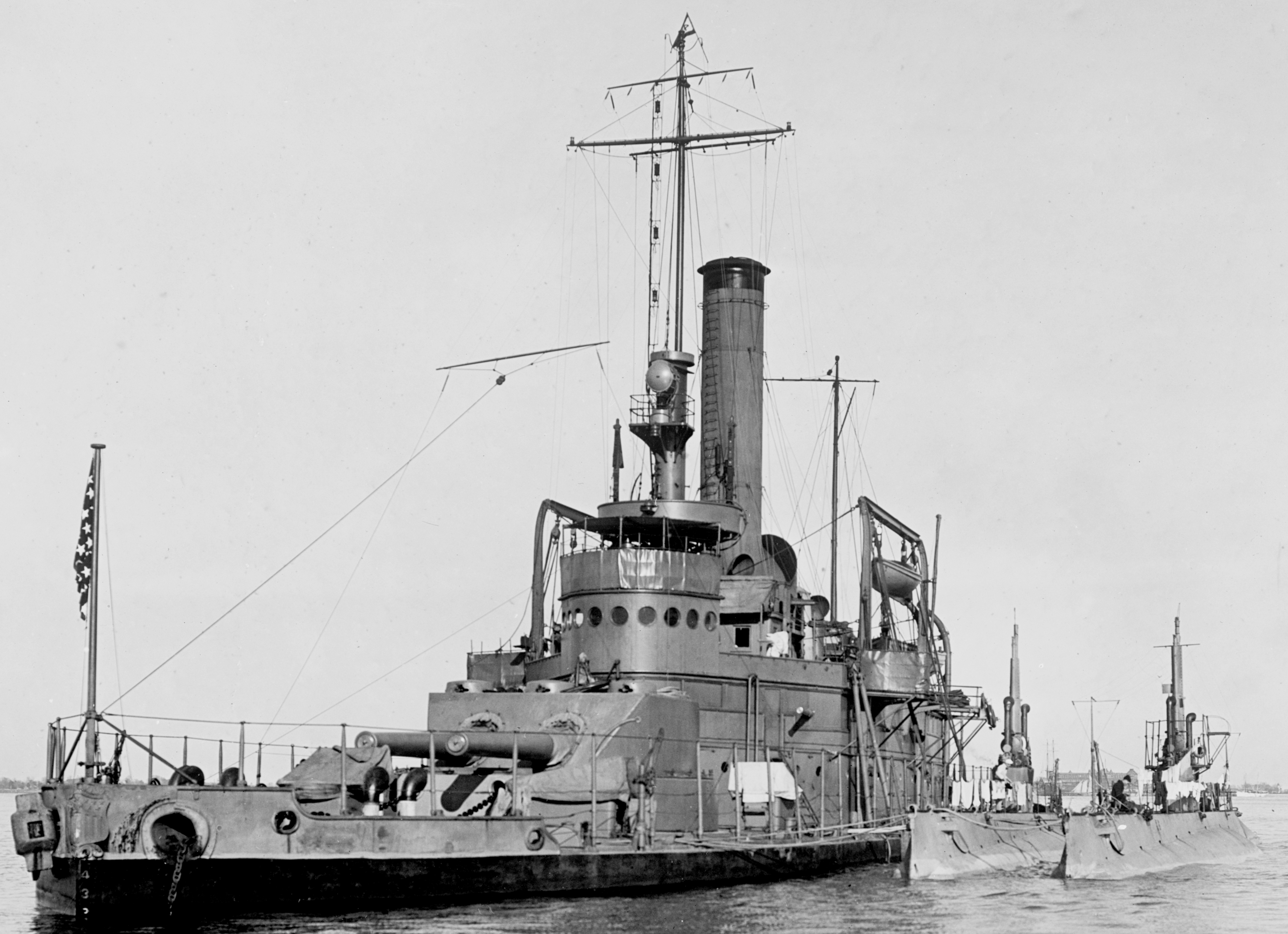
USS Tallahassee, formerly USS Florida, tending to submarines K-5 and K-6 in Hampton Roads, 1919

During World War I, the Royal Navy developed several classes of ships which were designed to give close support to troops ashore. Termed "monitors", they owed little to the monitors of the 19th century, though they shared the characteristics of poor seaworthiness, shallow draft and heavy armament in turrets.

The first class, the Humber class, had been laid down as large river gunboats for the Brazilian navy. Later monitor classes were equally makeshift; they were often designed for carrying whatever spare guns were available from ships scrapped or never built, with the hulls quickly designed and built in "cheap and cheerful" fashion. They were broad beamed for stability (beam was about 1/3 of the overall length) which together with a lack of emphasis on speed made them extremely slow, and they were not suitable for naval combat or any sort of work on the high seas. Monitors of the Royal Navy played a part in consolidating the left wing of the Western Front during the Race to the Sea in 1914.

In addition to these ships, several monitors were built during the course of the war. Their armament typically consisted of a turret taken from a de-commissioned pre-dreadnought battleship. These monitors were designed to be resilient against torpedo attacks—waterline bulges were incorporated into the Abercrombie class of 1915. As the war settled to its longer course, these heavier monitors formed patrols along with destroyers on either side of the Straits of Dover to exclude enemy surface vessels from the English Channel and keep the enemy in port. The monitors could also operate into the river mouths. HMS General Wolfe, one of the Lord Clive-class monitors, which had a single 18-inch (457 mm) gun added in 1918, was able to shell a bridge 20 miles (30 km) away near Ostend. Other RN monitors served in the Mediterranean.

The dimensions of the several classes of monitor varied greatly. Those of the Abercrombie class were 320 feet (98 m) by 90 feet (27 m) in the beam and drew 9 feet (2.7 m) compared to the M29-class monitors of 1915 that were only 170 feet (52 m) long, and the Erebus class of 1916, which were 405 feet (123 m) long. The largest monitors carried the heaviest guns.

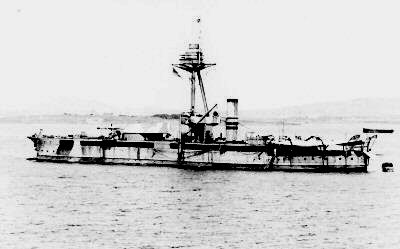
HMS Raglan

By this point the United States Navy had largely stopped using monitors. Only a few still existed, and only seven were still in service, all of which had been relegated to being submarine tenders. This would be the last war in which United States monitor-type vessels would see commissioned service. The last original American monitor, USS Wyoming, renamed USS Cheyenne in 1908, was removed from the Navy List in 1937.

The Austro-Hungarian Navy had also invested heavily in the construction of river monitors to patrol its internal river systems such as the Danube and its tributaries. These vessels were among the first to fire on Serbian territory at the start of the First World War, and took part in the bombardment of Belgrade, as well as other Balkan campaigns against Serbia and Romania. At the end of the war, the surviving vessels were parceled out to the navies of the new state of Yugoslavia and Romania as war prizes. Several would see action in World War II as well.

The Italian Navy also constructed some monitors including the Faa di Bruno, using the main gun barrels for the cancelled Francesco Caracciolo-class battleships.

=== World War II ===
The smaller Royal Navy monitors were mostly scrapped following World War I, though Erebus and Terror survived to fight in World War II. When the requirement for shore support returned, two large new Roberts-class monitors, Roberts and Abercrombie, were constructed and fitted with 15-inch (380 mm) guns from older battleships.

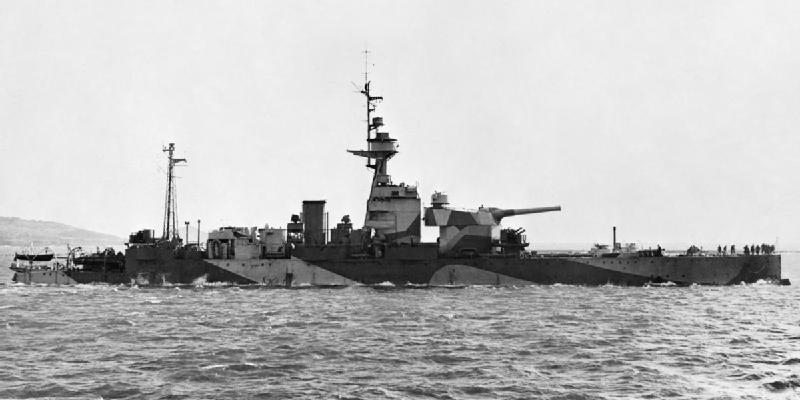
HMS Erebus during World War II

Royal Navy monitors saw service in the Mediterranean in support of the British Eighth Army's desert and Italian campaigns. They were part of the offshore bombardment for the Invasion of Normandy in 1944. They were also used to clear the German-mined River Scheldt by the British to utilize the port of Antwerp. Roberts and Abercrombie were to form part of the British East Indies Fleet in support of Operation Mailfist, the planned liberation of Singapore in late 1945, which was cancelled following the Japanese surrender.

The former Italian WWI monitor Faa di Bruno had been redesignated as floating battery by the beginning of WW2, in which role she continued to play until the capitulation of Italy. She was then captured by the Germans and served as monitor Biber in Genoa, until the German surrender. She was scrapped after the war.

The German, Yugoslav, Croatian and Romanian navies all operated river monitors on the Danube, all of which saw combat during the war.

=== Soviet river monitors ===
The Soviet Union built many monitors before World War II, and used them mostly on rivers and lakes. After experiences during WWI, the Russian Civil War and the Manchukuo Imperial Navy raids in the Far East, the Soviets developed a new monitor class for their river flotillas. The lead ship of the new series was Zheleznyakov, laid down in the Leninska Kuznia factory in Kiev in late 1934. Zheleznyakov is preserved as a museum and monument on the Dnieper.

=== 1946–1964 ===
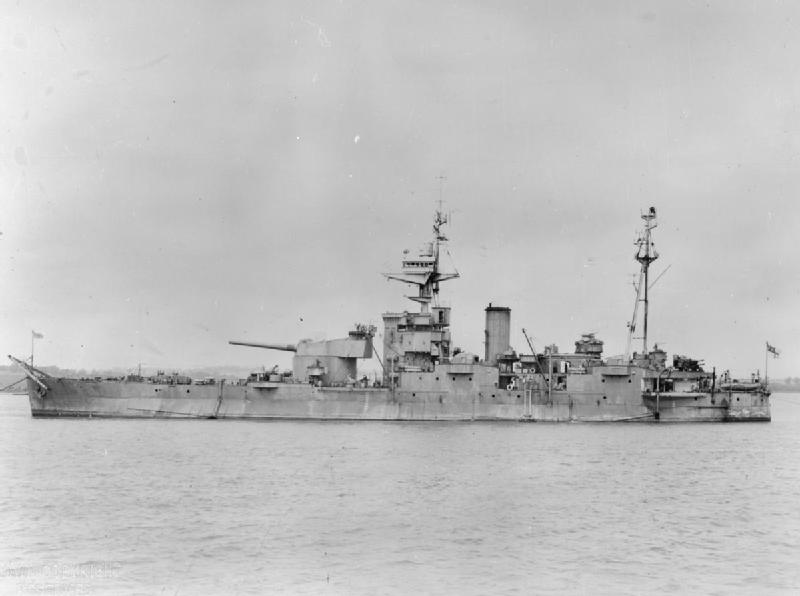
HMS Abercrombie, 1946

The Royal Navy still had HMS Abercrombie (completed 1943) and HMS Roberts (1941) in reserve in 1953. They were typical monitors, trunk-decked vessels, 373 feet (114 m) long overall, 90-foot (27 m) in the beam and with an 11-foot (3 m) mean draught carrying two 15-inch (381 mm) guns.

The Brazilian Navy presently operates the last true "monitor" as part of their inland waterway force, Parnaíba.

=== Vietnam War ===
The Vietnam War was the U.S. Navy's second riverine war, after the American Civil War. On 18 December 1965, the U.S. Navy, for the second time in a hundred years, authorized the reactivation of a brown-water navy, this time in South Vietnam. After studies were conducted, plans were drawn up by the U.S. Naval Advisory Group in February 1966, and by the summer of 1966 Secretary of Defense Robert S. McNamara authorized the U.S. Navy a Mobile Riverine Force (MRF).

Although U.S. Navy Patrol Craft Fast (Swift Boats), Patrol Boat River (PBRs) and assorted gunboats had been performing counter-insurgency operations in country prior to 1966, the allies were not gaining success in the Mekong Delta region. A stronger naval force was needed, one that was heavily armored, and heavily gunned.

The U.S. Navy's MRF initially consisted of River Assault Flotilla One, under Program 4 in 1967, and consisted of four River Assault Divisions: RAD-91 which contained 3 Monitors; RAD-92 contained 2 Monitors; RAD-111 had 3 Monitors; and RAD-112 operated 2 Monitors. These "river battleships", as they were known by the men, operated in conjunction with the CCB (Command Control Boat—also a monitor), ATCs Armored Troop Carrier (ATC) and the Assault Support Patrol Boats (ASPBs) which were also assigned to each RAD.

Vietnam Monitors were originally converted from World War II 56-foot (17 m) long all-steel Landing Craft Mechanized (LCM) Mark 6s. They were constructed under two phases: Programs 4 and 5. Under Program 4, 10 Monitors were armed with one 40 mm cannon and then fielded. Program 5 Monitors would correct any deficiencies from the previous vessels, and were fielded as the Monitor (H) 105 mm (Howitzer) and the Monitor (F) (Flamethrower). The Program 4 monitors mounted their single barrel 40 mm cannon in a Mk 52 turret; while the Program 5 monitors mounted their 105 mm cannon in a T172 turret, and the six flamethrowers were mounted in M8 cupola turrets (one on each side of the vessel's 40 mm turret). Because the U.S. Marine Corps was also using the M49 105 mm howitzer, there was a shortage, and only 8 Monitor (H) versions could be procured for the brown-water navy.

As fielded, the 24 monitors of the U.S. Navy in Vietnam averaged about 10 tons of armor, were about 60 feet (18 m) long, had two screws, were powered by two 64NH9 diesel engines, 8.5 knots (15.7 km/h; 9.8 mph) (maximum speed), 17.5 feet (5.3 m) wide, 3.5 feet (1.1 m) draft, and were normally manned by 11 crewmen. When South Vietnam fell on 30 April 1975, all monitors fell into the enemy's hands; leaving only one survivor, a training monitor, that never left the US. "Training" monitor #C-18 is on display, along with one Swift Boat and one PBR at the U.S. Naval Amphibious Base in Coronado, California.

== Similar vessels ==
=== River monitors ===
The monitor, by proving the efficacy of turrets over fixed guns, played a part in development of the dreadnought battleship from the ironclad. As a shallow draft vessel it also led to the river gunboats which were used by imperial powers to police their colonial possessions; indeed the largest and most heavily armed river gunboats became known as river monitors. They were used by several navies, including those of the United Kingdom, the United States and Japan.

=== Submarine gunboats ===
USS Monitor had had very little freeboard so as to bring the mass of the gun turret down, thereby increasing stability and making the boat a smaller and therefore harder target for gunfire. At the end of the American Civil War, the U.S. Navy Casco-class monitors had large ballast tanks that allowed the vessels to partially submerge during battle. This idea was carried further with the concept of the Royal Navy's R class of submarine gunboats.

The British M-class submarines were initially designed for shore bombardment, but their purpose was changed to attacking enemy merchant vessels as their 12-inch (305 mm) gun would be more effective at long range than a torpedo against a moving target. Only one, HMS M1, entered service before the end of World War 1; she was lost in the English Channel after the war in 1925 after being accidentally rammed while submerged: her gun came free of its mount and she was completely flooded.

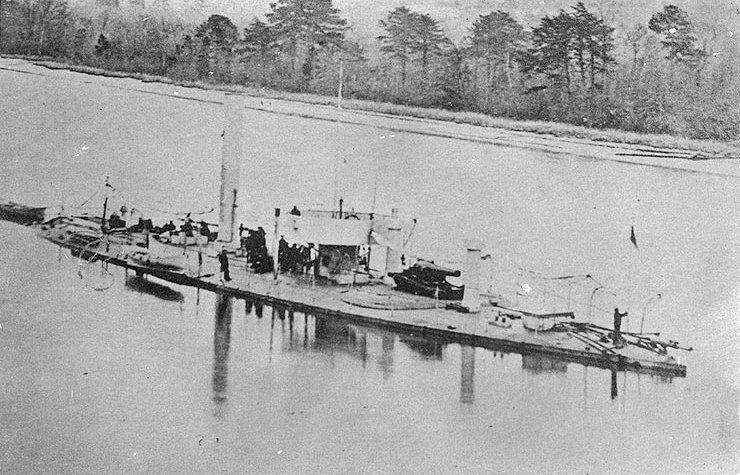
USS Casco in the James River, 1865

== Derivative uses of the name ==
To overcome the stability problems arising from the heavy turret mounted high in monitors, their hulls were designed to reduce other top weight. After Ericsson's ships, monitors developed the trunk deck design as the upper deck had to be heavily armoured against plunging shells. Because of the weight high in the hull, its breadth was minimized, giving rise to a vessel broad-beamed at the waterline, but with a narrow upper deck. The term for this sort of construction was tumblehome. Ships which were far narrower at the deck than the waterline were said to have a "pronounced tumblehome".

By analogy, nineteenth century railway coaches with clerestory roofs to accommodate ventilators and lamps above the heads of standing passengers in the centre while lower to the sides where passengers were seated were called monitors or monitor cars in the U.S.; the raised part of the roof was known as a turret. In ship design of around 1900, a turret deck was a more austere version of the trunk deck.

== Surviving vessels ==
- The Russian Strelets is an Uragan-class monitor built in 1864. The ship was identified as still afloat in St. Petersburg, Russia in 2015, and as of 2017 attempts are being made to restore her.
- The Peruvian Huáscar is a monitor built in England originally for Peru in 1865, which is still afloat in Talcahuano, Chile. Although her appearance has changed too much after the Battle of Angamos and has been reconstructed with replicas and parts of other ships.
- HMVS Cerberus, launched in 1868, was scuttled as a breakwater off the Australian coast in 1926. Work for her preservation is proceeding.
- HNLMS Schorpioen (1868) and HNLMS Buffel (1868) are Dutch ramming ship monitors preserved as museum ships.
- SMS Leitha (now "Lajta Monitor Múzeumhajó") is an Austro-Hungarian monitor built in 1871. Currently a museum ship.
- HSwMS Sölve is a Swedish monitor built in 1875 and designed by John Ericsson the "father" of all monitors. Currently in a Maritime Museum in Gothenburg, Sweden
- SMS Bodrog is an Austro-Hungarian monitor built 1904, said to have fired the first shots of the First World War. Currently a museum ship in Belgrade, Serbia.
- HMS M33 is an M29-class monitor of the Royal Navy built in 1915; she is preserved at Portsmouth Historic Dockyard in the United Kingdom.
- Parnaíba is a river monitor currently in service with the Brazilian navy.
- Three Mihail Kogălniceanu-class river monitors were launched by the Romanian Naval Forces in the 1990s and remain in service.
- The turret, steam engine and guns of USS Monitor were recovered from the wreck in 2002 and are undergoing conservation at the Mariners' Museum. Since 2022, marine archaeologists are continuing to investigate and survey the sunken remains of the hull.

== See also ==
- List of monitors of the Royal Navy
  - Abercrombie class. HMS Abercrombie mentioned above was of the later Roberts class.
  - Erebus class
  - Lord Clive class
  - Marshal Ney class
  - M29 class An example of this class is HMS M33.
  - Roberts class
- Gunboat
- The Dover Patrol
- Coastal defence ship
- List of monitors of the United States Navy
- List of monitors of the Swedish Navy
- List of monitors of the Netherlands
- List of monitors of the Second World War
- List of coastal defence ships of the Second World War
