= SS Blommersdijk =

Dutch-owned cargo ship that was sunk by a German U-boat in WW1

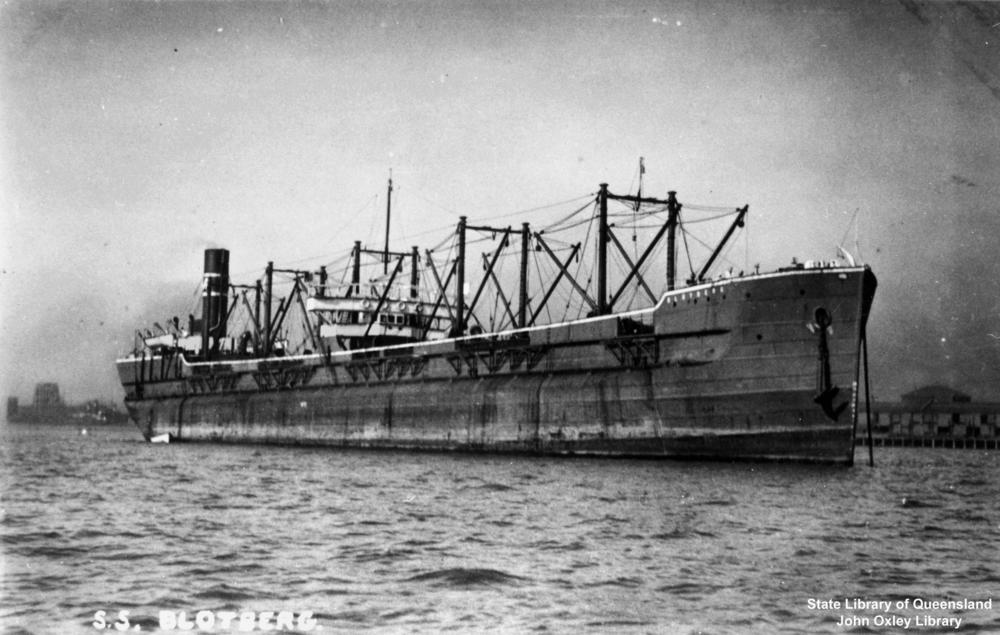
- The ship as Blötberg, with her funnel in Wm. H. Müller & Co colours, between 1907 and 1916

History

Netherlands
- Name: 1907: Blötberg; 1916: Blommersdijk
- Namesake: 1907: Blötberget
- Owner: 1907: Wm. H. Müller & Co; 1916: Holland America Line
- Port of registry: Rotterdam
- Route: 1907: Oxelösund – Rotterdam
- Builder: Wm Doxford & Sons, Sunderland
- Yard number: 387
- Launched: 15 February 1907
- Completed: 30 May 1907
- Identification: 1907: code letters NHBJ; 1916: code letters NHBK
- Fate: Sunk 8 October 1916

General characteristics
- Type: turret deck ship
- Tonnage: 4,835 GRT, 3,102 NRT, 3,102 DWT
- Length: 394.4 ft (120.2 m)
- Beam: 51.6 ft (15.7 m)
- Depth: 23.8 ft (7.3 m)
- Decks: 1
- Installed power: 291 NHP, 1,900 ihp (1,400 kW)
- Propulsion: 1 × screw; 1 × triple-expansion engine
- Speed: 10 knots (19 km/h; 12 mph)
- Capacity: 341,000 cu ft (9,700 m^{3}) grain; 326,000 cu ft (9,200 m^{3}) bale
- Crew: 40

SS Blommersdijk was a Dutch-owned turret deck ship that was built in England in 1907 as Blötberg. In January 1916 Holland America Line (NASM) bought her and renamed her Blommersdijk. In October 1916 a German U-boat stopped her in the Atlantic Ocean, inspected her cargo, ordered her crew to abandon ship, and sank her. Germany admitted it had been wrong to sink the ship, and paid full compensation.

This was the first of two NASM ships to be called Blommersdijk. The second was built in 1922, and in 1946 the spelling of her name was anglicised to Blommersdyk.

== Building ==
William Doxford & Sons built the ship in Pallion, Sunderland, as yard number 387. She was launched on 15 February 1907. Sources differ as to whether she was completed that March, or on 30 May. Her registered length was 394.4 ft (120.2 m), her beam was 51.6 ft (15.7 m) and her depth was 23.8 ft (7.3 m). Her tonnages were 4,835 gross register tons (GRT), 3,102 net register tons (NRT) and 3,102 tons deadweight (DWT). Her holds had capacity for 341,000 cubic feet (9,700 m^{3}) of grain, or 326,000 cubic feet (9,200 m^{3}) of baled cargo. She had five pairs of masts, with derricks to work her cargo holds.

The ship had a single screw, driven by a three-cylinder triple-expansion engine built by Doxford. It was rated at 291 nominal horsepower or 1,900 indicated horsepower (1,400 kW), and gave her a speed of 10 knots (19 km/h; 12 mph).

== Ownership ==
Blötberg's first owner was Wm. H. Müller & Co, who registered her at Rotterdam. Her code letters were NHBJ. Müller bought the ship to carry iron ore from the port of Oxelösund in Sweden. She was named after the Swedish village of Blötberget, where the ore was mined, 150 miles (240 km) northwest of Oxelösund.

On 27 January 1916, NASM bought two turret deck ships from Müller & Co: Blötberg, and the larger Grängesberg, and renamed them Blommersdijk and Beukelsdijk respectively. Blommersdijk's code letters were changed to NHBK. NASM planned to use her to carry grain.

== Loss ==
On 8 October 1916 Blommersdijk left New York carrying 6,000 tons of wheat for the Dutch government, and 400 tons of general cargo, including motor vehicle parts, for the Nederlandsche Overzee Trust Maatschappij. At about 17:00 hrs that afternoon, east of the Nantucket Lightship, U-53 ordered Blommersdijk to stop to be inspected. Blommersdijk had orders to proceed via Kirkwall in Orkney. U-53's commander, Hans Rose, wrongly took this as a reason to sink her.

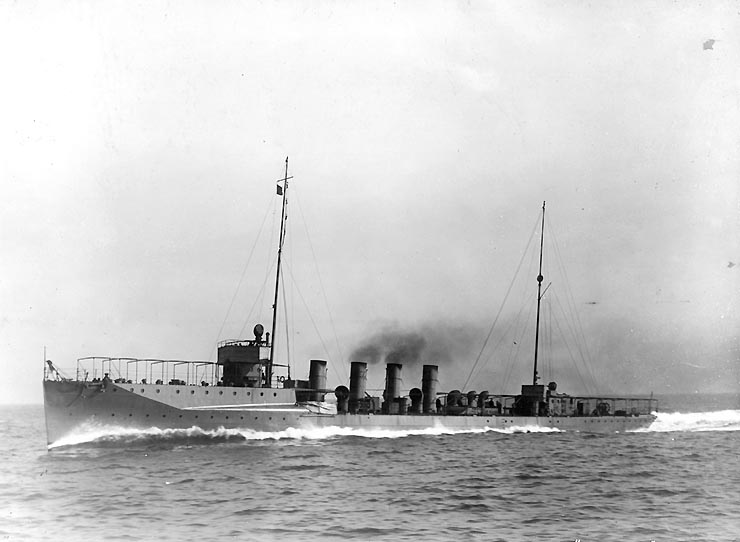
USS Benham, which rescued Blommersdijk's crew

Blommersdijk's crew was ordered to abandon ship. A boarding party from U-53 detonated scuttling charges aboard her, but she stayed afloat. U-53 then opened fire on her with its two 88 mm deck guns, and fired one torpedo at her. Blommersdijk sank at 20:40 hrs, at position 40°40′00″N 69°36′30″W. U-53 left Blommersdijk's 40 crew members in their lifeboats, and the destroyer USS Benham rescued them. Germany later admitted that Rose had been wrong to sink Blommersdijk, and paid full compensation for both the ship and her cargo.

== Bibliography ==
- Gray, Leonard; Lingwood, John (1975). The Doxford Turret Ships. Kendal: World Ship Society. ISBN 978-0950004464.
- Lloyd's Register of British and Foreign Shipping. Vol. I.–Steamers. London: Lloyd's Register of Shipping. 1907 – via Internet Archive.
