= SS Querimba =

One of the largest turret-deck ships ever built

History
- Name: 1905: Querimba; 1923: Maria Enrica
- Owner: 1905: British India SN Co; 1923: E Bozzo & L Mortola
- Port of registry: 1905: (United Kingdom of Great Britain and Ireland) Glasgow; 1923: (Kingdom of Italy) Genoa
- Builder: Wm Doxford & Sons, Pallion
- Cost: £70,300
- Yard number: 339
- Launched: 3 June 1905
- Completed: 10 July 1905
- Identification: UK official number 121245; 1905: code letters HCVJ; by 1918: call sign GOB; 1923: code letters NXOG
- Fate: scrapped 1933

General characteristics
- Class & type: Q-class turret deck ship
- Tonnage: 7,696 GRT, 4,937 NRT, 12,093 DWT
- Length: 455.3 ft (138.8 m)
- Beam: 58.2 ft (17.7 m)
- Draught: 26 ft 2 in (7.98 m)
- Depth: 30.2 ft (9.2 m)
- Decks: 1
- Installed power: 413 NHP, 2,700 ihp
- Propulsion: 1 × triple-expansion engine; 1 × screw
- Speed: 11 knots (20 km/h)
- Notes: sister ships: Queda, Quiloa

SS Querimba was one of the largest turret deck ships ever built. She was launched in England in 1905, renamed Maria Enrica in 1923, and scrapped in Italy in 1933. She was one of three sister ships that William Doxford & Sons built for the British India Steam Navigation Company (BI) in 1905. They were the only turret deck ships BI ever owned. It used them as bulk carriers.

She was the first of two BI ships to be called Querimba. The second was a steamship that was built in 1925, sold and renamed in 1951, and scrapped in 1966.

== Building ==
In 1905 Doxford at Pallion on the River Wear in Sunderland built three turret deck ships for BI. Yard number 337 was launched on 18 April, completed on 17 May, and registered as Queda. Yard number 339 was launched on 3 June, completed on 10 July, and registered as Querimba. Yard number 341 was launched on 20 July, completed on 23 August, and registered as Quiloa.

Querimba cost £70,300. Her registered length was 455.3 ft (138.8 m), her beam was 58.2 ft (17.7 m), her depth was 30.2 ft (9.2 m) and her draught was 26 ft 2 in (7.98 m). Her tonnages were 7,696 GRT, 4,937 NRT, and 12,093 DWT.

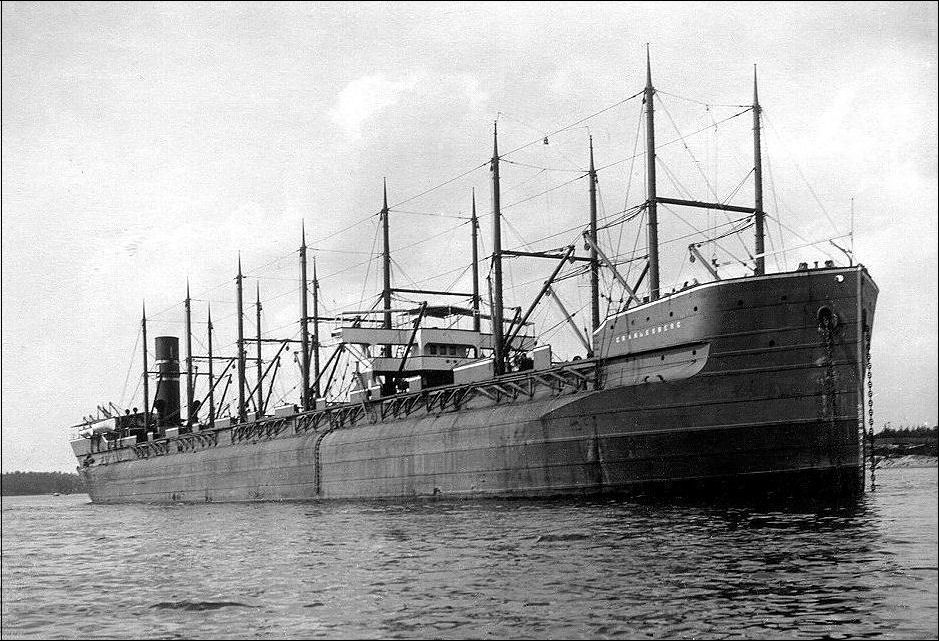
Grängesberg, which the Q-class eclipsed as the largest turret deck ships ever built

Queda, Querimba and Quiloa were the largest turret deck ships ever built. Previously the largest was Grängesberg, which Doxford built in 1903. Grängesberg was almost 4 feet (1.2 m) broader than the Q-class, but the Q-class were 15 feet (5 m) longer and about 4 feet (1.2 m) deeper than Grängesberg.

She had a single screw, driven by a three-cylinder triple-expansion engine. It was rated at 413 NHP or 2,700 ihp, and gave her a speed of 11 knots (20 km/h). Her engine room and single funnel were positioned aft. Her bridge superstructure was positioned about two-thirds of the way forward. She had two masts.

== Career ==
BI registered Querimba at Glasgow. Her United Kingdom official number was 121245, and her code letters were HCVJ.

Querimba and her two sisters all traded in the Indian Ocean. They carried bulk cargoes such as coal, sugar, and grain such as rice. Between 1917 and 1919 they all came under the Liner Requisition Scheme.

By 1918 Querimba was equipped for wireless telegraphy. Her call sign was GOB.

In 1923 BI sold all three of its turret deck ships. An Italian owner bought Queda for £8,300, ran her briefly, and sold her in 1924 for scrap. A Japanese owner bought Quiloa for £12,000 and renamed her Kobe Maru. She grounded in 1924, was refloated in 1925, and scrapped.

On 19 June 1923 Emanuele Bozzo and Luigi Mortola bought Querimba for £11,000. They renamed her Maria Enrica and registered her in Genoa. Her code letters were NXOG. She outlived her two sisters by several years, and was scrapped in Genoa in the second quarter of 1933.

== Bibliography ==
- Gray, Leonard; Lingwood, John (1975). The Doxford Turret Ships. Kendal: World Ship Society. ISBN 0-9500044-6-4.
- Haws, Duncan (1987). British India S.N. Co. Merchant Fleets. Vol. 11. Burwash: Travel Creatours Ltd Publications. ISBN 0-946378-07-X.
- Lloyd's Register of Shipping. Vol. I.–Steamers. London: Lloyd's Register of Shipping. 1906 – via Internet Archive.
- Lloyd's Register of Shipping. Vol. II.–Steamers and Motorships. London: Lloyd's Register of Shipping. 1924 – via Internet Archive.
- The Marconi Press Agency Ltd (1918). The Year Book of Wireless Telegraphy and Telephony. London: The Wireless Press, Ltd.
- Mercantile Navy List. London. 1906 – via Crew List Index Project.
