= Brazilian monitor Parnaíba =

River monitor of the Brazilian Navy

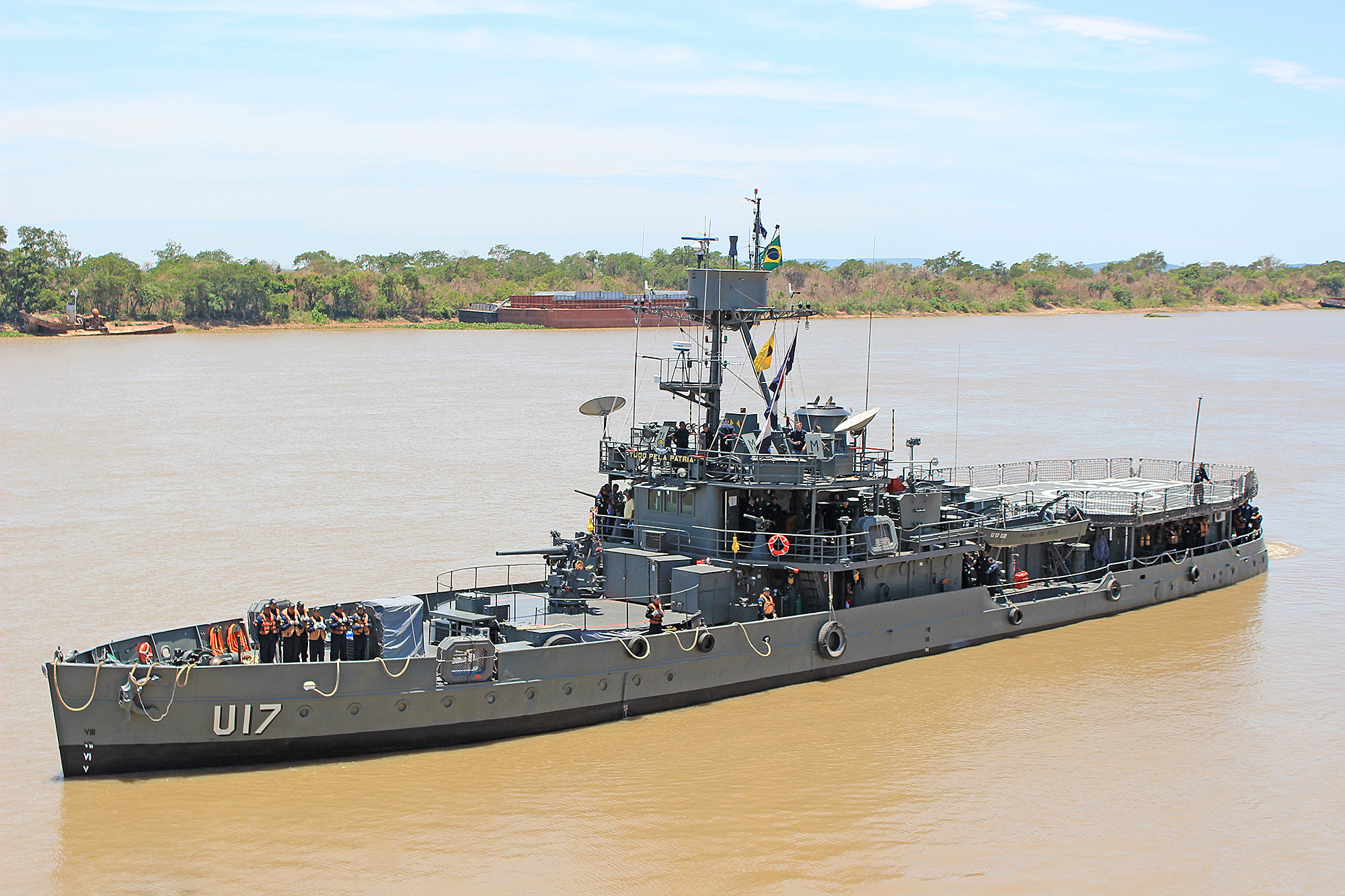

History

Brazil
- Name: Parnaíba
- Namesake: Parnaíba
- Builder: Arsenal de Marinha do Rio de Janeiro
- Laid down: 11 June 1936
- Launched: 2 September 1937
- Commissioned: 9 March 1938
- Home port: Rio de Janeiro
- Nickname(s): Jaú do Pantanal ("Jaú of the Pantanal"); Caverna Mestra da Armada ("The Oldhead of the Armada"); Velho Barco ("Old Boat")
- Status: in active service
- Badge

General characteristics
- Type: River monitor
- Displacement: 620 tons - Standard; 720 tons - full load
- Length: 55 m (180.4 ft)
- Beam: 10.1 m (33.1 ft)
- Draught: 1.6 m (5.2 ft)
- Propulsion: two Cummins-Wärstila CW-6-170 diesel engines of 925HP each, coupled to two shafts, driving fixed-pitch propellers protected by tunnels
- Speed: 12 knots (22 km/h)
- Range: 3,800 nmi (4,400 mi; 7,000 km) 10 knots (19 km/h)
- Endurance: 16 days; 90 tons of fuel
- Complement: 74
- Sensors & processing systems: 1 Furuno 3600 navigation radar and 1 Decca navigation radar
- Armament: 1 × Mark 22 76mm cannon; 2 × Bofors 40 mm/L70 automatic cannons; 6 × Oerlikon 20 mm L/70; 2 × Armstrong Whitworth 47 mm cannon (for gun salute only)
- Aviation facilities: Helipad

Parnaíba (U-17) (Portuguese pronunciation: [paʁnaˈibɐ]) is a river monitor of the Brazilian Navy. She is currently one of the last monitors in service.

== History ==
She was built for the navy in Rio de Janeiro and commissioned on 9 March 1938. She participated in the Second World War and is, as of 2026, one of the world's oldest commissioned warships still in active service. She is assigned to the Mato Grosso flotilla.

During the Second World War, the ship was assigned for service in the port of Salvador, Bahia, where she underwent light escort missions and coastal patrols against the threat of German submarines, mainly because of her extremely shallow draft which in theory would let any torpedo attack pass under her without any damage to the ship. For this purpose, it underwent several modifications, receiving chutes for depth charges, having its 152 mm cannon replaced by a 120 mm cannon, removing the mortars for the installation of two 20 mm anti-aircraft guns, in addition to the installation of four more cannons of the same type. Her escort missions were mainly in coastal waters because of her poor seaworthiness in open waters, which necessitated constant repairs on the ship.

== Modernization ==
In 1959, the 120 mm cannon was replaced by a 76mm cannon, which offered a higher rate of fire, greater accuracy, and ample ammunition. She underwent a modernisation program at the Ladario Riverine Naval Base between January 1998 and 6 May 1999, The steam engines that generated 1,300 hp were replaced by 2 diesel engines of 925 hp each. This considerably increased its range, which increased from 1,350 to 3,800 nautical miles (2,500 to 7,000 km), and its autonomy, which jumped from 3 to 16 days. One of her original engines was placed on display at the Sixth Naval District's Lieutenant Maximiano Memorial Hall. A helicopter platform has been fitted over the fantail, allowing her to operate the UH-12 Eurocopter AS350, which is used by the 1st General Purpose Helicopter Squadron of the West (HU-61). Between 2004 and 2011, the squadron operated the IH-6B Bell Jet Ranger III. In 2010, the IH-6B were transferred to the 1st Helicopter Training Squadron (HI-1) and the HU-61 resumed operating the UH-12. In the combat systems, the Bofors 40mm L/60 guns were replaced by L/70 guns, which were removed from the Frigate Liberal during its modernization program. In addition, it received Furuno 3600 and Decca radars, new communication systems and a new electro-hydraulic steering system. In 2023, protection was installed on the 76mm cannon.

== Original characteristics ==
- Propulsion: Thornycroft system of two (oil-fired) boilers and two triple-expansion steam engines, generating 1,300 HP, coupled to two shafts, driving fixed-pitch propellers protected by tunnels.
- Speeds: maximum of 11.5 knots at 320 rpm and economical speed of 9 knots at 235 rpm.
- Autonomy: 3 days and 14 hours at 11.5 knots and 5 days and 16 hours at 9 knots.
- Protection: vertical at the waterline of 3 inches (“non-cemented steel”), vertical in vital areas of 1.5 and 1 inch, and horizontal of 1.5 inches (special steel).
- Armament: 1 x 152mm (6-inch) gun, 2 x 47mm guns and 2 x 87mm mortars.
