= USS Beukelsdijk =

Dutch-owned cargo ship that was requisitioned for the US Navy in WW1

Coordinates: 67.00°N 13.40°E

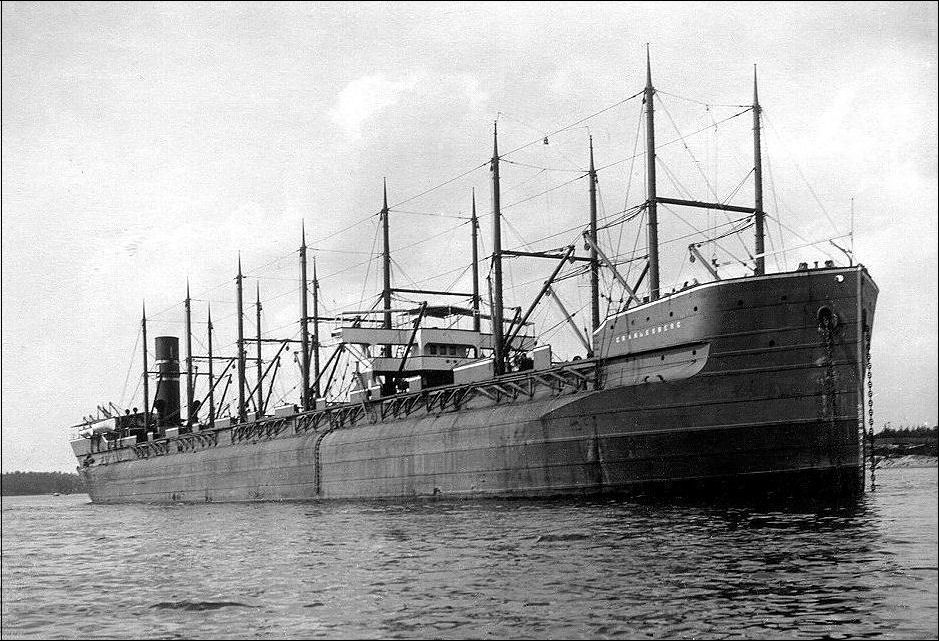
- The ship as Grängesberg, with her smokestack in Wm. H. Müller & Co colors, between 1903 and 1916

History

Netherlands
- Name: 1903: Grängesberg; 1916: Beukelsdijk
- Namesake: 1903: Grängesberg; 1916: Beukelsdijk
- Owner: 1903: Wm. H. Müller & Co; 1916: Holland America Line
- Operator: (United States) US Navy (1918–19)
- Port of registry: (Netherlands) Rotterdam
- Route: 1903: Oxelösund – Rotterdam
- Builder: Wm Doxford & Sons, Sunderland
- Yard number: 305
- Launched: 14 March 1903
- Completed: April 1903
- Acquired: by US Government, 20 March 1918
- Commissioned: into US Navy, 21 March 1918
- Decommissioned: from US Navy, 19 May 1919
- Identification: 1903: code letters NVCL; 1916: code letters NGWQ; 1918: ID number ID–3135
- Fate: Wrecked 29 January 1923

General characteristics
- Type: turret deck ship
- Tonnage: 6,749 GRT, 4,370 NRT, 10,530 DWT
- Displacement: 13,740 long tons (13,960 t)
- Length: 440.2 ft (134.2 m)
- Beam: 62.0 ft (18.9 m)
- Draft: 23 ft (7.0 m) (mean)
- Depth: 26.0 ft (7.9 m)
- Depth of hold: 29 ft (8.8 m)
- Decks: 1
- Installed power: 370 NHP, 2,200 ihp
- Propulsion: 1 × screw; 1 × triple-expansion engine
- Speed: 10 to 10 1/2 knots (18.5 to 19.4 km/h)
- Capacity: 488,000 cu ft (13,800 m^{3}) grain, 452,000 cu ft (12,800 m^{3}) bale
- Complement: in US Navy, 62
- Armament: 1 × 3-inch/50-caliber gun; 2 × 6-pounder guns

USS Beukelsdijk was a Dutch-owned turret deck ship that was built in England in 1903 as Grängesberg. She was renamed Beukelsdijk in 1916 when she changed owners. In 1918 she was requisitioned as USS Beukelsdijk, with the Naval Registry Identification Number ID–3135. She returned to civilian service in 1919, and was wrecked in the Norwegian Sea in 1923.

== Building ==
William Doxford & Sons built the ship in Pallion, Sunderland, as yard number 305. She was launched on 14 March 1903 as Grängesberg and completed that April. Her registered length was 440.2 ft (134.2 m), her beam was 62.0 ft (18.9 m) and her depth was 26.0 ft (7.9 m). Her tonnages were 6,749 GRT, 4,370 NRT, 10,530 DWT. Her holds had capacity for 488,000 cu ft (13,800 m^{3}) of grain, or 452,000 cu ft (12,800 m^{3}) of baled cargo. She had seven pairs of masts, with derricks to work her cargo holds.

The ship had a single screw, driven by a three-cylinder triple-expansion engine built by Doxford. It was rated at 370 NHP or 2,200 ihp, and gave her a speed of 10 to 10 1/2 knots (18.5 to 19.4 km/h).

When completed in 1903, Grängesberg was the largest single-deck cargo ship in the World. She was eclipsed in 1905 when Doxford completed the Q-class bulk carriers Queda, Querimba, and Quiloa for the British India Steam Navigation Company. The Q-class were the largest turret deck ships ever built.

== Owners and early career ==
Grängesberg's first owner was William H. Müller & Co, who registered her at Rotterdam. Her code letters were NVCL. Müller bought the ship to carry iron ore from the port of Oxelösund in Sweden. She was named after the Swedish town of Grängesberg, where the ore was mined, 150 miles (240 km) northwest of Oxelösund.

On 2 June 1907, while en route from Oxelösund to Rotterdam, Grängesberg ran aground off Falsterbo in southern Sweden. She was refloated on 4 July. On 12 February 1912 Grängesberg collided with the Dutch fishing trawler Barendsz in fog in the North Sea.

On 27 January 1916 Holland America Line (NASM) bought two turret deck ships from Müller & Co: Grängesberg, and the smaller Blötberg, and renamed them Beukelsdijk and Blommersdijk respectively. Beukelsdijk's code letters were changed to NGWQ.

On 3 March 1917, when anchored in Halifax Bay in a storm, Beukelsdijk was stranded. She was later refloated.

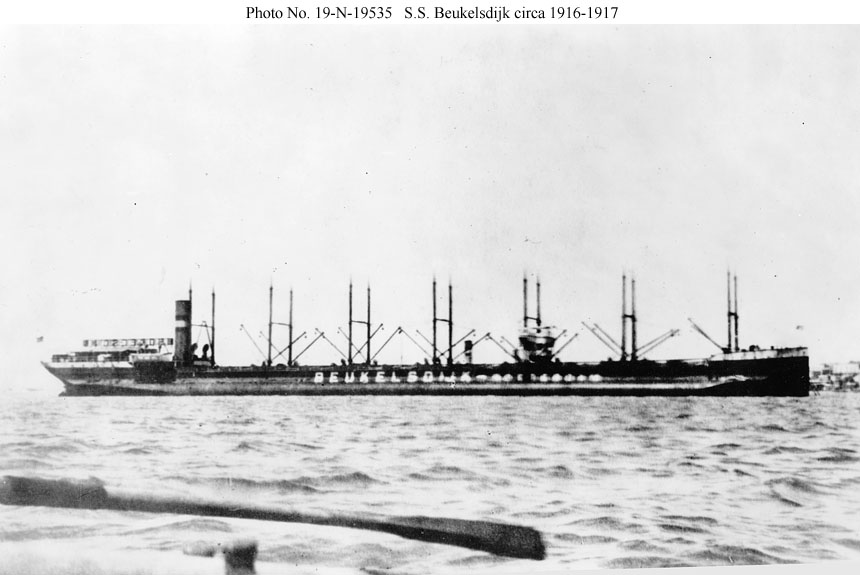
The ship as Beukelsdijk sometime between January 1916 and March 1918, with her smokestack in Holland America Line colors, and with Dutch neutrality markings on her side

== USS Beukelsdijk ==
On 20 March 1918 the US government seized Beukelsdijk under angary in the Port of San Juan, Puerto Rico. The next day she was commissioned into the US Navy as USS Beukelsdijk, with the Naval Regstry Identification Number ID–3135. At first she was commanded by an ensign, Frank L Stiles, of the National Naval Volunteers. In due course she was defensively armed with one 3-inch/50-caliber gun and two 6-pounder guns.

Beukelsdijk was assigned to the Naval Overseas Transportation Service (NOTS). She took coal to Brazil, calling at Bahia, Santos and Rio de Janeiro. On 4 June 1918 she left Rio de Janeiro carrying a cargo of coffee. On 6 July she reached New York, where she discharged her cargo and underwent repairs.

After being repaired, Beukelsdijk loaded 1,680 tons of bulk oil, 818 tons of general cargo, and aeroplane parts, and went from New York to Hampton Roads, where she joined a convoy to France. Her engine failed four times during the transatlantic crossing, but she resumed the voyage under her own power. On 26 July she reached Brest, where her boilers and engines were repaired. She then continued to Saint-Nazaire, where she discharged her cargo, and then took on ballast for her return crossing.

Spanish flu broke out among her crew, causing her to delay sailing. on 13 October Beukelsdijk left St-Nazaire for Quiberon Bay, where she disembarked her sick crew members to the naval hospital there. On 16 October a fire was discovered in her coal bunkers. Her crew unloaded enough coal to extinguish the fire, which took until 18 October. A week later the ship left Quiberon Bay to return across the Atlantic. From 2 to 9 November she stopped at the Azores. On 23 November she reached New York, where she underwent lengthy repairs.

On 5 January 1919 Beukelsdijk left New York, and on 13 January she reached Galveston, Texas, where she loaded a cargo of cotton and oil. She crossed the Atlantic to Le Havre, where she arrived on 28 January. While her cargo was being unloaded, she suffered a boiler explosion, which killed two of her crew. The NOTS cancelled her return voyage to the US, and on 24 April she left Le Havre for Rotterdam, where on 19 May she was decommissioned, stricken from the Navy List, and returned to her owners.

== Later career and loss ==
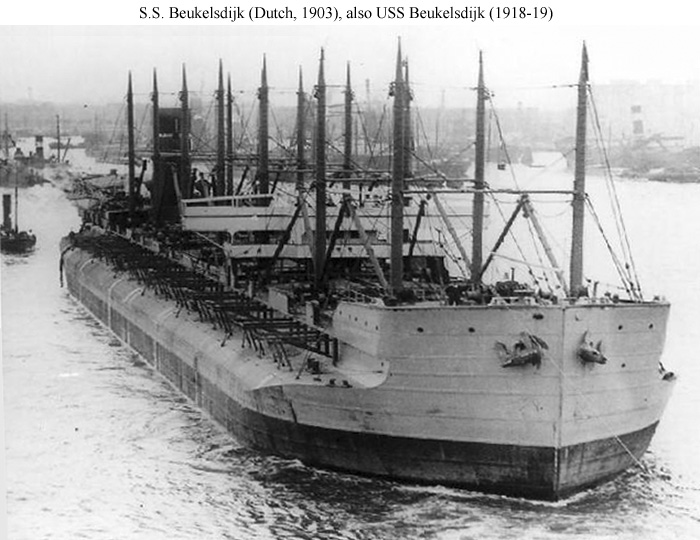
The ship as Grängesberg, between 1903 and 1916, possibly in Rotterdam

Beukelsdijk resumed merchant service with Holland America Line. By 1921 she was equipped for wireless telegraphy.

In January 1923 she was sailing in ballast from Rotterdam to Narvik. On the night of 28–29 January she was steaming at a full 10 knots (19 km/h) along the coast of Norway. At 03:18 hrs she passed Støtt, and ten minutes later passed Kuna. At 03:35 visibility became very poor, and the pilot dared not continue.

Shortly afterward her starboard side struck rocks. She was refloated at 04:15 hrs, but an accident in her engine room made her unmaneuverable. She quickly made water in holds 2, 4, 5 and 6, and her boiler room was flooded. It was impossible to anchor. She drifted onto the rocks, and listed to port at 06:00 hrs. All of her crew abandoned ship and reached land safely. The ship could not be salvaged, and within a few months her wreck broke up.

== Bibliography ==
- Gray, Leonard; Lingwood, John (1975). The Doxford Turret Ships. Kendal: World Ship Society. ISBN 978-0950004464.
- Lloyd's Register of British and Foreign Shipping. Vol. I.–Steamers. London: Lloyd's Register of Shipping. 1905 – via Internet Archive.
- Lloyd's Register of Shipping. Vol. II.–Steamers. London: Lloyd's Register of Shipping. 1919 – via Internet Archive.
- Lloyd's Register of Shipping. Vol. II.–Steamers. London: Lloyd's Register of Shipping. 1921 – via Internet Archive.
