= USS Casco (1864) =

Torpedo boat of the United States Navy

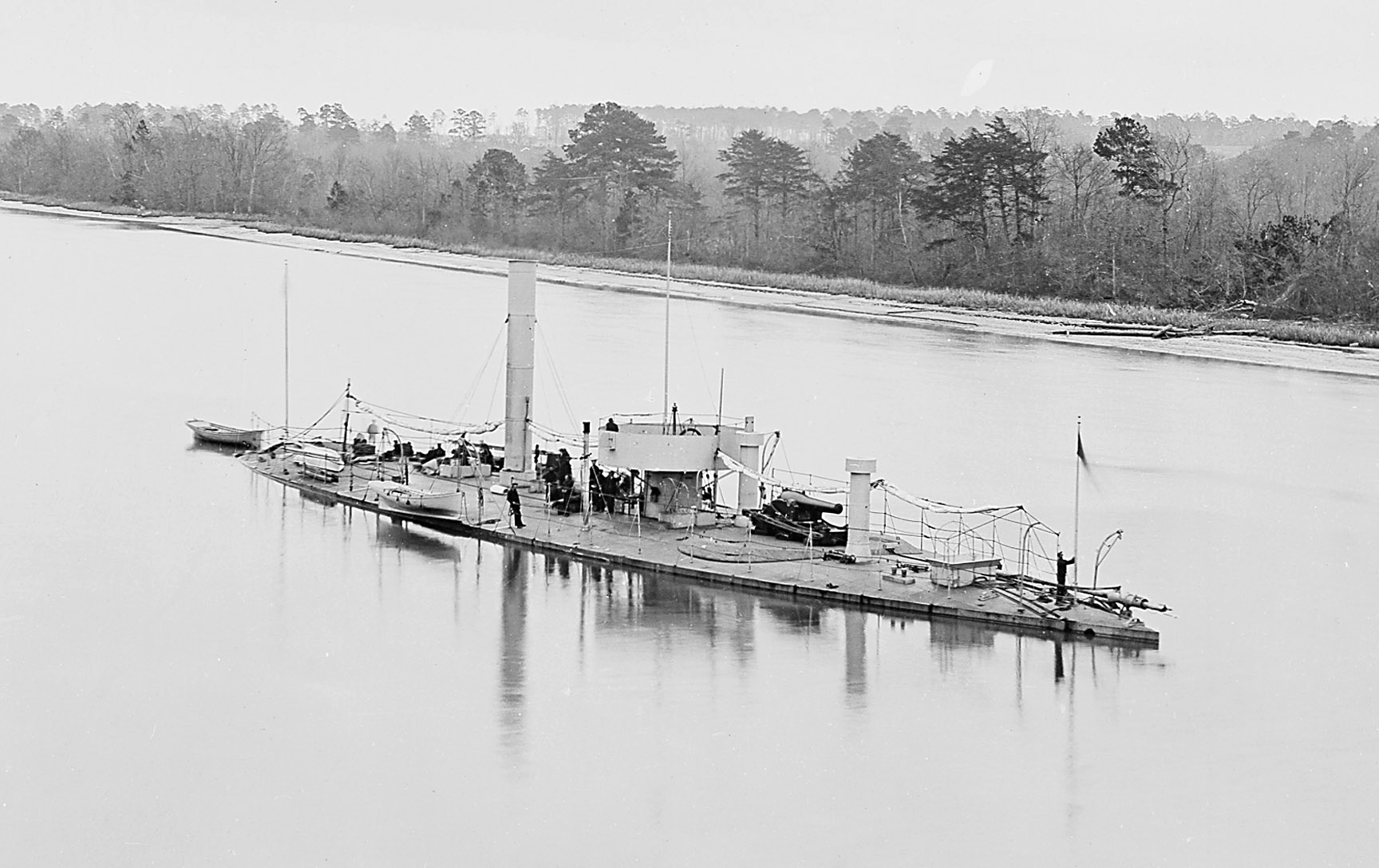
- USS Casco on the James River, Virginia, 1865, while serving as a spar torpedo vessel. Note the torpedo gear mounted on her bow and the 11-inch (279 mm) Dahlgren smoothbore gun pivot-mounted on deck.

History

United States
- Name: Casco
- Ordered: April 1863
- Builder: Atlantic Works, Boston
- Cost: $500,000
- Launched: May 1864
- Commissioned: 4 December 1864
- Decommissioned: 10 June 1865
- Renamed: Hero
- Refit: To spar torpedo vessel, June 1864
- Fate: Broken up, April 1875

General characteristics
- Class & type: Casco-class light draft monitor
- Displacement: 1,175
- Length: 225 ft (69 m)
- Beam: 45 ft (14 m)
- Draft: 9 ft (2.7 m)
- Propulsion: Steam engine, twin screws
- Speed: 9 knots (17 km/h)
- Complement: 69 officers and enlisted
- Armament: 1 × 11-inch (280 mm) Dahlgren smoothbore cannon, 1 x spar torpedo
- Armor: Turret 8-inch (200 mm); pilothouse 10-inch (250 mm); hull and deck 3-inch (76 mm)

The first USS Casco was the first of a class of twenty 1,175-ton light-draft monitors built by Atlantic Works, Boston, Massachusetts for the Union Navy during the American Civil War.

== Launch and refitting ==
Upon her launching in May 1864, it was found that the design of these ships was seriously flawed. She was pronounced unseaworthy when nearly completed and on 25 June 1864 she was ordered to be converted to a torpedo vessel, without a turret or heavy guns. Casco was commissioned 4 December 1864.

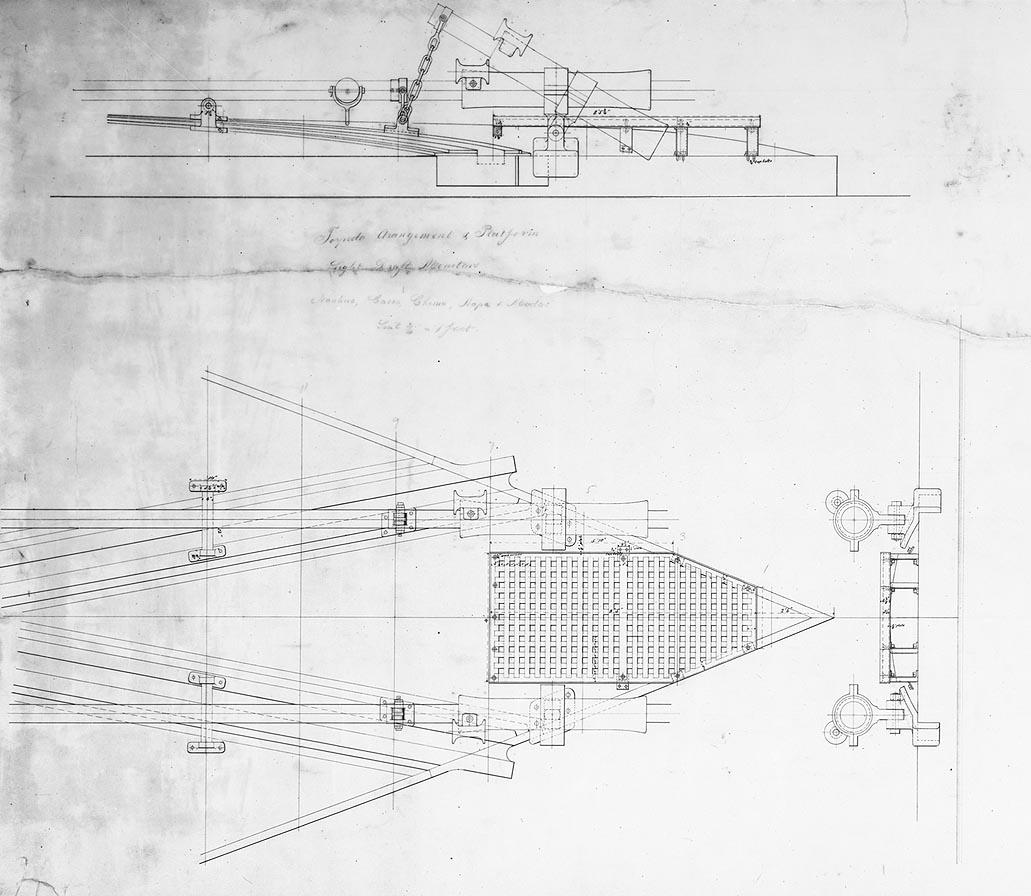
The plans for the torpedo mechanism on the modified Casco-class monitors

John Ericsson developed the original design for the Casco-class monitors, but Chief Engineer Alban C. Stimers, the General Inspector of Ironclads, elaborated it. When bids were requested for the ships, Assistant Secretary of the Navy Gustavus Fox wrote to Ericsson to confirm that Stimers had arranged the details with Ericsson's approval. Ericsson replied that he had been kept in the dark and that Stimers had "frittered away" Ericsson's principles, but in March 1863, Fox began to award contracts anyway. The vessels received another redesign in the aftermath of Rear Admiral Samuel F. Du Pont's failed attack on Charleston, South Carolina, on 7 April 1863. Twenty vessels were ordered without serious scrutiny of the design. $14 million US was allocated for the construction of these vessels. It was discovered that Stimers and his assistant Theodore Allen had failed to compensate properly for the weight his revisions added to the original plan and this resulted in excessive stress on the hull and a freeboard of only 3 inches (76 mm). In June 1864, Stimers was removed from control of the project and Ericsson was called in to undo the damage. He was forced to raise the hulls of the monitors under construction by nearly two feet and the first few completed vessels had their turrets removed and a single pivot-mount 11 in (280 mm) Dahlgren cannon mounted. These same few vessels had a retractable spar torpedo added as well.

== Potomac Flotilla ==
After completion of the additional yard work, Casco was towed to Hampton Roads in March 1865. She assisted in the removal of mines in the James River which made possible the advance of naval forces to Richmond, VA. In mid-April she was transferred to the Potomac Flotilla, with whom she served until the end of May. Casco was decommissioned 10 June 1865 at Washington Navy Yard. In the widespread ship-renamings that took place in June 1869, Casco was given the new name Hero. She saw no further active service, and she was broken up in April 1875.
