= Trunk deck ship =

Type of merchant ship hull shape

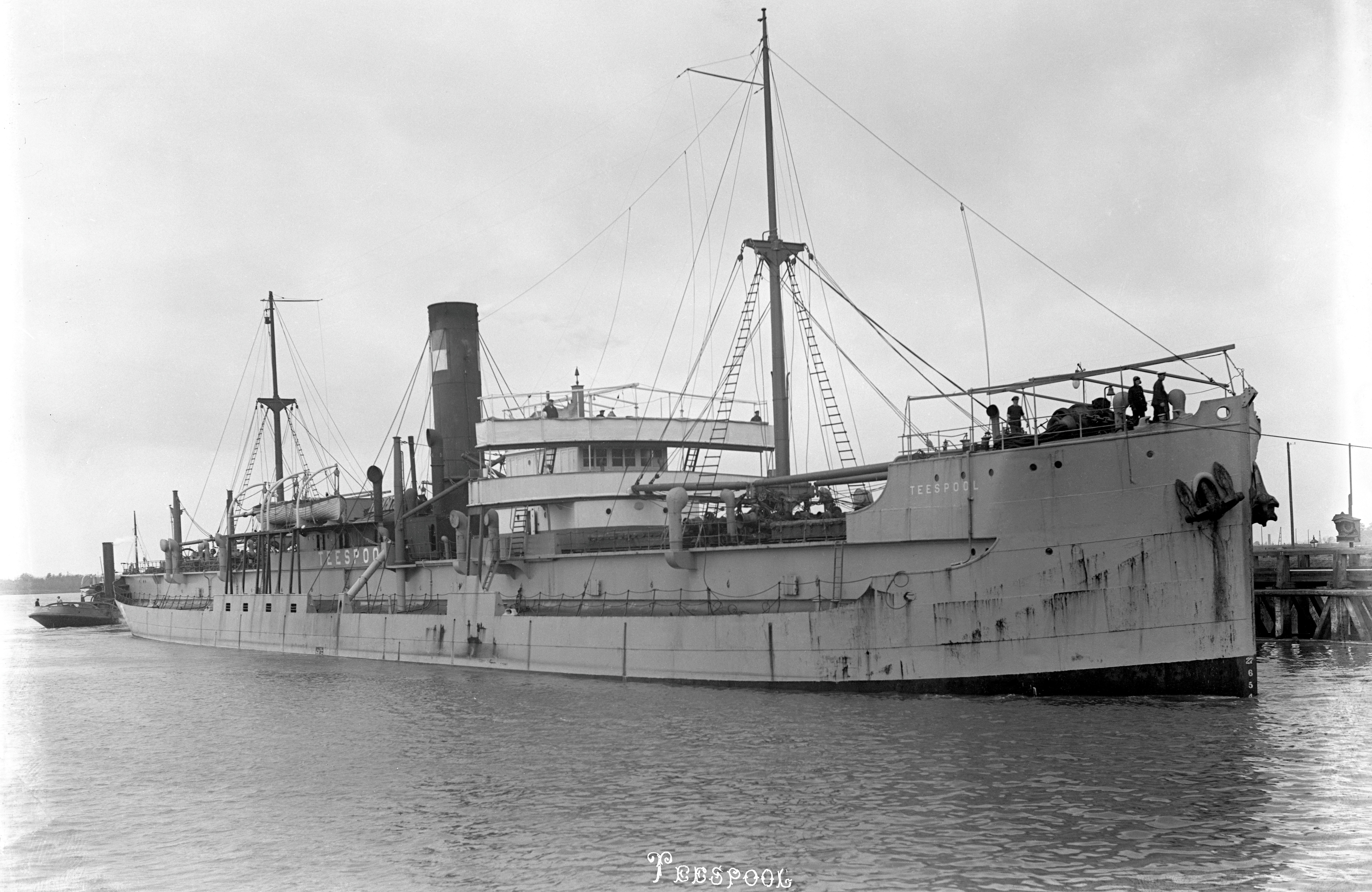
Teespool, a trunk deck ship built by Robert Ropner & Sons in 1905

A trunk deck ship is a type of merchant ship with a hull that was stepped inward in order to obtain more favourable treatment under canal toll rules then in effect. As those tolls were set by net tonnage, a measure of volume, and as the tonnage rules did not account for all of the cargo space of such vessels, trunk deck ships incurred lower tolls than more conventional ships of equivalent capacity. When the measurement rules were changed, this ship type was no longer built.

== Background and design ==
Trunk deck ships were influenced by; and allegedly copied from; turret deck ships. In 1892, the Sunderland, England firm of William Doxford and Sons Ltd. built its first turret deck ship. Inspired by US whalebacks, one of which had recently visited Liverpool, Doxford built a ship which had a curved hull form which was stepped in above the waterline. The narrow part of the hull, called a turret, was part of the hold.

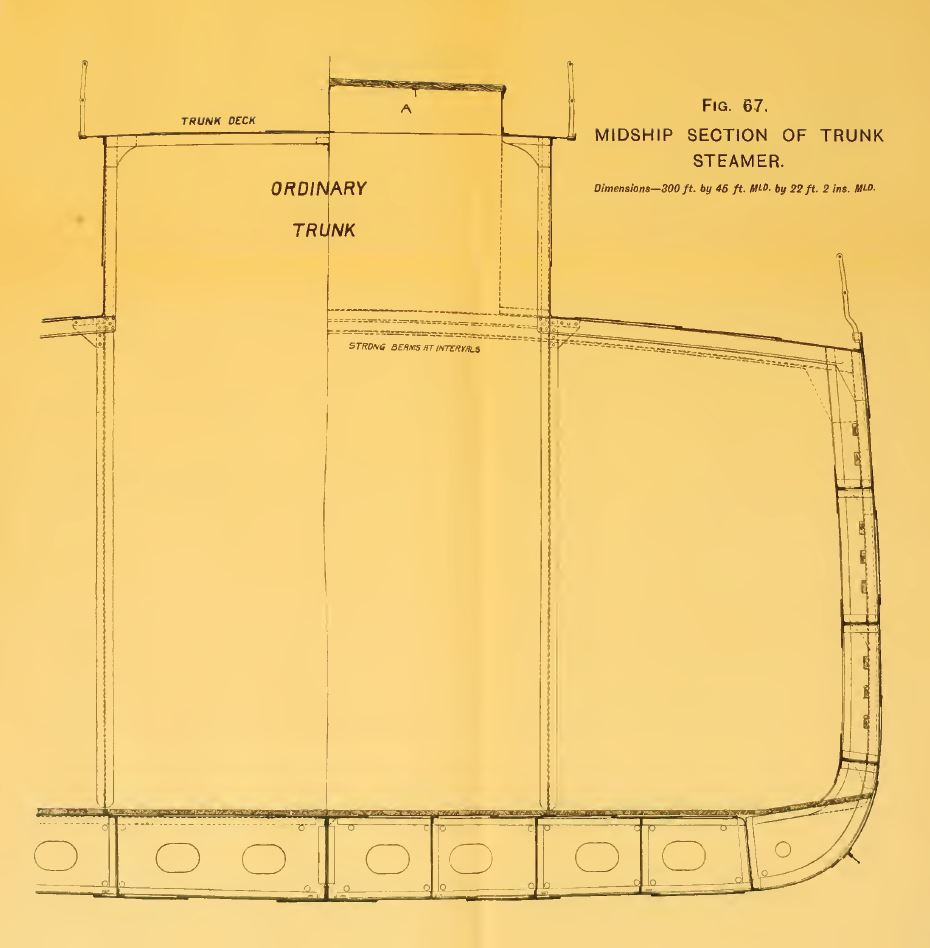
Cross-section of a trunk deck ship

Four years after the first turret deck ship, the first trunk deck ship was built. Trunkby, completed in 1896, was built by Sir Robert Ropner & Sons at his shipyard at Stockton-on-Tees. This vessel was of "three-island" construction with a forecastle, bridge house, and quarterdeck, extending to the full width of a low-freeboard hull. A distinctive feature was a long "trunk" along the centerline, with a breadth of about half the vessel's beam, which connected the three elements of the superstructure. This trunk was stepped inward from the sides of the hull. That trunk was not a deckhouse or superstructure, but was part of the hull, and contained cargo space.

In hull form, trunk ships resembled turret deck vessels, differing mainly in eliminating the curves and joining the above-water horizontal part of the hull with the vertical strakes and sides of the trunk by right angles. The similarity was such that Doxford, builder and operator of the turret decks, sued Ropners for patent infringement.

== Advantages and disadvantages ==
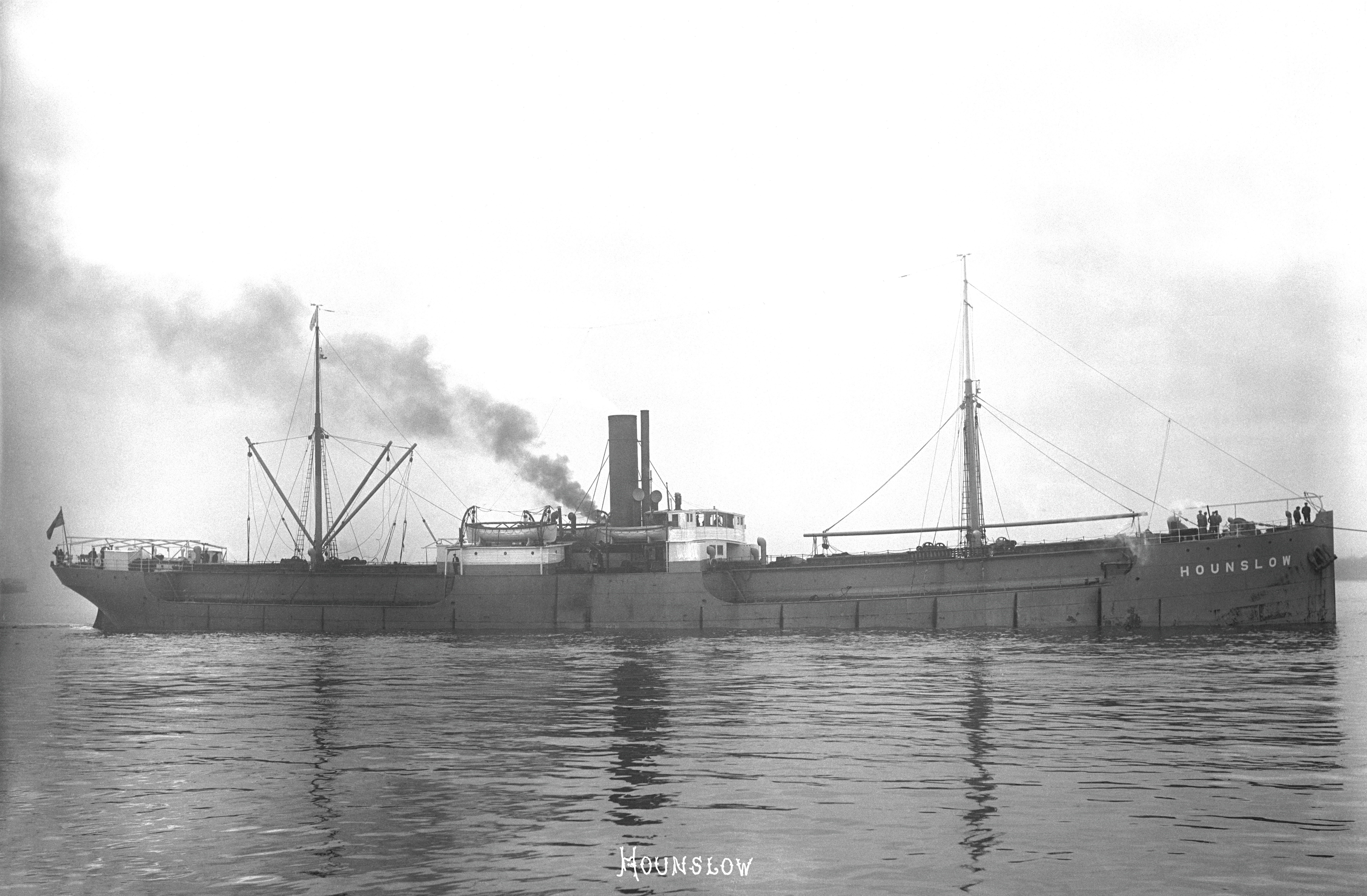
Hounslow; formerly Barton. A trunk deck ship built by Robert Ropner & Sons in 1899.

As with turret deck ships, the design of the trunk deck ships was said to maximize strength while reducing the amount of steel needed for construction. Disadvantages included the narrow hatches atop the trunk, which inhibited efficient loading and unloading. The low freeboard meant smaller waves could board the ship, and the bridge and superstructure therefore had to be stronger to resist wave action.

Trunk deck ships had a low net tonnage (an approximate measure of cargo space) in comparison to their deadweight tonnage capacity (weight of cargo). Net tonnage is a computation of volume, and the method of measurement used at the Suez Canal to determine tolls was based on a measure of net tonnage which excluded the cargo spaces in the trunks of these unconventional hulls. Trunk deck ships therefore paid less in tolls. In 1911 the toll measure at Suez was changed, and construction of the trunk deck ships ceased.

== Sources ==
- Craig, Robin (1980). The Ship – Steam Tramps and Cargo Liners 1850–1950. Vol. 5. London: National Maritime Museum/W.S.Cowell Ltd. for Her Majesty's Stationery Office. ISBN 0-11-290315-0.
- Duerkop, John (July 2007). "Some Marine Terminology". Research Resources. Marine Museum of the Great Lakes at Kingston. Archived from the original on 6 July 2011.
- Macdonald, Mike (2000). "Tyne to Tees shipping and shipbuilding "Reading List" (M-Z)". Transport History Pages.
- "Ropners, Owning and Building Ships". Shipping Lines. PortCities Southampton. Archived from the original on 25 March 2004.
- "Ropner and Son". Grace's Guide: The Best of British Engineering 1750s–1960s.
- Walton, Thomas (1908). Steel Ships: Their Construction and Maintenance (4th ed.). London: Charles Griffin & Co. pp. 161–65.. Google books has images of those pages, which contain the chapter called Trunk Steamers. Retrieved 26 March 2008.
- Woodman, Richard (2002) [1997]. The History of the Ship. London: Lyons Press (Globe Pequot Press)/Conway Maritime Press. ISBN 1-58574-621-5.

== Photographs ==
- Bow three-quarter and Stern three-quarter photographs of Trunkby in the River Avon, Bristol, from Old Ship Picture Galleries of www.photoship.co.uk.
