= Blötberget =

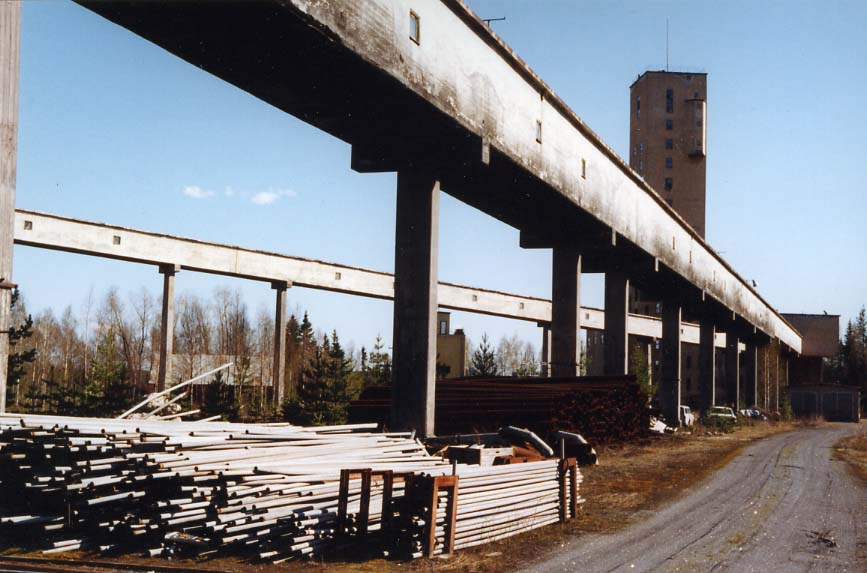
- The mine in Blötberget in 1998

- Location within Dalarna Location within Sweden
- Coordinates: 60°07′N 15°04′E
- Country: Sweden
- Province: Dalarna
- County: Dalarna County
- Municipality: Ludvika Municipality

Area
  - Total: 1.32 km^{2} (0.51 sq mi)

Population (31 December 2010)
  - Total: 428
  - Density: 325/km^{2} (840/sq mi)
- Time zone: UTC+1 (CET)
  - Summer (DST): UTC+2 (CEST)
- Climate: Dfb

Blötberget is a locality situated in Ludvika Municipality, Dalarna County, Sweden with 428 inhabitants in 2010.

Blötberget is part of the Ludvika Mines, and lies in the Bergslagen mineral district of central Sweden. Bergslagen is known for the significant content of high-quality iron-oxide occurrences and historically has contributed to the Swedish economy and well-being for over 800 years.

Numerous seismic surveys have been conducted in the area for deep-targeting the primary deposits and understanding their host-rock structures.
