= Turret deck ship =

Type of merchant ship hull shape

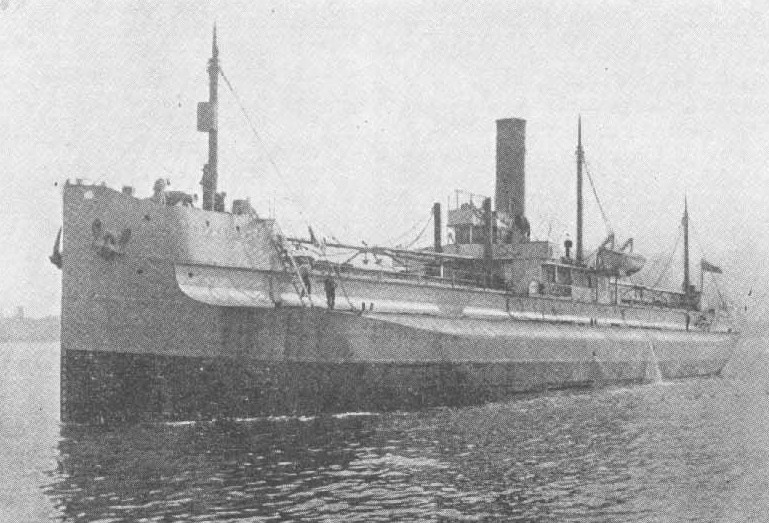
Turret Chief running light; stepped hull form and raised midline "turret" are shown.

A turret deck ship is a type of merchant ship with an unusual hull, designed and built in the late 19th and early 20th centuries. The hulls of turret deck vessels were rounded and stepped inward above their waterlines. This gave some advantages in strength and allowed them to pay lower canal tolls under tonnage measurement rules then in effect. The type ceased to be built after those rules changed. The last turret deck ship in existence was scrapped in 1960.

== Development ==
Turret deck ships were inspired by the visit of the US whaleback vessel Charles W. Wetmore to Liverpool in 1891. Like others of the type, Wetmore had a hull in the form of a flattened cigar, with a continuous curve above the waterline to where the sides met amidships. The superstructure atop the hull was in round or oval "turrets", so named because of their resemblance to gunhouses on contemporary warships.

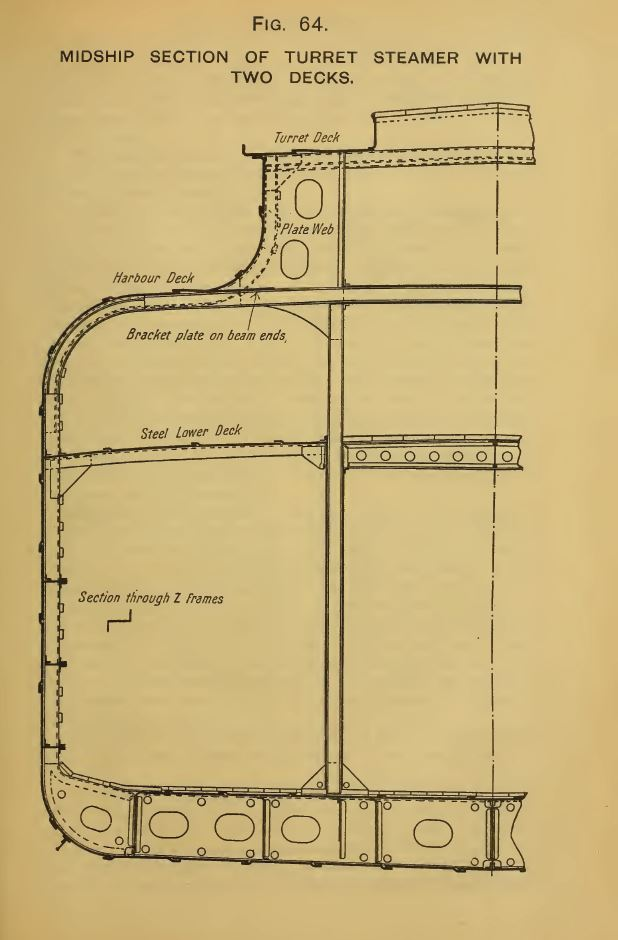
Cross-section of a turret deck ship

In 1893 William Doxford and Sons Ltd. ("Doxford") of Sunderland, England, built one whaleback under license from the type's designer, but had already built its first turret deck ship to a design by Arthur Havers, the concern's chief draughtsman. Havers toned down the more radical features of the whaleback. His design retained conventional bows and sterns instead of the upswept conoid "snout" of the whaleback. Instead of a rounded hull, the hull of a turret ship was stepped inward above the waterline, but the horizontal and vertical surfaces of the hull met in curves rather than by right angles as in conventional ships. Finally, the design joined the rounded turrets of whalebacks into one long and narrow rectangular structure (also called a "turret") of about half the beam, and used that space as part of the hold.

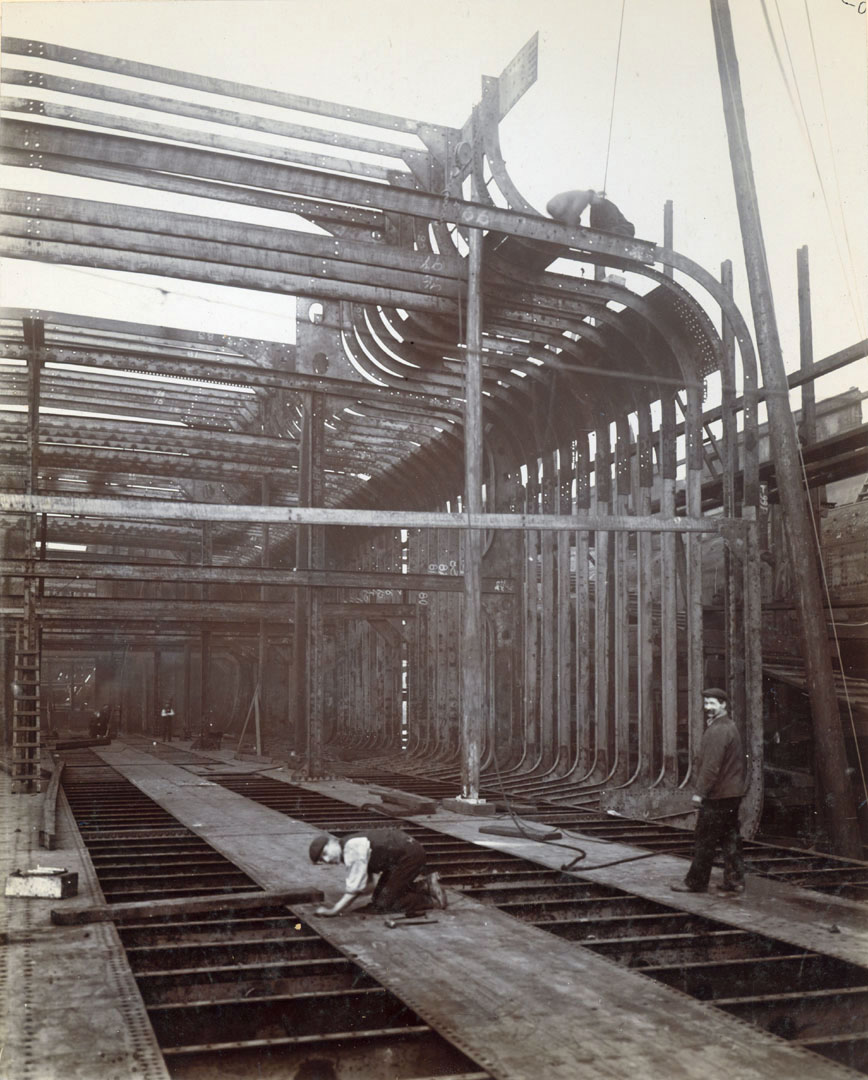
Assembling frames of Grängesberg in Pallion in 1903

The design was patented. Doxford's first ship, Turret, was notable for her abnormally long and wide hatches in the turret, and self-trimming due to the rounded shape in the upper hold and lower turret. She was thus ideal for grain. Turret was designed for tonnage of 4,700 DWT at a load line draft of 20 feet 3 inches (6.2 m) at 2,850 GRT. With engines aft the design was seen as ideal for the bulk oil trade meeting the latest Suez Canal regulations in which coal bunkers would be separated from oil cargo by a double bulkhead filled with water. The ship had an unusually high righting angle which was obtained whether full or lightly loaded. In particular the design was seen as a solution to the problem of strength and economical cost. On well deck ships the lack of a continuous line of the deck, one the turret ship design solved with a continuous line and solid structure up to the top of the turret, resulted in weakness with classification societies taking notice by requiring increased strengthening in construction. The long, wide hatches were seen as making the design especially suitable for carrying heavy or bulky machinery. That feature later resulted in cargoes such as 75 feet (22.9 m) long, 8 feet (2.4 m) wide girders and a 110-ton gun being easily loaded.

By March 1895 the design had considerable acceptance. Nine ships were in use: Turret, Turret Age, Turret Bay, Bencliff, Turret Bell, Progressist, Royalist, Hopedale and Forest Abbey; and five more were being built.

== Description and design ==
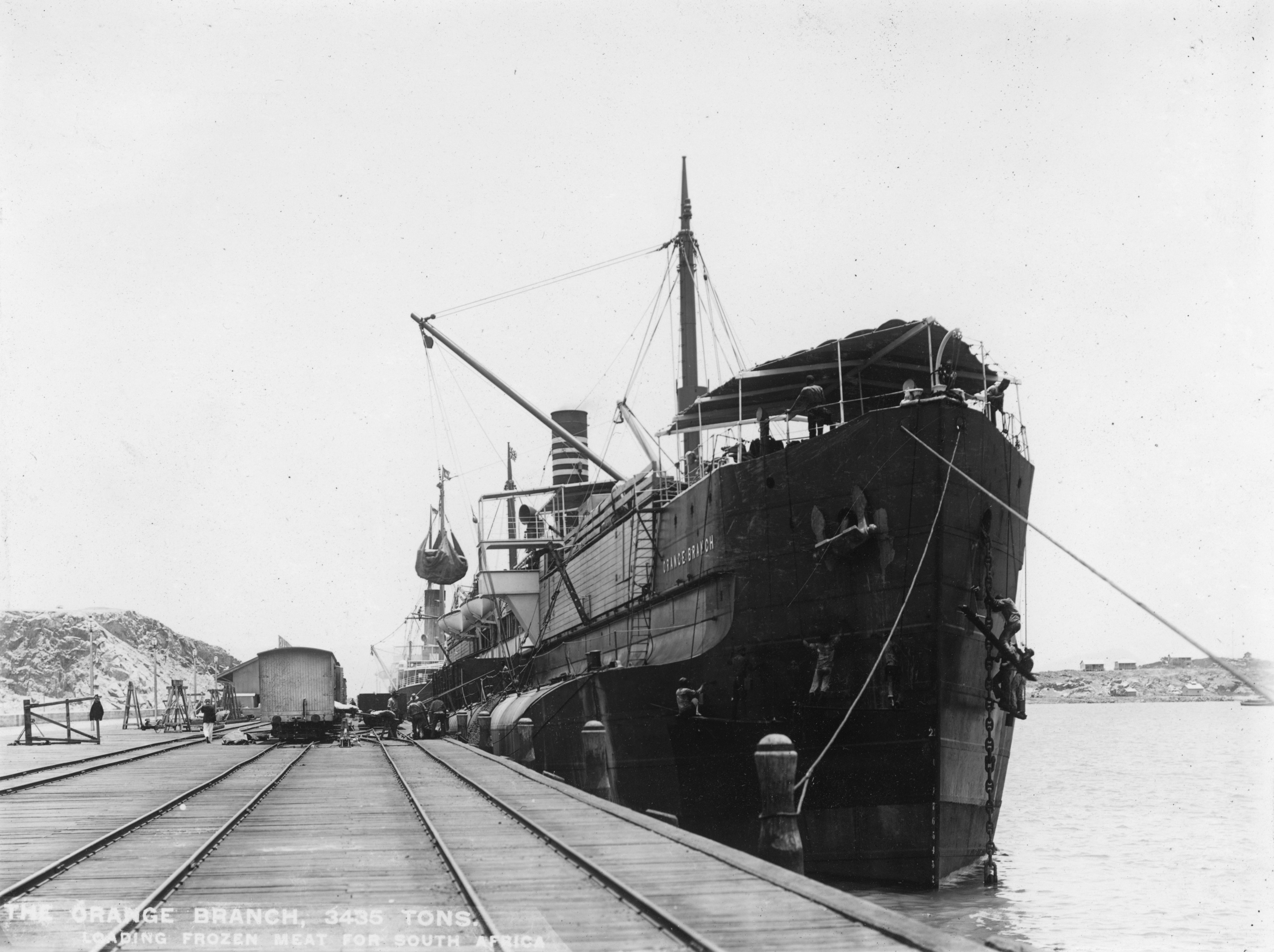
The turret deck ship Orange Branch in Townsville, Queensland about 1901. This view, almost bow-on, shows her hull's distinctive profile.

In side profile, turret deck ships resembled other merchant ships with flush decks or with small forecastles and poop decks. In cross-section the differences between turret deck ships and more conventional ships are apparent. There was no gunwale; the vertical side of a turret ship curves inward above the load line to a horizontal plane. This flat area was known as the harbour deck. Further inboard, this "deck" arced to the vertical again by a reverse curve. That vertical plane then joined the weather deck atop the turret at a right angle. Structurally these elements were part of the hull, not of the superstructure, and the cargo holds of the ship extended up to the true weather deck atop the turret.

This design, and that of its near relative the trunk deck ship, were said to maximize strength, allowing larger ships and reduced the amount of steel needed for construction. In reality, it is more likely that the geometry inhibited the development of cracks in the sheer strake but ships to this design were not any lighter than conventional ships due to their unique geometry. In operation their hull form promoted self-trimming of homogenous cargo and inhibited shifting.

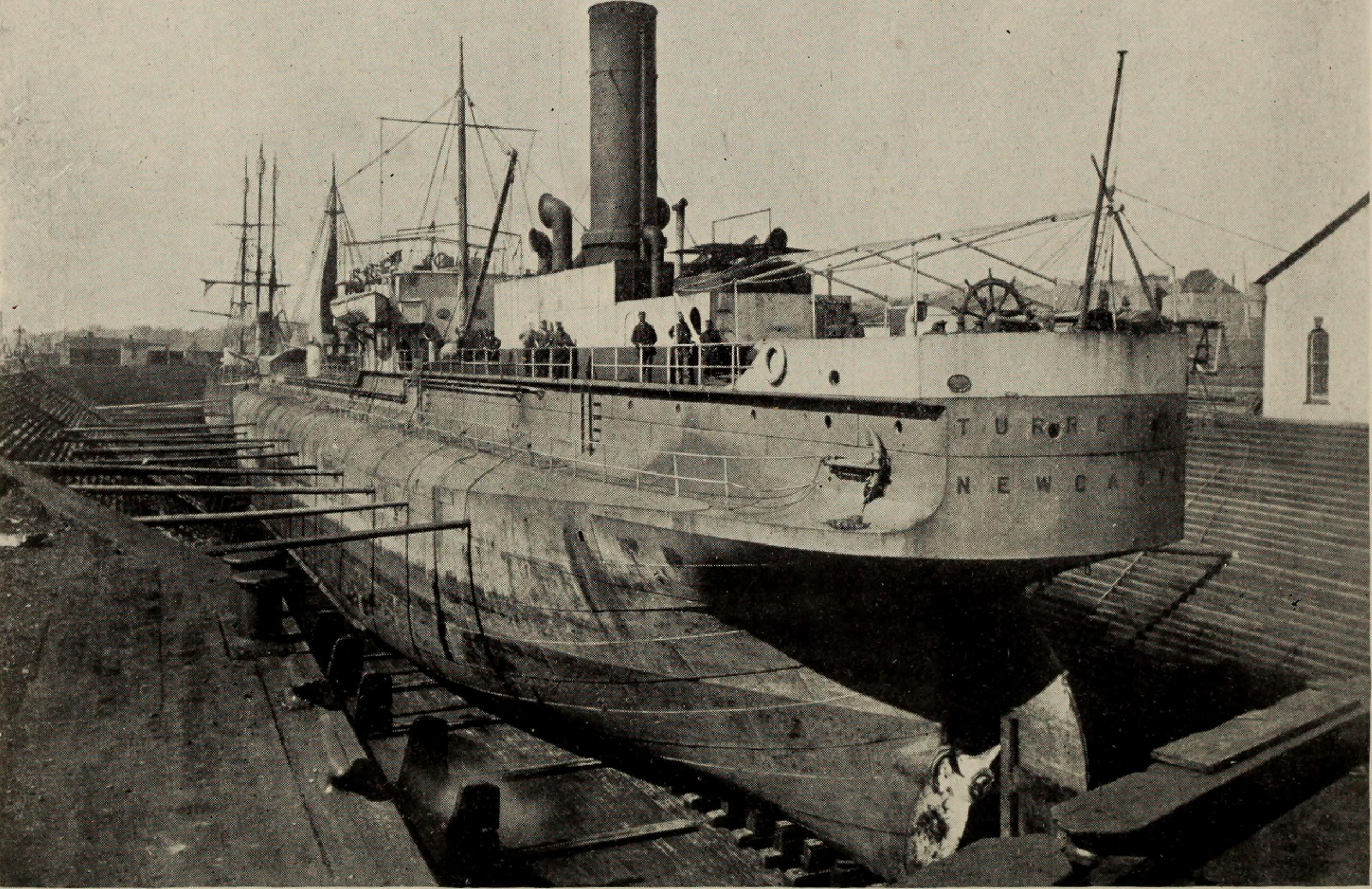
Turret Age in dry dock at St. John's, Newfoundland in 1899

The design also called for a cellular double bottom, which was the probable reason for claims of the type's exceptional hull strength, but it also raised the centre of gravity of the cargo. A higher centre of gravity increased the roll period and reduced the violence of rolls. But loading heavy cargo too high, and failing to properly ballast the bottom tanks, raised the centre of gravity and led to instability. This led to accidents, a Board of Trade investigation, and cautions from Doxford on proper loading. The design was also inconvenient, as the narrowness of the turret made for smaller cargo hatches and restricted habitation spaces in the superstructure atop the turret.

Turret deck ships had a low net tonnage (an approximate measure of cargo space) in comparison to their deadweight capacity (weight of cargo), allowing them to operate at a lower fee structure than a conventional hull. Net tonnage is a computation of volume, and the method of measurement used at the Suez Canal to determine tolls was based on a measure of net tonnage which excluded some of the cargo spaces of these unconventional hulls. Turret and trunk deck ships therefore paid less in tolls than conventional ships of the same capacity.

In 1911, the toll measure changed at Suez to account for all cargo spaces, and contemporaneous refinements in the design of ships of more conventional hull form eliminated the structural advantages of turret deck ships. Construction of the type therefore ceased.

== History of use ==
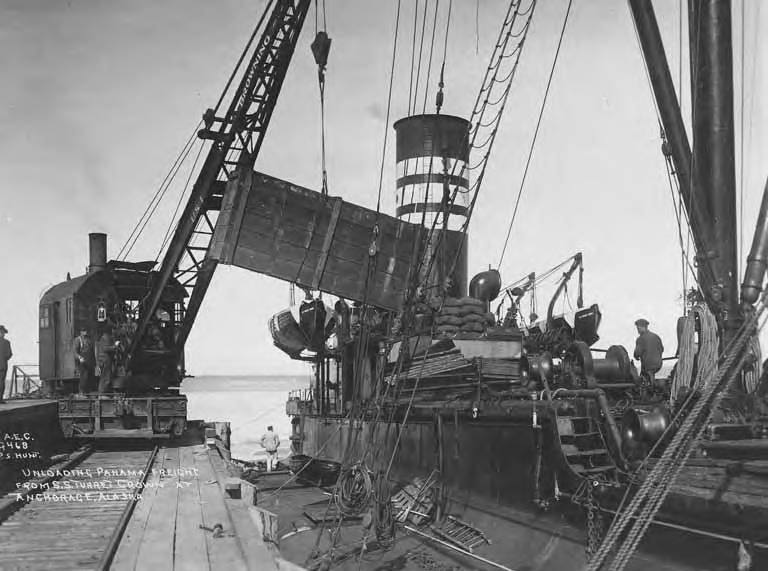
Unloading Turret Crown in Anchorage, Alaska in about 1917

Over 180 ships of the type had been built before the design was abandoned, 176 of them by William Doxford and Sons. They were used in both line voyage and tramp service until retired, wrecked, or lost in the First or Second World War. The British Clan Line, which traded globally in cargos such as foodstuffs, timber, metals, manufactured goods, case oil, jute, tea, nitrates, and general cargo, used 32 of the type.

While used for general freight, these ships were particularly suited to the carriage of bulk cargos such as grains, coal, and ores. Several were sold to Canadian interests for use in the latter trades on the Saint Lawrence River and Great Lakes of North America. The last of them, Turret Cape, operated until mid-century and was not scrapped until 1959. Only the former Nonsuch was in operation a little longer. The ship was kept in business as Hermann Fritzen until 1959 by owner Johs. Fritzen & Sohn of Emden. Finally sold for demolition in April 1959, Hermann Fritzen arrived for breaking at Eckhardt & Co. in Hamburg in the first quarter of 1960.

== See also ==
- SS Clan Ranald
- USS Beukelsdijk

== Photographs ==
- Colour photographs of model of SS Nonsuch, a highly detailed full-hull builder's model in the collections of the National Maritime Museum. Nonsuch was built by Doxford in 1906 for Bowles Brothers and lost to air attack in 1944. "Description, Turret deck cargo ship 'Nonsuch'". Collections Online, ship models. National Maritime Museum. Archived from the original on January 27, 2006.
- SS Claverly Wreck Report, showing a stern view of SS Claverley showing narrow harbour decks a short distance above the water. Claverley, 3,829 gross register tons (GRT), was built by Doxford in 1907, owned by Sutherland Steamship Company, and torpedoed by a German U-boat near the Eddystone in 1917. "SS Claverly". Wreck Reports. SouthWestMafia.com. 2007. Archived from the original on 1 October 2011. That source also reproduces pages 70–71 of Hardy (1924), with figure 28 showing a midships cross-section of a turret vessel.
- Historical Collections of the Great Lakes maintained by Bowling Green State University has some photographs of turret ships. The photograph of Turret Chief shows a heavily laden vessel with harbour decks nearly awash.
