= List of shipwrecks in September 1923 =

The list of shipwrecks in September 1923 includes ships sunk, foundered, grounded, or otherwise lost during September 1923.

== 1 September ==
List of shipwrecks: 1 September 1923
Ship	State	Description
Amagi	Imperial Japanese Navy	Great Kantō earthquake: The Amagi-class battlecruiser was damaged beyond economic repair at Yokosuka whilst under conversion to an aircraft carrier. She was scrapped in situ in 1924.
Unknown lighter	Japan	Great Kantō earthquake: The lighter, loaded with lumber, was shattered when caught between Lyons Maru (Japan), that had broken adrift from her dock, and Empress of Australia (United Kingdom).

== 2 September ==
List of shipwrecks: 2 September 1923
Ship	State	Description
City of Rockland	United States	The retired 274-foot (84 m), 1,696-gross register ton passenger ship, a sidewheel paddle steamer, was scuttled in very shallow water and burned as a means of disposal off Beverly, Massachusetts, between Great Misery Island and Little Misery Island at 42°32′44″N 070°48′08″W.

== 4 September ==
List of shipwrecks: 4 September 1923
Ship	State	Description
Cronstadt	United Kingdom	The tanker was destroyed by fire at Lisbon, Portugal.

== 5 September ==
List of shipwrecks: 5 September 1923
Ship	State	Description
USS New Jersey	United States Navy	The decommissioned Virginia-class battleship was sunk as target in the Atlantic Ocean off Diamond Shoals, North Carolina, by Martin NBS-1 bomber aircraft of the 2nd Bombardment Group ( United States Army Air Service).
USS Virginia	United States Navy	USS Virginia sinking. The decommissioned Virginia-class battleship was sunk as target in the Atlantic Ocean off Diamond Shoals, North Carolina, by Martin NBS-1 bomber aircraft of the 2nd Bombardment Group ( United States Army Air Service).

== 6 September ==
List of shipwrecks: 6 September 1923
Ship	State	Description
Orkney	United Kingdom	The dredger foundered in the Atlantic Ocean off the Longships Lighthouse.
Sanno Maru	Japan	The cargo ship ran aground on Kinzan Island, Rikuzen Province. She had broken in two by 17 September and was a total loss

== 8 September ==
List of shipwrecks: 8 September 1923
Ship	State	Description
Armour	United Kingdom	The cargo ship was gutted by fire and sank at Cleveland, Ohio, United States.
Chauncey	United States Navy	Wrecked ships at Honda Point Honda Point Disaster: The Clemson-class destroyer was wrecked at Honda Point, California. All 130 crew survived.
Cuba	United States	The cargo ship ran aground off San Miguel Island, California and was wrecked. Her crew were rescued.
Delphy	United States Navy	Honda Point Disaster: The Clemson-class destroyer was wrecked at Honda Point with the loss of three of her 130 crew.
Farragut	United States Navy	Honda Point Disaster: The Clemson-class destroyer ran aground at Honda Point. She was later refloated, repaired and returned to service.
Fuller	United States Navy	Honda Point Disaster: The Clemson-class destroyer was wrecked at Honda Point. All 122 crew survived.
Nicholas	United States Navy	Honda Point Disaster: The Clemson-class destroyer was wrecked at Honda Point. All 122 crew survived.
Somers	United States Navy	Honda Point Disaster: The Clemson-class destroyer grazed a rock at Honda Point and suffered slight damage.
S. P. Lee	United States Navy	Honda Point Disaster: The Clemson-class destroyer was wrecked at Honda Point.
Woodbury	United States Navy	Honda Point Disaster: The Clemson-class destroyer was wrecked at Honda Point. All 122 crew survived.
Young	United States Navy	Honda Point Disaster: The Clemson-class destroyer was wrecked at Honda Point with the loss of twenty of her 122 crew.

== 10 September ==
List of shipwrecks: 10 September 1923
Ship	State	Description
Ono Maru No.12	Japan	The cargo ship ran aground at Torusaki, Aomori. She sank in a typhoon on 16 September.

== 12 September ==
List of shipwrecks: 12 September 1923
Ship	State	Description
Despina	Greece	The cargo ship collided with Saxicava (United Kingdom) in the Strait of Gibraltar. She was taken in tow by Eemdijk (Netherlands) but sank 8 nautical miles (15 km) south south west of Gibraltar.
Fiume	Italy	The cargo ship struck a submerged wreck and sank in the Mediterranean Sea off the Planier Lighthouse, Bouches-du-Rhône, France.

== 15 September ==
List of shipwrecks: 15 September 1923
Ship	State	Description
Antonios	Greece	The cargo ship exploded and sank in the English Channel in the Atlantic Ocean (49°36′N 6°08′W). Her crew were rescued by Andrea Costa (flag unknown).

== 17 September ==
List of shipwrecks: 17 September 1923
Ship	State	Description
Pine Villa	United Kingdom	The coaster caught fire in the Irish Sea off South Stack, Anglesey and sank with the loss of four of her seven crew.

== 18 September ==
List of shipwrecks: 18 September 1923
Ship	State	Description
Paulette	France	The schooner foundered in the Atlantic Ocean (48°05′N 23°15′W).

== 21 September ==
List of shipwrecks: 21 September 1923
Ship	State	Description
Urrugne	France	The cargo ship was discovered abandoned in the English Channel off the Royal Sovereign Lightship (United Kingdom). She was towed into Dover, Kent by Lady Brassey (United Kingdom). Her crew were later rescued by Tallo (Netherlands) and landed at IJmuiden, Netherlands.

== 24 September ==
List of shipwrecks: 21 September 1923
Ship	State	Description
Waubic	Canada	The steamboat ran aground in rocks in fog on Lake Ontario at Bear Point on the coast of New York about 8 nautical miles (15 km; 9.2 mi) from Cape Vincent, New York, while making her daily run between Cape Vincent and Kingston, Ontario, Canada. The motor launch USFS Curlew ( United States Bureau of Fisheries) took off 58 of her passengers, and her other 17 passengers were landed via other means. Waubic was refloated after a few hours and returned to service.

== 25 September ==
List of shipwrecks: 25 September 1923
Ship	State	Description
Obernai	United Kingdom	The cargo ship sprang a leak at Sydney, Nova Scotia, Canada and was beached.

== 27 September ==
List of shipwrecks: 27 September 1923
Ship	State	Description
Fred J. Wood	United States	During a gale, the 681-gross register ton, 181-foot (55.2 m) schooner washed ashore in Port Clarence Bay on the coast of the Territory of Alaska and was pounded to pieces by the surf. All 105 people aboard survived and were rescued by the steamer Buford (United States).
Santa Maria	Portugal	The cargo ship came ashore at Cape Villano, Spain.

== 28 September ==
List of shipwrecks: 28 September 1923
Ship	State	Description
Alcibiades	Belgium	The cargo ship sprang a leak and was beached at Varna, Romania.
Reliance	United States	The inland passenger vessel was destroyed by fire in Louisiana after an explosion in her engine room. Six killed.
Taku No. 5	United States	With no one and no cargo aboard, the 19-ton scow was blown ashore during a gale and wrecked in Taku Harbor in Taku Inlet in Southeast Alaska. The wreck was hauled ashore and burned to prevent it from causing further damage in the harbor.

== 29 September ==
List of shipwrecks: 29 September 1923
Ship	State	Description
Brotonne	France	The cargo ship was in collision with another vessel in Falmouth Bay and sank. All seventeen crew survived.
Florence	United Kingdom	The schooner was in collision with Mokta (United Kingdom) in the English Channel between the South Goodwin and West Goodwin Lightships (both United Kingdom) with the loss of twelve or thirteen lives. The sole survivor was rescued by Zora (Yugoslavia).
La Guardia	Spain	The cargo ship sank at Tarragona, Catalonia.
Rubaiyat	United States	The motor vessel capsized 10 minutes after leaving dock at Tacoma, Washington due to cargo shift. Four crew killed.

== 30 September ==
List of shipwrecks: 30 September 1923
Ship	State	Description
Clan Macmaster	United Kingdom	The cargo ship ran aground on the Calf of Man, Isle of Man. She was declared a total loss on 3 October.
Gutfeld	Germany	The cargo ship ran aground on the Longships, off Cornwall, United Kingdom. She was refloated but was discovered to be leaking severely and was beached in Falmouth Bay.
