= USS Woodbury (DD-309) =

Clemson-class destroyer

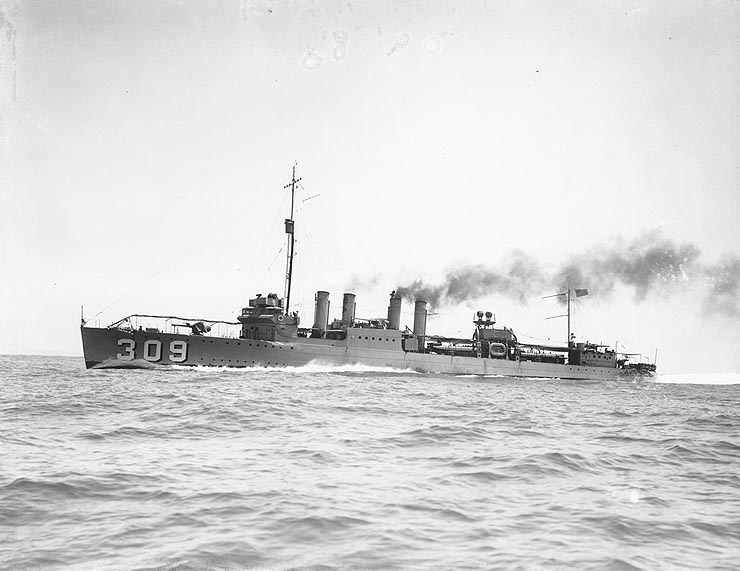
- USS Woodbury (DD-309)

History

United States
- Namesake: Levi Woodbury
- Builder: Bethlehem Shipbuilding Corporation, Union Iron Works, San Francisco
- Laid down: 3 October 1918
- Launched: 6 February 1919
- Commissioned: 20 October 1920
- Decommissioned: 26 October 1923
- Stricken: 20 November 1923
- Fate: Wrecked in Honda Point Disaster 8 September 1923

General characteristics
- Class & type: Clemson-class destroyer
- Displacement: 1,308 tons
- Length: 314 feet 4 1/2 inches (95.82 m)
- Beam: 30 feet 11 1/2 inches (9.44 m)
- Draft: 9 feet 4 inches (2.84 m)
- Propulsion: 26,500 shp (20 MW); geared turbines, twin propellers
- Speed: 35 kn (65 km/h)
- Range: 4,900 nmi (9,100 km); @ 15-knot (28 km/h)
- Complement: 122 officers and enlisted
- Armament: 4 × 4 in (102 mm)/50 guns, 1 × 3 in (76 mm)/25 gun, 12 × 21 inch (533 mm) torpedo tubes, 2 depth charge tracks

The third USS Woodbury (DD-309) was a Clemson-class destroyer in the United States Navy. She was named for Levi Woodbury.

== History ==
Woodbury was laid down on 3 October 1918 at San Francisco, California, by the Union Iron Works plant of the Bethlehem Shipbuilding Corporation; launched on 6 February 1919; sponsored by Miss Catherine Muhlenberg Chapin, the daughter of newspaper publisher W. W. Chapin; reclassified DD-309 on 17 July 1920; and commissioned at Mare Island Navy Yard, Vallejo, California, on 20 October 1920.

Woodbury departed San Francisco on 22 November and reached San Diego, her assigned home port, the following day. Woodbury moored at the Reserve Docks, where she remained into 1921. The destroyer, like many of her numerous sisters begun during World War I, had entered service at a time when the post-war cutbacks in funds and personnel had seriously curtailed American peacetime naval operations. Accordingly, she was placed in a "rotating reserve" established by the Navy to maintain a "force in readiness." In operation, the system required that one-third of a given force remain pierside, maintained by only the minimum number of officers and men, while another third was to be half-manned as it remained berthed at a buoy in the harbor. The last third was fully manned and remained at buoys in the harbor but for periodic operations underway at sea.

Woodbury departed her mooring at the Reserve Docks on 1 February 1921 and, over the next few days, conducted torpedo practices and made a 30-knot (56 km/h) speed run off the southern California coast. During that brief underway period, the destroyer conducted her operations during the day and returned to her mooring buoy in the evenings. She remained largely port-bound from March to May, but moved to San Pedro, California, on 14 June. There, her crew assisted in preservation and maintenance work on William Jones (DD-308) while she lay in drydock at the Los Angeles Shipbuilding and Dry Dock Company, San Pedro. Woodbury then underwent a drydocking herself for the application of anti-corrosive and antifouling paint to her bottom. Woodbury later returned to San Diego and, but for a run, via Los Angeles harbor, to Seattle, Washington, stayed there for the remainder of 1921.

Underway on the morning of 14 January 1922, Woodbury led Nicholas (DD-311), S. P. Lee (DD-310), and Young (DD-312) to sea. She arrived off Goat Island, near San Francisco, at 0820 the following day and lay to, embarking passengers for transportation to Navy Yard Puget SoundPuget Sound Navy Yard, Bremerton, Washington, before she resumed her cruise up the Pacific coast. The destroyer reached Puget Sound on the afternoon of the 18th, discharged her passengers, and soon commenced her scheduled overhaul.

Woodbury remained at Puget Sound through March 1922. She got underway for San Diego on 3 April but put into Port Angeles, Washington, when Nicholas developed a machinery casualty. Upon completion of Nicholas' repairs, Woodbury resumed her passage southward and reached San Diego on 8 April.

The destroyer lay at berth 35, San Diego harbor, into the summer, again as part of the inactive arm of the "rotating reserve." From early July to late September, Woodbury provided essential maintenance and upkeep services to her sister ships in the decommissioned Destroyer Division 17 moored alongside. There were only two breaks in the ship's routine during that time: a tender upkeep period alongside Melville (AD-2) and her participation in the funeral of the late Rear Admiral Uriel Sebree, on 8 August, for which she sent a party ashore to form part of the naval escort for the casket.

Woodbury got underway on 26 September 1922 and conducted gunnery exercises in company with Young and Nicholas. After another period of upkeep alongside Melville, the destroyer participated in an intensive slate of gunnery and torpedo drills. Then, late in October, she also performed torpedo recovery chores for the battleships Idaho (BB-42) and New Mexico (BB-40).

After spending the remainder of 1922 in San Diego waters, Woodbury stood out of San Diego harbor on 6 February 1923, in company with Destroyer Squadrons 11 and 12 and the tender Melville, all ships bound for Mexico, and, ultimately, for Panama. Arriving at Magdalena Bay on the 8th, Woodbury refueled from Kanawha (AO-1) before she pushed on for Panamanian waters on the 11th. That afternoon, she rendezvoused with the dreadnoughts of Battleship Divisions 3, 4, and 5 and conducted exercises with them en route to Panama.

Over the ensuing weeks, Woodbury took part in the first of the Navy's large scale fleet maneuvers, Fleet Problem I. Held in the vicinity of the strategic Panama Canal Zone, Fleet Problem I was designed to ascertain the defensive condition of that waterway, to allow for the formulation of the "estimate of the situation," and to facilitate the study of war plans. Woodbury took part in the exercises as part of the "attacking" forces built around the Battle Fleet. The opposing forces consisted of the Scouting Fleet, augmented by a division of battleships.

During one phase of the operation, while the ships lay anchored at Panama Bay, Henderson (AP-1) — bearing the Secretary of the Navy, Edwin C. Denby, and the Chief of Naval Operations, Admiral Robert E. Coontz - stood through the fleet. Later, Woodbury resumed her operations with the Battle Fleet — conducting gunnery drills, antisubmarine screening, protective screening for the battleships — and serving as a target for Battleship Division 4 during its long-range battle practices.

Returning to San Diego on 11 April, Woodbury remained there into the summer. Departing her home port on 25 June, however, she sailed for the Pacific Northwest and reached Tacoma, Washington, via San Francisco, on 2 July. There, her landing force participated in the Independence Day parade at Tacoma.

Woodbury departed Tacoma on 9 July and reached Port Angeles the same day. For nearly two weeks, the destroyer operated out of that port, conducting exercises, tactical maneuvers, and short range battle practices. After that stint of operations, she shifted to Bellingham, Wash., and, later, to Seattle.

Underway at 0405 on 27 July, Woodbury departed the fleet's anchorage off Admiralty Head, near Seattle, in company with Destroyer Divisions 32 and 33 to escort Henderson in which the President of the United States, Warren G. Harding, was embarked. Woodbury consequently formed part of the presidential escort as the transport sailed through the fleet.

Once her duties in connection with the Presidential review were completed, Woodbury returned to the routine of exercises, acting as a target for the gunnery drills carried out by Battleship Division 4. She later conducted tactical exercises while screening the battleships of that division, before she put in at Lake Washington, via the Lake Washington Ship Canal, on 4 August. She remained there for a little over a week before she got underway on the 13th for Port Townsend.

After torpedo-firing and gunnery evolutions out of Port Townsend in company with William Jones, Woodbury got underway for Keyport, Washington, en route back to Seattle and Puget Sound. Reaching the navy yard on the 20th, she embarked the Commander in Chief, United States Fleet (CinCUS), Admiral Robert E. Coontz, his staff, and a party of congressmen at 0840 on the 22nd. With the CinCUS' four-starred flag at her main, Woodbury cast off from Pier 5, Puget Sound Navy Yard, and sailed for Keyport. There, Admiral Coontz disembarked with his staff and the congressmen and inspected the naval torpedo station.

The admiral and his party then reembarked in the destroyer, and she returned them to the navy yard, where they left the ship at 1110. At noon, however, the CinCUS returned on board. Woodbury subsequently arrived at Seattle's Bell Street Dock at 1310 and disembarked the admiral. The next day, the destroyer carried Admiral Coontz to his flagship, the armored cruiser Seattle (CA-11). Over the ensuing days, Woodbury also carried, as passengers, Rear Admiral William C. Cole, chief of staff for the CinCUS, and Rear Admiral Luther E. Gregory, CEC, the Chief of the Bureau of Yards and Docks.

After completing her tour in the waters off the Pacific Northwest coast of the United States, Woodbury departed Port Angeles and headed south. She conducted tactical maneuvers and exercises with battleships en route and stood into San Francisco Bay on 31 August.

Woodbury remained at San Francisco for a week. She got underway on the morning of 8 September 1923 with other destroyers of Squadron 11, bound for San Diego, and while skirting the coast over the ensuing hours, conducted tactical exercises and maneuvers. In addition, the ships were making a 20-knot (37 km/h) speed run.

Led by the leader, Delphy (DD-261), the squadron steamed into the worsening weather. Later that evening, Delphy - basing her movements on an inaccurate navigational bearing - made a fateful turn, believing she was heading into the Santa Barbara Channel. In fact, she was headed, as were all of the ships astern of her in follow-the-leader fashion, for jagged rock pinnacles and reefs off Point Arguello.

Shortly after 2105, tragedy struck Squadron 11's ships, one by one in the Honda Point Disaster. Seven ships, led by Delphy and including Woodbury, ran hard aground. Some of the destroyers farther astern saw what was happening and managed to avoid disaster by quick-thinking seamanship.

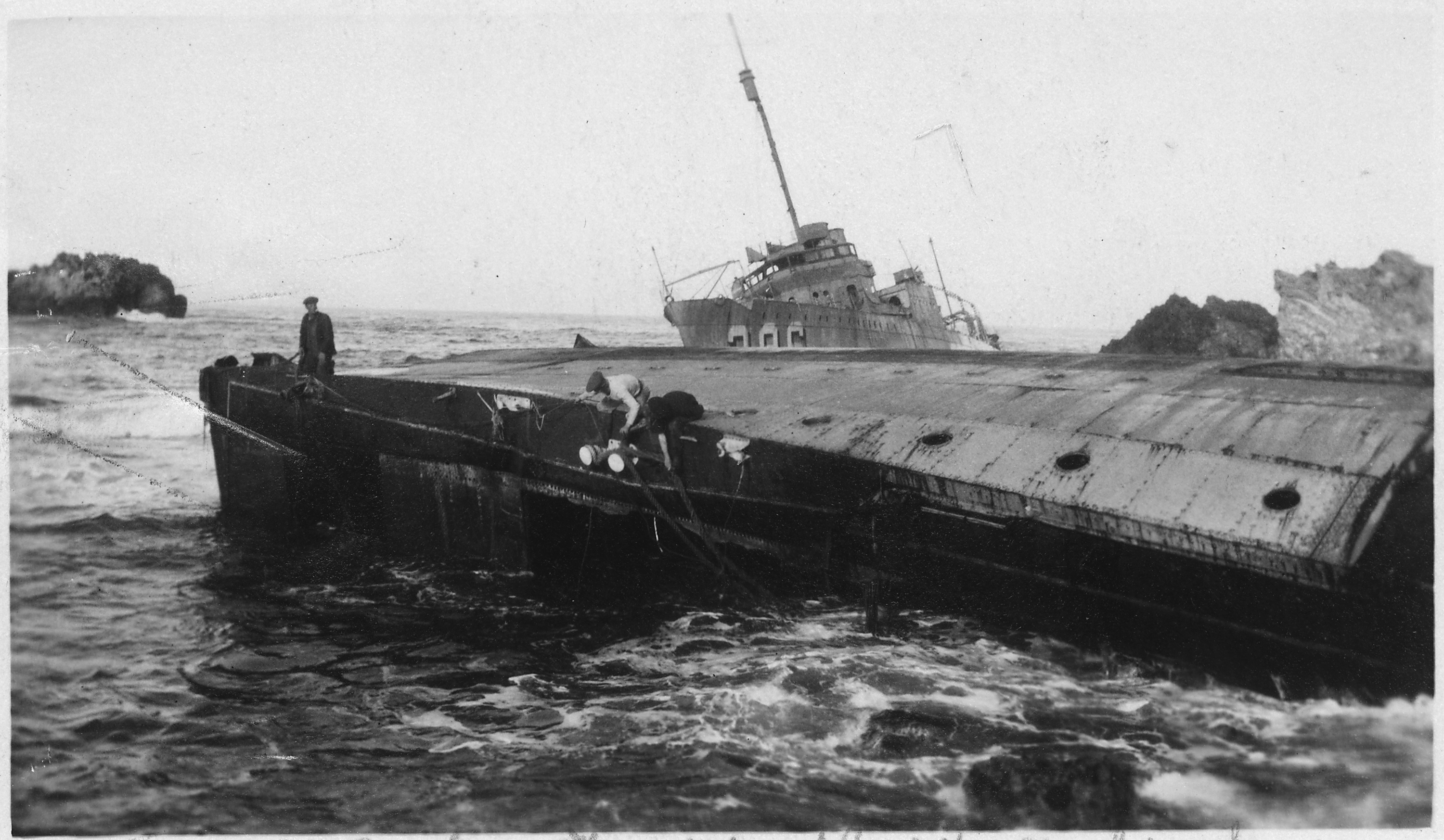
U.S.S. Woodbury on beach.

Woodbury came to rest alongside a small island— later nicknamed "Woodbury Rock"—that she used as a permanent anchor. Volunteers took across four lines and rigged them across the gap of tumbling surf between the destroyer and the rock that would later bear her name. Meanwhile, although water was pouring into the forward boiler room and engine room spaces, Commander Louis P. Davis, the ship's commanding officer, ordered full speed astern. Ensign Horatio Ridout, the engineer officer, and his men worked to try to produce the horsepower necessary to get the ship out of her predicament but their efforts were brought to nought when all power failed, due to the flooding, at 2230.

As the floodwaters below engulfed and drowned out her power supply and it became impossible to move the ship, Cmdr. Davis turned to his reserve plan. While Woodbury settled astern, waves struck her with some force, causing her bow to rise and fall rhythmically. The hawsers tenuously connecting the ship with "Woodbury Rock" stretched taut and then sagged with the movement of ship and sea. Nevertheless, one by one, Woodbury's crew clambered across the chasm, monkey-fashion, in a well-organized operation to abandon ship. Later, men from the stranded sister ship Fuller (DD-297) also reached "Woodbury Rock."

Ultimately, all of Woodbury's crew reached safety, some taken off to Percival (DD-298) by the fishing boat Bueno Amor de Roma, under the command of a Captain Noceti. The rough log entry for Woodbury, dated 9 September 1923, sums up the ship's status as of that date: "Woodbury on rocks off Point Arguello, California, abandoned by all hands and under supervision of a salvage party composed of men from various 11th squadron ships."

== Fate ==
Officially placed out of commission on 26 October 1923, the ship was struck from the Navy list on 20 November of the same year. She was simultaneously ordered sold as a hulk, but a subsequent sale, on 6 February 1924 to a Santa Monica, California-based salvage firm, the Fryn Salvage Company, was never consummated. Yet another sale, to a Robert J. Smith of Oakland, California, is recorded as having been awarded on 19 October 1925, but whether or not the hulk was scrapped is not recorded. However she, and her wrecked sister ships, were still not moved by late August 1929 for she, and most of the others, may be clearly seen in film footage taken from the German airship Graf Zeppelin as she headed towards Los Angeles on her circumnavigation of the globe; the film footage is used in the documentary film Farewell (2009).
