= USS Stoddert =

Clemson-class destroyer

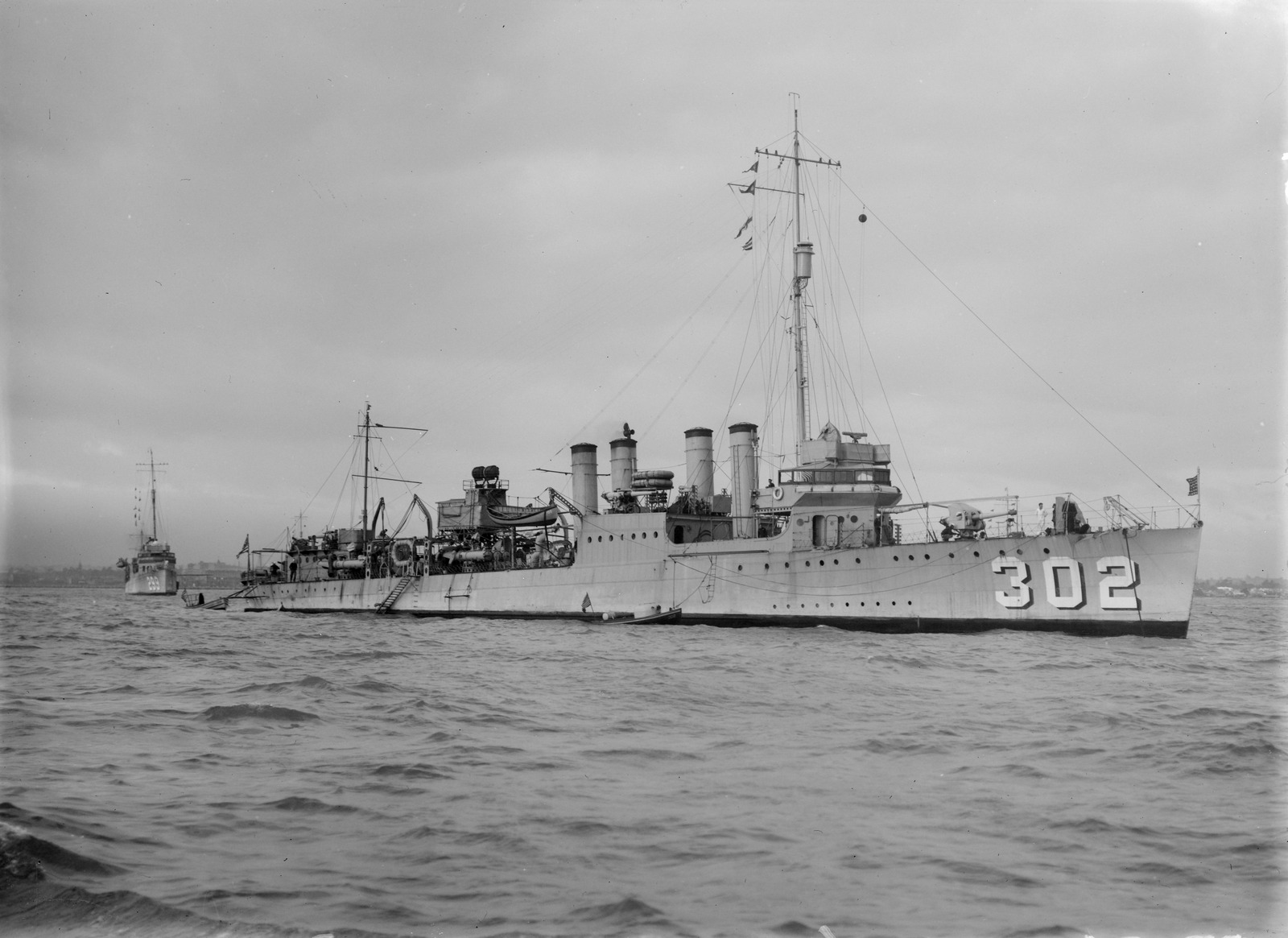
- USS Stoddert in 1925

History

United States
- Namesake: Benjamin Stoddert
- Builder: Bethlehem Shipbuilding Corporation, Union Iron Works, San Francisco
- Laid down: 4 July 1918
- Launched: 8 January 1919
- Commissioned: 30 June 1920
- Decommissioned: 10 January 1933
- Stricken: 5 June 1935
- Fate: Sold for scrapping, 30 August 1935

General characteristics
- Class & type: Clemson-class destroyer
- Displacement: 1,215 tons
- Length: 314 feet 4 inches (95.81 m)
- Beam: 31 feet 8 inches (9.65 m)
- Draft: 9 feet 10 inches (3.00 m)
- Propulsion: 26,500 shp (20 MW); geared turbines, twin propellers
- Speed: 35 knots (65 km/h)
- Range: 4,900 nmi (9,100 km); @ 15 kt
- Complement: 130 officers and enlisted
- Armament: 4 × 4 in (102 mm)/50 guns, 1 × 3 in (76 mm)/25 gun, 12 × 21 inch (533 mm) torpedo tubes

USS Stoddert (DD-302/AG-18) was a Clemson-class destroyer in the United States Navy following World War I. She was named for Benjamin Stoddert.

== History ==
Stoddert was laid down on 4 July 1918 at San Francisco, California, by the Bethlehem Shipbuilding Corporation; launched on 8 January 1919; sponsored by Mrs. Gavin McNab; and commissioned on 30 June 1920.

Stoddert joined Division 33 of the Reserve Destroyer Squadron, Pacific Fleet, and completed fitting-out at Mare Island Navy Yard. Between 14 August 1920 and 7 January 1921, she operated along the coast of California, participating in tactical exercises with Battleship Squadron 5 and the cruiser Birmingham (CL-2). She also engaged in antiaircraft practice, target towing, and gun drills off Coronado Island with her own division. On 7 January 1921, she departed San Diego with the Pacific Fleet to join the Atlantic Fleet in the Panama Canal Zone for winter maneuvers farther south. From 22 January to 15 February, the combined fleets held strategic, tactical, and gunnery exercises on a cruise to Valparaíso, Chile, and back to Panama. Following the inter-fleet championships conducted at Balboa, Stoddert headed north and, on 5 March, reached San Diego, California where she resumed normal operations with Division 33.

In July, she steamed farther north to the state of Washington where she exercised with Kennedy (DD-306). After maneuvers off the coasts of Oregon and California, she entered Puget Sound Navy Yard on 15 December; completed overhaul on 7 February 1922; and, four days later, joined Destroyer Division (DesDiv) 32. She resumed operations along the west coast. Proceeding to the south on 8 February 1923 with the Battle Fleet and Fleet Base Force, Stoddert took part in maneuvers en route to the Panama Canal Zone to conduct fleet problems to test the defense of the strategic canal. While in Panama during the month of March, the fleet engaged in combined tactical and strategic maneuvers, held experimental torpedo practice, carried out various experimental firings against and finally sank Coast Battleship No. 4, the former Iowa. Upon the completion of the combined maneuvers on 30 March, Stoddert returned to the Bremerton Navy Yard on 22 April.

The destroyer cruised the Washington coastline until the end of August, visiting Astoria, Tacoma, Seattle, Bellingham, Port Angeles, and Port Townsend. In July, she escorted Henderson (AP-1), in which President Warren G. Harding was embarked. In September, she steamed south to San Diego Harbor where the destroyers of her division formed a circle and scattered flowers on the water in commemoration of the men lost in the Honda Point Disaster.

From 22 October 1923 until 2 January 1924, Stoddert took part in fleet maneuvers and torpedo exercises at San Diego, sailing to the south on 16 January. Transiting the Panama Canal with the Battle Fleet from 18 to 25 January, she was engaged with the Scouting Fleet in maneuvers designed to test the defenses and facilities of the Canal Zone. During the winter, the combined fleets were based at Culebra, and on 22 April 1924, Stoddert arrived back at San Diego with the Battle Fleet.

Cruising with Battle Fleet destroyer squadrons, Stoddert operated along the west coast, principally at San Diego, San Pedro, Port Angeles, Tacoma, Seattle, and San Francisco, until 27 April 1925, on which date she arrived in Hawaii for exercises with United States Fleet. En route, the fleet engaged in a joint Army and Navy problem which simulated an attack on the Hawaiian Islands by a large overseas force and was designed to test to the fullest extent the defenses of the Hawaiian Islands.

On 1 July 1925, the destroyer sailed from Pearl Harbor with the Battle Fleet on a good will cruise via Samoa to Australia and New Zealand. The ships visited Melbourne, Dunedin, and Lyttelton, and the officers and men were extensively entertained in all these ports. This visit furthered the amicable relations existing between the United States and Australia and New Zealand. Stoddert returned to her base at San Diego on 26 September.

She resumed operations with the Battle Fleet along the west coast, taking time to attend the Navy Day celebration at San Diego from 21 to 27 October 1925 and the Founders Day festivities held at Astoria, Oregon, between 20 July and 23 July 1926. After an overhaul at the Bremerton Navy Yard, she again sailed south, via San Diego, arriving on 22 March 1927 at Balboa where she and Paul Hamilton (DD-307) joined the Battle Fleet. Maneuvering with the fleet at Guantanamo Bay, Gonaïves, and New York, she went on alone to the Boston Navy Yard for repairs on her way to Hampton Roads where she took part in a presidential review and rejoined her fleet. Transiting the canal between 11 and 17 June, Stoddert arrived back in San Diego on 25 June for exercises with Destroyer Squadron 11. For the remainder of 1927 and until the end of April 1928, she operated along the west coast, principally at San Diego, San Pedro, Tacoma, Port Townsend, Bremerton, and Port Angeles.

Her one special assignment took her to Honolulu for emergency assistance to the Dole flight, a non-stop airplane race between San Francisco and Honolulu, starting on 16 August 1927. Upon receipt of reports of planes missing, an extensive search was started under the direction of the Commander in Chief, Battle Fleet; Commandant, 12th Naval District; and Commandant, 14th Naval District. A total of 54 ships of the Battle Fleet took part in this search between 17 August and 5 September, covering approximately 350,000 square miles (910,000 km^{2}).

On 28 April 1928, Stoddert arrived at Honolulu, via San Francisco, for Battle Fleet exercises at Lahaina, Pearl Harbor, and Hilo with Submarine Divisions 9 and 14. Returning to San Diego on 23 June 1928, she cruised and maneuvered between her customary ports along the Pacific Coast, deviating from her exercises on 18 November and 19 November 1928 to act as part of the honor escort for President-elect Herbert Hoover on board battleship Maryland (BB-46) from San Diego to Los Angeles.

Under terms of the London Treaty for Reduction of Naval Armament, Stoddert was decommissioned on 20 May 1930 and delivered to the Mare Island Navy Yard for retention by conversion to a radio-controlled target ship. This was in accordance with the Navy's decision to fit out a unit of three destroyers as radio-controlled light targets for the purpose of conducting Fleet exercises requiring' the use of high speed targets. Stoddert, designated Light Target No. 1, received the initial installation. Her experimental radio control apparatus paved the way for later fitting out of remote-controlled Boggs (DD-136) and Lamberton (DD-119), and pointed the way for the more elaborate equipment of the famous radio-controlled target ship Utah (AG-16).

She was recommissioned on 6 April 1931; reclassified as miscellaneous auxiliary, AG-18, on 30 June 1931 and redesignated DD-302 on 16 April 1932. After experimental operations, she became an element of Mobile Target Division 1. From her base at San Diego, Stoddert was the target for dive bombing, aerial torpedoes, and fleet gunnery exercises along the coast of California. She spent much of her time as the dive-bombing and torpedo attack target ship for the aircraft of Saratoga (CV-3).

== Fate ==
The destroyer was decommissioned at San Diego on 10 January 1933, many of her officers and crew transferring to mobile target ship Lamberton (AG-21). Her name was struck from the Navy List on 5 June 1935, and she was sold for scrapping on 30 August 1935.

== See also ==
- USS Benjamin Stoddert (DDG-22), another ship named for Stoddert.
