= Honda Point disaster =

Largest peacetime loss of U.S. Navy ships

- Aerial view of the seven destroyers lost to the disaster: Nicholas and S. P. Lee at top left; Delphy, capsized and broken in the small cove at left; Young, capsized at top center; Chauncey, upright ahead of Young; Woodbury on the rocks at right center; and Fuller on the rocks at lower right.
- Date: September 8, 1923
- Time: 21:05 local
- Location: Honda (Pedernales) Point, near Lompoc, California, U.S.; 34°36′11″N 120°38′43″W
- Deaths: 23
- Injuries: 100+

The Honda Point disaster was the largest peacetime loss of U.S. Navy ships in history. On the foggy and moonless night of September 8, 1923, seven destroyers traveling at 20 knots (37 km/h) ran aground and wrecked at California's Honda Point (also known as Point Pedernales, with offshore outcroppings known as Devil's Jaw). The location was several miles north of the Santa Barbara Channel, the ships' intended route. Two other destroyers grounded, but were able to maneuver free off the rocks. Twenty-three sailors died; 745 were rescued.

Navigational errors, compounded by unusual ocean currents attributed to Japan's Great Kantō earthquake, were the likely cause. A court-martial board convicted the squadron's commander Edward H. Watson and the acting navigator Donald T. Hunter, and stripped them of seniority for any future promotions.

== Geography ==
Government maps/charts including Point Pedernales and Point Arguello
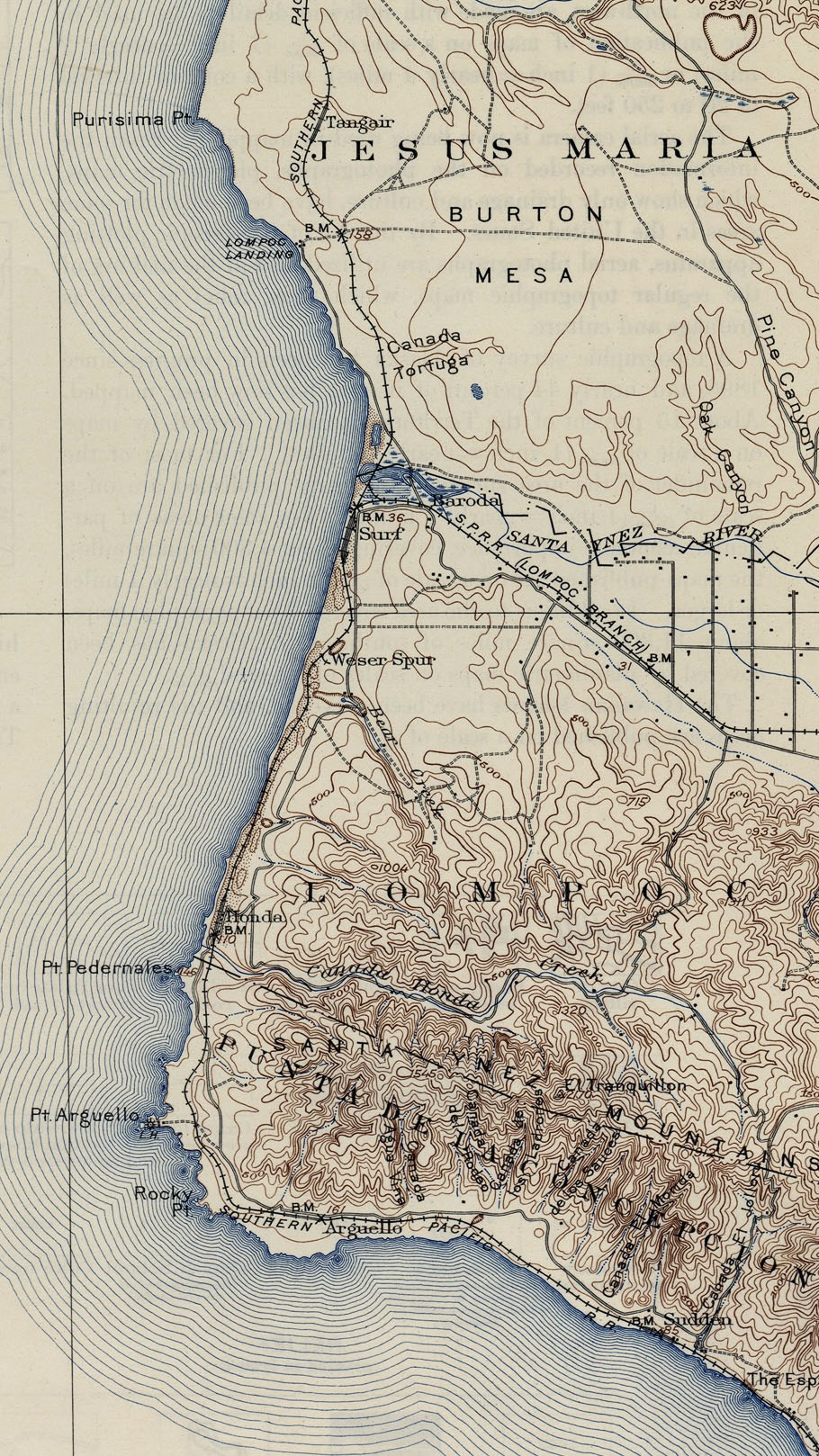
USGS (1904)

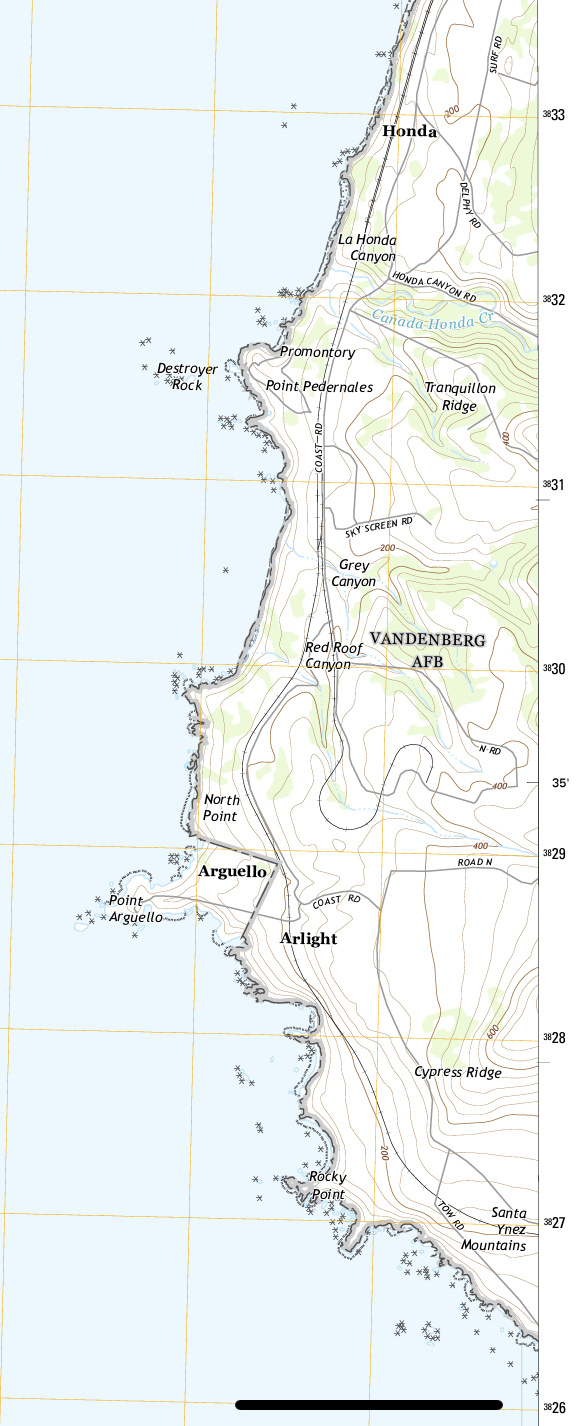
USGS (2015)

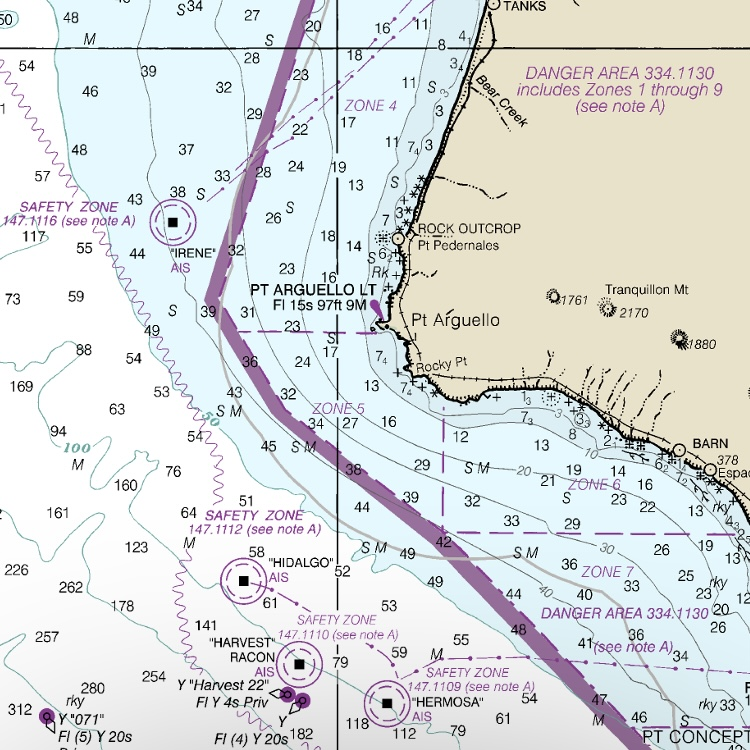
NOAA (2023)

Honda Point, also called Point Pedernales, is just north of Point Arguello, along the Gaviota Coast of Santa Barbara County, California. The sea at Honda Point includes a series of outcroppings known collectively today as Woodbury Rocks, one of which is named Destroyer Rock on navigational charts. Nicknamed the Devil's Jaw by Spanish explorers in the 16th century, the area has been a navigational hazard ever since. It is a few miles north of the entrance to the heavily trafficked Santa Barbara Channel, which was the intended route of the destroyers involved in the disaster. Honda took its name from the local Cañada Honda Creek, Spanish for "deep little canyon". To the south of Honda, Point Arguello Light and Point Conception Light marked the coast.

=== Honda Point today ===
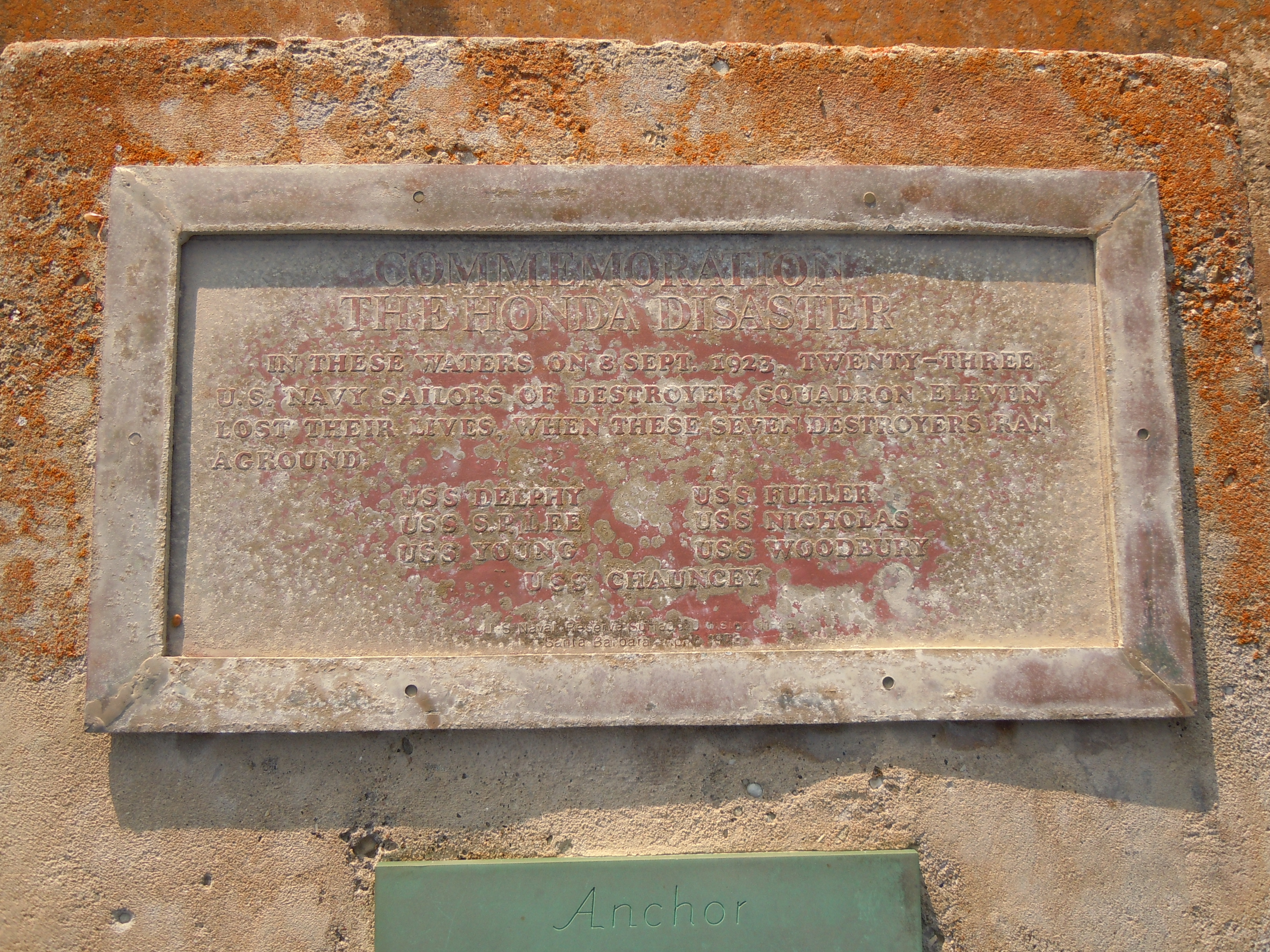
Plaque commemorating the disaster

Honda Point now is part of Vandenberg Space Force Base, near the city of Lompoc, California. There is a plaque and a memorial to the disaster at the site. The memorial includes a ship's bell from USS Chauncey. A propeller and a propeller shaft from USS Delphy are on display outside the Veterans' Memorial Building, in Lompoc.

== Incident ==
=== Squadron exercise ===
On September 8, 1923, fourteen ships of Destroyer Squadron Eleven (DesRon 11) were steaming south from San Francisco Bay at 20 knots (37 km/h) in a column led by USS Delphy as flagship. All were Clemson-class destroyers, less than five years old, heading toward the Santa Barbara Channel that night and then to San Diego Bay, on a 24-hour exercise from northern to southern California.

Captain Edward H. Watson, an 1895 graduate of the United States Naval Academy (USNA) and the son of an admiral, commanded the squadron. He was assigned as its commodore in July 1922, his first time as a squadron commander.

=== Navigational errors ===
The flagship Delphy had the primary responsibility for navigation. Lieutenant Commander Donald T. Hunter was its captain and was also acting as the squadron's navigator, overriding his ship's navigator, Lieutenant (junior grade) Lawrence Blodgett. As the Delphy traveled south parallel to the California coast, poor visibility led Hunter to rely on the age-old technique of dead reckoning, estimating positions based on compass headings and approximate speeds, after the crew last sighted land that morning.

The squadron did have radio direction finding (RDF) equipment, and exchanged multiple signals with a station at Point Arguello. However, RDF was still new in 1923, and Hunter dismissed most of the radio bearings he received, believing them to be unreliable.

The crew did not use its fathometer line to take depth soundings for navigation, as this would have required the ships to slow down for the measurements. The ships were performing an exercise that simulated wartime conditions, and Captain Watson wanted the squadron to make a fast passage to San Diego. So, he reportedly overruled Blodgett's request to slow for soundings.

Despite the high speed and heavy coastal fog, Watson ordered all ships to travel in close formation. Based on Hunter's dead reckoning calculations, Watson ordered him to turn east to course 095 at 21:00, supposedly heading into the Santa Barbara Channel. In hindsight, the radio bearings proved generally correct that the squadron was several miles northeast of where Watson and Hunter thought they were. Turning east too soon at the head of the column, within minutes, the Delphy ran aground at Honda Point and six other ships followed immediately and sank. Another two destroyers also hit the rocks but survived.

USS Kennedy had intercepted radio bearings from Point Arguello to the Delphy and to the Stoddert. Commander Walter Roper, in charge of the column's endmost Division 32 (Kennedy, Paul Hamilton, Stoddert, Thompson), correctly feared that the squadron was too far north and that Watson would be unreceptive to last-minute debate. When the Kennedy reached the turning point, Roper ordered his ships to slow down and then to stop, and avoided running aground.

=== Ocean conditions ===
The squadron's acting navigator Hunter later told investigators that "abnormal currents caused by the Japanese earthquake" might have contributed to the large error in his dead reckoning calculations. The magnitude-8 Great Kantō earthquake had destroyed most of Tokyo and Yokohama on September 1 in Japan, which was August 31 in California, eight days before the Honda disaster. Unusually large swells and strong currents occurred off the coast of California and persisted for a number of days, unrelated to any known windstorms, as hundreds of significant aftershocks continued around Japan's Pacific coast. Before and after Destroyer Squadron Eleven reached Honda Point, several other ships encountered navigational problems as a result of the abnormal currents. Earlier the same day, the mail steamship SS Cuba ran aground nearby.

As the destroyers ran their exercise down the California coast, they made their way through these swells and currents. The navigators were unable to take into account the unusual sea condition, and their estimations of speed and bearing used for dead reckoning were being affected. As a result of what the Navy now calls "a combination of abnormally strong currents ... and navigational complacency", the entire squadron was off course and positioned near the rocky coast of Honda Point instead of the open ocean of the Santa Barbara Channel. Once the error in navigation occurred, the strong currents and swells were coupled with windy weather, moonless darkness, and thick coastal fog, quickly leading the ships into the rocks.

=== Ships involved ===
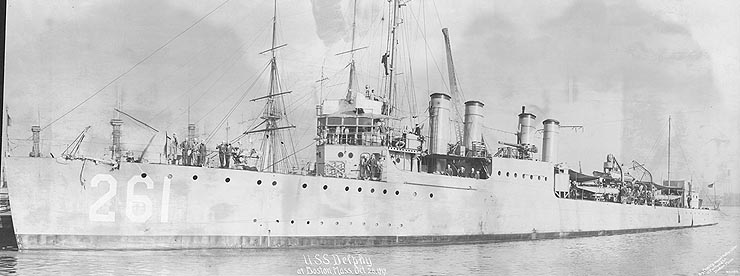
USS Delphy prior to grounding

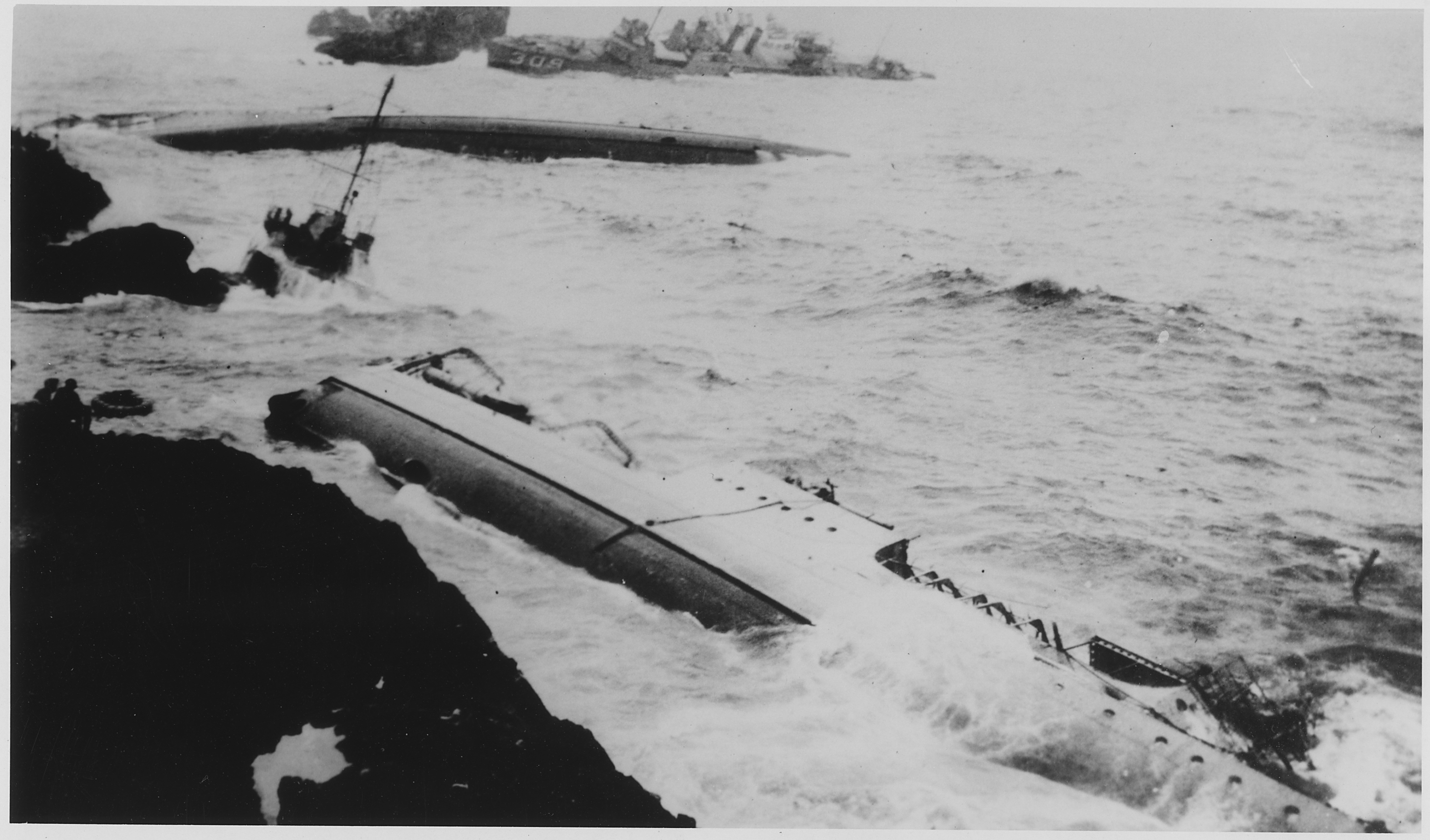
USS Delphy (foreground) broken in half at Honda Point

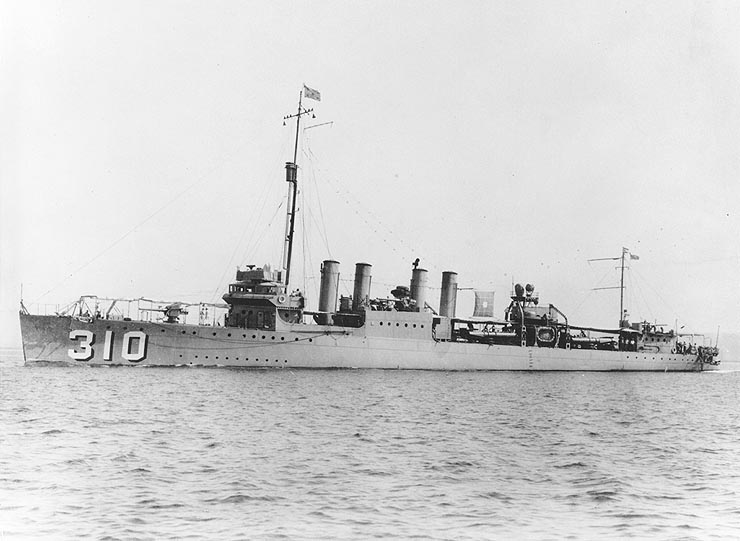
USS S. P. Lee prior to grounding

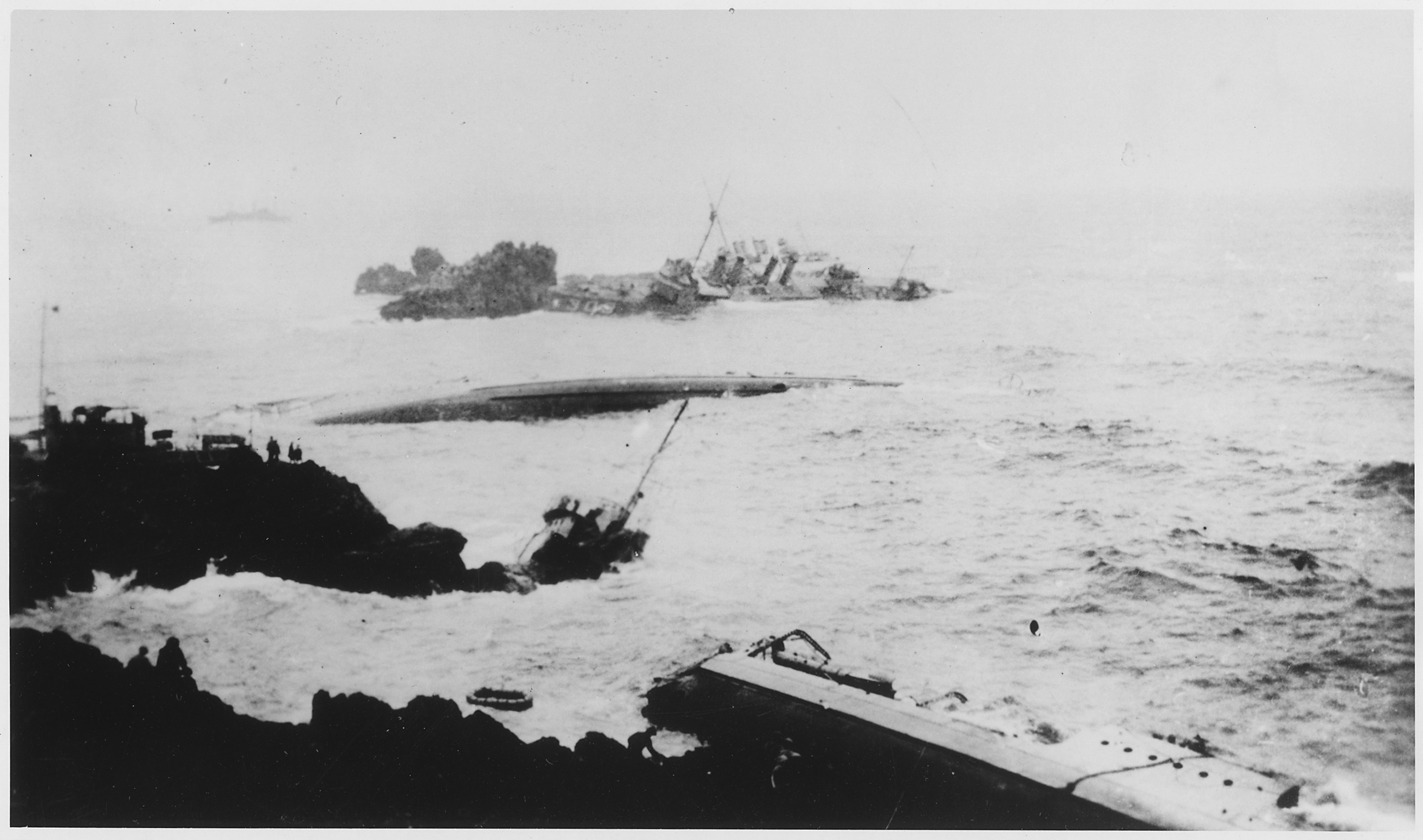
The capsized USS Young (center) at Honda Point.

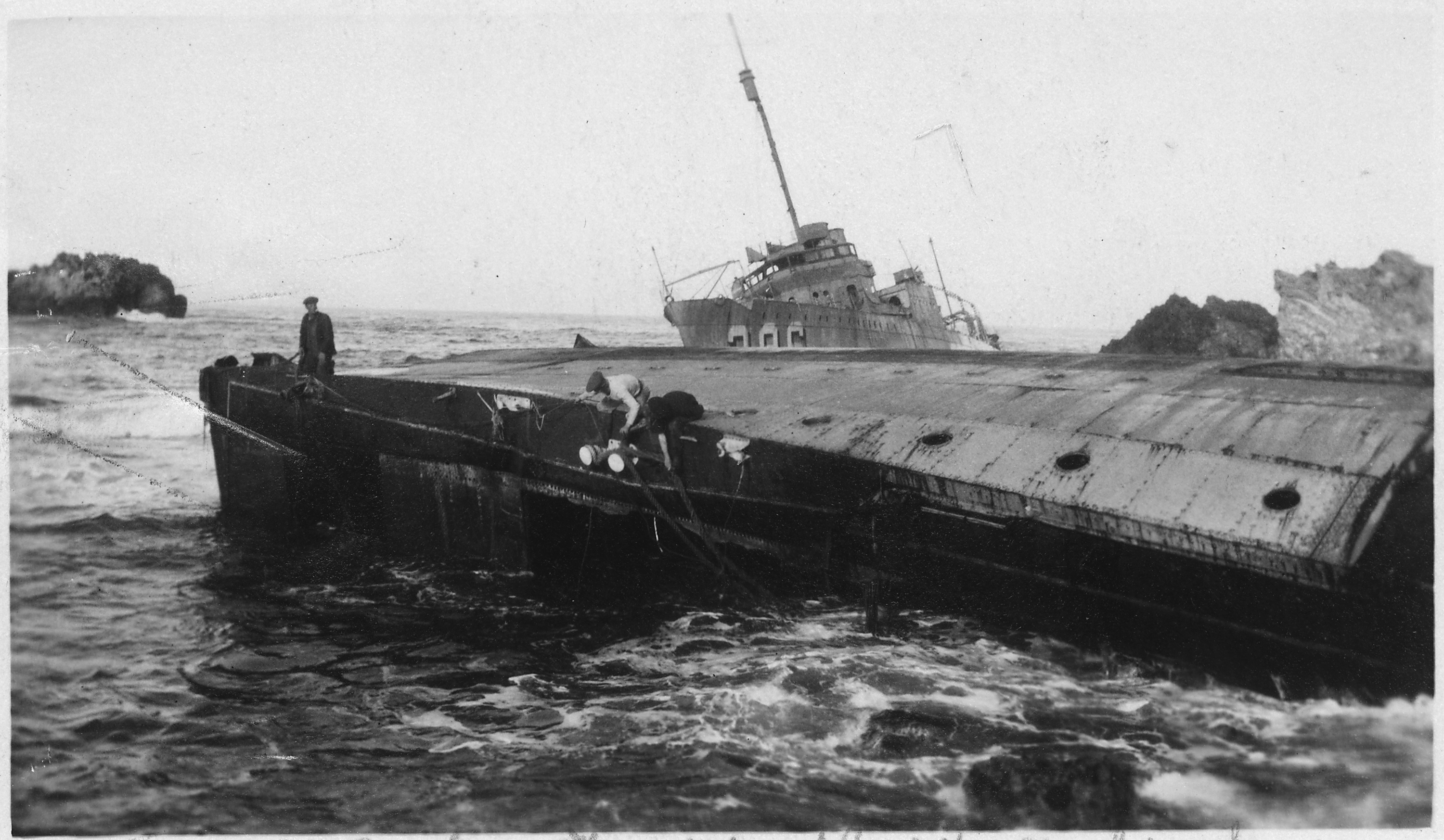
USS Woodbury on beach

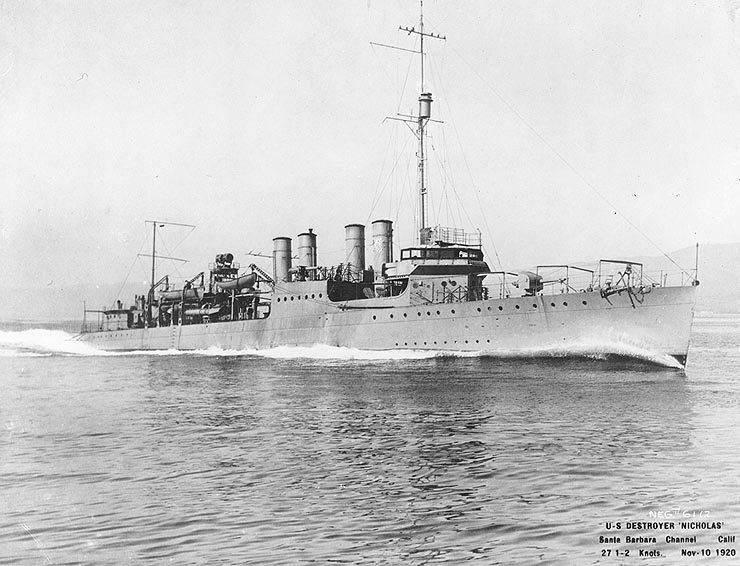
USS Nicholas

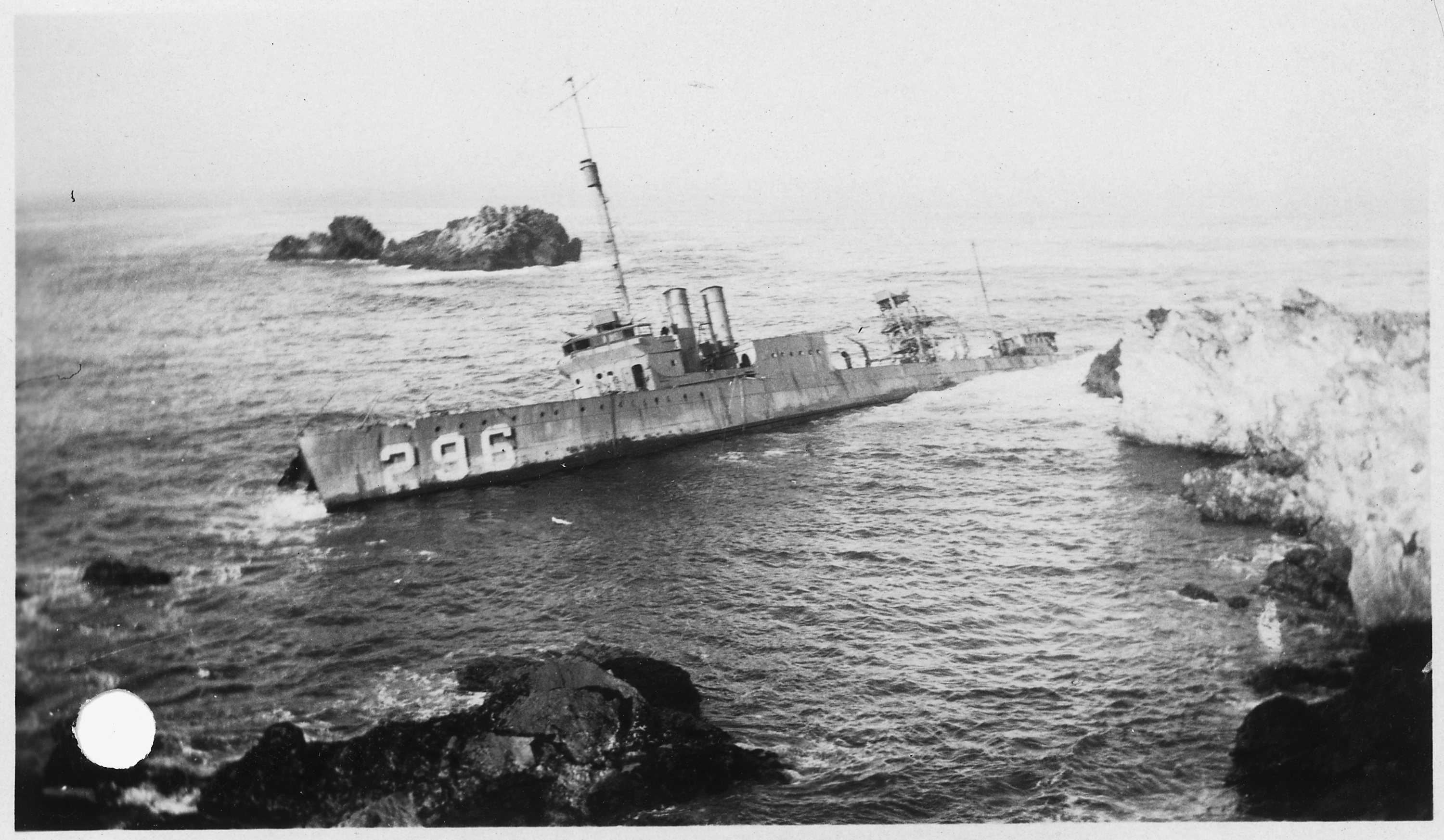
USS Chauncey

The lost destroyers were:

- USS Delphy (DD-261), the flagship of the squadron. She ran aground on the shore at 20 knots (37 km/h) and then sounded her siren, which helped some of the later ships in the column avoid grounding. Three of her crew died. Eugene Dooman, a State Department expert on Japan, who survived, was aboard as a civilian guest of Captain Watson, whom he had met in Japan.
- USS S. P. Lee (DD-310), flagship of Destroyer Division 33 under Captain Robert Morris, USNA Class of 1900. She was following a few hundred yards behind the Delphy. She saw the Delphy suddenly stop, and turned to port (left) in response, but still ran aground on the coast.
- USS Young (DD-312), commanded by future admiral William Calhoun, made no move to turn. She tore her hull open on submerged rocks, and the inrush of water quickly capsized her onto her starboard (right) side. Twenty men died.
- USS Woodbury (DD-309) turned to starboard, but struck an offshore rock.
- USS Nicholas (DD-311) turned to port and also hit a rock.
- USS Fuller (DD-297) stuck next to Woodbury.
- USS Chauncey (DD-296) ran aground while attempting to rescue sailors from the capsized Young.

Minor damage was recorded by:

- USS Farragut (DD-300), flagship of Destroyer Division 31 under Commander William S. Pye, USNA Class of 1901. Sixth in the squadron formation, between Nicholas and Fuller, she ran aground but was able to extricate herself and was not lost.
- USS Somers (DD-301) was lightly damaged.

The remaining five ships avoided the rocks:

- USS Percival (DD-298)
- USS Kennedy (DD-306), flagship of Destroyer Division 32 under Commander Walter G. Roper, USNA Class of 1898.
- USS Paul Hamilton (DD-307)
- USS Stoddert (DD-302)
- USS Thompson (DD-305)

== Rescue efforts ==
Rescue activity promptly followed the accident, and was widely commended for preventing an even higher death toll. Local ranchers, who were alerted by the noises of the disaster, rigged up breeches buoys from the surrounding clifftops and lowered them to the ships that had run aground. Fishermen nearby who had seen or heard the tragedy picked up crew members from USS Fuller and USS Woodbury.

Surviving crew members of the capsized Young were able to climb to safety on the nearby USS Chauncey via a lifeline. The squadron's five destroyers that avoided running aground were also able to contribute to rescue efforts, by picking up sailors who had been thrown into the oil-coated surf and jagged rocks, and by assisting those who were stuck aboard the wreckage of other ships. Emergency trains along the coastal railroad also evacuated sailors, starting with the worst injured.

After the disaster, the government did not attempt to salvage any of the seven wrecks at Honda Point, due to the extensive damage each ship sustained. The wrecks themselves, along with the equipment that remained on them, were sold to a scrap merchant for a total of $1,035. The wrecked ships seemingly were still not moved by August 1929, when they appeared in film footage taken from the German airship Graf Zeppelin on her circumnavigation of the globe; the footage is used in the semi-documentary film Farewell (2009).

== Court martial ==
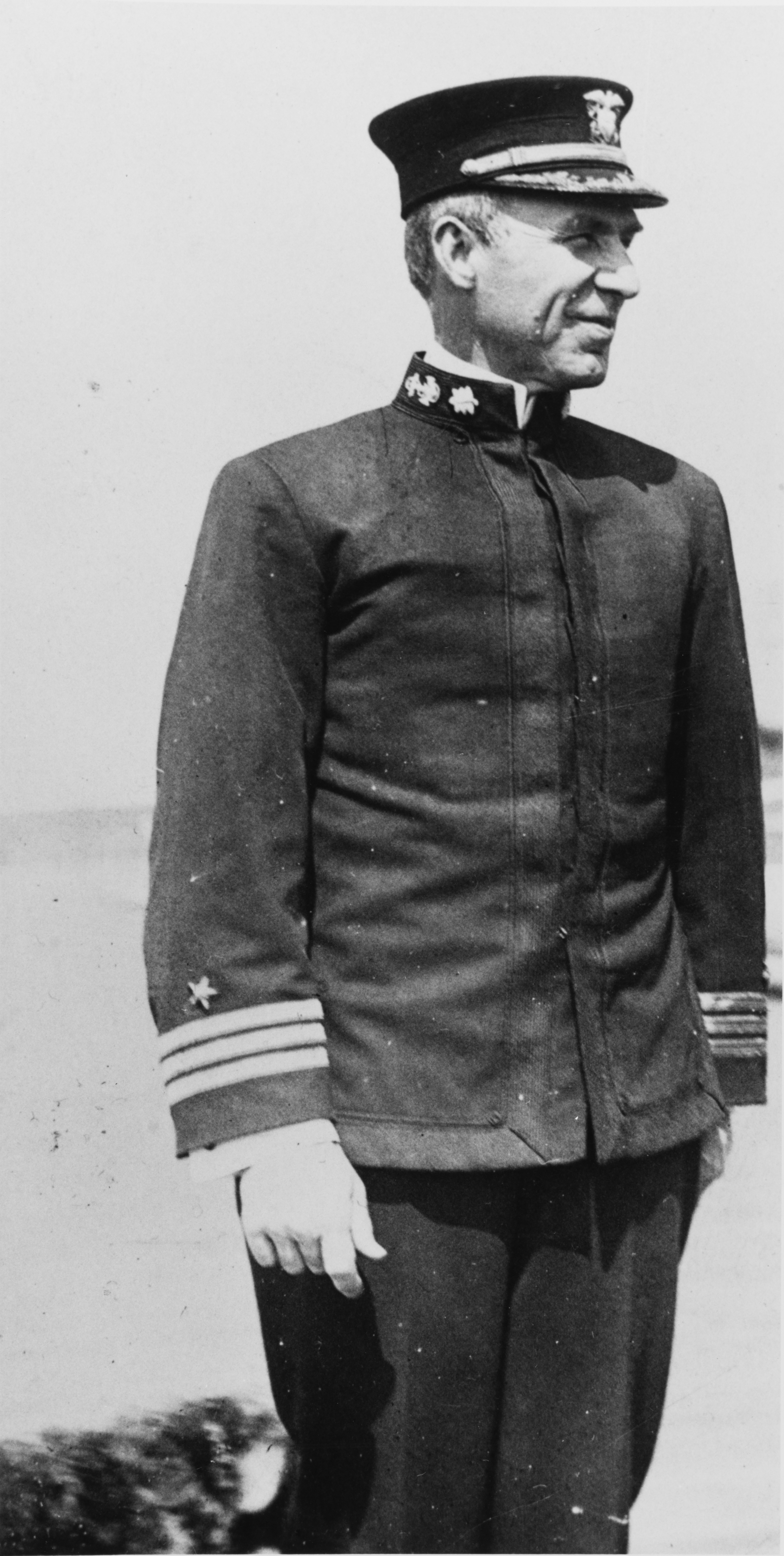
Edward H. Watson, 1915

The seven-officer Navy court-martial board, led by Vice Admiral Henry A. Wiley, commander battleship divisions of the Battle Fleet, ruled that the disaster was the fault of the squadron's commander Watson and the flagship's acting navigator Hunter. The board assigned partial blame to the captain of each ship that ran aground, following the tradition that a captain's first responsibility is to his own ship, even when in formation. Eleven officers involved were brought before general courts-martial on charges of negligence and culpable inefficiency to perform one's duty. This was the largest single group of officers ever court-martialed in the U.S. Navy's history.

The unusual public trial proceedings started quickly and concluded in November 1923. The court ruled that the Honda Point disaster was "directly attributable to bad errors of judgment and faulty navigation". Captain Watson and navigator Hunter were found guilty and stripped of their seniority for any future promotions. The other nine court-martialed officers were acquitted, one after the fleet commander overturned a conviction. The Navy left numerous inconsistencies unresolved, and President Calvin Coolidge himself remarked: "Court martial has been very lenient with everybody."

Captain Watson, who had been defended by future admiral Thomas Tingey Craven, was commended by his peers and the government for assuming full responsibility for the disaster. He could have tried to blame a variety of causes, but instead, he set an example by accepting the responsibility entirely on his shoulders.

A Court of Inquiry led by Rear Admiral William V. Pratt, aided by future admirals George C. Day and David F. Sellers, recommended Commander Roper for a Letter of Commendation for successfully turning his division away from danger.

The Honda disaster and its aftermath further eroded the reputation of Navy Secretary Edwin Denby, who was already entangled in the Teapot Dome scandal. In February 1924, five months after the shipwrecks, he resigned and formally disapproved of the court-martial acquittals.

Along with the court martial of William V Pratt, Wade Mahon a rear rudder attendant was looked into though his trial was quickly dismissed due to lack of evidence and his sincere apologies offered to his superior. If his trial was to go through it would have taken place on December 1924.

== See also ==
- Scilly naval disaster of 1707 – loss of four British warships upon rocks in the Celtic Sea
