= William L. Calhoun (admiral) =

United States Navy admiral (1884–1963)

- Born: William Lowndes Calhoun; July 13, 1884; Palatka, Florida, U.S.
- Died: October 20, 1963 (aged 79)
- Burial place: Fort Rosecrans National Cemetery
- Military career
- Allegiance: United States of America
- Branch: United States Navy
- Service years: 1906–1946
- Rank: Admiral
- Commands: USS California; Pacific Fleet Base Force; Service Forces Pacific Fleet; South Pacific Area
- Conflicts: World War I; World War II
- Awards: Navy Distinguished Service Medal; Legion of Merit (2)

William Lowndes Calhoun (July 13, 1884 – October 20, 1963) was a United States Navy officer who served in World War I and World War II, eventually attaining the rank of admiral during World War II.

== Early years ==
William Lowndes Calhoun was a native of Palatka, Florida. He joined the U.S. Navy in about 1902, and graduated from the United States Naval Academy in 1906. Among his classmates were many future admirals including Roland M. Brainard, Arthur L. Bristol, Milo F. Draemel, Robert L. Ghormley, William A. Glassford, Charles C. Hartigan, Aubrey W. Fitch, Frank J. Fletcher, Isaac C. Kidd, John S. McCain Sr., Leigh Noyes, Ferdinand L. Reichmuth, Sherwoode A. Taffinder, John H. Towers, Russell Willson, and Thomas Withers.

== Naval service ==
Calhoun served in various assignments until 1915 when he qualified as a submariner. He then commanded a submarine division; served on the battleships USS Mississippi and USS Maryland; commanded the destroyer USS Young from 1921 until it ran aground in the 1923 Honda Point Disaster; and commanded a destroyer division.

His shore assignments between 1915 and 1937 included service as Inspector of Ordnance at Mare Island Naval Shipyard, training at the Naval War College, and duties at the San Diego Naval Base.

From about 1937 to about 1939 he served as commanding officer of the battleship USS California. From December 1939 he served as Commander, Base Force, Pacific Fleet. On 27 February 1942 his title changed to commander service for5ce, Pacific Fleet (ComServPac). He served in this capacity until the 13 March 1945 when he was assigned to command the South Pacific Area. He served in this capacity until October 1945.

== Retirement ==
Calhoun retired on 1 December 1946. He died in 1963 at a naval hospital.

He was a great-grandson of U.S. Vice President John C. Calhoun.

== Decorations and awards ==
- Submarine Warfare Insignia

- Navy Distinguished Service Medal with gold star.
- Legion of Merit with gold star and 'V' device.
- Nicaraguan Campaign Medal
- World War I Victory Medal
- American Defense Service Medal
- American Campaign Medal
- Asiatic-Pacific Campaign Medal with two bronze stars.
- World War II Victory Medal

== See also ==
- World War I
- World War II

== References/ Sources ==
- History of United States Naval Operations in World War II (Samuel Eliot Morison).
- Hyperwar Naval Chronology
- Time Magazine Article
- Haldane, David (February 2, 1986), "Sea Yields a Treasure From Ship That Went Down 62 Years Ago", The Los Angeles Times, p. 1
