= USS Nicholas (DD-311) =

Clemson-class destroyer

Coordinates: 34.6061°N 120.6409°W

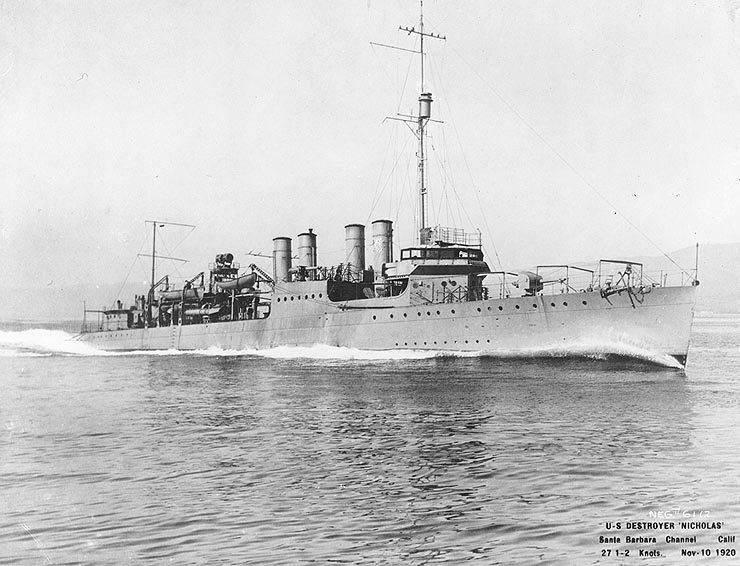
- USS Nicholas running trials, 10 November 1920

History

United States
- Namesake: Samuel Nicholas
- Builder: Bethlehem Shipbuilding Corporation, Union Iron Works, San Francisco
- Laid down: 11 January 1919
- Launched: 1 May 1919
- Commissioned: 23 November 1920
- Decommissioned: 26 October 1923
- Fate: Wrecked in the Honda Point Disaster, 8 September 1923

General characteristics
- Class & type: Clemson-class destroyer
- Displacement: 1,215 tons
- Length: 314 feet 5 inches (95.83 m)
- Beam: 31 feet 8 inches (9.65 m)
- Draft: 9 feet 3 inches (2.82 m)
- Propulsion: 26,500 shp (20 MW); geared turbines, twin propellers
- Speed: 35 knots (65 km/h)
- Range: 4,900 nmi at 15 kt; (9,100 km at 28 km/h)
- Complement: 122 officers and enlisted
- Armament: 4 × 4 in (100 mm) guns, 1 × 3 in (76 mm) gun, 12 × 21 inch (533 mm) tt.

USS Nicholas (DD-311) was a Clemson-class destroyer in the United States Navy following World War I. She was the first Navy ship named for Samuel Nicholas (1744–1790), the first Commandant of the United States Marine Corps.

== History ==
Nicholas was laid down 11 January 1919 by Bethlehem Shipbuilding Corporation, San Francisco, California; launched 1 May 1919; sponsored by Miss Edith Barry; and commissioned at Mare Island Navy Yard 23 November 1920.

Assigned to Reserve Destroyer Divisions, Pacific Fleet, Nicholas departed Mare Island on 17 December 1920 for San Diego, California, arriving on the 20th and remaining principally in that area with a reduced complement through 1922. The destroyer sailed on 6 February 1923 as part of Destroyer Squadron 11 for combined fleet operations in the Panama Canal Zone. Arriving Balboa twenty days later following exercises en route, the warship engaged in tactical and strategic maneuvers through the end of March and returned to San Diego on 11 April. From 25 June to 31 August, Nicholas and DesRon 11 cruised the coast of Washington, putting in at Tacoma, Port Angeles, and Seattle and serving as escort to President Warren G. Harding in Henderson on his arrival at Seattle on 27 July. She then participated in squadron maneuvers through the end of August with Battleship Division 3, putting in at San Francisco on the 31st.

Nicholas sailed for her homeport at 08:30, 8 September, in company with most of DesRon 11 under Captain Edward H. Watson, with Delphy leading the way. Engaged in a high-speed engineering run down the Pacific Coast, the squadron changed course at 21:00 as inaccurate navigation indicated this was the approach to Santa Barbara Channel. At 21:05, Delphy stranded on the rocks of Point Pedernales, known to sailors as Honda, or the Devil's Jaw; though warning signals were sent up by the flagship, the sheltering configuration of the coast line prevented their recognition by the remaining ships of DesRon 11 and in the ensuing confusion, six other destroyers — including Nicholas — ran aground also. Nicholas’ skipper, Lt. Cmdr. Herbert Roesch, did his utmost to prevent the loss of the destroyer as the heavy seas broke over her and Honda’s rocks pushed into her hull, but the ship was taken by currents and drifted slowly astern, coming to a stop stern-high on a clump of rocks with a 25° list to starboard.

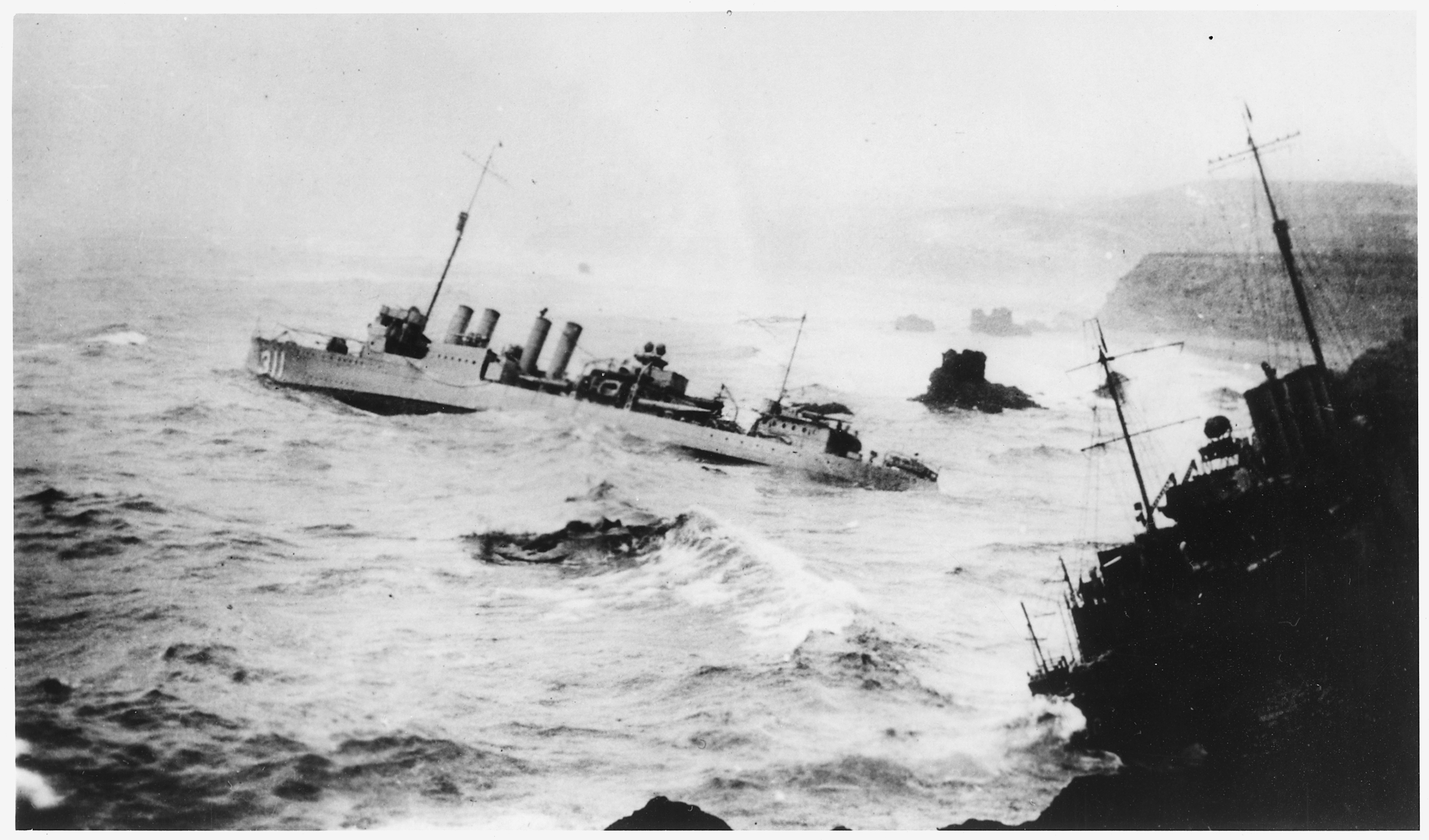
USS Nicholas aground at Honda Point.

Throughout the night, the crew attempted to save Nicholas but in the morning as the waves mounted and Nicholas’ situation became critical, the Captain ordered “Abandon Ship”. The order was accomplished and brought the entire crew ashore safely. Of the seven destroyers' crews, only 23 people died. Considered out of commission on 26 October 1923, Nicholas was struck from the Navy List with her six squadron mates on 20 November. After a number of abortive bids, the destroyer was finally sold on 19 October 1925 to Robert J. Smith of Oakland, California. Though some equipment was salvaged from the wrecked ship, her hull was left to the mercy of the sea in the “graveyard of the Pacific.” The event came to be known as the Honda Point Disaster.
