= USS Young (DD-312) =

Clemson-class destroyer

- USS Young fourth from left

History

United States
- Namesake: John Young
- Builder: Bethlehem Shipbuilding Corporation, Union Iron Works, San Francisco
- Laid down: 11 January 1919
- Launched: 1 May 1919
- Commissioned: 23 November 1920
- Decommissioned: 26 October 1923
- Stricken: 20 November 1923
- Fate: Wrecked in the Honda Point Disaster, 8 September 1923

General characteristics
- Class & type: Clemson-class destroyer
- Displacement: 1,190 tons
- Length: 314 feet 5 inches (95.83 m)
- Beam: 31 feet 8 inches (9.65 m)
- Draft: 9 feet 3 inches (2.82 m)
- Propulsion: 26,500 shp (20 MW); geared turbines, twin propellers
- Speed: 35 knots (65 km/h)
- Range: 4,900 nmi (9,100 km); @ 15-knot (28 km/h)
- Complement: 122 officers and enlisted
- Armament: 4 × 4 in (102 mm)/50 guns, 1 × 3 in (76 mm)/25 gun, 12 × 21 inch (533 mm) torpedo tubes

The first USS Young (DD-312) was a Clemson-class destroyer in the United States Navy following World War I. She was named for John Young.

== History ==
Young was laid down on 28 January 1919 at San Francisco, California, by the Union Iron Works Plant of the Bethlehem Shipbuilding Corporation; launched on 8 May 1919; sponsored by Mrs. John R. Nolan; designated DD-312 on 17 July 1920; and commissioned on 29 November 1920.

Young fitted out at the Mare Island Navy Yard into December. Assigned to Division 34, Squadron 2, Pacific Fleet Destroyer Force, the destroyer remained inactive in the San Diego, California area through the end of 1921.

Young departed San Diego on 14 January 1922, bound for Bremerton, Washington, and, proceeding via San Francisco, California, reached Navy Yard Puget Sound on the 18th. Overhauled at Puget Sound, the destroyer departed the yard on 3 April and arrived at her home port, San Diego, on the 8th. The remainder of the year passed fairly uneventfully, with the destroyer continuing her largely anchored existence in San Diego harbor. However, she did fire short-range battle practices, operated briefly off the Mexican Coronados Islands, and recovered torpedoes for Idaho (BB-42) during the autumn of the year 1922.

The in-port routine changed the following year, when Young departed San Diego on 6 February 1923 and headed for Panama. En route, she stopped briefly at Magdalena Bay, the traditional target practice grounds for the Pacific Fleet, and fueled from Cuyama (AO-3) before proceeding on south to the Pacific side of the Panama Canal Zone.

Young participated in Fleet Problem I over the ensuing weeks. In this, the first Fleet Problem held by the United States Navy, the Battle Fleet was pitted against the Scouting Fleet augmented by a division of battleships. During the war games, Young performed antisubmarine screening for the dreadnoughts of the Battle Fleet and, when the scenario of exercises called for it, dashed in and made simulated torpedo attacks on the "enemy" battlewagons of the augmented Scouting Fleet. Upon completion of one phase of the exercises, she was present in Panama Bay when Secretary of the Navy Edwin C. Denby, accompanied by a party of congressmen embarked in the transport Henderson (AP-1), reviewed the Fleet on 14 March.

Young later departed Panamanian waters on 31 March and arrived back at San Diego on 11 April. She remained there until 25 June, when she headed north. She called at San Francisco from the 27th to the 29th and arrived at Tacoma, Washington, on 2 July. Two days later, in keeping with the occasion, Young sent her landing force ashore to march in Tacoma's Independence Day parade.

After shifting to Seattle, Young underwent a period of upkeep alongside Melville (AD-2) between 16 July and 17 August. During that time, on 23 July, President Warren G. Harding, on a cruise to Alaska in Henderson, reviewed the Fleet - one of his last official acts before his death a short time later.

After spending a few days at Lake Washington following her upkeep period alongside Melville, Young underwent a brief yard period at the Puget Sound Navy Yard before she sailed south, escorting Battle Division 4 to San Francisco Bay at the end of August. En route, Young practiced torpedo attacks through smoke screens as part of the slate of tactical exercises.

Following a brief period moored at Pier 15, San Francisco, Division 11 got underway to return to San Diego on the morning of 8 September. As the ships made passage down the California coast, they conducted tactical and gunnery exercises in the course of what was also a competitive speed run of 20 knots (37 km/h). Ultimately, when the weather worsened, the ships formed column on the squadron leader, Delphy (DD-261). Unfortunately, through an error in navigation, the column swung east at about 2100, unaware of the danger that lurked in the fog dead ahead of them.

At 2105, Delphy - still steaming at 20 knots (37 km/h) - ran hard aground off Padernales Point, followed, in succession, by 6 other ships steaming in follow-the-leader fashion. Only quick action by the ships farthest astern prevented the total loss of the entire group.

Young, however, became one of the casualties. Her hull was torn by a jagged pinnacle, but she also ran into the still revolving propellers of the Delphy (DD-261) which did further damage to her hull. She swiftly capsized, heeling over on her starboard side within a minute and a half, trapping many of her engine and fire room personnel below. Lt. Cmdr. William L. Calhoun, Young's commanding officer, knew that there was no time to launch boats or rafts as the ship's list increased alarmingly following the grounding. Calhoun accordingly passed the word, through his executive officer, Lt. E. C. Herzinger, and Chief Boatswain's Mate Arthur Peterson, to make for the port side, to stick with the ship, and to not jump.

While the survivors clung to their precarious, oily, surf-battered refuge, Boatswain's Mate Peterson proposed to swim 100 yards to a rocky outcropping to the eastward known as Bridge Rock. Before he could do so, however, Chauncey (DD-296) providentially grounded between Young and Bridge Rock, shortening the escape route considerably. The two ships were about 75 yards apart.

At that juncture, Peterson dived into the sea and swam through the tumbling surf with a line to the nearby Chauncey, which was also aground but in a far better predicament since she had remained on a comparatively even keel. The crew of Chauncey hauled Peterson aboard and made the line fast. Soon, a seven-man life raft from the Chauncey was on its way to Young as a makeshift ferry. The raft ultimately made 11 trips bringing the 70 Young survivors to safety. By 2330, the last men of the crew were on board Chauncey; at that point, Lt. Cmdr. Calhoun and Lt. Herzinger (the latter having returned to the ship after having been in the first raft across) left 'Young's' battered hull.

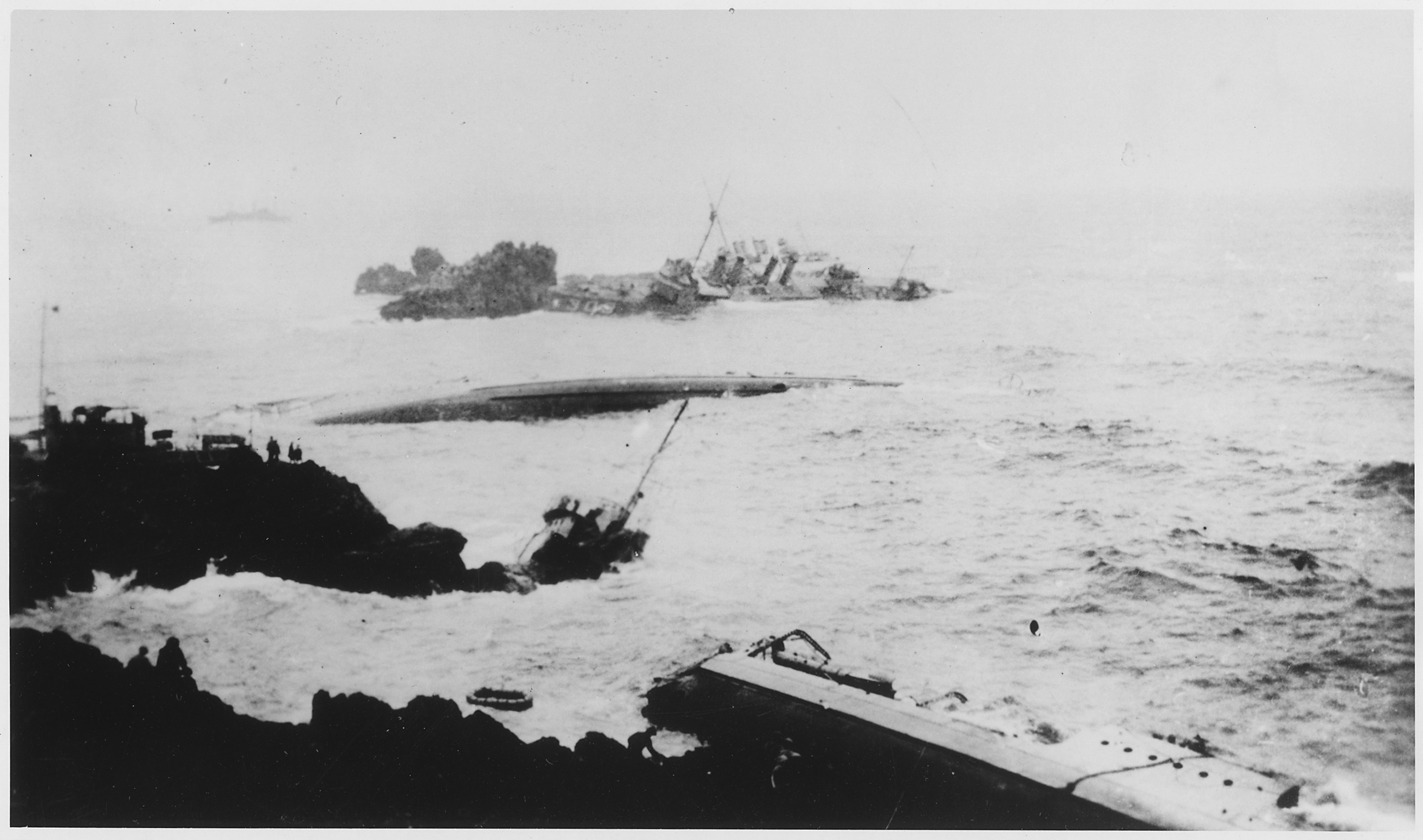
The capsized USS Young (center) at Honda Point.

In the subsequent investigation of the Honda Point Disaster the Board of Investigation commended Lt. Cmdr. Calhoun for his "coolness, intelligence, and seamanlike ability" that was directly responsible for the "greatly reduced loss of life." The Board also cited Boatswain's Mate Peterson for his "extraordinary heroism" in swimming through the turbulent seas with a line to Chauncey; Lt. Herzinger drew praise for his "especially meritorious conduct" in helping to save the majority of the ship's crew.

Rear Admiral S. E. W. Kittelle, Commander, Destroyer Squadrons, subsequently cited Lt. Cmdr. Calhoun's display of leadership and personality that saved "three-quarters of the crew of the Young" and Lt. Herzinger for his "coolness and great assistance in the face of grave danger." Also commended by the admiral was Fireman First Class J. T. Scott, who attempted to close off the master oil valve to prevent a boiler explosion, volunteering to go below to the fireroom and go below the floor plates. The water, rapidly rising through the gashes in the ship's hull, however, prevented Scott from completing the task. He survived.

Twenty men were lost in Young, the highest death toll of any of the ships lost in the disaster at Point Honda.

Decommissioned on 26 October 1923, Young was stricken from the Navy list on 20 November 1923 and ordered sold as a hulk.
