= USS S. P. Lee (DD-310) =

Clemson-class destroyer in the US Navy 1920-23

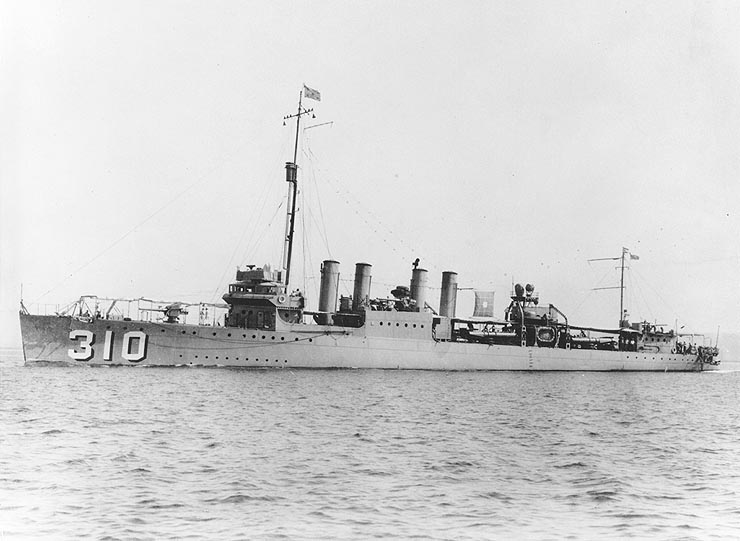
- USS S. P. Lee (DD-310)

History

United States
- Namesake: Samuel Phillips Lee
- Builder: Bethlehem Shipbuilding Corporation, Union Iron Works, San Francisco
- Laid down: 31 December 1918
- Launched: 22 April 1919
- Commissioned: 30 October 1920
- Stricken: 20 November 1923
- Fate: Wrecked in Honda Point Disaster, 8 September 1923

General characteristics
- Class & type: Clemson-class destroyer
- Displacement: 1,308 tons
- Length: 314 feet 4 1/2 inches (95.82 m)
- Beam: 30 feet 11 1/2 inches (9.44 m)
- Draft: 9 feet 9 3/4 inches (2.99 m)
- Propulsion: 26,500 shp (20 MW); geared turbines, twin propellers
- Speed: 35 knots (65 km/h)
- Range: 4,900 nautical miles (9,100 km); @ 15 kt
- Complement: 122 officers and enlisted
- Armament: 4 × 4 in (102 mm)/50 guns, 1 × 3 in (76 mm)/25 gun, 12 × 21 inch (533 mm) torpedo tubes

The first USS S. P. Lee (DD-310) was a Clemson-class destroyer in the United States Navy following World War I. She was named for Samuel Phillips Lee.

== History ==
S. P. Lee was laid down on 31 December 1918 by the Bethlehem Shipbuilding Corporation, San Francisco, California; launched by Mrs. Thomas J. Wyche; and commissioned on 30 October 1920.

Assigned to Reserve Destroyer Division, Pacific Fleet, S. P. Lee spent most of her first two years in the San Diego, California area with a reduced complement. She sailed on 6 February 1923 as part of Destroyer Squadron 11 for combined fleet operations in the Panama Canal Zone. Arriving Balboa 20 days later following exercises en route, the destroyer engaged in tactical and strategic maneuvers through the end of March and returned to San Diego on 11 April. From 25 June to 30 August, S. P. Lee and DesRon 11 cruised the coast of Washington, putting in at Tacoma, Port Angeles, and Seattle and serving as escort to President Warren G. Harding in Henderson on his arrival at Seattle on 27 July. She then participated in squadron maneuvers through the end of August with Battleship Division 3, putting in at San Francisco on the 31st.

S. P. Lee sailed for her homeport at 0830, 8 September, in company with most of DesRon 11 under Captain E. H. Watson in Delphy leading the way. Engaged in a high-speed engineering run down the Pacific Coast, the squadron changed course to 95° at 2100 as inaccurate navigation indicated it appropriate to make the approach to Santa Barbara Channel. At 2105, Delphy stranded on the rocks of Point Pedernales, known to sailors as Honda, or the Devil's Jaw; though warning signals were sent up by the flagship, the sheltering configuration of the coast line prevented their recognition by the remaining ships of DesRon 11; and, in the ensuing confusion, six other destroyers including S. P. Lee ran aground also in what is known as the Honda Point Disaster.

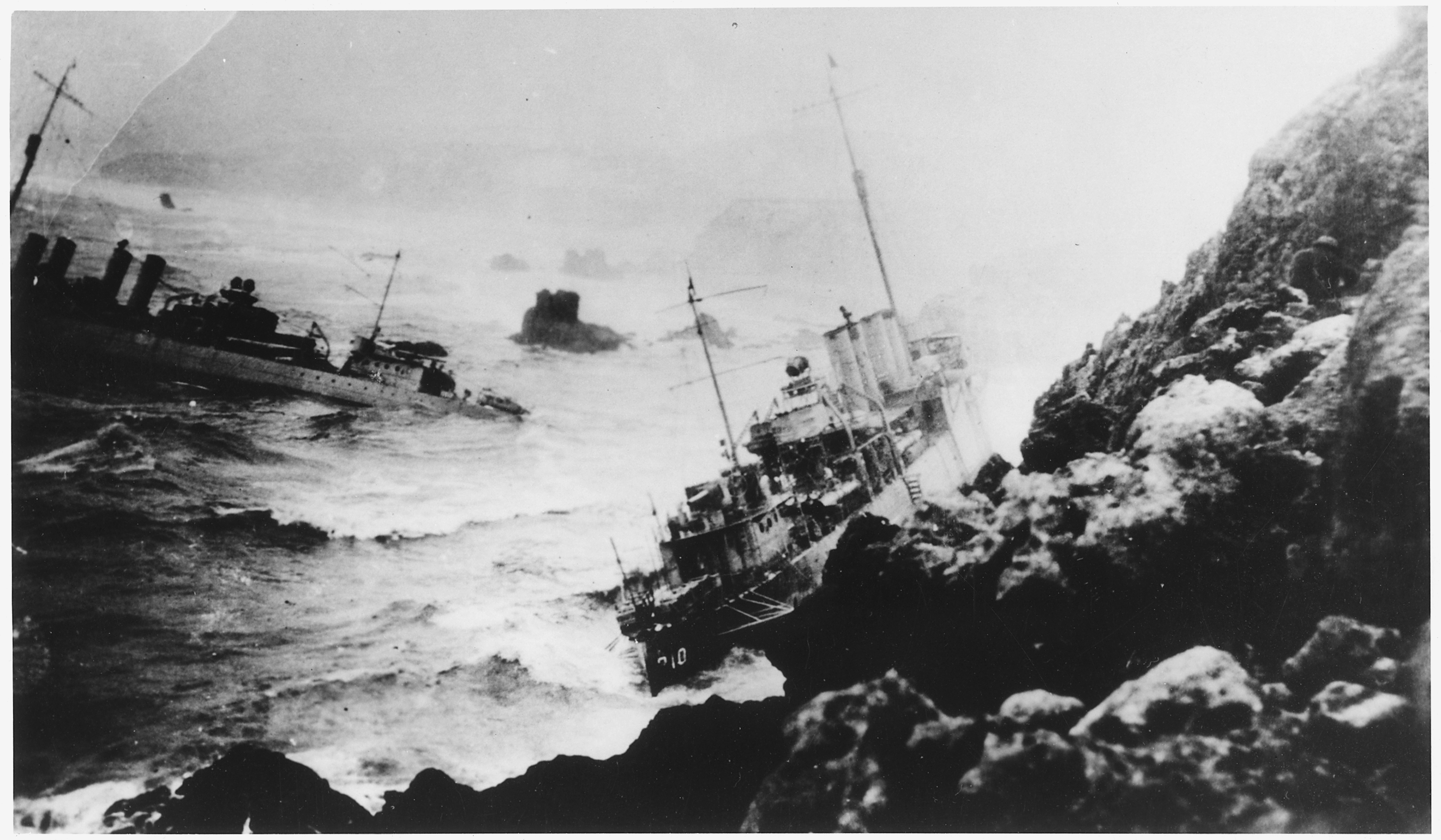
USS S. P. Lee (right) aground at Honda Point.

Valiant efforts by the crew to save the ship proved futile, and the ship was abandoned the following day and declared a total loss. S. P. Lee and her sister destroyers were struck from the Navy list on 20 November. Her wreckage was sold on 19 October 1925 to Robert J. Smith of Oakland, California. He removed some of the destroyer's equipment but was unable to salvage her.
