= Edward H. Watson =

United States Navy officer (1874–1942)

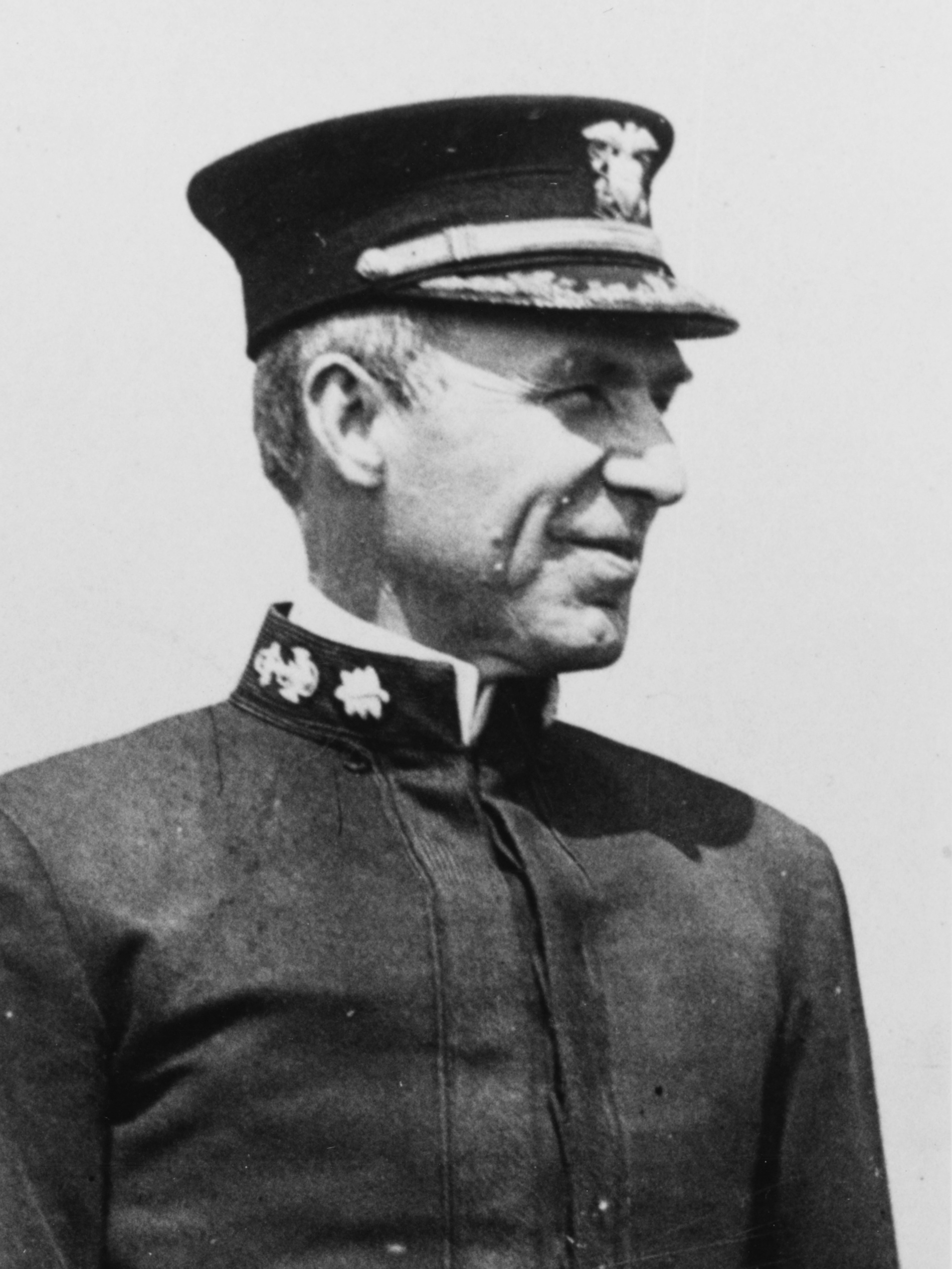
- Born: February 28, 1874; Frankfort, Kentucky, U.S.
- Died: January 7, 1942 (aged 67) Brooklyn, New York, U.S.
- Allegiance: United States
- Branch: USN
- Service years: 1895–1929
- Rank: Captain
- Commands: USS Celtic; USS Wheeling; USS Madawaska; USS Alabama; Destroyer Squadron 11
- Conflicts: Spanish–American War; World War I
- Awards: Navy Cross
- Education: Naval War College
- Spouse: Hermine Cary Gratz

Edward Howe Watson (February 28, 1874 – January 7, 1942) was a career United States Navy officer, who led a squadron of destroyers aground off Point Honda on the California coast in 1923.

== Early life and marriage ==
Watson was born in Frankfort, Kentucky, a son of U.S. Navy Commander John Crittenden Watson. He married Hermine Cary Gratz, whose half-sister, Helen Gratz, married Godfrey S. Rockefeller of Greenwich, Connecticut.

== Navy career ==
=== Academy and early career ===
Watson graduated from the U.S. Naval Academy in June 1895 and served on several ships during the rest of the decade, including Spanish–American War service on board the cruiser USS Detroit. He attended the Naval War College in 1908. Watson commanded the storeship USS Celtic in 1912–13, then returned to the Naval War College to attend the long course, graduating in 1914. He also saw duty as executive officer of the battleship USS Utah and as Commanding Officer of the gunboat USS Wheeling.

=== World War I ===
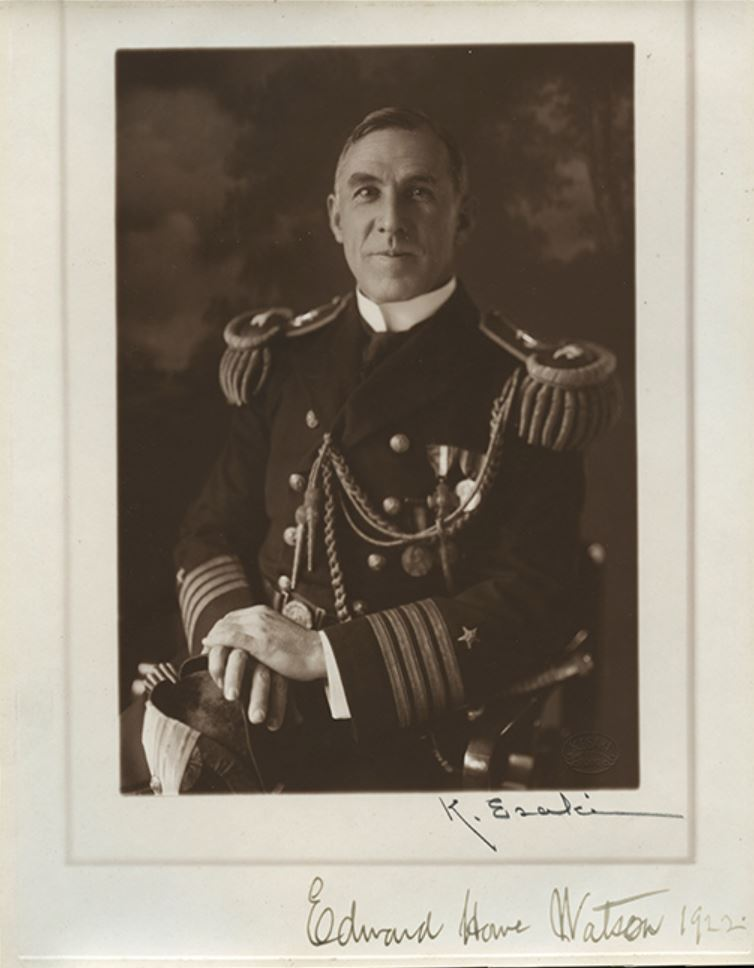
Captain Edward H Watson 1922

During World War I, he commanded the troop transport USS Madawaska from August 1917 to January 1918. CAPT Watson was then in command of the battleship USS Alabama, receiving the Navy Cross "for exceptionally meritorious service in a duty of great responsibility as Commanding Officer of the U.S.S. Alabama in the Atlantic Fleet". In March 1919, he became U.S. Naval Attaché in Japan, remaining in that post until May 1922. In July of that year, he took command of Destroyer Squadron 11, based on the West Coast.

=== Honda Point disaster ===
On September 8, 1923, dead reckoning navigation errors on Watson's flagship led seven of his squadron's destroyers to ground on the rocky coast at Honda Point, California, a loss that came to be known as the Honda Point Disaster. Watson was convicted at court martial for his role.

Not all observers agreed with the Navy's decision to punish Watson. In 1960, the authors of Tragedy at Honda argued that the causes of the tragedy lay in the failure of new technology from a navigational radio station to supply necessary data to ships operating in dense fog, but that Watson displayed outstanding honor and leadership by taking full responsibility, quoting at length the editors of the Army and Navy Journal, who wrote at the time of the court martial:

Captain Watson has given a splendid example of the finest attributes of character overcoming the elemental instinct of self-preservation. Voluntarily waiving the fundamental right of a defendant to place the burden of proof upon the prosecution, and to refrain from testifying under oath to any facts that might tend to incriminate himself, he took the witness stand and not only freely testified to facts relating to his own culpability but also volunteered his opinion under oath that he was wholly responsible for the disaster, and that none of his subordinates should be blamed.

=== Post-Honda Point career and retirement ===
After the Honda Point disaster, Captain Watson served as Assistant Commandant of the Fourteenth Naval District in Hawaii until he left active duty in November 1929.

He retired to New York City, where he was in the New York Social Register. He and his family spent their summers on Walcott Avenue in Jamestown, Rhode Island, where he was a member of the Conanicut Yacht Club.

== Death ==
Watson died in 1942 at the Brooklyn Naval Hospital in Brooklyn, New York. He was interred at Arlington National Cemetery.
