= USS Chauncey (DD-296) =

Clemson-class destroyer

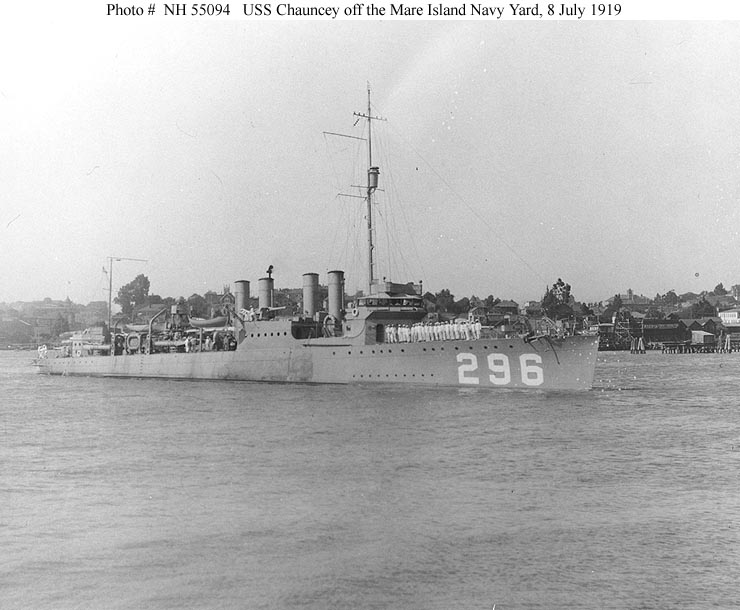
- USS Chauncey (Destroyer # 296) Off the Mare Island Navy Yard, 8 July 1919.

History

United States
- Name: USS Chauncey
- Namesake: Isaac Chauncey
- Builder: Bethlehem Shipbuilding Corporation, Union Iron Works, San Francisco
- Laid down: 17 June 1918
- Launched: 29 September 1918
- Commissioned: 25 June 1919
- Decommissioned: 26 October 1923
- Stricken: 25 September 1925
- Fate: Wrecked in the Honda Point Disaster, 8 September 1923

General characteristics
- Class & type: Clemson-class destroyer
- Displacement: 1,290 long tons (1,311 t) (standard); 1,389 long tons (1,411 t) (deep load)
- Length: 314 ft 4 in (95.8 m)
- Beam: 30 ft 11 in (9.42 m)
- Draught: 10 ft 3 in (3.1 m)
- Installed power: 27,000 shp (20,000 kW); 4 water-tube boilers
- Propulsion: 2 shafts, 2 steam turbines
- Speed: 35 knots (65 km/h; 40 mph) (design)
- Range: 2,500 nautical miles (4,600 km; 2,900 mi) at 20 knots (37 km/h; 23 mph) (design)
- Complement: 6 officers, 108 enlisted men
- Armament: 4 × single 4-inch (102 mm) guns; 2 × single 1-pounder AA guns or; 2 × single 3-inch (76 mm) guns; 4 × triple 21 inch (533 mm) torpedo tubes; 2 × depth charge rails

USS Chauncey (DD-296) was a Clemson-class destroyer (ship) built for the United States Navy during World War I.

== Description ==
The Clemson class was a repeat of the preceding Wickes class although more fuel capacity was added. The ships displaced 1,290 long tons (1,311 t) at standard load and 1,389 long tons (1,411 t) at deep load. They had an overall length of 314 feet 4 inches (95.8 m), a beam of 30 feet 11 inches (9.4 m) and a draught of 10 feet 3 inches (3.1 m). They had a crew of 6 officers and 108 enlisted men.

Performance differed radically between the ships of the class, often due to poor workmanship. The Clemson class was powered by two steam turbines, each driving one propeller shaft, using steam provided by four water-tube boilers. The turbines were designed to produce a total of 27,000 shaft horsepower (20,000 kW) intended to reach a speed of 35 knots (65 km/h; 40 mph). The ships carried a maximum of 371 long tons (377 t) of fuel oil which was intended gave them a range of 2,500 nautical miles (4,600 km; 2,900 mi) at 20 knots (37 km/h; 23 mph).

The ships were armed with four 4-inch (102 mm) guns in single mounts and were fitted with two 1-pounder guns for anti-aircraft defense. In many ships a shortage of 1-pounders caused them to be replaced by 3-inch (76 mm) guns. Their primary weapon, though, was their torpedo battery of a dozen 21 inch (533 mm) torpedo tubes in four triple mounts. They also carried a pair of depth charge rails. A "Y-gun" depth charge thrower was added to many ships.

== Construction and career ==
Chauncey named for Isaac Chauncey, was launched 29 September 1918 by Union Iron Works, San Francisco, California; sponsored by Miss D. M. Todd; commissioned 25 June 1919 and reported to the Pacific Fleet. From the time of her commissioning, Chauncey sailed from San Diego and Mare Island to Hawaii and along the Pacific coast taking part in fleet exercises, gunnery practice, and other training activities. From 15 July 1920 to 14 October 1921, she was in ready reserve at San Diego and Mare Island, then returned to active duty as flagship of Destroyer Division 31.

On the evening of 8 September 1923, Chauncey in company with a large group of destroyers was sailing through a heavy fog from San Francisco to San Diego, when a navigational error on board the first ship in her column turned that destroyer and the six that followed toward the rocky California coast rather than on a reach down Santa Barbara Channel. All seven destroyers, including Chauncey, went aground on the jagged rocks off Point Pedernales, in what was called the Honda Point Disaster.

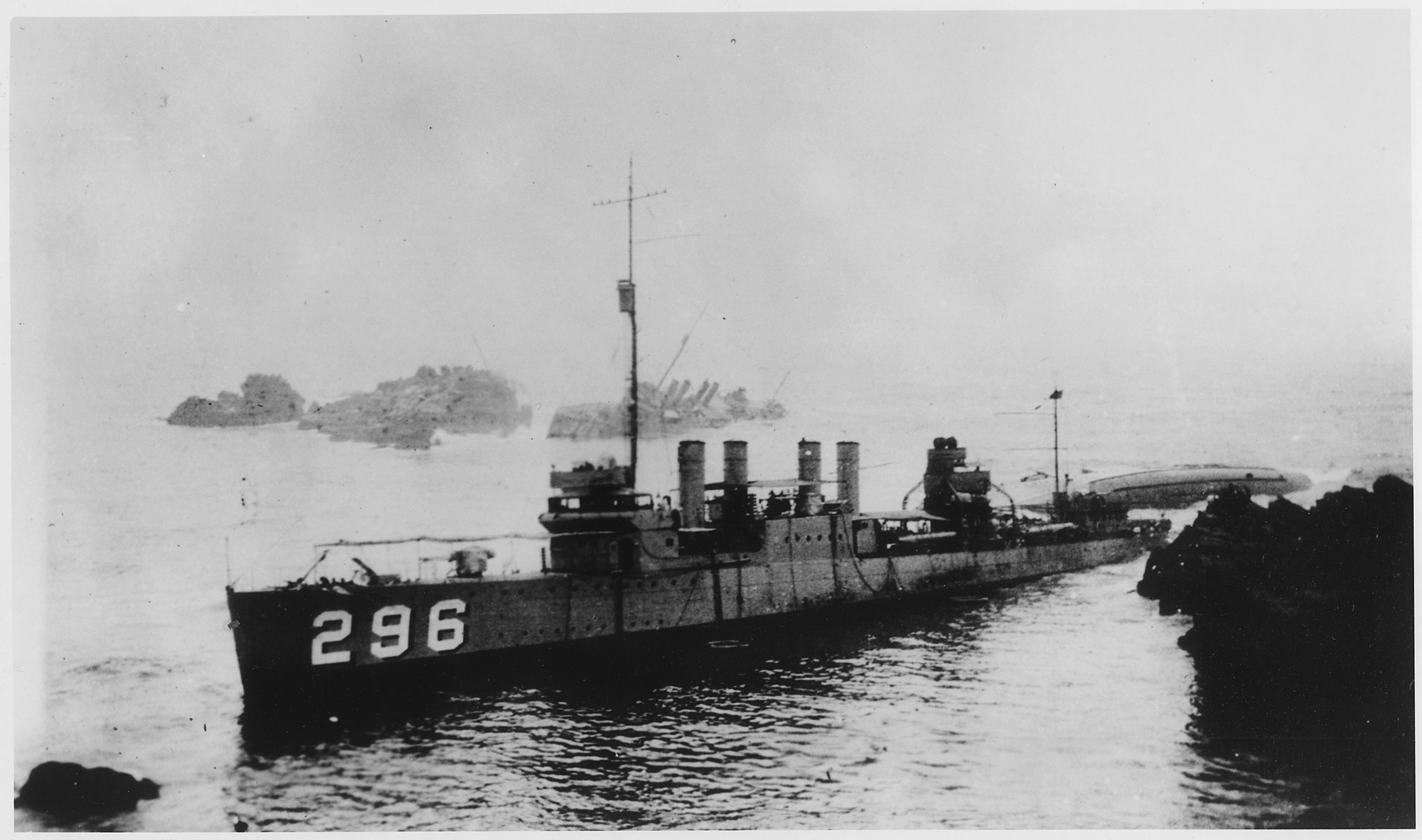
USS Chauncey aground at Honda Point.

Chauncey stranded upright, high on the rocks, near USS Young (DD-312), which had capsized. With none of her men lost, Chauncey at once went to the aid of Young, passing a line by which 70 of Young's crew clambered hand-over-hand to Chauncey. Swimmers from Chauncey then rigged a network of lifelines to the coastal cliffs, and both her men and Young's reached safety by this means. The abandoned Chauncey was wrecked by the surf, and was decommissioned 26 October 1923. All the hulks were sold for salvage and removal as of 25 September 1925.
