= USS Kennedy (DD-306) =

Clemson-class destroyer

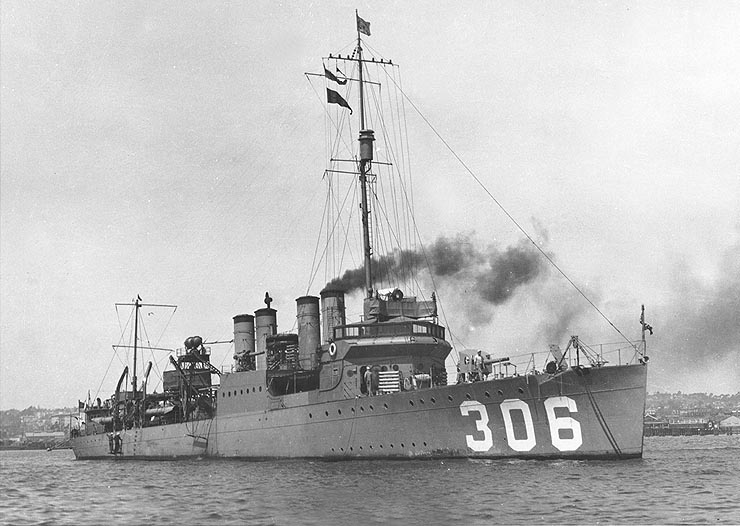
- USS Kennedy (DD-306)

History

United States
- Namesake: John P. Kennedy
- Builder: Bethlehem Shipbuilding Corporation, Union Iron Works, San Francisco
- Laid down: 25 September 1918
- Launched: 18 January 1919
- Commissioned: 5 August 1920
- Decommissioned: 20 February 1930
- Stricken: 18 November 1930
- Fate: Sold for scrapping, 23 April 1932

General characteristics
- Class & type: Clemson-class destroyer
- Displacement: 1,290 long tons (1,311 t) (standard); 1,389 long tons (1,411 t) (deep load)
- Length: 314 ft 4 in (95.8 m)
- Beam: 30 ft 11 in (9.42 m)
- Draught: 10 ft 3 in (3.1 m)
- Installed power: 27,000 shp (20,000 kW); 4 water-tube boilers
- Propulsion: 2 shafts, 2 steam turbines
- Speed: 35 knots (65 km/h; 40 mph) (design)
- Range: 2,500 nautical miles (4,600 km; 2,900 mi) at 20 knots (37 km/h; 23 mph) (design)
- Complement: 6 officers, 108 enlisted men
- Armament: 4 × single 4-inch (102 mm) guns; 2 × single 1-pounder AA guns or; 2 × single 3-inch (76 mm) guns; 4 × triple 21 inch (533 mm) torpedo tubes; 2 × depth charge rails

USS Kennedy (DD-306) was a Clemson-class destroyer built for the United States Navy during World War I.

== Description ==
The Clemson class was a repeat of the preceding Wickes class although more fuel capacity was added. The ships displaced 1,290 long tons (1,311 t) at standard load and 1,389 long tons (1,411 t) at deep load. They had an overall length of 314 feet 4 inches (95.8 m), a beam of 30 feet 11 inches (9.4 m) and a draught of 10 feet 3 inches (3.1 m). They had a crew of 6 officers and 108 enlisted men.

Performance differed radically between the ships of the class, often due to poor workmanship. The Clemson class was powered by two steam turbines, each driving one propeller shaft, using steam provided by four water-tube boilers. The turbines were designed to produce a total of 27,000 shaft horsepower (20,000 kW) intended to reach a speed of 35 knots (65 km/h; 40 mph). The ships carried a maximum of 371 long tons (377 t) of fuel oil which was intended gave them a range of 2,500 nautical miles (4,600 km; 2,900 mi) at 20 knots (37 km/h; 23 mph).

The ships were armed with four 4-inch (102 mm) guns in single mounts and were fitted with two 1-pounder guns for anti-aircraft defense. In many ships a shortage of 1-pounders caused them to be replaced by 3-inch (76 mm) guns. Their primary weapon, though, was their torpedo battery of a dozen 21 inch (533 mm) torpedo tubes in four triple mounts. They also carried a pair of depth charge rails. A "Y-gun" depth charge thrower was added to many ships.

== Construction and career ==
Kennedy, named for the 21st Secretary of the Navy and US Representative from Maryland, John P. Kennedy, was launched 15 February 1919 by Bethlehem Shipbuilding Corporation, San Francisco, California; sponsored by Mrs. Eugene F. Essner; and commissioned 16 August 1920. Kennedy arrived in San Diego, California, her homeport, 7 October 1920 and joined the Pacific Fleet in exercises and maneuvers along the West Coast from the Pacific Northwest to South America. Gunnery drills, torpedo practice, plane-guard duty, fleet problems, and war maneuvers with the Army kept Kennedy busy at sea.

During the spring of 1924, the destroyer transited the Panama Canal for fleet concentrations in the Caribbean. She returned San Diego 22 April to resume operations of her homeport. She sailed 13 June 1925 for a fleet problem and joint exercises off Hawaii. During this cruise she accompanied the Battle Fleet to Pago Pago, Samoa, and ports in Australia and New Zealand, returning San Diego 26 September. In 1927 she revisited the Caribbean for more exercises, this time calling at Norfolk, Virginia and New York before returning San Diego 22 May. Kennedy sailed once again 9 April 1928 for large scale maneuvers in Hawaiian waters, resuming operations out of San Diego 2 months later. After training cruises for reserves during the summer of 1929, Kennedy arrived in San Diego 27 September and decommissioned there 1 May 1930. Her hulk was sold 19 March 1931 and scrapped in accordance with the terms of the London Treaty limiting naval armament.
