= USS Delphy =

Clemson-class destroyer

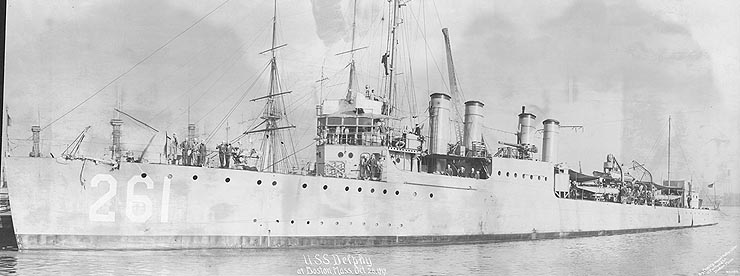
- USS Delphy at Boston Navy Yard on 28 October 1919

History

United States
- Name: Delphy
- Namesake: Richard Delphy
- Builder: Bethlehem Shipbuilding Corporation, Squantum Victory Yard
- Laid down: 20 April 1918
- Launched: 18 July 1918
- Commissioned: 30 November 1918
- Decommissioned: 26 October 1923
- Fate: Wrecked 8 September 1923 in the Honda Point disaster; Sold for scrap 19 October 1925

General characteristics
- Class & type: Clemson-class destroyer
- Displacement: 1,190 tons
- Length: 314 ft 5 in (95.8 m)
- Beam: 31 ft 8 in (9.7 m)
- Draft: 9 ft 3 in (2.8 m)
- Propulsion: 26,500 shp (19,800 kW); geared turbines, twin propellers
- Speed: 35 knots (65 km/h; 40 mph)
- Range: 4,900 nmi (9,100 km; 5,600 mi) at 15 knots (28 km/h; 17 mph)
- Complement: 120 officers and enlisted
- Armament: 4 × 4 in (102 mm)/50 guns; 1 × 3 in (76 mm)/25 guns; 12 × 21 in (533 mm) torpedo tubes

USS Delphy (DD-261) was a Clemson-class destroyer in the United States Navy following World War I. It was the flagship of the destroyer group involved in the Honda Point disaster.

== Namesake ==
Richard Delphy was born c. 1795. He was appointed Midshipman on 18 May 1809 and served during the engagement with HMS Macedonian on 25 October 1812. He was killed in the action in which USS Argus lost to HMS Pelican on 14 August 1813.

== History ==
Delphy was launched on 18 July 1918 by Bethlehem Shipbuilding Corporation, Squantum, Massachusetts; sponsored by Mrs. W. S. Sims, wife of Rear Admiral William Sims; and commissioned on 30 November 1918.

Before joining the Atlantic Fleet Delphy tested submarine detection devices at New London, Connecticut, from 23 to 31 December 1918 and aided survivors from Northern Pacific, stranded off Fire Island, New York, on New Year's Day, 1919. Delphy sailed from New York on 13 January for winter maneuvers and torpedo practice in the Caribbean Sea. Returning to New York on 14 April with the Fleet, she sailed for Boston, Massachusetts, on the last day of the month for operations in preparation for the first transatlantic seaplane flight.

Delphy sailed 19 November 1919 from Boston for the west coast, arriving at San Diego, California, on 22 December. She joined Destroyer Squadrons, Pacific Fleet, at San Diego for torpedo practice and recovery until placed in reserve on 12 June. Delphy lay at San Diego until 27 December when she sailed with the other ships of Reserve Destroyer Division for Bremerton, Washington, arriving on 4 January 1921 for an extended overhaul at Navy Yard Puget Sound.

== Honda Point ==
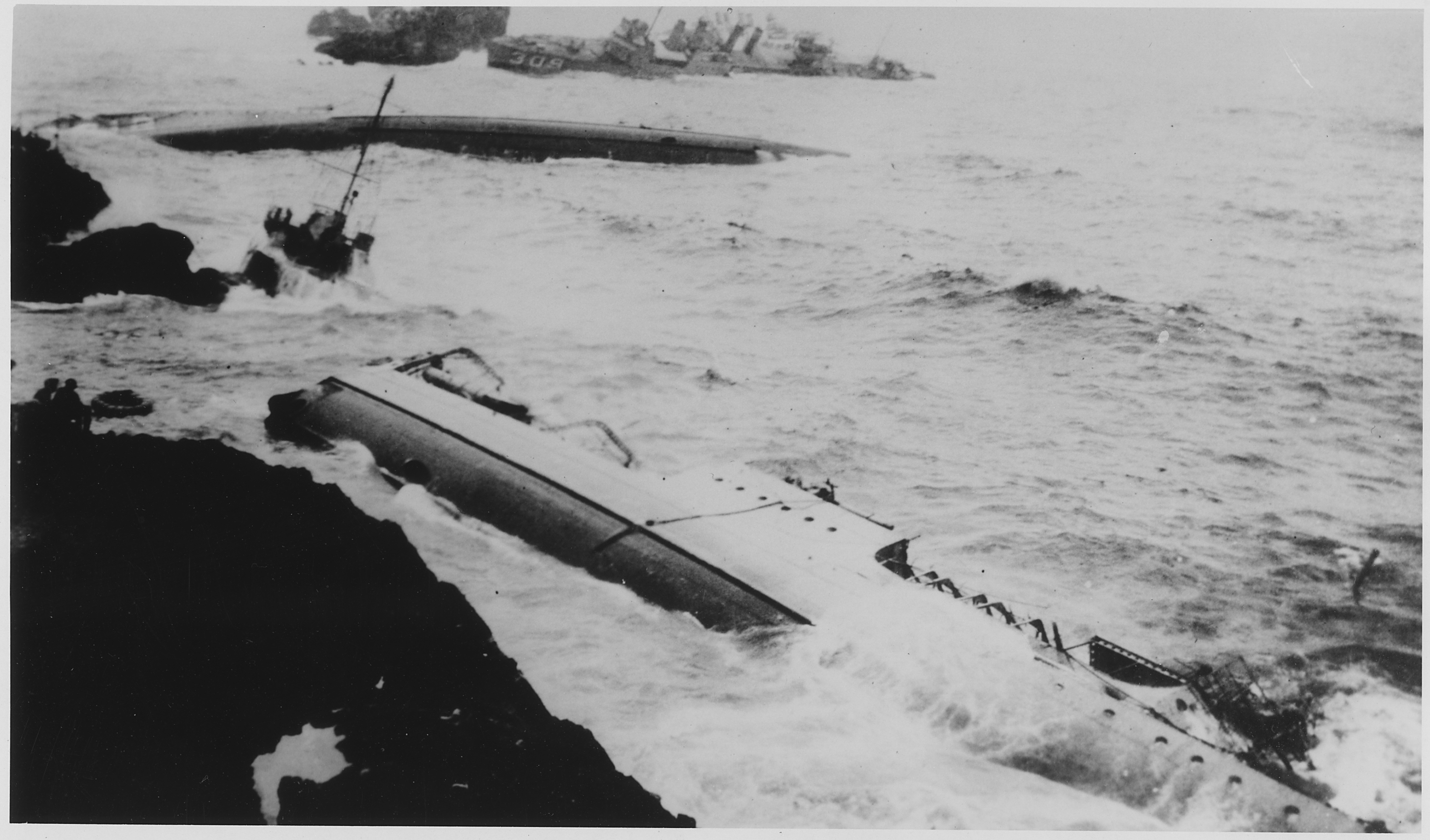
USS Delphy (foreground) broken in half at Honda Point

Between 22 July 1921 and 20 March 1922 Delphy operated from San Diego with 50 percent of her complement, and then was overhauled. She cruised with the Battle Fleet for exercises off Balboa from 6 February to 11 April 1923, and then carried out experiments with torpedoes off San Diego. On 25 June she got underway with Destroyer Division 31 for a cruise to Washington for summer maneuvers with the Battle Fleet on the return passage.

Delphy, under the command of Lieutenant Commander Donald T. Hunter, was the leading destroyer of seven which were stranded on the rocks of the California coast in dense fog on 8 September 1923. This event became known as the Honda Point disaster. Delphy crashed broadside and broke in half, her stern below the surface. Three of her crew died and 15 were injured.

She was decommissioned as of 26 October 1923, and sold as a wreck 19 October 1925.

As of 2007, no other US Navy ships have been named Delphy.
