= Allen B. Reed =

US Navy officer (1884–1965)

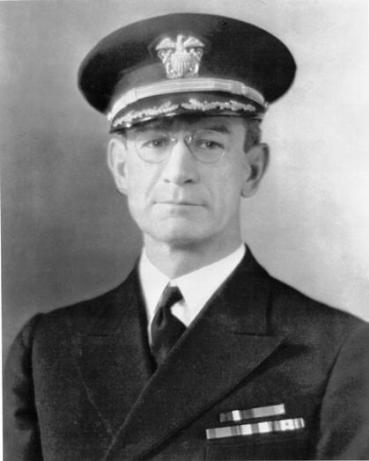
- Capt. Allen B. Reed, Sr.
- Born: April 3, 1884; Liberty, Missouri, US
- Died: February 28, 1965 (aged 80); Bethesda, Maryland, US
- Burial place: Arlington National Cemetery
- Military career
- Allegiance: United States of America
- Branch: United States Navy
- Service years: 1904–1941 (37 Years)
- Rank: Captain
- Commands: USS Paragua; USS Iris; USS Susquehanna; USS Florida; USS Worden; USS Converse; Division 80 of Destroyer Squadron 11; Division 30 of Battle Fleet from USS McCawley; Division 45 of Battle Fleet from USS Preble; USS New Orleans
- Conflicts: Philippines- Moro Rebellion; First Nicaraguan Campaign; Mexican Revolution; World War I
- Awards: Navy Cross

Captain Allen Bevins Reed (April 3, 1884 – February 28, 1965) was a U.S. Naval officer whose career began aboard vessels in the Asiatic and Pacific Fleets. Early in his career he was Captain Takeshita Isamu's escort during a ceremonial visit to the mayor of San Francisco, and he was a member of a Naval Board of Inquiry. Reed assumed the command of a landing force of 120 men in Nicaragua in 1912, to protect a railway line following a coup d'état attempt by General Luis Mena.

Over his career, Reed commanded eight ships, and after he was made captain, he was commander of Division 80 of Destroyer Squadron 11, Division 30 of Battle Fleet from the flagship USS McCawley, and Division 45 of the Battle Fleet from USS Preble. Reed received the Navy Cross for his command of the USS Susquehanna during dangerous transatlantic voyages of World War I. Reed was the plank owner commanding officer of the newly commissioned heavy cruiser USS New Orleans, and in the summer of 1934, President Franklin D. Roosevelt took a cruise on the ship through the Panama Canal and the Pacific Ocean.

In the latter years of his naval career, Reed was attached to the office of the Chief of Naval Operations where his assignments included Director of Fleet Maintenance Division. He was Chairman of the Executive Committee of the Army and Navy Munitions Board and served on the Joint Economy Board between the Army and Navy.

He retired in 1939, but remain on active duty at the beginning of World War II. He was head of the United States Maritime Commission and was the navy liaison to the Office of Production Management, which later became the War Production Board.

== Naval Academy ==
Reed entered the United States Naval Academy (USNA) on September 22, 1900, as one of 93 fourth class naval cadets. On July 1, 1902, the Academy changed the title of "naval cadet" to "midshipman". He was on the track, gymnastics and football teams there. Reed's fellow graduates of the class of 1904 included future Admiral William S. "Bull" Halsey, Jr. Completing his academic studies, Reed received his warrant as a passed midshipman. On January 25, 1904, he was detached from Annapolis "to home and ready for sea".

== Naval service ==
=== Early career ===
On March 21, 1904, Reed reported for duty aboard the school ship USS Mohican and was then on several vessels of the Asiatic and Pacific Fleets for more than four years. During that time he was commissioned an ensign, (Note: He was a passed midshipman in 1905 on the gunboat, USS Paragua of the Asiatic Fleet. Ensign Reed was on the protected cruiser USS Baltimore, cruising Asiatic, Philippine and Australian waters through April 1907. By mid-June 1907, Reed was assigned to the protected cruiser USS Charleston of the Pacific Fleet Second Squadron Third Division.) which then required successful completion of two years sea duty. Reed was a lieutenant and senior engineer on the USS Albany by October 13, 1909, when he was Imperial Japanese Navy Captain Takeshita Isamu's escort during a ceremonial visit to the mayor of San Francisco. (Note: Takeshita Isamu was commander of the Idzumo. The ceremonial visit occurred in concert with The Portola Festival on October 19, 1909, that was attended by captains of warships from Holland, Japan, the United Kingdom, Germany, and Italy.)

He was stationed at the Mare Island Naval Shipyard in 1910, and in April 1911 Reed became a member of the Naval Board of Inquiry that convened to investigate fraud involving naval Paymaster Arthur M. Pippin and two others. The men were court-martialed and sentenced to hard labor at San Quentin State Prison.

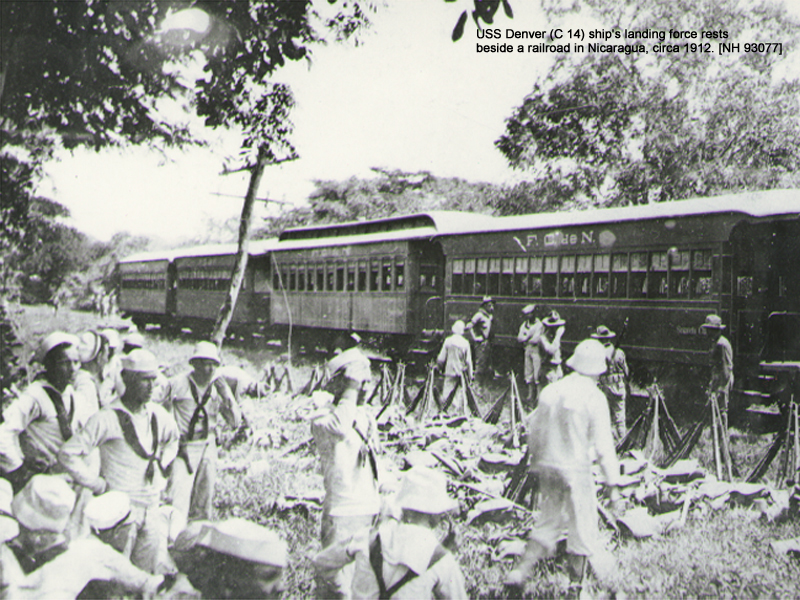
USS Denver ship's landing force under Lt. A. B. Reed rests beside the Corinto, Nicaragua railroad line, 1912

Reed was an executive officer on USS Denver (Note: He was assigned to the protected cruiser, USS Denver, by June 26, 1912, and he became a navigator of the vessel that year.) when he was given command of a landing force of 120 men who landed at Corinto, Nicaragua on August 29, 1912. This followed a coup d'état attempt by General Luis Mena, Minister of War to overthrow President Adolfo Díaz and the Denver was one of six ships brought in to provide troops to protect the railway line from Corinto to Managua. (Note: This landing party reembarked aboard ship October 24 and 25, 1912. Officers and enlisted men who participated in the landing at Nicaragua between July 29, 1912, and November 14, 1912, including those on USS Denver, received the Nicaraguan Campaign Medal.)

=== Mexico and Panama Canal ===
By May 26, 1913, Reed was next on the Torpedo Flotilla tender USS Iris, as executive officer and navigator, and he came to command it into June 1915. Iris along with five torpedo boats from the Pacific Fleet Torpedo Flotilla, were ordered to the Gulf of California, also known as the Sea of Cortez following the Tampico Affair by May 4, 1914. They patrolled the vicinity of La Paz and Mazatlán, Mexico, during the ongoing civil unrest there. During May and June 1914, Iris evacuated American citizen refugees from Mazatlan and Acapulco, including the American consul, Hon. Clement S. Edwards.

He was made Captain of the Port at Balboa, Panama by June 11, 1915. (Note: He replaced Commander Henry V. Butler and remained Captain of the Port at least through 1916.)

=== World War I ===
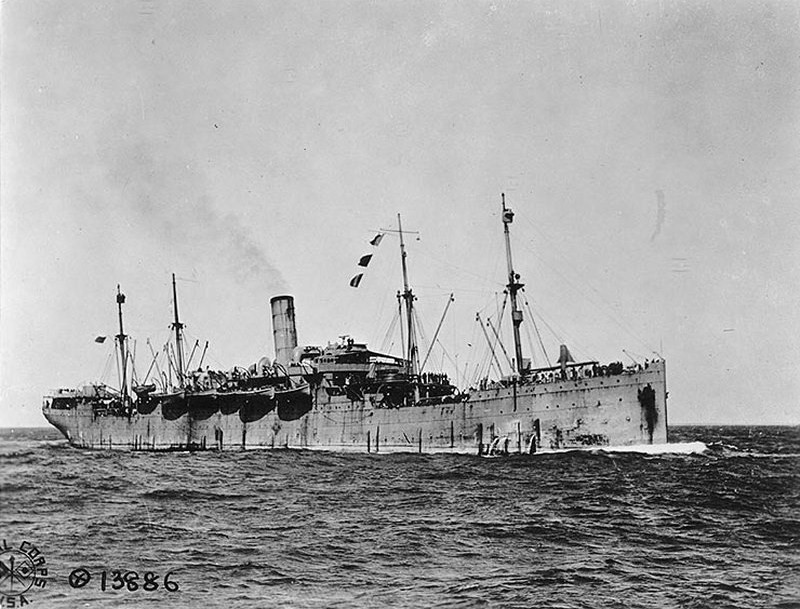
USS Susquehanna

About December 26, 1917, President Wilson approved an Act of Congress that temporarily promoted a total of 188 officers to rear admirals, captains, and commanders. Reed was one of the group of men temporarily promoted to commander during World War I. He was awarded the Navy Cross in 1920 "for distinguished service in the line of his profession as commanding officer of the USS Susquehanna, engaged in the important, exacting and hazardous duty of transporting and escorting troops and supplies to European ports through waters infested with enemy submarines and mines."

=== Between the two world wars ===
Reed was Commander of the battleship USS Florida from March 1923 to May 1924, He was commander of the Clemson-class destroyer USS Worden by July, and by November, he was commanding the USS Converse.

By July 1925, Reed was at the Naval War College in Newport, Rhode Island, in the Senior Class of 1926. After World War I, the college was led by Admiral William S. Sims, who promoted innovative thinking. Sims was commander of the Naval Forces in Europe during the war.

He was assigned to the Ships' Movement Division of the office of the Chief of Naval Operations in Washington, D.C., by July 1926 and was there through at least January 1, 1928. During that time, Reed was promoted to captain on March 16, 1927. In August 1928, he commanded Division 80 of Destroyer Squadron 11, reporting to Lewis B. Porterfield. By April 1929, he was commander of Division 30 of Battle Fleet from the flagship USS McCawley (DD-276). In January 1930, he was commander of Division 45 of Battle Fleet from the flagship USS Preble. He was then at the Material Division of the office of the Chief of Naval Operations from 1930 to 1932.

Reed assumed command of a new cruiser, USS New Orleans, at New York Navy Yard in February 1934. Among New Orlean's junior officers under Captain Reed's command in 1934 were Ensign E.L. Jahncke, Jr. and Ensign T.H. Moorer. Jahncke was the son of the Assistant Secretary of the Navy, and Moorer rose to the rank of admiral and served as Chief of Naval Operations (CNO) from 1967 to 1970 and Chairman of the Joint Chiefs of Staff from 1970 to 1974.

USS New Orleans made a shakedown Transatlantic crossing to Northern Europe and Scandinavia in May and June 1934. President Franklin D. Roosevelt took a cruise beginning July 5 on the ship, which went through the Panama Canal, had an exercise off of the California coast with USS Macon, and ended at Astoria, Oregon, on August 2, 1934. The New Orleans then went through the Panama Canal to Cuba, and then exercised off of the New England coast. It made its first visit to the port of New Orleans in the spring of 1935. On March 30, 1935, Louisiana Governor Oscar K. Allen presented Reed and the ship with the silver services from the former battleship USS Louisiana and the former cruiser USS New Orleans, and named Reed an honorary citizen of the city. (Note: Reed's home town of Liberty, Missouri, named March 30, 1935 "Captain Reed Day" in his honor.) It was still under his command in April 1935.

He was Director of Fleet Maintenance Division of the Office of the Chief of Naval Operations from October 1935 to 1939. (Note: He was Director of Fleet Maintenance Division of the Office of the Chief of Naval Operations through the intervening years of 1936, 1937, and 1938.) In 1937, Reed also served on the Joint Economy Board between the Army and Navy and was the appointed Chairman of the Executive Committee of the Army and Navy Munitions Board.

=== World War II ===
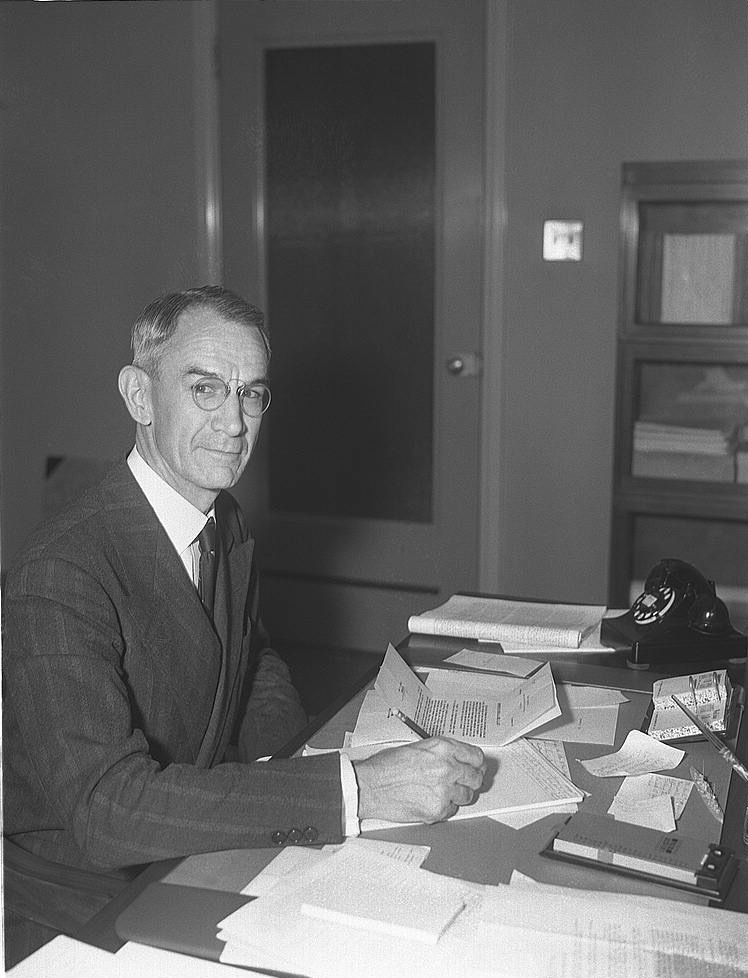
Captain A.B. Reed, U.S. Navy Ret., liaison officer, Navy, and Office of Production Management, circa 1940

He retired by October 1, 1939, but he remained on active duty during the initial years of World War II. He was head of the United States Maritime Commission in the second half of 1939 and in 1940. Reed was a liaison to the Office of Production Management in Washington, D.C., which with the Supply Priorities and Allocations Board later became the War Production Board. He was an advisor to the Council of National Defense in 1941, which was a World War I organization that was reactivated for World War II and operated in 1940 and 1941.

On September 6, 1944, his wife, Bess M. Reed, sponsored the USS Torsk at its launch from the Portsmouth (Maine) Navy Yard.

== Personal life ==
Reed was from Liberty, Missouri. He graduated from Liberty High School in 1900.

Lieutenant Reed married the Bessie Moorhead of Omaha, Nebraska, on September 25, 1909, at the home of her parents in Omaha, Nebraska. Their son, Allen B. Reed, Jr. was born on June 11, 1912. He was also a captain in the Navy. In 1914, the Reeds lived in San Diego, California, where their daughter, Annis was born. They had two other daughters, Elizabeth and Katherine.

He died February 28, 1965, and was buried in Arlington National Cemetery. His wife, Bessie, died on September 27, 1966, and is buried with him at Arlington. Allen B. Reed, Jr. is also buried at Arlington. He died September 2, 1996.

== Date of ranks ==
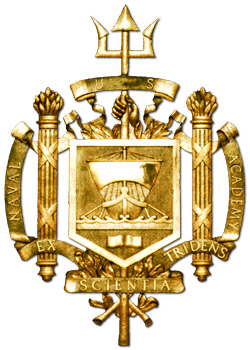
United States Naval Academy Midshipman – Class of 1904

Ensign	Lieutenant, Junior Grade	Lieutenant	Lieutenant Commander	Commander	Captain
O-1	O-2	O-3	O-4	O-5	O-6
					March 16, 1927
Source: Reed was ensign by April 1907, and lieutenant by October 13, 1909. He was made temporary commander due to an Act of Congress signed by President Woodrow Wilson in December 1917 and captain on March 16, 1927.

== Decorations and awards ==

Navy Cross	Philippine Campaign Medal	Nicaraguan Campaign Medal
Mexican Service Medal	World War I Victory Medal with "Transport" clasp	American Defense Service Medal

== Gallery ==
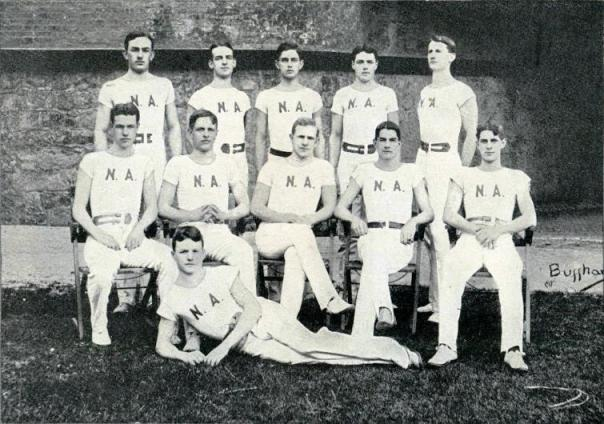
USNA Gymnastics Team, 1904. A.B. Reed, seated, second from right; H.E. Kimmel, seated, second from left

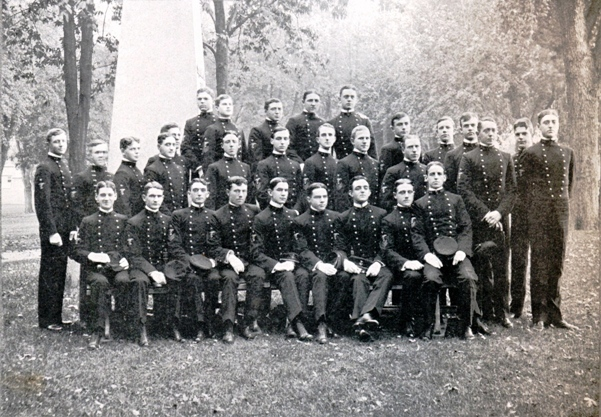
USNA First Class Cadet Petty Officers, 1904. A.B. Reed, seated, front row, center

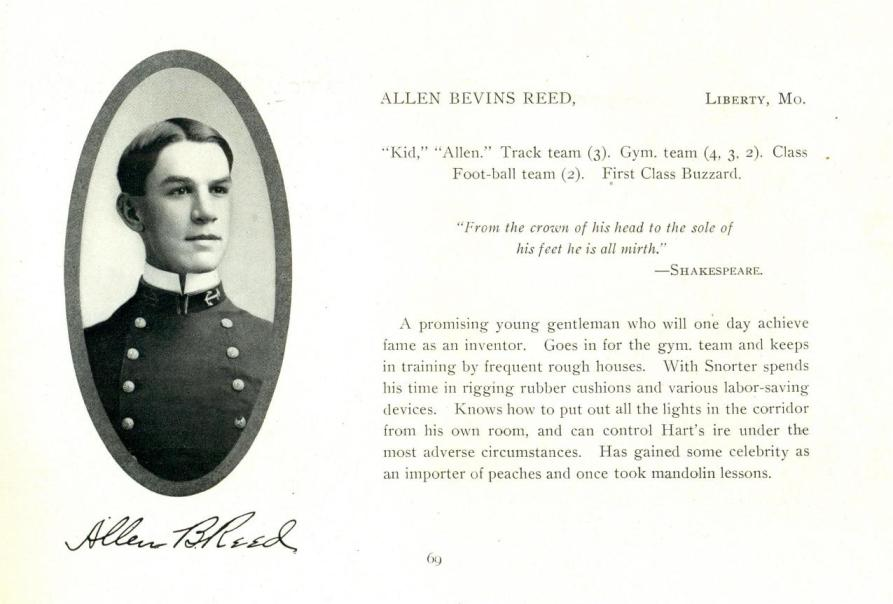
Midshipman Allen B. Reed in 1904
