= USS President Lincoln =

United States Navy troop transport ship

Coordinates: 47°57′N 15°11′W

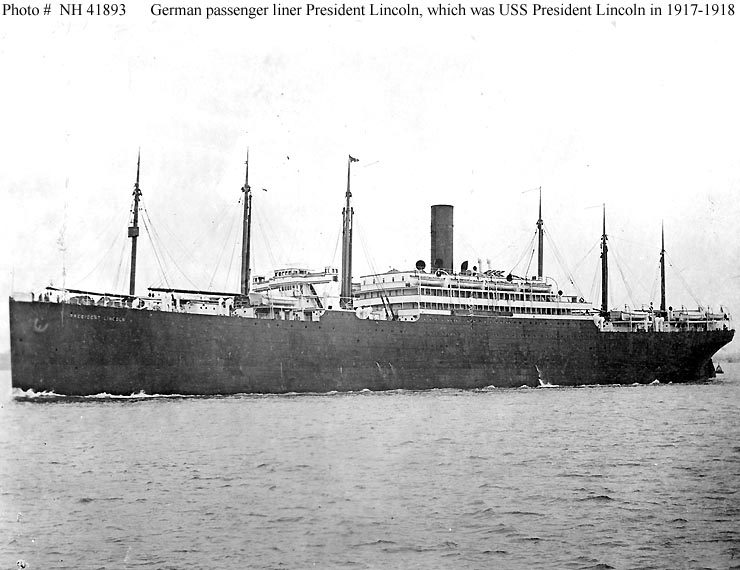

History

United States
- Name: President Lincoln
- Namesake: Abraham Lincoln
- Builder: Harland & Wolff
- Yard number: 353
- Launched: 8 October 1903
- Completed: 14 May 1907
- Acquired: Confiscated, 1917
- Commissioned: 25 July 1917
- Fate: Sunk 31 May 1918

General characteristics
- Type: Troop transport
- Tonnage: 18,084 GRT
- Displacement: 32,500 long tons (33,000 t)
- Length: 619 ft (189 m)
- Beam: 68 ft 2 in (20.78 m)
- Draft: 34 ft (10 m)
- Propulsion: Steam engine(s)
- Speed: 14.5 kn (26.9 km/h; 16.7 mph)
- Complement: 430 officers and enlisted
- Armament: 4 × 6 in (150 mm) guns

USS President Lincoln was a troop transport in the United States Navy during World War I.

Formerly the German steamer President Lincoln of the Hamburg-American Line, it was built by Harland & Wolff in Belfast, being completed in 1907. Seized in New York harbor in 1917, it was turned over to the Shipping Board and transferred to the Navy for operation as a troop transport.

Having been damaged severely by her German crew, the President Lincoln underwent extensive repairs and conversion at Robin's Dry Dock and Repair Company in Brooklyn, New York before being re-commissioned as a Navy troop transport at Brooklyn on 25 July 1917. Commander Yates Stirling Jr. was then placed in command.

== Service history ==
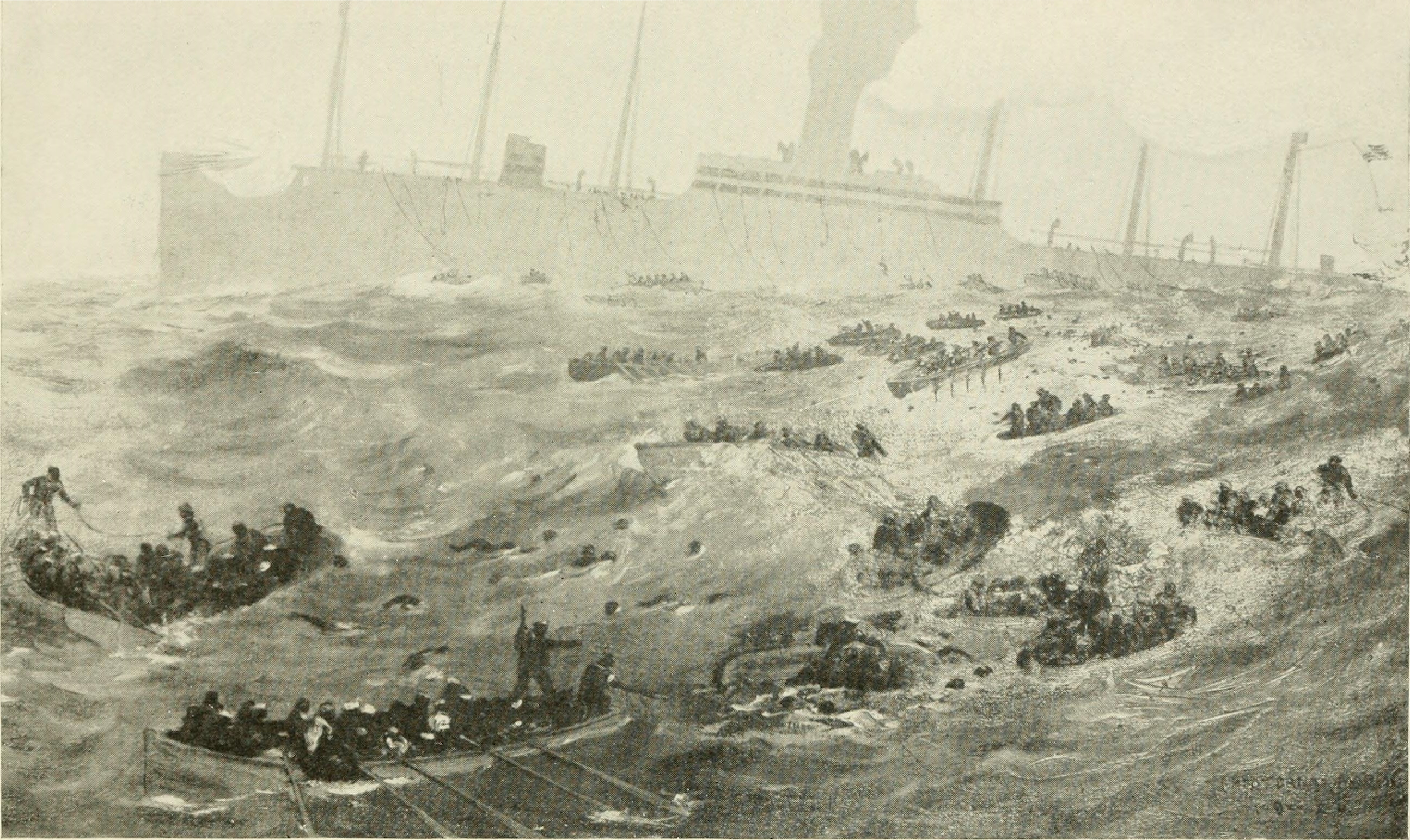
The sinking of USS President Lincoln, painting by Fred Dana Marsh, 1920

In US service, President Lincoln made five voyages from New York to France. Transporting approximately 23,000 American troops to Brest and St. Nazaire, four cycles were completed without incident: October–November 1917, December 1917 – January 1918, February–March, and March–May. She sailed from New York on her fifth and final trip to Europe on 10 May 1918. Arriving at Brest on the 23rd, she disembarked troops, and – escorted by destroyers – got underway on the 29th with troopships Rijndam, Susquehanna and Antigone for the return voyage to the U.S. At sundown on 30 May 1918, having passed through the so-called "danger zone" of submarine activity, the destroyers left the convoy to proceed alone. At about 09:00 on 31 May 1918, the President Lincoln was struck by three torpedoes from the German submarine U-90, and sank about 20 minutes later. Of the 715 people aboard, 26 men were lost with the ship, and a Lieutenant Edouard Izac was taken aboard U-90 as prisoner. Survivors were rescued from lifeboats late that night by destroyers Warrington and Smith. They were taken to France, arriving at Brest on 2 June.

== In popular culture ==
The lower-right of the 1920s painting depicting the sinking of the President Lincoln, cropped and flipped horizontally features as the cover for the album Since I Left You by The Avalanches.
