= USS New Orleans (CA-32) =

New Orleans class heavy cruiser (1933–1959)

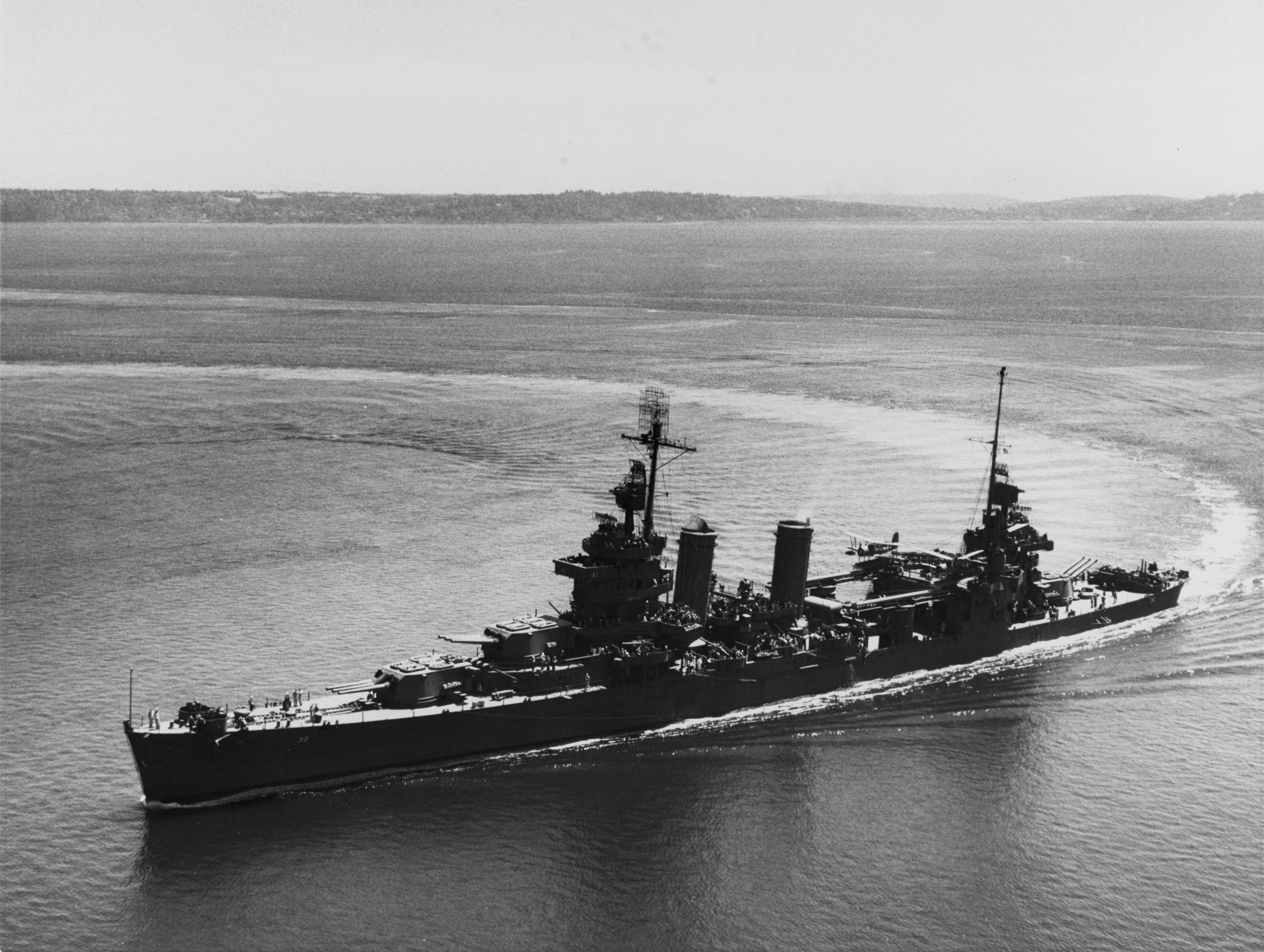
- USS New Orleans (CA-32), steams through a tight turn in Elliott Bay, Washington, on 30 July 1943, following battle damage repairs and overhaul at the Puget Sound Navy Yard.

History

United States
- Name: New Orleans
- Namesake: City of New Orleans, Louisiana
- Ordered: 13 February 1929
- Awarded: 12 July 1929 (date assigned to ship yard); 2 June 1930 (beginning of construction period)
- Builder: Brooklyn Navy Yard, Brooklyn, New York
- Cost: $12,000,000 (limit of price)
- Laid down: 14 March 1931
- Launched: 12 April 1933
- Sponsored by: Miss Cora S. Jahncke
- Commissioned: 15 February 1934
- Decommissioned: 10 February 1947
- Reclassified: CA-32, 1 July 1931
- Stricken: 1 March 1959
- Identification: Hull symbol: CL-32; Hull symbol:CA-32; Code letters: NABJ
- Nickname(s): NO Boat
- Honors and awards: 17 × battle stars; American Defense Service Medal; American Campaign Medal; Asiatic-Pacific Campaign Medal; World War II Victory Medal
- Fate: Sold for scrap 22 September 1959

General characteristics (as built)
- Class & type: New Orleans-class cruiser
- Displacement: 9,950 long tons (10,110 t) (standard)
- Length: 588 ft (179 m) oa; 574 ft (175 m) pp
- Beam: 61 ft 9 in (18.82 m)
- Draft: 19 ft 5 in (5.92 m) (mean); 23 ft 6 in (7.16 m) (max)
- Installed power: 8 × Babcock & Wilcox boilers; 107,000 shp (80,000 kW)
- Propulsion: 4 × Westinghouse geared turbines; 4 × screws
- Speed: 32.7 kn (37.6 mph; 60.6 km/h)
- Capacity: Fuel oil: 1,650 tons
- Complement: 96 officers 819 enlisted
- Armament: 9 × 8 in (203 mm)/55 caliber guns (3x3); 8 × 5 in (127 mm)/25 caliber anti-aircraft guns; 2 × 3-pounder 47 mm (1.9 in) saluting guns; 8 × caliber 0.50 in (13 mm) machine guns
- Armor: Belt: 3–5 in (76–127 mm); Deck: 1 1/4–2 1/4 in (32–57 mm); Barbettes: 5 in (130 mm); Turrets: 1 1/2–8 in (38–203 mm); Conning Tower: 5 in (127 mm)
- Aircraft carried: 4 × floatplanes
- Aviation facilities: 2 × Amidship catapults

General characteristics (1945)
- Armament: 9 × 8 in (203 mm)/55 caliber guns (3x3); 8 × 5 in (127 mm)/25 caliber anti-aircraft guns; 2 × 3-pounder 47 mm (2 in) saluting guns; 6 × quad 40 mm (1.6 in) Bofors anti-aircraft guns; 28 × single 20 mm (0.79 in) Oerlikon anti-aircraft cannons
- Aviation facilities: 1 × Amidship catapult

USS New Orleans (CL/CA-32) was the lead New Orleans-class cruiser in service with the United States Navy. The New Orleans-class cruisers were the last U.S. cruisers built to the specifications and standards of the Washington Naval Treaty of 1922. Such ships, with a limit of 10,000 long tons (10,160 t) standard displacement and 8-inch (203 mm) caliber main guns may be referred to as "treaty cruisers." While she was originally classified a light cruiser because of her thin armor, soon after being laid down she was reclassified as a heavy cruiser because of her 8-inch guns. The term "heavy cruiser" was not defined until the London Naval Treaty in 1930.

== Inter-war period ==
New Orleans's keel was laid on 14 March 1931, at the New York Navy Yard, commonly known as the Brooklyn Navy Yard. The ship was launched on 12 April 1933, sponsored by Cora S. Jahncke, a native of New Orleans, Louisiana, and daughter of Ernest L. Jahncke, a civil engineer and president of the Jahncke Shipbuilding Co. in New Orleans. Jahncke had served as assistant secretary of the Navy in the administration of President Herbert Hoover, returning to private life in March 1933 with the inauguration of President Franklin Delano Roosevelt. New Orleans was commissioned at the Brooklyn Navy Yard on 15 February 1934, with Captain Allen B. Reed as the first commander. Attending the commissioning ceremonies were Rear Admiral Yates Stirling Jr., commandant of the New York Naval Yard, and former Assistant Navy Secretary Jahncke. Among New Orleans' junior officer plankowners in 1934, were Jahncke's son, Ensign E.L. Jahncke Jr. and Ensign T.H. Moorer, who as Admiral Thomas H. Moorer was Chief of Naval Operations from 1967 to 1970 and chairman of the Joint Chiefs of Staff from 1970 to 1974.

Under Captain Reed's command that ended on 30 August 1935, New Orleans made a shakedown Transatlantic crossing to Great Britain and Scandinavia in May and June 1934. New Orleans made ports of call and was greeted by thousands at Stockholm, Sweden, Copenhagen, Denmark, Amsterdam, the Netherlands, and Portsmouth, England, returning to New York on 28 June. On 5 July, New Orleans sailed to Balboa, Panama, the western entrance to the Panama Canal to rendezvous with the heavy cruiser Houston, carrying President Roosevelt, on a nearly 12,000 nmi (22,000 km; 14,000 mi) cruise to Hawaii and an exercise with the United States Airship Macon and her aircraft off the California coast.

New Orleans reached Honolulu, Hawaii, on 26 July 1934, and Astoria, Oregon, on 2 August, where the cruise ended. New Orleans sailed at once for Panama and Cuba, stopping at San Pedro, Los Angeles, on 7 August 1934. She exercised off New England into 1935, then visited her namesake city at the end of March while en route to join United States Fleet Scouting Force Cruiser Division 6 based out of San Pedro, and operating along the coast of California and the eastern Pacific. New Orleans was open for public viewing while visiting the "Crescent City" and thousands of citizens visited the ship during the time she was berthed there. Shortly after arriving at San Pedro, the cruiser participated in fleet problem XVI from 29 April to 10 June. It was the largest mock battle ever staged and conducted in five separate stages over 5 million sq mi of the North Central Pacific between Midway, Hawaii, and the Aleutian Islands, involving 321 vessels and 70,000 men. In June, New Orleans visited San Diego for the first-ever Fleet Week, one of 114 American warships in the "mightiest fleet ever assembled under the U.S. flag" for the California Pacific International Exposition.

New Orleans returned to the Brooklyn Navy Yard in New York, where she was dry-docked for maintenance from 20 August to 7 December 1936. Early in 1937, she was once more in the Pacific. Aside from winter training in the Caribbean early in 1939, she served out of California ports until joining the Hawaiian Detachment on 12 October 1939, for exercises, training, and as war drew close, vigilant patrol.

== World War II ==
=== Attack on Pearl Harbor ===
Moored in Pearl Harbor on 7 December 1941, New Orleans was taking power and light from the dock, her engines under repair. With yard power out during the attack, New Orleans' engineers began to raise steam, working by flashlight, while on deck men fired on the Japanese attackers with rifles and pistols. The crew was forced to break the locks on the ammunition ready boxes as the keys could not be located, and because the ship was taking power from the dock, the 5"/25 cal AA gun had to be aimed and fired manually. The gunners topside were ducking machine gun bullets and shrapnel, training their guns manually, as they had no ammunition other than the few shells in their ready boxes. The ammunition hoists did not have power, making getting more ammunition topside to the gun crews nearly impossible. The 54 lb (24 kg) shells had to be pulled up the powerless hoists by ropes attached to their metal cases. Every man with no specific job at the moment formed ammunition lines to get the shells to the guns. A number of her crew were injured when a fragmentation bomb exploded close aboard. New Orleans suffered no severe damage during the attack.

=== 1942 ===
Before having the engine work complete at Pearl Harbor, the cruiser convoyed troops to Palmyra Atoll and Johnston Atoll operating on only three of her four engines; she then returned to San Francisco on 13 January 1942 for engineering repairs and installation of new search radar and 20 mm guns. She sailed on 12 February, commanding the escort for a troop convoy to Brisbane; from Australia, she screened a convoy to Nouméa, and returned to Pearl Harbor to join Task Force 11.

==== Battle of Coral Sea ====
Task Force 11 sortied on 15 April to join the Yorktown task force southwest of the New Hebrides. This joint force, together with a cruiser-destroyer group, won the Battle of the Coral Sea on 7–8 May, driving back a southward thrust of the Japanese, which threatened Australia and New Zealand and their seaborne lifelines. In this battle, Lexington was sunk and New Orleans stood by, her men diving overboard to rescue survivors and her boat crews closing the burning carrier, saving 580 of Lexington's crew who were subsequently landed at Nouméa. New Orleans then patrolled the eastern Solomons until sailing to replenish at Pearl Harbor.

==== Battle of Midway ====
New Orleans sailed on 28 May, screening Enterprise, to surprise the Japanese in the Battle of Midway. On 2 June, she met with the Yorktown force, and two days later joined battle. Three of the four Japanese carriers—Akagi, Kaga, and Soryu—were sunk by hits scored in dive bomber attacks. The fourth carrier, Hiryu, was found and wrecked later, but not before her dive bombers had damaged Yorktown so badly she had to be abandoned.

==== Battle of the Eastern Solomons ====
Again the New Orleans was replenished at Pearl Harbor, steaming out on 7 July to meet off the Fiji Islands for the invasion of the Solomon Islands, during which she screened the Saratoga. Fighting off enemy air attacks on 24–25 August, the New Orleans aided the U.S. Marine Corps beachhead on Guadalcanal, as a Japanese landing expedition was turned back in the Battle of the Eastern Solomons. At this point, New Orleans had been in the Coral Sea for two full months, and food began to run low. The crew went on half rations and Spam became the main course of every meal; eventually, they ran out of rice. When the Saratoga was torpedoed by a Japanese submarine on 31 August, the New Orleans escorted her to Pearl Harbor, arriving on 21 September.

==== Battle of Tassafaronga ====
With the repaired carrier, New Orleans sailed to Fiji early in November 1942, then proceeded to Espiritu Santo, arriving on 27 November to return to action in the Solomons. With four other cruisers and six destroyers, she fought in the Battle of Tassafaronga on the night of 30 November, engaging a Japanese destroyer-transport force. When the flagship Minneapolis was struck by two torpedoes, New Orleans, next astern, was forced to sheer away to avoid collision, and ran into the track of a torpedo, which detonated the ship's forward magazines and gasoline tanks. This explosion severed 150 ft (46 m) of her bow just forward of turret number two. The severed bow, including turret number one, swung around the port side and punched several holes in the length of New Orleans' hull before sinking at the stern and damaging the port inboard propeller. With one-quarter of her length gone, she slowed to 2 kn (2.3 mph; 3.7 km/h) and was on fire. Everyone in turrets one and two perished; 183 men were killed. Herbert Brown, a seaman in the ship's plotting room, described the scene after the torpedo hit:

"I had to see. I walked alongside the silent turret two and was stopped by a lifeline stretched from the outboard port lifeline to the side of the turret. Thank God it was there, for one more step and I would have pitched headfirst into the dark water 30 feet below. The bow was gone; 125 feet of ship and the number-one main battery turret with three 8-inch guns were gone. Eighteen hundred tons of ship were gone. Oh my God, all those guys I went through boot camp with – all gone"

Damage control parties managed to repair the ship enough to sail to Tulagi Harbor near daybreak on 1 December.

The crew camouflaged their ship from air attack, jury-rigged a bow of coconut logs, and worked clearing away wreckage. Eleven days later, New Orleans sailed stern first, to avoid sinking, to Cockatoo Island Dockyard in Sydney, Australia, arriving on 24 December. At Cockatoo, the damaged propeller was replaced and other repairs were made including the installation of a temporary stub bow. On 7 March 1943, she left Sydney for Puget Sound Navy Yard, sailing backward the entire voyage, where a new bow was fitted with the use of Minneapolis' number-two turret. All battle damage was repaired, and she was given a major refit involving the reduction of the forward superstructure along the lines of other prewar cruisers, adding new air-search and surface-search radars, as well as numerous 20 mm and 40 mm Bofors antiaircraft guns. In addition, her boilers, machinery, and hull structures were overhauled to almost new condition. She continued to sail with the back portion (aft) riveted and the front portion (bow) welded.

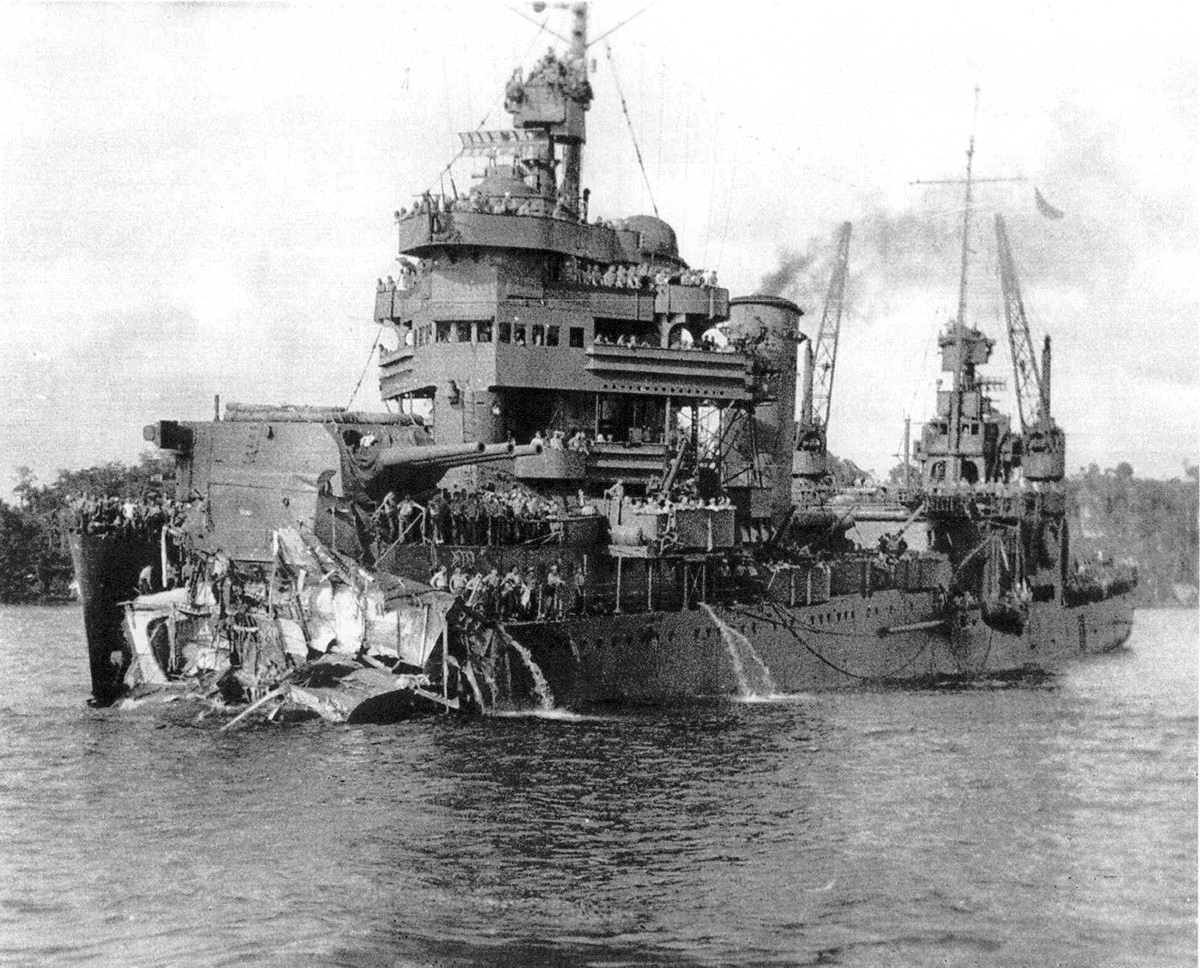
New Orleans with torpedo damage in Tulagi Harbor on 1 December 1942 after the Battle of Tassafaronga.

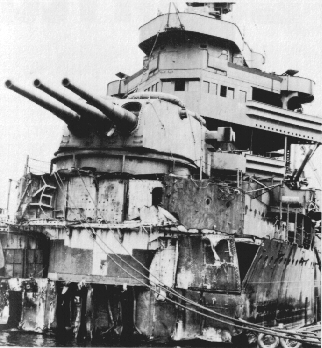
Damage to New Orleans with everything ahead of turret number two missing after being hit by a single torpedo that detonated her forward magazines. This was photographed after the Battle of Tassafaronga, which occurred on 30 November 1942.

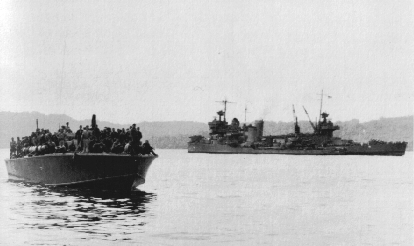
New Orleans seen after the Battle of Tassafaronga near Tulagi on 1 December 1942: The PT boat in the foreground is carrying survivors from Northampton.

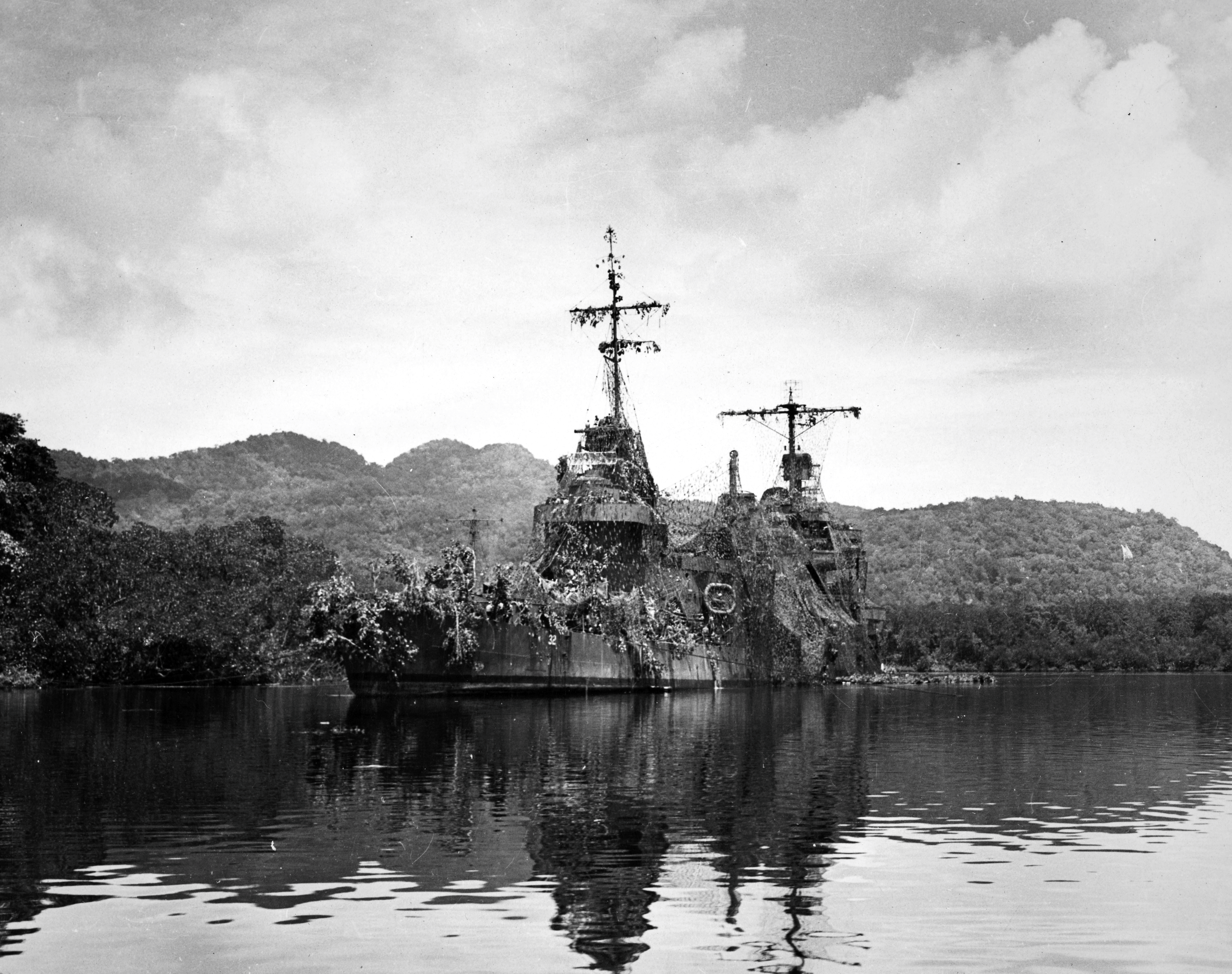
New Orleans under a camouflage net at Tulagi undergoing field repairs suffered in the Battle of Tassafaronga on 1 December 1942: Once field repairs were completed, New Orleans traveled to rear-area ports for further repairs.

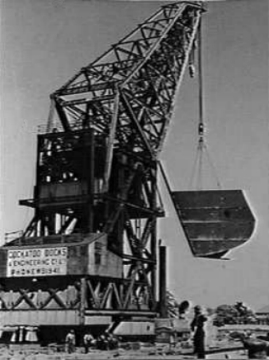
Titan lifting temporary bow to be welded New Orleans at Cockatoo Island Dockyard

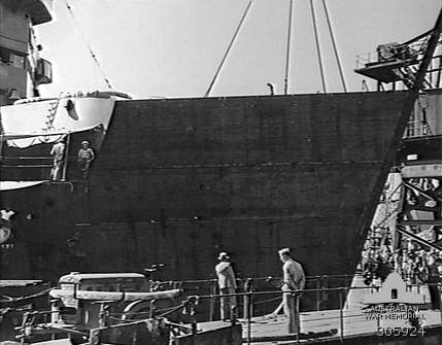
False bow being fitted to New Orleans

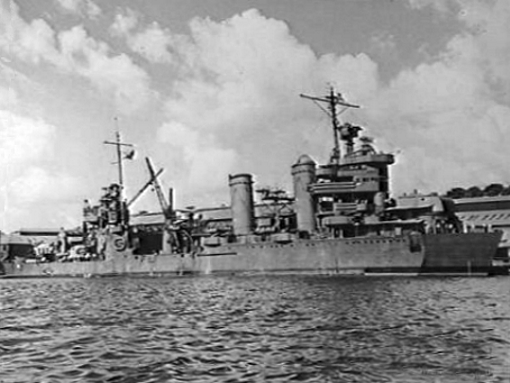
Temporary bow fitted to New Orleans to enable her return to the United States to repair damage sustained from torpedo damage at the Battle of Tassafaronga: The 8 in (200 mm) guns have been removed from the number-two turret.

=== 1943 ===
Returning to Pearl Harbor on 31 August for combat training, New Orleans next joined a cruiser-destroyer force to bombard Wake Island on 5–6 October, repulsing a Japanese torpedo-plane attack. Her next sortie from Pearl Harbor came on 10 November, when she sailed to fire precision bombardment in the Gilberts on 20 November, then to screen carriers striking the eastern Marshalls on 4 December. In aerial attacks that day, the new Lexington, namesake of the carrier whose men New Orleans had pulled from the Coral Sea, was torpedoed, and New Orleans guarded her successful retirement to repairs at Pearl Harbor, arriving on 9 December.

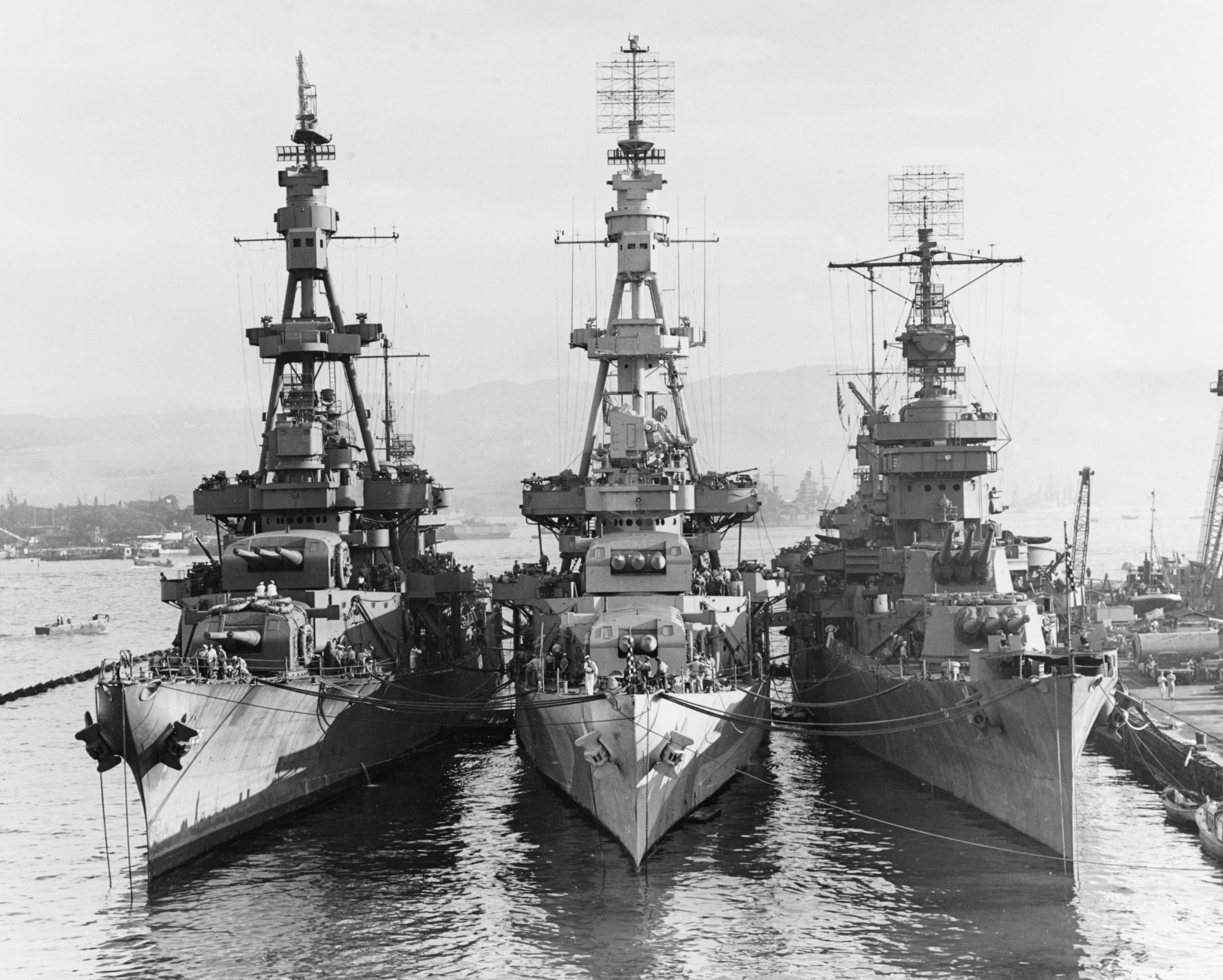
Pensacola class cruisers Salt Lake City and Pensacola, with New Orleans (L to R), at Pearl Harbor in 1943

=== 1944 ===
From 29 January 1944, New Orleans fired on targets in the Marshalls, hitting air installations and shipping as the Navy took Kwajalein. She fueled at Majuro, then sailed 11 February to join the fast carriers in a raid on Truk, Japanese bastion in the Carolines on 17–18 February. While air strikes were flown, New Orleans, with other warships circled the atoll to catch escaping ships; the task force's combined gunfire sank a light cruiser, a destroyer, a trawler, and a submarine chaser. The force sailed on to hit the Marianas, then returned to Majuro and Pearl Harbor.

The carriers, with New Orleans in escort, attacked targets in the Carolines late in March, then in April, sailed south to support Allied landings at Hollandia (currently known as Jayapura), New Guinea. There on 22 April, a disabled Yorktown plane flew into New Orleans' mainmast, hitting gun mounts as it fell into the sea. The ship was sprayed with gas as the plane exploded on hitting the water; one crew member was lost, and another badly injured, but New Orleans continued in action, patrolling and plane guarding off New Guinea, then joining in further raids on Truk and Satawan, which she bombarded on 30 April. She returned to Majuro on 4 May.

Preparations were made in the Marshalls for the invasion of the Marianas, for which New Orleans sortied from Kwajalein on 10 June. She bombarded Saipan on 15–16 June, then joined the screen protecting carriers as they prepared to meet the Japanese Mobile Fleet in the Battle of the Philippine Sea.

New Orleans made patrols and bombardments on Saipan and Tinian into August, returned to Eniwetok on the 13th, and sailed the 28th for carrier raids on the Bonins, bombardments of Iwo Jima on 1–2 September, and direct air support for the invasion of the Palaus. After reprovisioning at Manus, the task force assaulted Okinawa, Formosa, and Northern Luzon, destroying Japanese land-based aviation, which otherwise would have threatened the landings on Leyte on 20 October.

New Orleans was present during the Battle of Leyte Gulf, which started on 23 October. On 25 October, the Fast Carrier Strike Force had steamed north, to attack the Northern Force commanded by Jisaburō Ozawa. New Orleans again screened for the carriers, which sank or damaged several Japanese carriers. Task Force 34 was detached to finish off several of the crippled Japanese ships with gunfire; New Orleans and three other cruisers sank the light carrier Chiyoda and the destroyer Hatsuzuki.

=== 1945 ===
After replenishing at Ulithi, New Orleans guarded carriers during raids throughout the Philippines in preparation for the invasion of Mindoro, then late in December, sailed for a Mare Island Navy Yard overhaul, followed by training in Hawaii. She returned to Ulithi on 18 April 1945, and two days later, departed to join Task Force 54, in the ongoing invasion of Okinawa, arriving at Okinawa on 23 April. Here, she engaged with shore batteries and fired directly against the enemy lines. After nearly two months on station, she sailed to replenish and repair in the Philippines, and was at Subic Bay when hostilities ceased in the Pacific War.

== Post-war ==
New Orleans sailed on 28 August with a cruiser-destroyer force to ports of China and Korea. She covered the internment of Japanese ships at Tsingtao, the evacuation of liberated Allied prisoners of war, and the landing of troops in Korea and China. She sailed on 17 November from the mouth of the Peking River (Hai He), carrying veterans homeward bound. More returning troops came aboard at the Sasebo U.S. Fleet Activities base, and all were disembarked at San Francisco on 8 December. After similar duty took her to Guam in January 1946, she sailed through the Panama Canal for a 10-day visit to her namesake city. She then steamed to Philadelphia Navy Yard, arriving on 12 March. There, she was decommissioned on 10 February 1947 and lay in reserve until struck from the Naval Vessel Register on 1 March 1959 and sold for scrapping on 22 September to Boston Metals Company, Baltimore, Maryland.

== Discovery of lost bow ==
On 7 July 2025, a team of explorers led by the Ocean Exploration Trust and Robert Ballard on the research vessel Nautilus discovered the wreck of the bow section New Orleans lost during the Battle of Tassafaronga using a remotely operated underwater vehicle. The bow lies at a depth of 675 metres (2,215 ft) and contains details identifying it as belonging to New Orleans, such as anchor-imprinted text reading "Navy Yard".

== Awards ==
- American Defense Service Medal
- American Campaign Medal
- Asiatic-Pacific Campaign Medal with 17 battle stars
- World War II Victory Medal

The 17 battle stars New Orleans received for her World War II service placed her among the most decorated U.S. naval vessels of World War II.

Members of New Orleans′s crew were awarded five Navy Crosses, 10 Silver Stars, one Bronze Star, one Air Medal, and 206 Purple Hearts.

== Legacy ==
- One destroyer (DD) and four destroyer escorts (DE) were named after USS New Orleans sailors killed in action at the Battle of Tassafaronga.
1. USS Rogers (DD-876) (similar to the five Sullivan brothers who were lost on USS Juneau (CL-52), the three Rogers brothers who all served on New Orleans died at the Battle of Tassafaronga)
2. USS Hayter (DE-212),
3. USS Foreman (DE-633),
4. USS Swenning (DE-394),
5. USS Haines (DE-792/APD-84).
- Diosdado Rome, OCC of New Orleans has been additionally honored by the naming of a mess hall at the Naval Station Pearl Harbor in his name, the Diosdado Rome Galley.
- The famous song "Praise the Lord and Pass the Ammunition" written by Frank Loesserh was inspired by those heartening words uttered by Chaplain Howell M. Forgy of New Orleans during the attack on Pearl Harbor, 7 December 1941.
- When New Orleans was sold for scrap, little was saved. However, a few items from the ship are on display at the USS Kidd and Louisiana Veterans Memorial in Baton Rouge, Louisiana. In particular, it has the ship's bell and the builder's model of the ship, as well as some mementos of the launching ceremony. Some items are at the Patriots Point Naval and Maritime Museum in Charleston Harbor, South Carolina, and at the Navy–Marine Corps Memorial Stadium in Annapolis, Maryland. A plaque was donated to the National Museum of the Pacific War in Fredericksburg, Texas, by New Orleans Reunion Association. A memorial honoring New Orleans has been installed in the New Orleans Walk of Fame outside the Hilton Hotel in downtown New Orleans.
- The flag flown by New Orleans when she was struck by the torpedo on 30 November 1942 is on display in the U.S. Naval Academy Museum, Annapolis, Maryland.
- She is also featured in the game World of Warships as the seventh US Navy cruiser available on the nation's ship tree.
- She is also featured in the game War Thunder.
