= SS Antigone =

A number of steamships were named Antigone, including -

- SS Antigone (1900), a cargo ship which carried this name for four days before being commissioned into the United States Navy.
- SS Antigone (1928), a British cargo ship torpedoed and sunk during World War II.
