= USS Paysandu =

U.S. Navy transport vessel

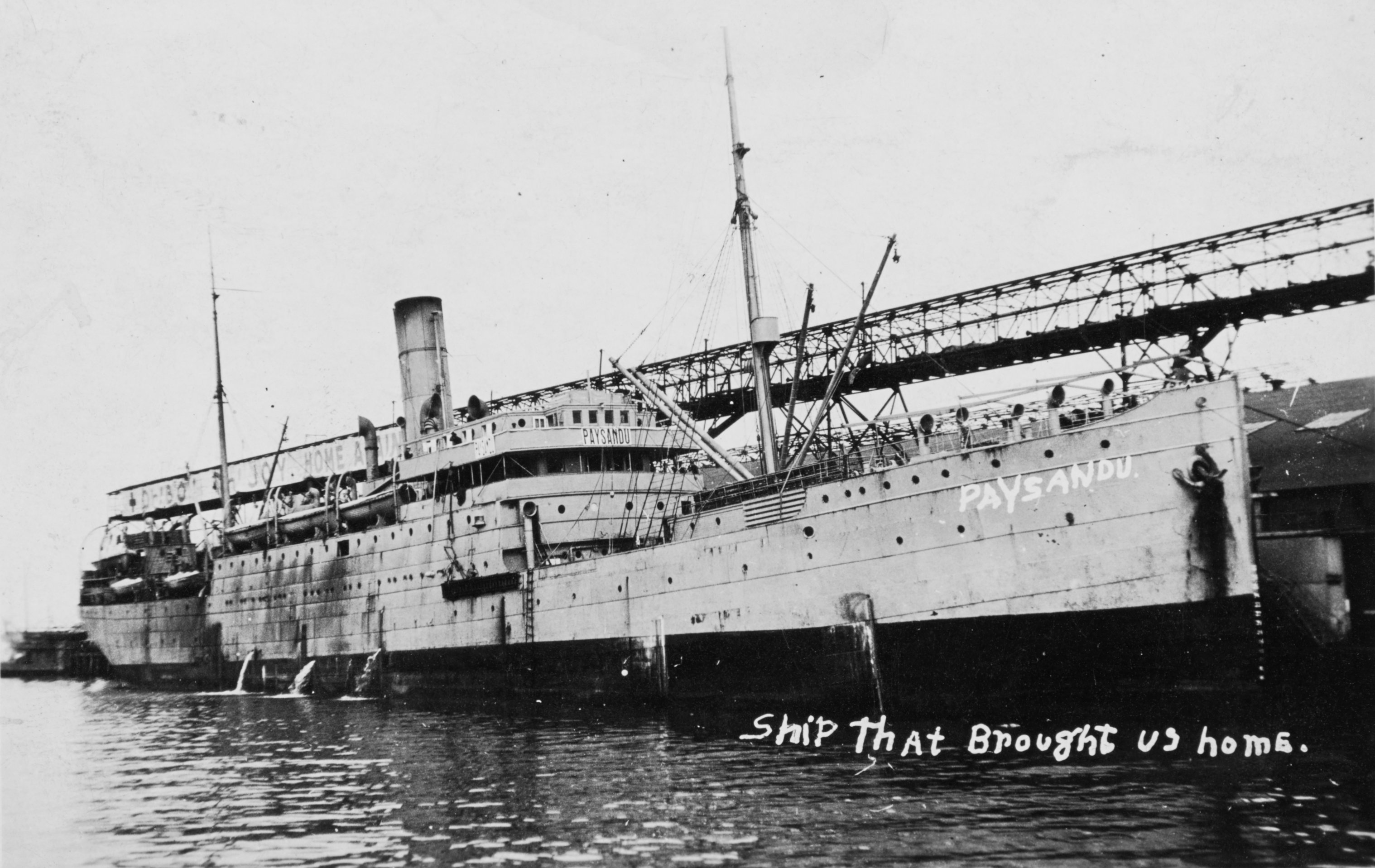
- USS Paysandu (ID-3880) in port, 1919

History
- Name: USS Paysandu (ID-3880)
- Namesake: Paysandú, Uruguay
- Owner: Hamburg South American Line (1898–1917); Govt. of Uruguay (1917–1928)
- Operator: Hamburg South American Line (1898–1917); United States Navy (Jan–Jul 1919); Govt. of Uruguay (Jul 1919–1928)
- Builder: Reiherstieg Schiffswerke & Maschinenfabrik (Hamburg, Germany)
- Yard number: 400
- Launched: 19 April 1898
- Christened: Bahia
- Completed: May 1898
- Renamed: USS Paysandu (ID-3880) (1919); Paysandu {Jul 1919)
- Fate: Scrapped at Copenhagen, Denmark, January 1928

General characteristics
- Type: Troop transport (Jan–Jul 1919)
- Tonnage: 4,817 GRT; 3,106 net
- Displacement: 9,004 tons
- Length: 375 ft 8 in (114.5 m)
- Beam: 46 ft 6 in (14.2 m)
- Draft: 24 ft (7.3 m)
- Depth of hold: 27 ft 4 in (8.3 m)
- Installed power: 1 × 2,200 ihp 4-cyl. quadruple expansion; 4 boilers
- Propulsion: Single screw
- Speed: Original: 12.5 kn (14.4 mph; 23.2 km/h); 1919: 11 kn (13 mph; 20 km/h)
- Capacity: 25 officers, 1,300 enlisted
- Complement: 21 officers, 168 enlisted

USS Paysandu (ID-3880) was a troop transport acquired to repatriate U.S. troops from France after World War I.

Paysandu was originally SS Bahia, a passenger-cargo ship built in 1898 for the Hamburg South American Line. With the outbreak of World War I in 1914, Bahia was interned at Montevideo, Uruguay. Seized by the Uruguayan government in 1917, Bahia was transferred to the management of the United States Shipping Board in late 1918, converted into a troop transport in New Jersey and commissioned as USS Paysandu (ID-3880). Paysandu made two round trips from the United States to France between May and July 1919 before being decommissioned and returned to Uruguay.

The ship subsequently re-entered merchant service as SS Paysandu, before being scrapped in Denmark in 1928.

== Construction and design ==
Paysandu was originally SS Bahia, a steel-hulled, single-screw passenger-cargo steamer. Bahia was built at Hamburg, Germany in 1898 by Reiherstieg Schiffswerke & Maschinenfabrik (Reiherstieg Shipbuilding and Engineering Works) for the Hamburg Sildamerikanische Dampfshifffahrts Gesellschaft (Hamburg–South American Steamship Company). Bahia's yard number was 400. The ship was launched 19 April 1898 and completed in May.

Bahia had a length of 375 feet 8 inches (114.5 m), a beam of 46 feet 6 inches (14.2 m), draft of 24 feet (7.3 m) and hold depth of 27 feet 4 inches (8.3 m). (Note: Ship dimensions typically vary slightly in different sources.) She had a gross register tonnage of 4,817, net register tonnage of 3,106, and displacement of 9,004 long tons. The ship had eight watertight bulkheads, two decks, two masts and a single smokestack.

Bahia was powered by a 2,200 ihp four-cylinder quadruple expansion steam engine with cylinders of 21, 32, 46 and 66 inches (53, 81, 117 and 168 cm) by 51-inch (130 cm) stroke, driving a single screw propeller. Steam was supplied by two doubled-ended and two single-end boilers at a working pressure of 213 psi (1,470 kPa). The ship had a speed of 12.5 knots (14.4 mph; 23.2 km/h).

== Service history ==
=== Early service, 1898–1918 ===
Following her completion in May 1898, Bahia entered service with the Hamburg–South American Line. While Bahia's particular route is not known, ships of the Hamburg–South American Line operated between Hamburg, Germany and several localities in Brazil including Bahia, Rio de Janeiro and Santos, São Paulo; to Central America; and between Brazil and New York, United States. Bahia continued in operation with the Hamburg–South American Line until the outbreak of World War I in 1914, when she was interned in Montevideo, Uruguay.

In 1917, Bahia was seized by the Government of Uruguay and transferred to the United States Shipping Board. Renamed SS Paysandu, the ship departed Montevideo 30 September 1918, arriving at New York shortly after the end of the war on 24 November 1918.

=== U.S. Navy troop transport, January–July 1919 ===
With the foreign contingent of the American Cruiser and Transport Force having withdrawn at the close of the war, the U.S. government needed additional capacity to repatriate U.S. troops from France, and Paysandu consequently became one of 56 ships selected for conversion into troop transports. The ship was converted between 5 January and 1 March 1919 at Hoboken, New Jersey by the W. & A. Fletcher Company, at a cost of $173,360. On 29 January, while still undergoing conversion, Paysandu was acquired by the U.S. Navy and commissioned as USS Paysandu (ID-3880). After the conversion, USS Paysandu had a troop-carrying capacity of 25 officers and 1,300 enlisted men, and a crew complement of 21 officers and 168 enlisted men.

Assigned to the Cruiser and Transport Force, Paysandu departed for the Army's large embarkation center at St. Nazaire, France, where, on 16 May, she embarked elements of the Baltimore 313th Infantry Regiment, including the 2nd Battalion and K, M, and Machine Gun Companies—a total of 27 officers and 1,351 men. The ship departed St. Nazaire for Newport News, Virginia at 4 pm the same day, with the remainder of the regiment leaving two days later aboard USS Antigone (ID-3007).

The regimental historian notes of the voyage aboard Paysandu that the ship "was not in very good condition, as she had been laid up for years in South America and it was impossible to get any speed out of her. She was only 375 feet long and had no cargo in her and pitched and rolled constantly, causing a great deal of seasickness." Nonetheless, the troops were in good spirits as they were homeward bound. Paysandu had better food and accommodations than the troops had enjoyed on their outbound journey to France aboard USS Leviathan, and the troops were permitted on deck more frequently. To help pass the time on Paysandu, the Regimental "theatrical talent" organized shows and concerts, while "moving picture outfits" and boxing and wrestling matches provided further entertainment. The Regimental barbers were also kept busy, as many of the troops were keen to look their best on their arrival home.

Though Paysandu had departed St. Nazaire two days earlier than Antigone, the latter arrived at Newport News first, on 29 May, with Paysandu docking three days later on the night of Sunday, 1 June, her troops disembarking the following morning. On 3 June, the Regiment departed in two contingents on the steamer Essex for Baltimore, where the returning troops received a reception of such enthusiasm it is said to have "resembled a riot."

After disembarking the 313th, Paysandu made a second voyage to France, returning to the United States 14 July. On her two-round trips between France and the United States, the ship repatriated a total of 2,736 troops, including four sick or wounded. Her naval assignments complete, Paysandu was detached from the Cruiser and Transport Force 16 July and decommissioned on the 29th, after which she was returned to the USSB, who in turn re-delivered the vessel to her owners, the Government of Uruguay.

=== Later history ===
Following her return to the Uruguayan Government in late 1919, Paysandu re-entered merchant service as SS Paysandu. Little is known about her subsequent career, but the ship is known to have made a couple of voyages to New York in this period, one from Montevideo in May 1920 and another from Buenos Aires, Argentina in January 1923.

SS Paysandu was scrapped at Copenhagen, Denmark, on 26 January 1928.
