= USS Susquehanna (ID-3016) =

United States Naval Ship

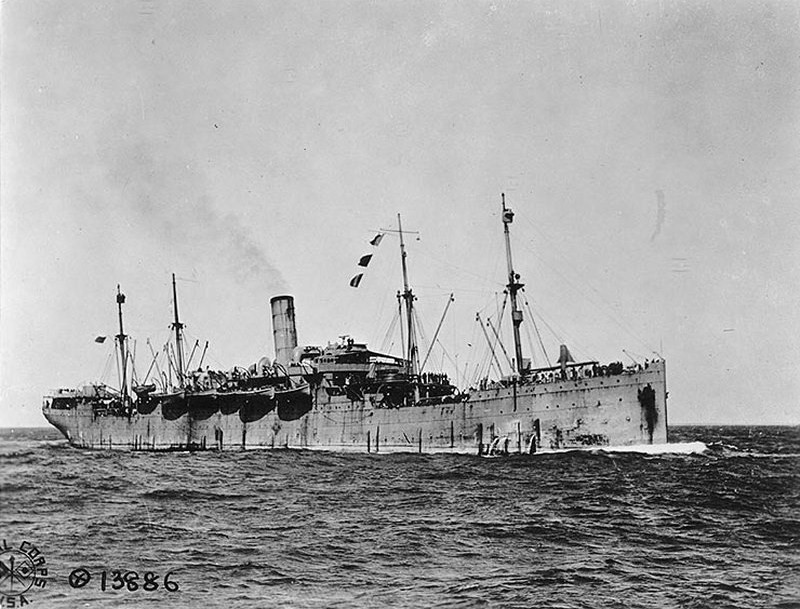
- USS Susquehanna (ID-3016)

History

German Empire
- Name: SS Rhein
- Namesake: the Rhine river (German: Rhein)
- Owner: North German Lloyd
- Port of registry: Bremen
- Route: 1900: Bremen–Baltimore; 1901: Bremen – New York; 1901: Bremen – Suez Canal – Australia; 1902–1911: From Bremen variously to New York, Baltimore, or Philadelphia
- Builder: Blohm & Voss; Hamburg, Germany
- Launched: 20 September 1899
- Maiden voyage: Bremen – New York, 9 December 1899
- Fate: Interned in Baltimore, 1914; seized by United States, 6 April 1917

United States
- Name: USS Susquehanna (ID-3016)
- Namesake: Susquehanna River
- Acquired: 6 April 1917
- Commissioned: 5 September 1917
- Decommissioned: 27 August 1919
- Fate: turned over to United States Shipping Board

United States
- Name: SS Susquehanna
- Owner: United States Shipping Board
- Operator: 1921: United States Mail Steamship Company; 1922: United States Lines
- Route: 1921: New York – Bremen – Danzig; 1922: New York – Plymouth – Cherbourg – Bremen
- Fate: laid up, August 1922; sold for scrapping in Japan, November 1928

General characteristics
- Class & type: Rhein-class ocean liner
- Tonnage: 10,058 GRT
- Length: 152.70 m (501 ft 0 in) lbp; 158.50 m (520 ft 0 in) o/a
- Beam: 17.83 m (58 ft 6 in)
- Draft: 8.50 m (27 ft 11 in)
- Propulsion: 2 quadruple-expansion steam engines; twin screw propellers
- Speed: 13–14 knots (24–26 km/h; 15–16 mph)
- Crew: 140–174
- Notes: 1 funnel, 4 masts

General characteristics as USS Susquehanna
- Displacement: 17,857 t
- Length: 520 ft (160 m)
- Beam: 58 ft 1 in (17.70 m)
- Draft: 28 ft (8.5 m)
- Speed: 14 knots (26 km/h)
- Complement: 514
- Armament: 4 × 6-inch (150 mm) guns; 2 × 1-pounder guns; 2 × machine guns

USS Susquehanna (ID-3016) was a transport for the United States Navy during World War I. She was the second U.S. Navy ship to be named for the Susquehanna River. Before the war she operated at SS Rhein, an ocean liner for North German Lloyd. She was the lead ship of her class of three ocean liners. After the end of World War I, the ship operated briefly in passenger service as SS Susquehanna. Laid up in 1922, Susquehanna was sold to Japanese ship breakers in 1928 and scrapped.

== History ==
SS Rhein was launched on 20 September 1899 by Blohm & Voss of Hamburg, Germany, for North German Lloyd. The ship was 152.70 metres (501 ft 0 in) long between perpendiculars (158.50 metres (520 ft 0 in) overall) was 58 feet 1 inch (17.70 m) abeam, and had a draft of 8.5 metres (28 ft). The ship's two quadruple-expansion steam engines turned her twin screw propellers that drove her at speeds of 13 to 14 knots (24 to 26 km/h; 15 to 16 mph).

Rhein sailed from Bremen to New York on 9 December 1899 for her maiden voyage, and began regular Bremen–Baltimore service in May 1900. Later that same year, Rhein served as a transport carrying German Empire troops as part of the Eight-Nation Alliance intended to put down the Boxer Rebellion in China. From September to November 1901, Rhein sailed on a Bremen – Suez Canal – Australia route.

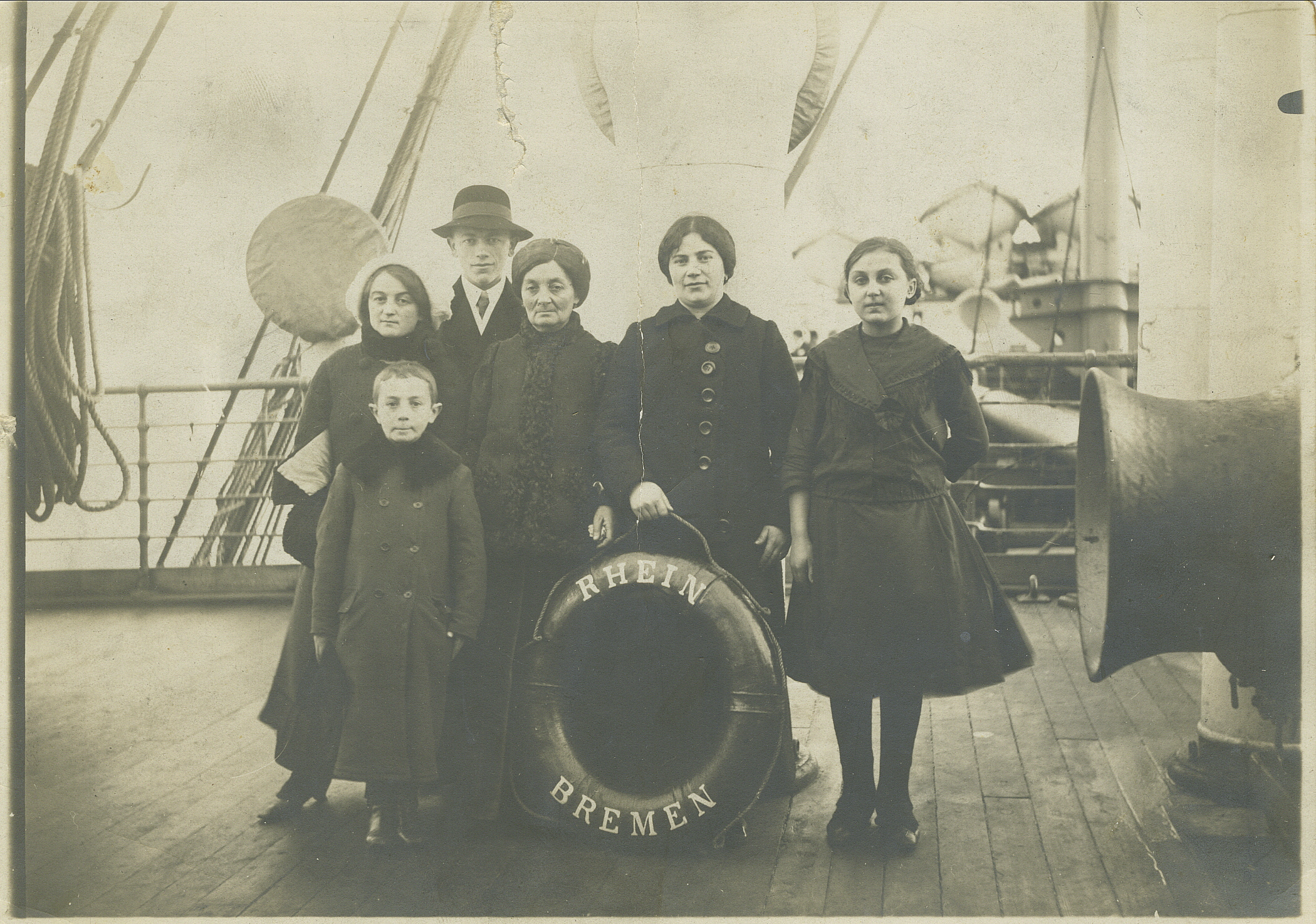
1913 photo of Austrian Jewish immigrants on board SS Rhein arriving in Philadelphia

Returning to North Atlantic sailings at the end of 1901, Rhein sailed from Bremen variously to New York, Baltimore, or Philadelphia through 1914. She began what would become her last voyage for North German Lloyd on 16 July 1914 when she left Bremen bound for Baltimore, and was in that port when Germany declared war in early August. As a neutral in the war at that time, the United States interned the liner and her sister ship Neckar, which was also in Baltimore. The two sisters would remain idle in Baltimore for almost three years.

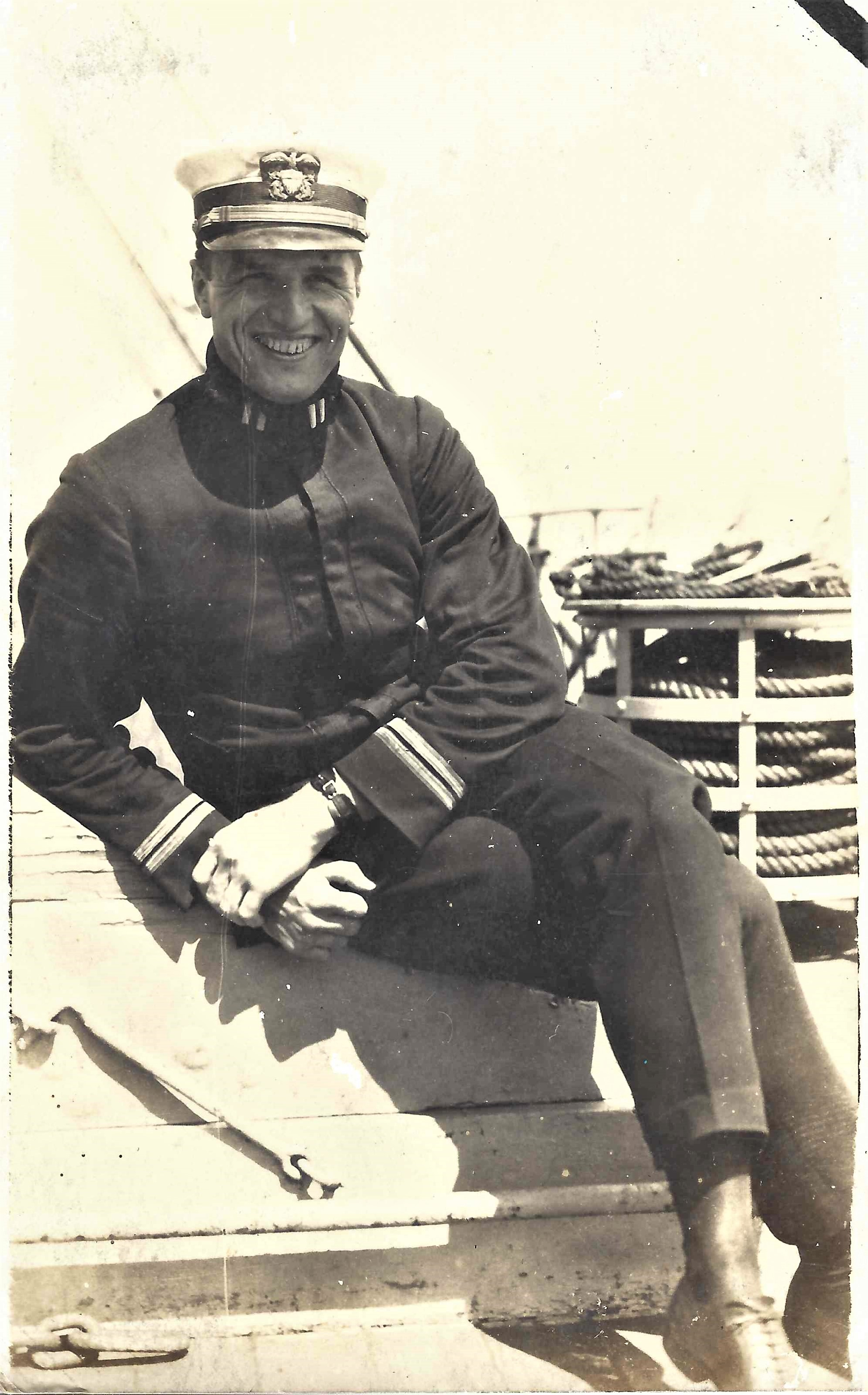
Photo of Allen Reed, captain of USS Susquehanna taken during World War I, aboard USS Susquehanna – formerly Rhein

After the United States declared war on Germany on 6 April 1917, Rhein, along with all other German ships interned in American ports, was seized by U.S. authorities. Initially handed over to the United States Shipping Board (USSB), she was later transferred to the U.S. Navy to effect repairs caused by neglect and sabotage by her German crew. The ship was overhauled, reconditioned, fitted out as a transport, and commissioned as USS Susquehanna at Norfolk, Virginia, on 5 September 1917. USS Susquehanna sailed from New York on her first voyage with troops on 14 December 1917, under the command of Captain Zachariah H. Madison with Commander Allen B. Reed, executive officer. Subsequently, Commander Reed relieved Captain Madison of command on 22 August 1918. Both commanding officers were awarded the Navy Cross in 1920 for the hazardous duty of commanding the troop ship through waters that were mined and patrolled by German U-boats.

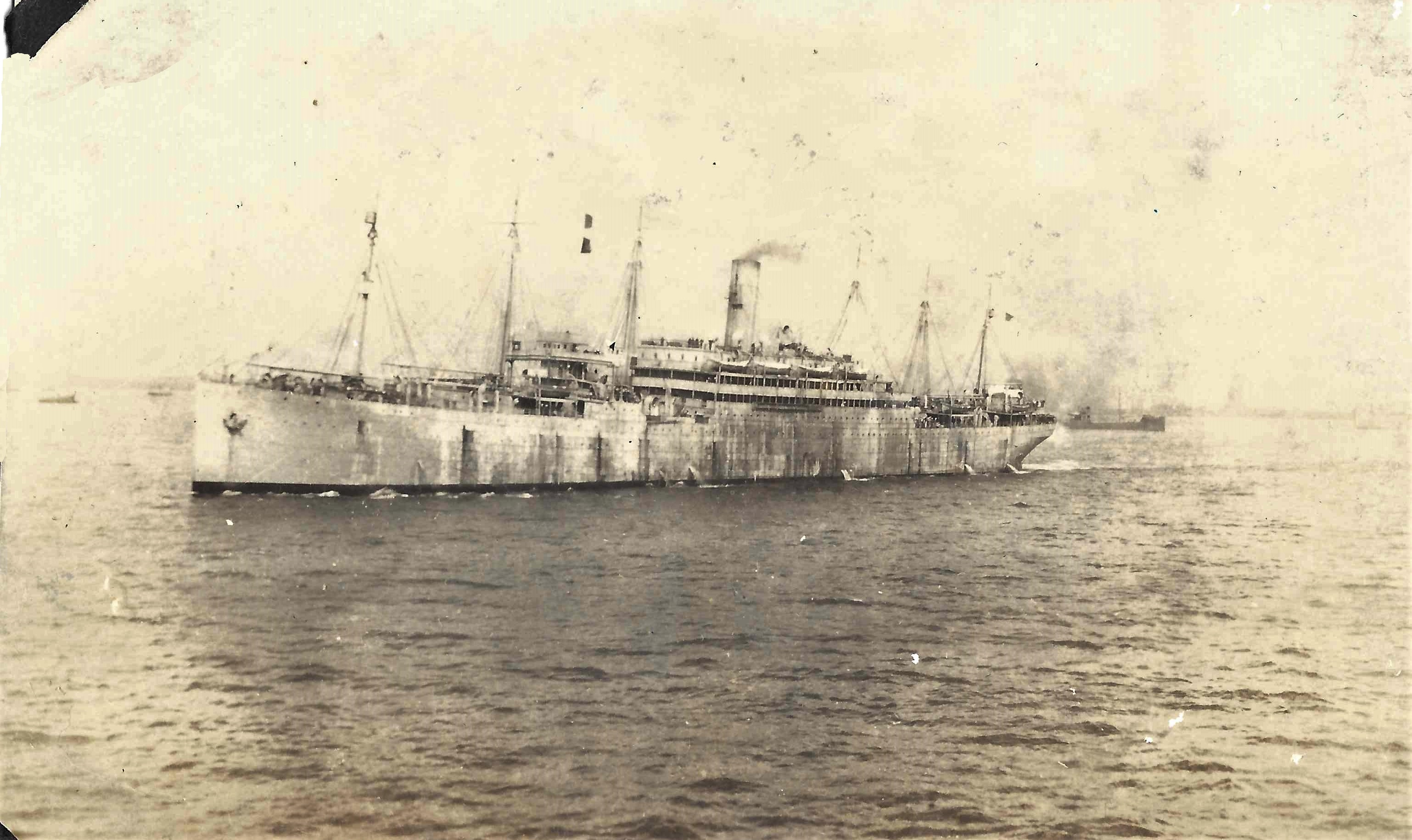
Photo of ship in convoy with USS Susquehanna (possible Lincoln), taken from Susquehanna

On 29 May 1918, Susquehanna, escorted by three American and one French destroyer, got underway from Brest, France, with troopships Rijndam, President Lincoln and Antigone for the return voyage to the U.S. At sundown on 30 May 1918, having passed through the so-called "danger zone" of submarine activity, the destroyers left the convoy to proceed alone. At about 09:00 on 31 May 1918, President Lincoln, with Commander Percy Foote, in command, was struck by three torpedoes from the German submarine U-90, and sank about 20 minutes later. Of the 715 people aboard, 26 men were lost with the ship, and a Lieutenant Edward Isaacs was taken aboard U-90 as prisoner. Survivors were rescued from lifeboats late that night by destroyers Warrington and Smith. They were taken to France, arriving at Brest on 2 June. President Lincoln at 33,000 tons, was the largest U.S. Naval vessel to be lost in World War I.

Susquehanna was attached to the Cruiser and Transport Force and made eight round trips to Europe before the Armistice, transporting 18,348 troops. After the Armistice, she made seven more voyages to France and returned 15,537 passengers to the United States. In addition to the initial voyage from New York, Susquehanna's voyages were from Newport News, Virginia, to Brest, France, and to Saint-Nazaire, France. Susquehanna was placed out of commission on 27 August 1919 and turned over to the USSB.

The ship was chartered to the United States Mail Steamship Company (U.S. Mail Line) and began passenger service from New York to Bremen in August 1920. When the U.S. Mail Line ran into financial difficulties, SS Susquehanna, along with the other six former German vessels the company had chartered, was seized in April 1921 by the USSB, and later placed with the newly formed United States Lines. Beginning in April 1922, Susquehanna sailed on a New York – Plymouth – Cherbourg – Bremen route. Laid up in September 1922 after completing five roundtrips for United States Lines, the ship was sold in November 1928 to Japanese interests for scrapping.
