= Victory Destroyer Plant =

Coordinates: 42°17′59.36″N 71°1′46.38″W

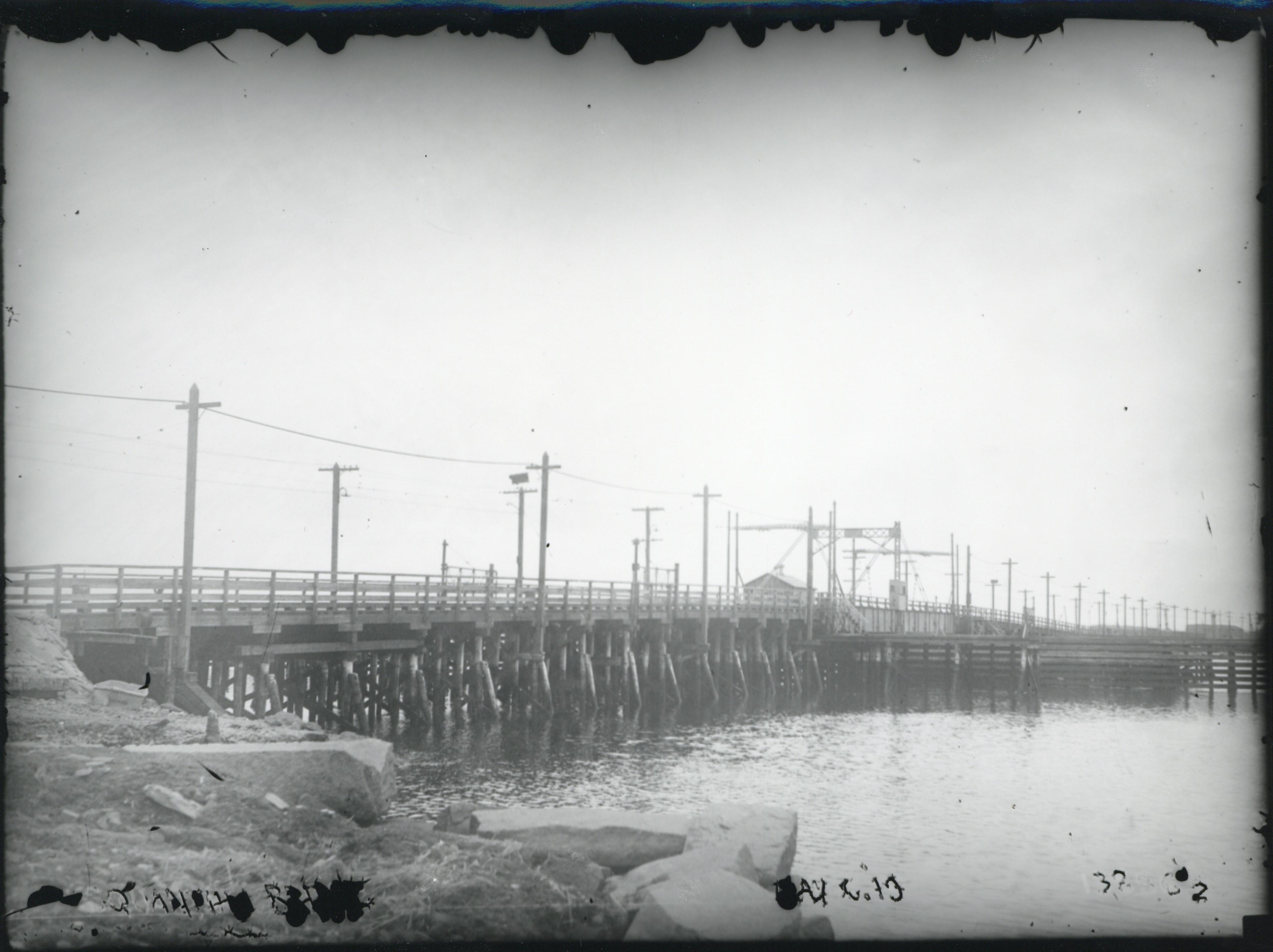
A wooden bridge from Dorchester to Squantum, constructed in 1917 to allow Boston Elevated Railway streetcars to bring employees to the plant

The Victory Destroyer Plant was a United States Naval Shipbuilding yard operational from 1918 to 1920 in Quincy, Massachusetts. It was then reused as a civil airport, and later Naval Air Station Squantum. It was owned by the Bethlehem Shipbuilding Corporation, and was constructed in order to relieve destroyer construction at the nearby Fore River Shipyard. Still later in the late 1920s it was used to build yachts by the firm Lamb & O'Connell. One of these yachts, the US10 Tipler III, a 30-square-meter racing yacht, participated in the 1929 International Races sponsored by the Corinthian Yacht Club of Marblehead.

== Ships Constructed ==
Hull no.	Ship name	Commissioned	Decommissioned	Fate	Service notes
DD261	Delphy	30 November 1918	26 October 1923	Wrecked	in the Honda Point disaster 8 September 1923
DD262	McDermut	27 March 1919	22 May 1929	Scrapped	London Naval Treaty
DD263	Laub	17 March 1919	8 October 1940	Transferred	Destroyers for Bases Agreement
DD264	McLanahan	5 April 1919	8 October 1940	Transferred	Destroyers for Bases Agreement
DD265	Edwards	24 April 1919	8 October 1940	Transferred	Destroyers for Bases Agreement
DD266	Greene	9 May 1919	23 November 1945	Wrecked	in a typhoon, struck 1945
DD267	Ballard	5 June 1919	5 December 1945	Scrapped	1946
DD268	Shubrick	3 July 1919	26 November 1940	Transferred	Destroyers for Bases Agreement
DD269	Bailey	27 June 1919	26 November 1940	Transferred	Destroyers for Bases Agreement
DD270	Thornton	15 July 1919	2 May 1945	Abandoned	Donated to Ryukyu Islands 1957
DD271	Morris	21 July 1919	15 June 1922	Scrapped	1936
DD272	Tingey	25 July 1919	24 May 1922	Scrapped	1936
DD273	Swasey	8 August 1919	10 June 1922	Transferred	Destroyers for Bases Agreement
DD274	Meade	8 September 1919	18 December 1939	Transferred	Destroyers for Bases Agreement
DD275	Sinclair	8 October 1919	1 June 1929	Scrapped	1935
DD276	McCawley	22 September 1919	1 April 1930	Scrapped	London Naval Treaty
DD277	Moody	10 December 1919	2 June 1930	Sold	Sold to Metro-Goldwyn-Mayer in 1931 for making of World War I film Hell Below. DD-277 was made up to look like a German World War I destroyer and was sunk in 1933 by studio demolitions.
DD278	Henshaw	10 December 1919	11 March 1930	Scrapped	London Naval Treaty
DD279	Meyer	17 December 1919	15 May 1929	Scrapped	London Naval Treaty
DD280	Doyen	17 December 1919	25 February 1930	Scrapped	London Naval Treaty
DD281	Sharkey	28 November 1919	1 May 1930	Scrapped	London Naval Treaty
DD282	Toucey	9 December 1919	1 May 1930	Scrapped	London Naval Treaty
DD283	Breck	1 December 1919	1 May 1930	Scrapped	London Naval Treaty
DD284	Isherwood	4 December 1919	1 May 1930	Scrapped	London Naval Treaty
DD285	Case	8 December 1919	22 October 1930	Scrapped	London Naval Treaty
DD286	Lardner	10 December 1919	1 May 1930	Scrapped	London Naval Treaty
DD287	Putnam	18 December 1919	21 September 1929	Sold	converted to banana boat Teapa
DD288	Worden	24 February 1920	1 May 1930	Sold	converted to banana boat Tabasco
DD289	Flusser	25 February 1920	1 May 1930	Scrapped	London Naval Treaty
DD290	Dale	16 February 1920	1 May 1930	Sold	converted to banana boat Masaya
DD291	Converse	28 April 1920	1 May 1930	Scrapped	London Naval Treaty
DD292	Reid	3 December 1919	1 May 1930	Scrapped	London Naval Treaty
DD293	Billingsley	1 March 1920	1 May 1930	Scrapped	London Naval Treaty
DD294	Charles Ausburn	23 March 1920	1 May 1930	Scrapped	London Naval Treaty
DD295	Osborne	17 May 1920	1 May 1930	Sold	converted to banana boat Matagalpa
