= USS Worden (DD-288) =

Clemson-class destroyer

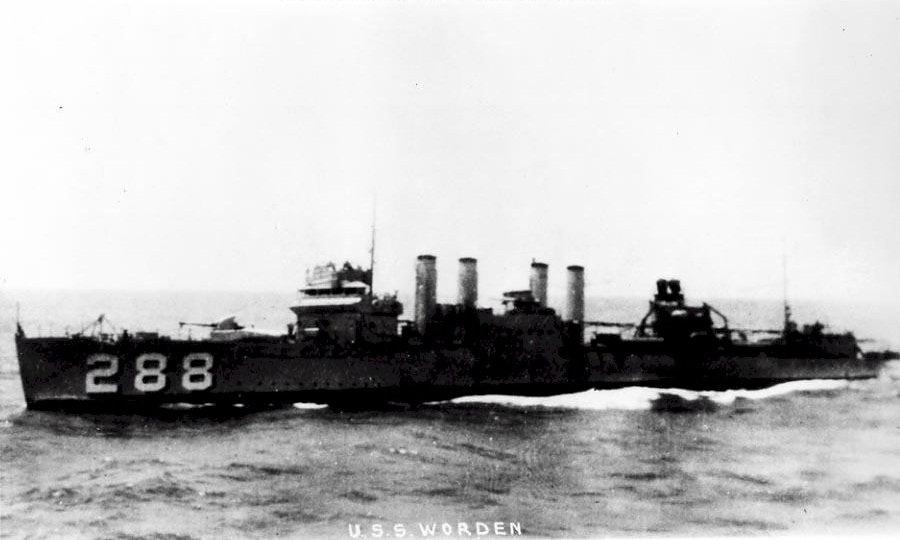
- USS Worden (DD-288)

History

United States
- Namesake: John Lorimer Worden
- Builder: Bethlehem Shipbuilding Corporation, Squantum Victory Yard
- Laid down: 30 June 1919
- Launched: 24 October 1919
- Commissioned: 24 February 1920
- Decommissioned: 1 May 1930
- Stricken: 22 October 1930
- Fate: Sold for scrapping, 17 January 1931

General characteristics
- Class & type: Clemson-class destroyer
- Displacement: 1,215 tons
- Length: 314 feet 4 1/2 inches (95.822 m)
- Beam: 30 feet 11 1/2 inches (9.436 m)
- Draft: 9 feet 9 3/4 inches (2.991 m)
- Propulsion: 26,500 shp (20 MW); geared turbines, 2 screws
- Speed: 35 knots (65 km/h)
- Range: 4,900 nmi (9,100 km); @ 15-knot (28 km/h)
- Complement: 120 officers and enlisted
- Armament: 4 × 4 in (102 mm)/50 guns, 1 × 3 in (76 mm)/25 gun, 12 × 21 inch (533 mm) torpedo tubes

The second USS Worden (DD-288) was a Clemson-class destroyer in the United States Navy following World War I. She was named for John Lorimer Worden.

== History ==
Worden was laid down on 30 June 1919 at Squantum, Massachusetts, by the Bethlehem Shipbuilding Corporation; launched on 24 October 1919; sponsored by Mrs. Emilie Neilson Worden; and commissioned on 24 February 1920 at the Boston Navy Yard.

The destroyer spent the first four years of her decade of active service in operations along the Atlantic coast of the United States. After fitting out, she departed Boston loaded torpedoes and spare parts at Newport, Rhode Island, and embarked upon her shakedown cruise to Key West and Cuban waters. She completed that voyage at New York on 1 May and joined Destroyer Division 42, 3d Squadron, Atlantic Fleet. From May to July, she conducted operations along the length of the Atlantic seaboard, from Key West to Newport. On 21 July, she arrived in Charleston and remained there until the following summer. On 25 June 1921, she departed Charleston, South Carolina for a 4 July visit to New York and gunnery practice off Block Island. In August, she made a voyage to Guantanamo Bay, Cuba, with Naval Academy midshipmen embarked, returning them to Annapolis, Maryland, on the 22nd.

Worden stopped briefly at Hampton Roads, then headed via New York to Boston for repairs at the navy yard which she completed early in November. On the 16th, she loaded torpedoes at Newport and headed south to Charleston, where she arrived on the 18th. She remained there until the spring of 1922. On 29 May of that year, she got underway for a voyage which took her up the coast to Philadelphia; thence to Yorktown, Virginia, a temporary base for battle practice and gunnery drills. Late in July, Worden made a brief cruise to New York and then returned to the southern drill grounds located off the Virginia capes.

During August, September, and October, she conducted battle practice off the capes, departing the area periodically for visits to New York; Beaufort, North Carolina; and Newport. On 21 November, the destroyer entered port at Boston for a repair period which lasted until the end of 1922. Shen then left Boston and loaded torpedoes at Newport on New Year's Day 1923. On 5 January, she arrived at Lynnhaven Roads, Virginia, but, soon thereafter, continued south to Guantanamo Bay, Cuba, where she resumed gun and torpedo drills through the end of the month. On 12 February, she transited the Panama Canal with the Scouting Fleet for Fleet Problem I, the first set of combined maneuvers with Battle Fleet, conducted in the Gulf of Panama. She retransited the canal on 27 March and resumed training in the Guantanamo Bay area until late April.

After visits to several gulf coast ports (Galveston, Texas, New Orleans, Louisiana, Tampa, Florida and Key West) she returned to Newport on 15 May. Early in June, she visited Washington, D.C., and, by mid-month, had entered the Philadelphia Navy Yard for repairs. Worden left Philadelphia on 12 October and resumed gunnery drills and battle practice at the southern drill grounds off the Virginia capes. Those drills, punctuated by visits to Fall River, Massachusetts, and to Baltimore, Maryland, occupied her time until mid-November, at which time she entered the Philadelphia Navy Yard for repairs to a ruptured boiler.

On 3 January 1924, Worden departed Philadelphia and, after a brief stop at Lynnhaven Roads, rendezvoused with Scouting Fleet as a unit of its screen. Conducting drills and exercises along the way, Scouting Fleet headed for Colón, Panama, where the warships refueled before continuing on to Culebra Island with the combined United States Fleet (Scouting Fleet and Battle Fleet). Worden participated in the annual spring exercises in the West Indies until late spring. On 4 May, she arrived back in Philadelphia to prepare for her first and only deployment outside the western hemisphere. After a brief repair period at Boston and a visit to Newport, under the command of Commander Allen B. Reed she headed across the Atlantic in mid-June. On the 27th, she passed through the Strait of Gibraltar to begin a year of duty with the United States Naval Forces Europe. During the early portion of that tour, Worden called at Palermo, Sicily, and then headed for the Adriatic Sea.

Her tour in the Adriatic was probably influenced by the murder of two Americans in the newly established state of Albania and the internal strife which followed and which resulted in the ousting of prime minister Ahmed Zogu and his temporary replacement by a provisional government under Fan S. Noli. During her stay in the Adriatic, Worden visited Pula (now Croatia) and Venice in Italy and Split (now Croatia) in Kingdom of Yugoslavia as well as Durrës in troubled Albania.

Later in the year, the destroyer left the Mediterranean for visits to Gravesend, England, Cherbourg, France, Leith, Scotland and Amsterdam in the Netherlands. At the conclusion of that circuit, she returned to the Mediterranean and continued her tour of duty with Naval Forces, Europe, until the summer of 1925.

She returned to New York on 16 July of that year and resumed her former schedule of operations with the Scouting Fleet. On 13 September, she entered the Philadelphia Navy Yard for repairs. The destroyer did not leave the yard until December. On the 7th, she headed south to join in the annual winter maneuvers held in the West Indies and in Panama Bay on the Pacific side of the isthmus. Scouting Fleet transited the canal on 4 and 5 February 1926 to join Battle Fleet for Fleet Problem VI in Panama Bay. In March, Worden returned to the Caribbean with Scouting Fleet and resumed battle practice, gunnery drills, and torpedo exercises in the West Indies. She completed that phase of her 1926 training schedule late in the spring and arrived back in Philadelphia on 5 May. During the early part of the summer, the warship continued her training schedule, this time off the New England coast near Narragansett Bay. On 2 July, she entered the Philadelphia Navy Yard for a three-month repair period.

On 11 October, Worden stood out of Philadelphia on her way south once more. After a brief stop at Hampton Roads, the destroyer continued on her way and arrived in Guantanamo Bay, Cuba, on the 16th. For the next month, she conducted engineering trials and battle practice near Haiti in the Gulf of Gonâve. Returning north in mid-November, she visited the Naval Academy for a time before heading back to Philadelphia where she arrived on 15 December. The warship bade farewell to Philadelphia once again on 5 January 1927 and pointed her bow southward for a stop at Yorktown followed by the 1927 edition of the annual winter maneuvers. She reached Guantanamo Bay on 12 January and commenced gunnery and battle practice with Scouting Fleet in preparation for the annual Fleet problem.

In contrast to the previous fleet problems in which she had participated, Fleet Problem VII brought Battle Fleet to the Caribbean instead of taking Scouting Fleet to the Pacific. The exercise was staged in March; and, by late April, Worden had returned north, this time to New York City. During the summer of 1927, she conducted normal training exercises off the Atlantic coast and participated in the Fleet Review conducted off Cape Henry, Virginia, in June for President Calvin Coolidge. On 11 September, she entered the Philadelphia Navy Yard and remained there for the rest of the year.

On 7 January 1928, she started south from Philadelphia. This time, however, she participated only in the preliminary drills and exercises for the annual fleet problem. She headed back to Philadelphia in April and arrived there on the 14th. Meanwhile, Scouting Fleet and Battle Fleet joined and executed Fleet Problem VIII in the broad expanse of the Pacific between San Francisco, and the Hawaiian Islands. A month later, Worden returned to sea for her usual round of operations along the Atlantic seaboard. That duty lasted until late in October at which time her base of operations changed to Charleston. Local operations out of that port occupied her time until early December when she returned north to Philadelphia for a month. In January 1929, she moved to Norfolk for repairs to her turbines; and, after post-repair trials in the Chesapeake Bay in February, she headed south for winter maneuvers. The destroyer arrived at Guantanamo Bay on 28 February. She concluded her part in those exercises later in the spring and returned north, arriving in New York on 2 May.

During the summer, she conducted normal operations along the northeastern coast.

== Fate ==
On 21 September, Worden arrived in Philadelphia. The warship remained there until she was decommissioned on 1 May 1930. Her name was struck from the Navy list on 22 October 1930, and she was sold for scrapping on 17 January 1931 according to the Dictionary of American Naval Fighting Ships. Other sources state she was converted into an express fruit carrier MV Tabasco

== Bibliography ==
- Rau, William M. (1990). "Question 47/88". Warship International. XXVII (4): 423. ISSN 0043-0374.
