= USS Iris (1885) =

Tender of the United States Navy

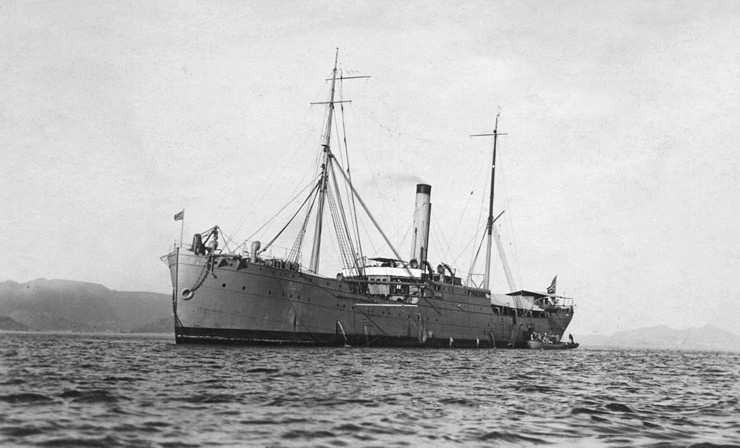
- USS Iris off the coast of Guaymas, Mexico, 1915.

History

United States
- Name: USS Iris
- Namesake: Iris
- Builder: A. Leslie and Company, Newcastle upon Tyne, England
- Launched: 1885
- Acquired: 25 May 1898
- Commissioned: 1 August 1898
- Decommissioned: 2 May 1916
- Fate: Transferred to the United States Shipping Board, 3 May 1917

General characteristics
- Type: Screw steamer
- Displacement: 1,923 long tons (1,954 t)
- Length: 321 ft (98 m)
- Beam: 39 ft (12 m)
- Draft: 24 ft (7.3 m)
- Speed: 10 knots (19 km/h; 12 mph)
- Complement: 124
- Armament: None

USS Iris was a ship of the United States Navy which served in the Pacific in a variety of roles from 1899 until 1916. Originally fitted out as a distilling ship, she served as a general utility ship, then as a collier, before being refitted as a torpedo boat tender.

== Service history ==
The ship was built in 1885 by A. Leslie and Company, Newcastle, England, and was purchased by the United States Navy from the Miami Steamship Co. on 25 May 1898 for service in the Spanish–American War. However, reconditioning and conversion to a water distilling ship was not completed until after the end of active operations against Spain. Iris was commissioned at Norfolk Navy Yard on 1 August 1898.

The ship departed Norfolk on 31 August and arrived at Montauk Point, New York on 5 September. She departed New York Harbor on 14 October for the Philippine Islands, arriving at Manila on 18 March 1899. She acted as a general utility ship for the Asiatic Squadron in the Philippines during the occupation of the islands and during the subsequent insurrection. Crewmembers serving on Iris during any of the periods 18 March to 16 November 1899; 14 December 1899 to 16 January 1900; 31 May to 21 June 1900; 1 August 1900 to 27 April 1901 or 18 July 1901 to 4 July 1902 qualified for award of the Philippine Campaign Medal.

Iris was decommissioned for repairs at Hong Kong on 31 January 1900, and resumed duty in May under the command of Lieutenant Dudley Wright Knox USN through June 1901. During this time, Iris returned to duty in the Philippines during the insurrection and also served in the Boxer Rebellion. Crewmembers serving on her between 29 June to 24 July 1900 qualified for award of the China Relief Expedition Medal.

Iris sailed for home in late 1903, arriving at San Francisco on 13 November and decommissioned at Mare Island Navy Yard on 18 December. She was overhauled there and was placed in service as a collier for the Asiatic Squadron. For the next five years, she fueled United States vessels in the Orient.

She departed Manila on 20 May 1909 for San Francisco where she was converted to a torpedo boat tender. She was placed out of service on 15 October and recommissioned the same day. During the following years she served as parent ship for the Pacific Torpedo Fleet operating off the West Coast of the United States.

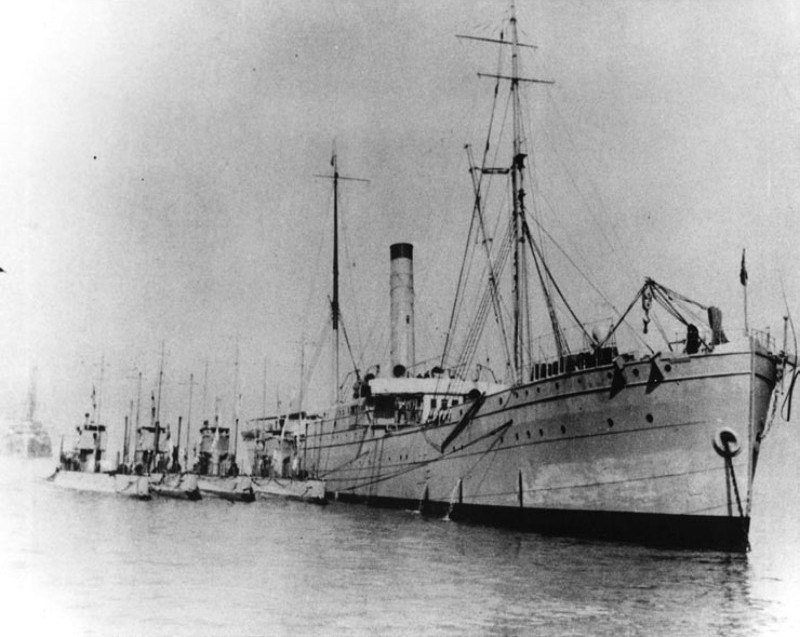
Iris at anchor with four submarines alongside, 1913–16. An armored cruiser is in the background.

In late April 1914, under the command of Lieutenant Allen B. Reed, Iris along with five torpedo boats from the Pacific Fleet Torpedo Flotilla, were ordered to the Gulf of California, also known as the Sea of Cortez following the Tampico Affair. They patrolled the vicinity of La Paz and Mazatlan, Mexico, during the ongoing civil unrest there. During May and June 1914, Iris evacuated American citizen refugees from Mazatlan and Acapulco, including the American consul, Hon. Clement S. Edwards. On 19 June, Iris departed Mazatlan for La Paz, Mexico. Iris departed La Paz for San Diego on 28 August. After arriving back to San Diego, Iris spent the next few months on regular patrol duty with the torpedo ships in her squadron, primarily operating off the coast of California between San Pedro and San Diego. Crewmembers serving on Iris during the period 29 April to 20 May 1914 or 4 to 12 June 1914 qualified for award of the Mexican Service Medal.

In late 1915 disorder in Mexico again threatened American citizens and interests. Iris arrived Topolobampo, Mexico on 9 December to begin patrol duty on the Mexican coast. She remained in the area ready to act in the event of any emergency until departing La Paz on 30 January 1916. She arrived back at San Diego, California, on 4 February and began duty towing targets off southern California.

Two months later Iris was ordered to San Francisco. After arriving on 16 April, she was decommissioned at Mare Island on 2 May 1916. Iris was transferred to the United States Shipping Board on 3 May 1917.

== Campaigns ==
Philippine Campaign Medal	China Relief Expedition Medal	Mexican Service Medal
