= USS Converse (DD-291) =

Clemson-class destroyer

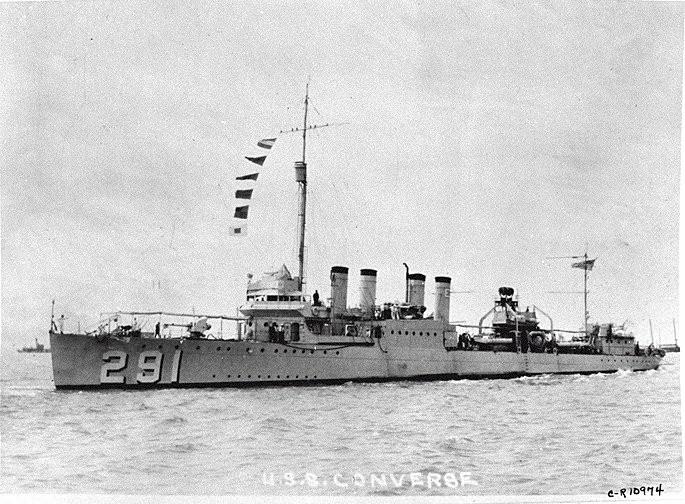
- USS Converse (DD-291)

History

United States
- Namesake: George A. Converse
- Builder: Bethlehem Shipbuilding Corporation, Squantum Victory Yard
- Laid down: 13 August 1919
- Launched: 28 November 1919
- Commissioned: 28 April 1920
- Decommissioned: 1 May 1930
- Stricken: 17 January 1931
- Fate: Sold for scrapping, 17 January 1931

General characteristics
- Class & type: Clemson-class destroyer
- Displacement: 1,290 long tons (1,311 t) (standard); 1,389 long tons (1,411 t) (deep load)
- Length: 314 ft 4 in (95.8 m)
- Beam: 30 ft 11 in (9.42 m)
- Draught: 10 ft 3 in (3.1 m)
- Installed power: 27,000 shp (20,000 kW); 4 water-tube boilers
- Propulsion: 2 shafts, 2 steam turbines
- Speed: 35 knots (65 km/h; 40 mph) (design)
- Range: 2,500 nautical miles (4,600 km; 2,900 mi) at 20 knots (37 km/h; 23 mph) (design)
- Complement: 6 officers, 108 enlisted men
- Armament: 4 × single 4-inch (102 mm) guns; 2 × single 1-pounder AA guns or; 2 × single 3-inch (76 mm) guns; 4 × triple 21 inch (533 mm) torpedo tubes; 2 × depth charge rails

USS Converse (DD-291) was a Clemson-class destroyer built for the United States Navy during World War I.

== Description ==
The Clemson class was a repeat of the preceding Wickes class although more fuel capacity was added. The ships displaced 1,290 long tons (1,311 t) at standard load and 1,389 long tons (1,411 t) at deep load. They had an overall length of 314 feet 4 inches (95.8 m), a beam of 30 feet 11 inches (9.4 m) and a draught of 10 feet 3 inches (3.1 m). They had a crew of 6 officers and 108 enlisted men.

Performance differed radically between the ships of the class, often due to poor workmanship. The Clemson class was powered by two steam turbines, each driving one propeller shaft, using steam provided by four water-tube boilers. The turbines were designed to produce a total of 27,000 shaft horsepower (20,000 kW) intended to reach a speed of 35 knots (65 km/h; 40 mph). The ships carried a maximum of 371 long tons (377 t) of fuel oil which was intended gave them a range of 2,500 nautical miles (4,600 km; 2,900 mi) at 20 knots (37 km/h; 23 mph).

The ships were armed with four 4-inch (102 mm) guns in single mounts and were fitted with two 1-pounder guns for anti-aircraft defense. In many ships a shortage of 1-pounders caused them to be replaced by 3-inch (76 mm) guns. Their primary weapon, though, was their torpedo battery of a dozen 21 inch (533 mm) torpedo tubes in four triple mounts. They also carried a pair of depth charge rails. A "Y-gun" depth charge thrower was added to many ships.

== Construction and career ==
Converse named for George A. Converse, was launched 28 November 1919 by Bethlehem Shipbuilding Corporation, Squantum, Massachusetts; sponsored by Miss E. C. Colt; commissioned 28 April 1920 and reported to the Atlantic Fleet. Converse was placed in reserve status 11 June 1920 operating in New England waters with 50 percent of her complement on training cruises for members of the Naval Reserve.

After testing the Arma gyro compass, Converse operated from 15 November 1921 with Scouting Fleet. Returned to full commission 1 July 1922, she cruised on the east coast and in Caribbean waters. Converse sailed from Newport, Rhode Island 18 June 1924 to join U.S. Naval Forces in European Waters, visiting Antwerp, Amsterdam, Cherbourg and Southampton before returning to New York 16 July 1925.

In 1926 and 1927 Converse again served as training ship for the Naval Reserve making two cruises each summer to Newport and the Caribbean. From 23 February 1927 she tested the Flettner rudder during her cruising. In 1928 Converse was designated as Experimental Ship, Scouting Fleet. She made test runs for the Bureau of Engineering in the Potomac River and Chesapeake Bay, then fired experimental torpedoes at Newport and Charleston, South Carolina. She rejoined her squadron at Norfolk, Virginia 4 January 1929 for regular operations until decommissioned at Philadelphia 1 May 1930. She was sold 17 January 1931 to be scrapped in accordance with the London Naval Treaty which called for the limitation and reduction of naval armaments.
