= USS McCawley (DD-276) =

Clemson-class destroyer

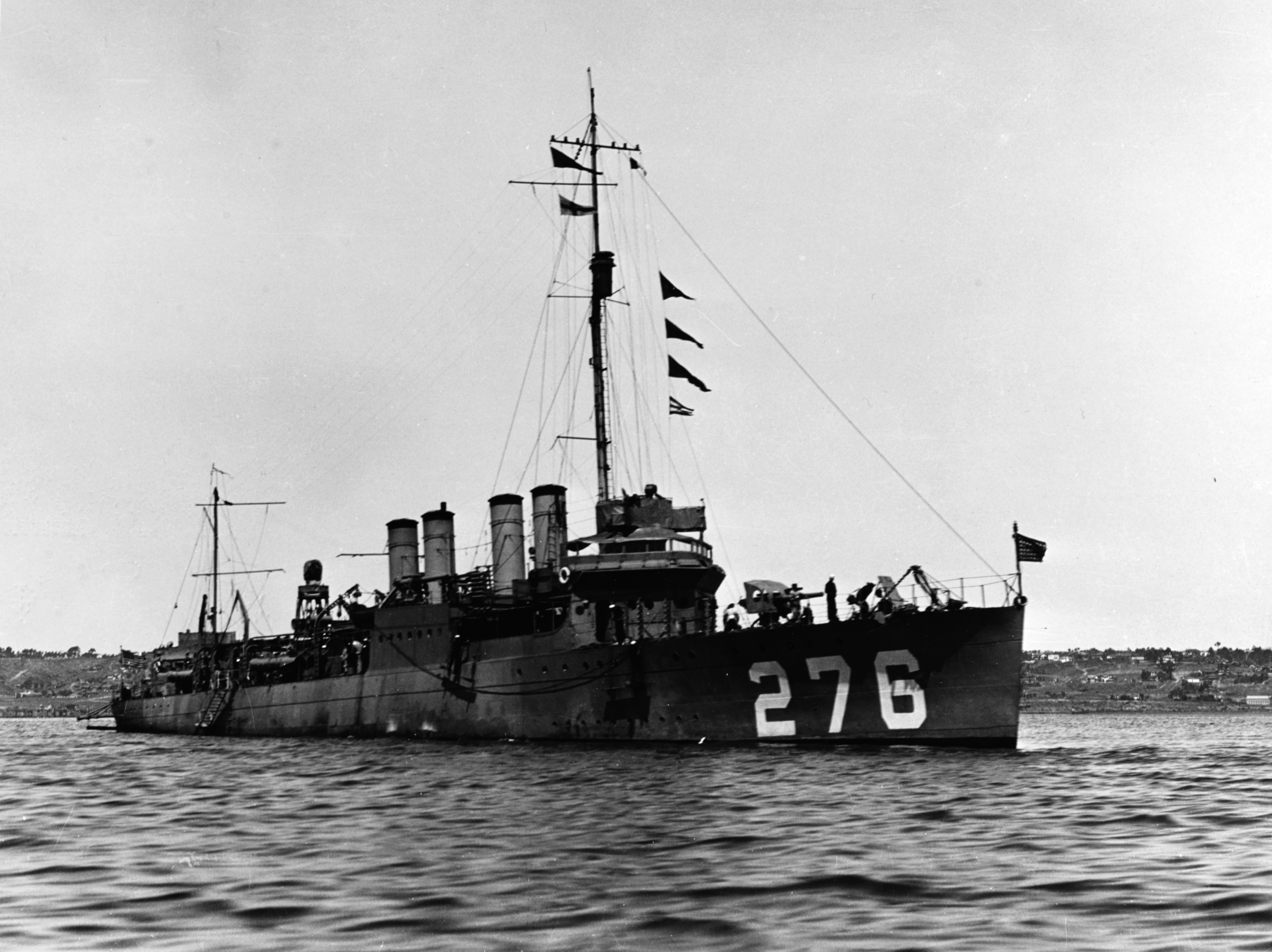
- USS McCawley (DD-276), at anchor during the early 1920s.

History

United States
- Name: McCawley
- Namesake: Charles McCawley
- Builder: Bethlehem Shipbuilding Corporation, Squantum Victory Yard
- Laid down: 5 November 1918
- Launched: 14 June 1919
- Commissioned: 22 September 1919
- Decommissioned: 1 April 1930
- Stricken: 13 August 1930
- Identification: Hull symbol:DD-276; Code letters:NULS
- Fate: Sold for scrap, 2 September 1931

General characteristics
- Class & type: Clemson-class destroyer
- Displacement: 1,290 long tons (1,311 t) (standard); 1,389 long tons (1,411 t) (deep load)
- Length: 314 ft 4 in (95.8 m)
- Beam: 30 ft 11 in (9.42 m)
- Draught: 10 ft 3 in (3.1 m)
- Installed power: 27,000 shp (20,000 kW); 4 water-tube boilers
- Propulsion: 2 shafts, 2 steam turbines
- Speed: 35 knots (65 km/h; 40 mph) (design)
- Range: 2,500 nautical miles (4,600 km; 2,900 mi) at 20 knots (37 km/h; 23 mph) (design)
- Complement: 6 officers, 108 enlisted men
- Armament: 4 × single 4-inch (102 mm) guns; 2 × single 1-pounder AA guns or; 2 × single 3-inch (76 mm) guns; 4 × triple 21 inch (533 mm) torpedo tubes; 2 × depth charge rails

USS McCawley (DD-276) was a Clemson-class destroyer built for the United States Navy during World War I. She was armed with 4 × 4 inch and 2 × 1 pounder guns. She was commissioned on 22 September 1919, served with the Pacific Fleet for 3 years and was laid up on 7 June 1922. McCawley was recommissioned on 27 September 1923, again serving in the Pacific, and decommissioned in 1930 before being sold for scrap.

== Description ==
The Clemson class was a repeat of the preceding Wickes class although more fuel capacity was added. The ships displaced 1,290 long tons (1,311 t) at standard load and 1,389 long tons (1,411 t) at deep load. They had an overall length of 314 feet 4 inches (95.8 m), a beam of 30 feet 11 inches (9.4 m) and a draught of 10 feet 3 inches (3.1 m). They had a crew of 6 officers and 108 enlisted men.

Performance differed radically between the ships of the class, often due to poor workmanship. The Clemson class was powered by two steam turbines, each driving one propeller shaft, using steam provided by four water-tube boilers. The turbines were designed to produce a total of 27,000 shaft horsepower (20,000 kW) intended to reach a speed of 35 knots (65 km/h; 40 mph). The ships carried a maximum of 371 long tons (377 t) of fuel oil which was intended gave them a range of 2,500 nautical miles (4,600 km; 2,900 mi) at 20 knots (37 km/h; 23 mph).

The ships were armed with four 4-inch (102 mm) guns in single mounts and were fitted with two 1-pounder guns for anti-aircraft defense. In many ships a shortage of 1-pounders caused them to be replaced by 3-inch (76 mm) guns. Their primary weapon, though, was their torpedo battery of a dozen 21 inch (533 mm) torpedo tubes in four triple mounts. They also carried a pair of depth charge rails. A "Y-gun" depth charge thrower was added to many ships.

== Commissioning ==
McCawley, named for Colonel Charles McCawley, was laid down 5 November 1918 by the Bethlehem Shipbuilding Corporation's Fore River Shipyard in Quincy, Massachusetts; launched 14 June 1919; sponsored by Miss Eleanor Laurie McCawley, granddaughter of Colonel McCawley; and commissioned 22 September 1919.

== Service history ==
Following an east coast fitting out and shakedown period, McCawley sailed for San Diego, California where she joined Destroyer Squadron 2, later DesRon 4, Pacific Fleet. She participated in local exercises off the west coast until she decommissioned at San Diego 7 June 1922.

On 27 September 1923 McCawley was recommissioned and again assigned to the Pacific Fleet. For the next 6 years she operated there, taking part in various local, squadron and fleet training exercises. During 1924 and 1927 she steamed to the Caribbean for fleet problems, but otherwise spent the entire period in operations along the west coast, from San Diego to Puget Sound, and in Hawaiian waters.

McCawley was designated for deactivation under the terms of the London Treaty for the Limitation of Naval Armament and decommissioned at San Diego on 1 April 1930. Her name was struck from the Navy list on 13 August 1930 and her hulk was scrapped and sold at auction 2 September 1931.
