= Plankowner =

Crewman on North American military ship

A plankowner (also referred to a plank owner and sometimes a plank holder) is a person who was a member of the crew of a United States Navy ship or United States Coast Guard Cutter when that ship was placed in commission. Originally, this term applied only to crew members that were present at the ship's first commissioning. Today plankowner is often applied to members of newly commissioned units, new military bases and recommissioning crews as well.

== In U.S. military ==
Plankowner is a term used by the United States Navy, and has consequently been variously defined by different units. The origin of the term is the implication that a crew member was around when the ship was being built and commissioned, and therefore has bragging rights to the "ownership" of one of the planks in the main deck.

Historically, a plankowner in the United States Navy and United States Coast Guard, or his widow, could petition the Naval Historical Center's Curator Branch for a piece of the deck when the ship was decommissioned. This practice has been discontinued and stocks of planking that existed at the Curator branch have been donated to various veteran's organizations.

In the United States Navy SEALs, the term refers to the original or "founding" members of a SEAL Team.

== Notes ==
Citations

References cited

- "U.S. Navy Style Guide". Navy.mil website. Archived from the original (asp) on August 7, 2009.
- "Plank Owners, Plank Owner Certificates, and Planking". Naval Historical Center. 2007-05-07. Archived from the original on 2012-09-16.
- Cutler, Deborah W. and Thomas J. Cutler (2005). Dictionary of Naval Terms. Naval Institute Press, Annapolis, Maryland. ISBN 978-1-59114-150-1.
