= USS Antigone (ID-3007) =

U.S. Navy transport vessel

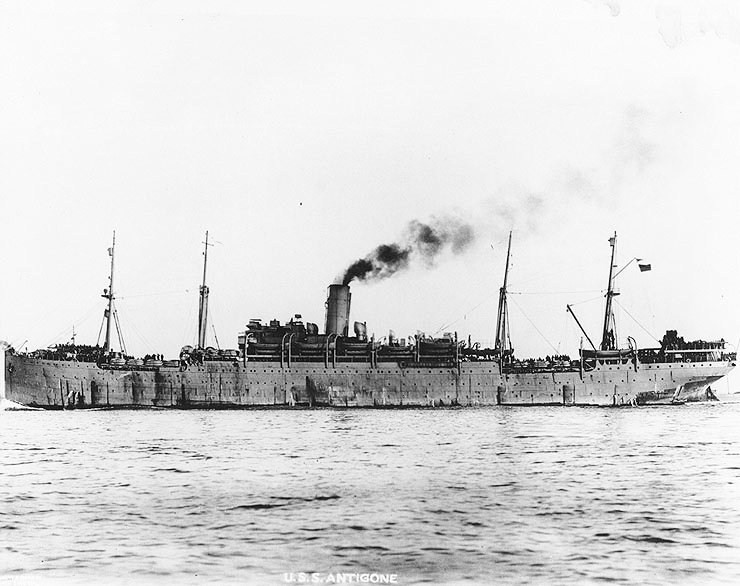
- USS Antigone (ID-3007) underway with troops aboard

History

German Empire
- Name: Neckar
- Owner: North German Lloyd
- Builder: Joh. C. Tecklenborg, Geestemünde
- Yard number: 172
- Launched: 8 December 1900
- Renamed: Antigone, 1 September 1917

History

United States
- Name: USS Antigone
- Namesake: Antigone
- Acquired: 12 July 1917
- Commissioned: 5 September 1917
- Decommissioned: 24 September 1919
- Renamed: Potomac, 5 May 1921
- Stricken: 24 September 1919

General characteristics
- Tonnage: 9,835 GRT; 6,200 NRT
- Displacement: 17,024 tons
- Length: 518 ft 1 in (157.91 m) overall; 499.5 ft (152.2 m) registered
- Beam: 58.1 ft (17.7 m)
- Draft: 27 ft (8.2 m)
- Depth: 37.0 ft (11.3 m)
- Decks: 3
- Installed power: 726 NHP
- Propulsion: 2 × quadruple-expansion engines; 2 × screws
- Speed: 14 knots (26 km/h)
- Complement: 389
- Armament: 4 × 5-inch/51-caliber guns; 2 × 1-pounder guns; 2 × machine guns

USS Antigone (ID-3007) was a transport for the United States Navy during World War I, and the first ship of that name for the US Navy. She was originally Neckar for Norddeutscher Lloyd from her 1900 launch until seized by the US in 1917. After her war service she was Potomac for United States Lines.

== Neckar ==
Neckar was launched on 8 December 1900 at Geestemünde, Germany, by Joh. C. Tecklenborg and was owned and operated by North German Lloyd. Neckar was 499.5 feet (152.2 m) long, had twin screws and quadruple expansion engines. During 1900–1914, she was the third largest transporter of steerage passengers (nearly all immigrants) to the United States, most of whom disembarked in New York and Baltimore. In the North Atlantic at the outbreak of World War I in the summer of 1914, the passenger and freight liner sought sanctuary at the neutral port, Baltimore, Maryland — lest she fall prey to the warships of the Royal Navy — and was interned, ostensibly for the duration of the conflict.

== World War I ==
When the United States declared war on Germany in April 1917, American customs agents seized the ship. She was transferred to the Navy by the United States Shipping Board on 12 July 1917; converted for naval service as a troop transport at the Norfolk Navy Yard in Portsmouth, Virginia; renamed Antigone on 1 September 1917; and placed in commission on 5 September 1917.

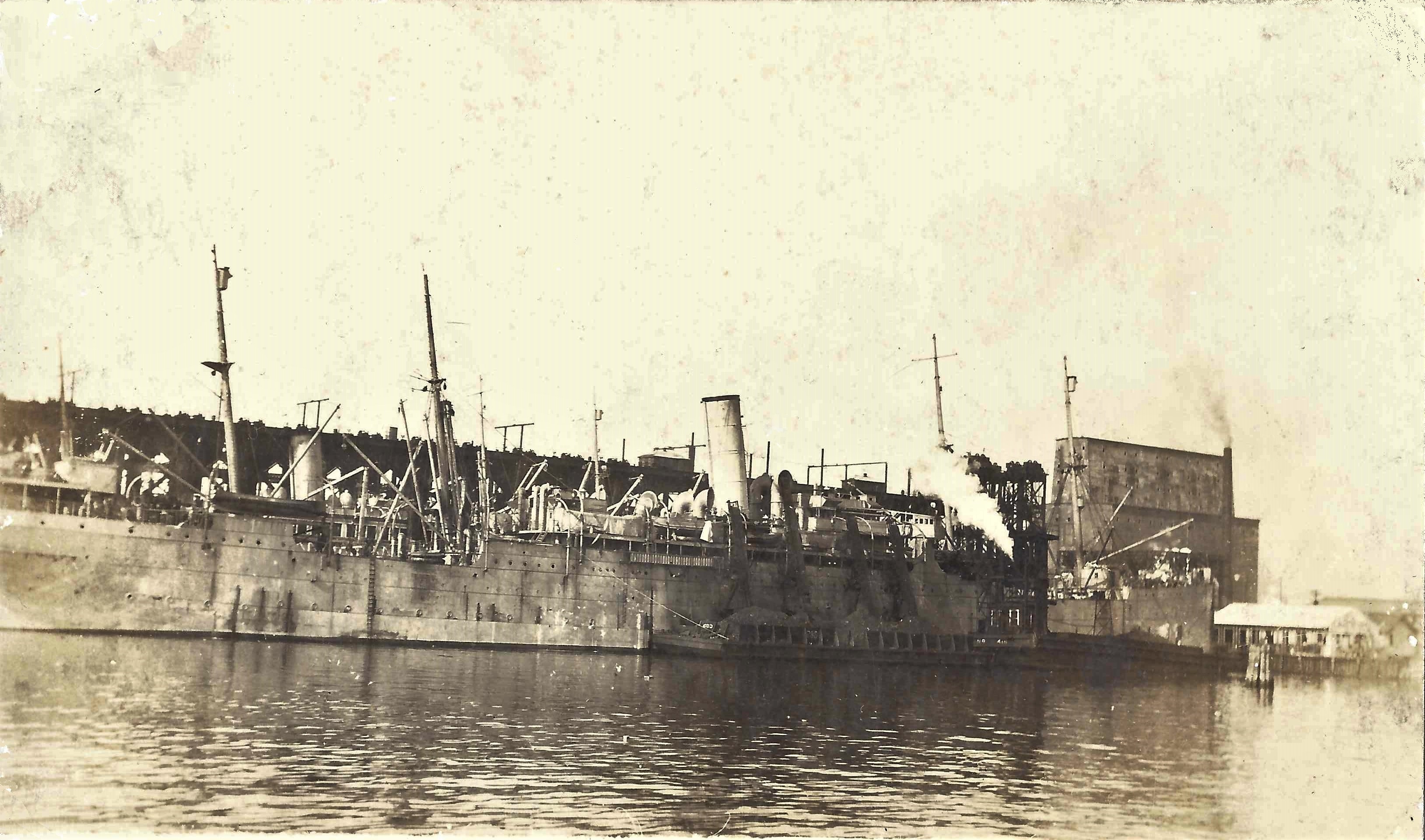
USS Antigone at Newport News, bunkering at the C&O coal pier, 1918

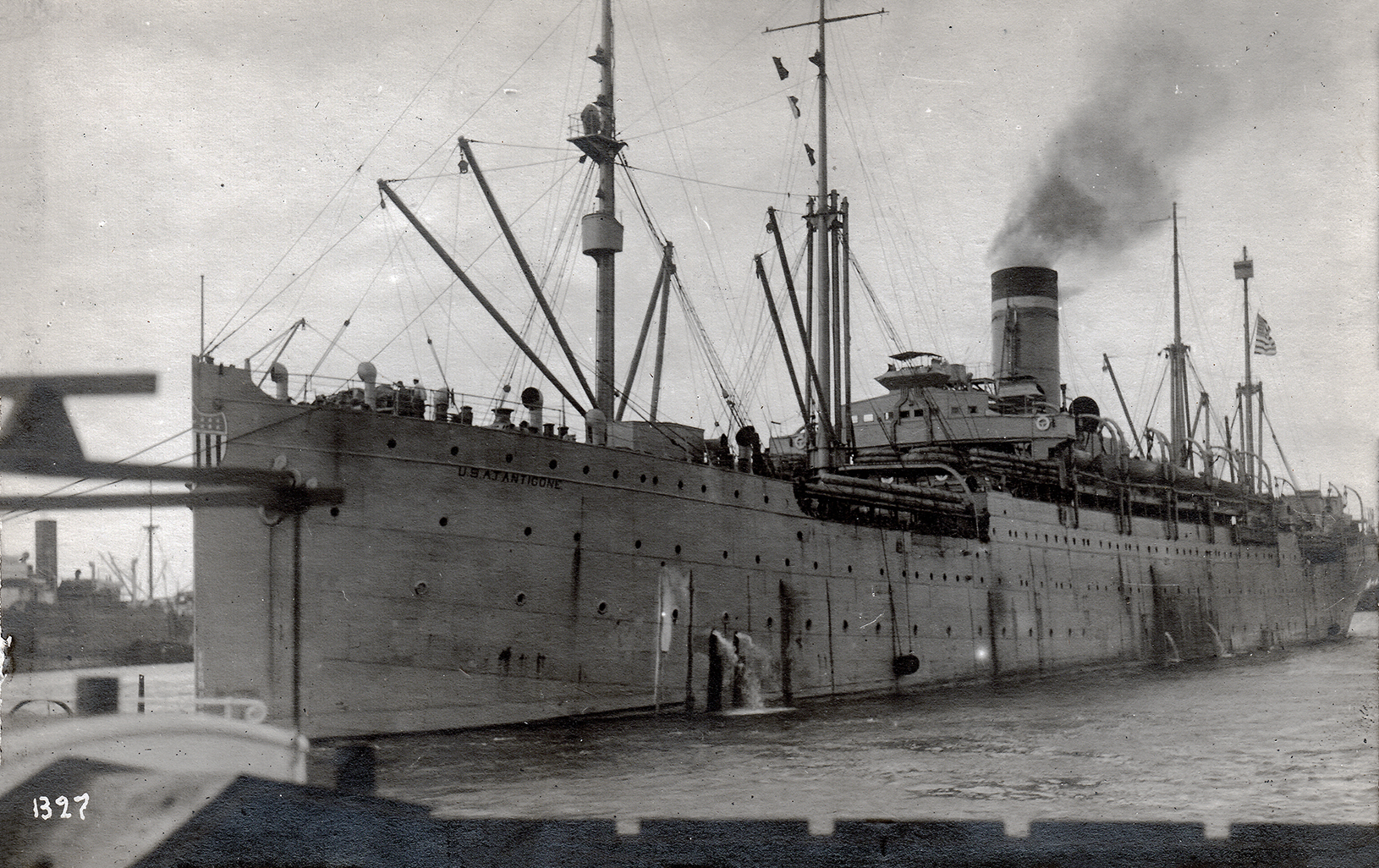
USAT Antigone in Antwerp, 1922(?)

Antigone was assigned to the Cruiser and Transport Force, Atlantic Fleet, on 14 September, and she departed Norfolk on 29 November. After coaling and completing sea trials, she proceeded to Hoboken, New Jersey, and embarked about 2,000 US troops. The transport sailed from New York City en route to France on 14 December and, during the next 11 months, made eight round-trip voyages to France, each of which terminated in either Brest or Saint-Nazaire. The ship also carried medical supplies and general cargo — as well as 16,526 troops — to Europe before hostilities ended.

After the armistice was signed on 11 November 1918, the transport continued her transatlantic voyages and returned more than 22,000 veterans to the United States. She completed her last trip from France upon her arrival at New York City on 15 September 1919. She was decommissioned there on 24 September 1919, and her name was simultaneously struck from the Navy list. The ship was then transferred to the War Department for service in the Army Transport Service.
