= List of Clemson-class destroyers =

The following is a list of Clemson-class destroyers.

== Ships in class ==
The following 156 vessels were built as part of the Clemson-class destroyer line (a further 6 vessels, DD-200 to DD-205 authorized on 6 October 1917, were cancelled on 3 February 1919 without being named). The ships were authorized in the following batches:

1. Hull numbers DD-186–DD-199: authorized 6 October 1917 (contract for 20 ships awarded to Newport News Shipbuilding, but last 6 cancelled)
2. Hull numbers DD-206–DD-230: authorized 6 October 1917 (contract for 25 ships awarded to William Cramp and Sons)
3. Hull numbers DD-231–DD-250: authorized 6 October 1917 (contract for 20 ships awarded to New York Shipbuilding)
4. Hull numbers DD-251–DD-295: authorized 6 October 1917 (contract for 10 ships awarded to Bethlehem, Quincy; and for 35 ships to Bethlehem, Squantum)
5. Hull numbers DD-296–DD-335: authorized 6 October 1917 (contract for 40 ships awarded to Union Iron Works)
6. Hull numbers DD-336–DD-344: authorized 4 March 1917 (contract for 6 ships awarded to Mare Island Navy Yard; and for 3 ships to Norfolk Navy Yard)
7. Hull numbers DD-345–DD-347: authorized 26 April 1917 (contract for 3 ships awarded to Bath Iron Works)

Hull numbers did not exist until 17 July 1920. Prior to the adoption of hull numbers these ships would have been referred to as Destroyer No. ###.

Construction data
Ship name	Hull no.	Builder	Keel laid	Commissioned	Decommissioned	Fate	Service notes
Clemson	DD-186	Newport News Shipbuilding & Dry Dock Company	11 May 1918	29 December 1919 12 July 1940	30 June 1922 12 October 1945	Sold for scrap 21 November 1946	Reclassified AVP-17 (15 November 1939), AVD-4 (6 August 1940), DD-186 (1 December 1943), APD-31 (7 March 1944), DD-186 (17 July 1945)
Dahlgren	DD-187	Newport News Shipbuilding & Dry Dock Company	8 June 1918	6 January 1920 25 October 1932	30 June 1922 14 December 1945	Sold for scrap 17 June 1946	Reclassified AG-91 (1 March 1945)
Goldsborough	DD-188	Newport News Shipbuilding & Dry Dock Company	8 June 1918	26 January 1920 1 July 1940	14 July 1922 11 October 1945	Sold for scrap 21 November 1946	Reclassified AVP-18 (15 November 1939), AVD-5 (2 August 1940), DD-188 (1 December 1943), APD-32 (7 March 1944), DD-188 (10 July 1945)
Semmes	DD-189	Newport News Shipbuilding & Dry Dock Company	10 July 1918	21 February 1920 20 April 1934	17 July 1922 2 June 1946	Sold for scrap 25 November 1946	Commissioned into Coast Guard as CG-20 (25 April 1932-20 April 1934), Reclassified AG-24 (1 July 1935)
Satterlee	DD-190	Newport News Shipbuilding & Dry Dock Company	10 July 1918	23 December 1919 18 December 1939	11 July 1922 8 October 1940	Sunk 31 January 1942	Transferred to Royal Navy as HMS Belmont (8 October 1940), Torpedoed by U-82
Mason	DD-191	Newport News Shipbuilding & Dry Dock Company	10 July 1918	28 February 1920 4 December 1939	31 March 1922 8 October 1940	Sunk 18 October 1941	Transferred to Royal Navy as HMS Broadwater, (8 October 1940), Torpedoed by U-101. Lt. John Stanley Parker, RNVR was the first American killed in action whilst serving with the Royal Navy.
Graham	DD-192	Newport News Shipbuilding & Dry Dock Company	7 September 1918	13 March 1920	31 March 1922	Sold for scrap 19 September 1922	
Abel P. Upshur	DD-193	Newport News Shipbuilding & Dry Dock Company	20 August 1918	23 December 1920 4 December 1939	7 August 1922 9 September 1940	Sold for scrap by RN 1947	Commissioned into Coast Guard as CG-15 (5 November 1930-21 May 1934), Transferred to Royal Navy as HMS Clare (9 September 1940)
Hunt	DD-194	Newport News Shipbuilding & Dry Dock Company	20 August 1918	30 September 1920 December 1939	11 August 1922 8 October 1940	Sold for scrap by RN 1947	Commissioned into Coast Guard as CG-18 (13 September 1930-28 May 1934), Transferred to Royal Navy as HMS Broadway (8 October 1940)
Welborn C. Wood	DD-195	Newport News Shipbuilding & Dry Dock Company	24 September 1918	14 January 1921 4 September 1939	8 August 1922 9 September 1940	Sold for scrap by RN 1947	Commissioned into Coast Guard as CG-19 (1 October 1930-21 May 1934), Transferred to Royal Navy as HMS Chesterfield (9 September 1940)
George E. Badger	DD-196	Newport News Shipbuilding & Dry Dock Company	24 September 1918	28 July 1920 8 January 1940	11 August 1922 3 October 1945	Sold for scrap 3 June 1946	Commissioned into Coast Guard as CG-16 (1 October 1930-21 May 1934), Reclassified AVP-16 (1 October 1939), AVD-3 (2 August 1940), APD-33 (19 May 1944), DD-196 (20 July 1945)
Branch	DD-197	Newport News Shipbuilding & Dry Dock Company	25 October 1918	26 July 1920 4 December 1939	11 August 1922 8 October 1940	Sunk 9 April 1943	Transferred to Royal Navy as HMS Beverley (8 October 1940), Torpedoed by U-188
Herndon	DD-198	Newport News Shipbuilding & Dry Dock Company	25 November 1918	14 September 1920 4 December 1939	6 June 1922 9 September 1940	Sunk 16 January 1945	Commissioned into Coast Guard as CG-17 (13 September 1931-28 May 1934), Transferred to Royal Navy as HMS Churchill (9 September 1940), Transferred to Soviet Union as Deyatelnyi (16 July 1944), Torpedoed by U-956.
Dallas	DD-199	Newport News Shipbuilding & Dry Dock Company	25 November 1918	29 October 1920 14 April 1925 25 September 1939	26 June 1922 23 March 1939 28 July 1945	Sold for scrap 30 November 1945	Renamed Alexander Dallas (31 March 1945)
Unnamed	DD-200	Newport News Shipbuilding & Dry Dock Company	Never	Never	Never	Cancelled 3 February 1919	Construction never started
Unnamed	DD-201	Newport News Shipbuilding & Dry Dock Company	Never	Never	Never	Cancelled 3 February 1919	Construction never started
Unnamed	DD-202	Newport News Shipbuilding & Dry Dock Company	Never	Never	Never	Cancelled 3 February 1919	Construction never started
Unnamed	DD-203	Newport News Shipbuilding & Dry Dock Company	Never	Never	Never	Cancelled 3 February 1919	Construction never started
Unnamed	DD-204	Newport News Shipbuilding & Dry Dock Company	Never	Never	Never	Cancelled 3 February 1919	Construction never started
Unnamed	DD-205	Newport News Shipbuilding & Dry Dock Company	Never	Never	Never	Cancelled 3 February 1919	Construction never started
Chandler	DD-206	William Cramp & Sons	19 August 1918	5 September 1919 31 March 1930	20 October 1922 21 November 1945	Sold for scrap 18 November 1946	Reclassified DMS-9 (19 November 1940), AG-108 (5 June 1945)
Southard	DD-207	William Cramp & Sons	18 August 1918	24 September 1919 6 January 1930	7 February 1922 5 December 1945	Wrecked 9 October 1945	Reclassified DMS-10 (19 October 1940), Driven aground by Typhoon Louise, Wreck blown up 14 January 1946.
Hovey	DD-208	William Cramp & Sons	7 September 1918	2 October 1919 20 February 1930	1 February 1923 -----	Sunk 7 January 1945	Reclassified DMS-11 (19 November 1940), Torpedoed by IJN aircraft.
Long	DD-209	William Cramp & Sons	23 September 1918	20 October 1919 29 March 1930	30 December 1922 -----	Sunk 6 January 1945	Reclassified DMS-12 (19 November 1940), Hit by 2 kamikazes.
Broome	DD-210	William Cramp & Sons	8 October 1918	31 October 1919 5 February 1930	30 December 1922 20 May 1946	Sold for scrap 20 November 1946	Reclassified AG-96 (23 May 1945)
Alden	DD-211	William Cramp & Sons	24 October 1918	24 November 1919 8 May 1930	24 January 1923 15 July 1945	Sold for scrap 30 November 1945	
Smith Thompson	DD-212	William Cramp & Sons	14 August 1918	16 August 1919	15 May 1936	Scuttled 25 July 1936	Rammed amidships 14 April 1936 by Whipple (DD-217), Inspection showed the ship not worth repairing.
Barker	DD-213	William Cramp & Sons	30 April 1919	27 December 1919	18 July 1945	Sold for scrap 30 November 1945	
Tracy	DD-214	William Cramp & Sons	30 April 1919	9 March 1920	19 January 1946	Sold for Scrap 16 May 1946	Reclassified DM-19 (30 June 1937)
Borie	DD-215	William Cramp & Sons	30 April 1919	24 March 1920	-----	Scuttled 2 November 1943	Badly damaged in an engagement with U-405 (1 November 1943).
John D. Edwards	DD-216	William Cramp & Sons	21 May 1919	6 April 1920	28 July 1945	Sold for scrap 30 November 1945	
Whipple	DD-217	William Cramp & Sons	12 June 1919	23 April 1920	9 November 1945	Sold for scrap 30 September 1947	Reclassified AG-117 (6 June 1945)
Parrott	DD-218	William Cramp & Sons	23 July 1919	11 May 1920	14 June 1944	Sold for scrap 5 April 1947	Rammed 2 May 1944 by SS John Morton, Inspection showed the ship not worth repairing.
Edsall	DD-219	William Cramp & Sons	15 September 1919	26 November 1920	-----	Sunk 1 March 1942	Sunk by combined IJN air and surface attack
MacLeish	DD-220	William Cramp & Sons	19 August 1919	2 August 1920 25 September 1939	11 March 1938 8 March 1946	Sold for scrap 18 December 1946	Reclassified AG-87 (5 January 1945)
Simpson	DD-221	William Cramp & Sons	9 October 1919	3 November 1920	29 March 1946	Sold for scrap 21 November 1946	Reclassified APD-27 (Cancelled January 1944), AG-97 (23 May 1945)
Bulmer	DD-222	William Cramp & Sons	11 August 1919	16 August 1920	16 August 1946	Sold for scrap 19 February 1947	Reclassified AG-86 (1 December 1944)
McCormick	DD-223	William Cramp & Sons	11 August 1919	30 August 1920	4 October 1945	Sold for scrap 15 December 1946	Reclassified AG-118 (30 June 1945)
Stewart	DD-224	William Cramp & Sons	9 September 1919	15 September 1920 29 October 1945	----- 23 May 1946	Sunk as target 24 May 1946	Damaged in the Battle of Badung Strait (19/20 February 1942), Entered the floating drydock at Surabaya on 22 February 1942, she was inadequately supported and as the dock rose the ship fell off the keel blocks onto her side in 12 feet (3.7 m) of water, bending her propeller shafts and causing further hull damage, subsequently, demolition charges were set off within the ship, a Japanese bomb hit amidships further damaged her, before the port was evacuated on 2 March 1942 and the drydock containing her was scuttled, Raised by IJN February 1943, Commissioned 20 September 1943 as Patrol Boat No. 102, Recovered by USN August 1945, "named" DD-224^{i}
Pope	DD-225	William Cramp & Sons	9 September 1919	27 October 1920	-----	Sunk 1 March 1942	Sunk by combined IJN air and surface attack.
Peary	DD-226	William Cramp & Sons	9 September 1919	22 October 1920	-----	Sunk 19 February 1942	Sunk by IJN air attack.
Pillsbury	DD-227	William Cramp & Sons	23 October 1919	15 December 1920	-----	Sunk 2 March 1942	Sunk by IJN in surface action
Ford	DD-228	William Cramp & Sons	11 November 1919	30 December 1920	2 November 1945	Sold for scrap 5 October 1947	Renamed John D. Ford (17 November 1921), Reclassified AG-119 (July 1945)
Truxtun	DD-229	William Cramp & Sons	3 December 1919	16 February 1921	-----	Wrecked 18 February 1942	Ran aground and broke up "in a howling gale" off Newfoundland
Paul Jones	DD-230	William Cramp & Sons	23 December 1919	19 April 1921	5 November 1945	Sold for scrap 5 October 1947	Reclassified AG-120 (30 June 1945)
Hatfield	DD-231	New York Shipbuilding	10 June 1918	16 April 1920 1 April 1932 25 September 1939	13 January 1931 28 April 1938 13 December 1946	Sold for scrap 5 October 1947	Reclassified AG-84 (30 June 1945)
Brooks	DD-232	New York Shipbuilding	11 June 1918	18 June 1920 18 June 1932 25 April 1939	20 January 1931 2 September 1938 2 August 1945	Sold for scrap 30 January 1946	Reclassified APD-10 (1 December 1942)
Gilmer	DD-233	New York Shipbuilding	25 June 1918	30 April 1920 25 September 1939	31 August 1938 5 February 1946	Sold for scrap 3 December 1946	Reclassified APD-11 (22 January 1943)
Fox	DD-234	New York Shipbuilding	25 June 1918	17 May 1920 1 April 1932 25 September 1939	2 February 1931 16 September 1938 29 November 1945	Sold for scrap 12 November 1946	Reclassified AG-85 (1 October 1944)
Kane	DD-235	New York Shipbuilding	3 July 1918	11 June 1920 1 April 1932 23 September 1939	31 December 1930 28 April 1938 24 January 1946	Sold for scrap 21 June 1946	Reclassified APD-18 (25 March 1943)
Humphreys	DD-236	New York Shipbuilding	31 July 1918	21 July 1920	26 October 1945	Sold for scrap 26 August 1946	
McFarland	DD-237	New York Shipbuilding	31 July 1918	30 September 1920	8 November 1945	Sold for scrap 29 October 1946	Reclassified AVD-14 (2 August 1940), DD-237 (1 December 1943)
James K. Paulding	DD-238	New York Shipbuilding	31 July 1918	29 November 1920	10 February 1931	Sold for scrap 16 March 1939	
Overton	DD-239	New York Shipbuilding	30 October 1918	30 June 1920 1932 26 September 1939	3 February 1931 20 November 1937 30 July 1945	Sold for scrap 30 November 1945	Reclassified APD-23 (21 August 1943)
Sturtevant	DD-240	New York Shipbuilding	23 November 1918	24 September 1920	-----	Sunk 26 April 1942	Struck 3 mines when passing through an American-laid minefield the existence the crew had no knowledge
Childs	DD-241	New York Shipbuilding	19 March 1919	22 October 1920	10 December 1945	Sold for scrap 23 May 1946	Reclassified AVP-14 (1 July 1938), AVD-1 (1 October 1940)
King	DD-242	New York Shipbuilding	28 April 1919	16 December 1920	23 October 1945	Sold for scrap 29 September 1946	
Sands	DD-243	New York Shipbuilding	22 March 1919	10 November 1920	10 October 1945	Sold for scrap 23 May 1946	Reclassified APD-13 (30 October 1942)
Williamson	DD-244	New York Shipbuilding	27 March 1919	29 October 1920	8 November 1945	Sold for scrap 30 October 1946	Reclassified AVP-15 (1 July 1938), AVD-2 (2 August 1940), DD-244 (1 December 1943), APD-27 (Cancelled 10 July 1944)
Reuben James	DD-245	New York Shipbuilding	2 April 1919	24 September 1920	-----	Sunk 31 October 1941	Torpedoed by U-552, Second American naval casualty of World War II
Bainbridge	DD-246	New York Shipbuilding	26 May 1919	9 February 1921	21 July 1945	Sold for scrap 30 November 1945	
Goff	DD-247	New York Shipbuilding	16 June 1919	19 June 1921	21 July 1945	Sold for scrap 30 November 1945	
Barry	DD-248	New York Shipbuilding	26 July 1919	28 December 1920	21 June 1945	Sunk 22 June 1945	Reclassified APD-29 (15 January 1944), Hit by kamikaze on 25 May 1945. Inspection showed the ship not worth repairing. Hit by kamikaze on 21 June 1945 while under tow.
Hopkins	DD-249	New York Shipbuilding	30 July 1919	21 March 1921	21 December 1945	Sold for scrap 8 November 1946	Most decorated Clemson-class earning two Navy Unit Commendations and 10 battle stars
Lawrence	DD-250	New York Shipbuilding	14 August 1919	18 April 1921	24 October 1945	Sold for scrap 1 October 1946	
Belknap	DD-251	Bethlehem Shipbuilding Corporation, Fore River Shipyard, Quincy	3 September 1918	28 April 1919	4 August 1945	Sold for scrap 30 November 1945	Reclassified AVD-8 (2 August 1940), DD-251 (14 November 1943), APD-32 (22 June 1944), Hit by kamikaze on 11 January 1945 and never repaired.
McCook	DD-252	Bethlehem Shipbuilding Corporation, Fore River Shipyard, Quincy	10 September 1918	30 April 1919 18 December 1939	30 June 1922 24 September 1940	Sunk 22 September 1943	Transferred to Royal Navy (24 September 1940) and immediately transferred Royal Canadian Navy as HMCS St. Croix (I81), Hit by 3 torpedoes from U-305 21 September 1943
McCalla	DD-253	Bethlehem Shipbuilding Corporation, Fore River Shipyard, Quincy	25 September 1918	19 May 1919 18 December 1939	30 June 1922 23 October 1940	Sunk 19 December 1941	Transferred to Royal Navy as HMS Stanley, Torpedoed by U-574
Rodgers	DD-254	Bethlehem Shipbuilding Corporation, Fore River Shipyard, Quincy	5 October 1918	22 July 1919 18 December 1939	20 July 1922 23 October 1940	Sold for scrap by RN 1945	Transferred to Royal Navy (23 October 1940) as HMS Sherwood
Osmond Ingram	DD-255	Bethlehem Shipbuilding Corporation, Fore River Shipyard, Quincy	15 October 1918	28 June 1919 22 November 1940	24 June 1922 8 January 1946	Sold for scrap 17 June 1946	Reclassified AVD-9 (2 August 1940), DD-255 (4 November 1943), APD-35 (22 June 1944)
Bancroft	DD-256	Bethlehem Shipbuilding Corporation, Fore River Shipyard, Quincy	4 November 1918	30 June 1919 18 December 1939	11 July 1922 24 September 1940	Declared surplus to the RCN 1 April 1945	Transferred to Royal Canadian Navy (24 September 1940) as HMCS St. Francis (I93), collided with a collier on the way to be scrapped and sank 14 July 1945.
Welles	DD-257	Bethlehem Shipbuilding Corporation, Fore River Shipyard, Quincy	18 November 1918	2 September 1919 6 November 1939	15 June 1922 9 September 1940	Scrapped November 1944	Transferred to Royal Navy (9 September 1940) as HMS Cameron, Capsized in dry dock 5 December 1940 after an air raid, salvaged 23 February 1941 and used as a hulk for DC tests by UK & US. Paid off on 5 October 1943.
Aulick	DD-258	Bethlehem Shipbuilding Corporation, Fore River Shipyard, Quincy	3 December 1918	26 July 1919 18 June 1939	27 May 1922 8 October 1940	Sold for scrap by RN March 1947	Transferred to Royal Navy (8 October 1940) as HMS Burnham
Turner	DD-259	Bethlehem Shipbuilding Corporation, Fore River Shipyard, Quincy	21 December 1918	24 September 1919 as Moosehead 5 April 1943	7 June 1922 as Moosehead 19 March 1946	Sold for scrap 20 February 1947	28 September 1936 converted to YW-56 and placed in service, Reclassified IX-98 and renamed Moosehead 13 February 1943
Gillis	DD-260	Bethlehem Shipbuilding Corporation, Fore River Shipyard, Quincy	27 December 1918	3 September 1919 28 June 1940	26 May 1922 15 October 1945	Sold for scrap 29 January 1946	Reclassified AVD-12 (2 August 1940)
Delphy	DD-261	Bethlehem Shipbuilding Corporation, Squantum Victory Yard	20 April 1918	30 November 1918	26 October 1923	Wrecked 8 September 1923	Ran aground in the Honda Point disaster, sold for scrap 19 October 1925
McDermut	DD-262	Bethlehem Shipbuilding Corporation, Squantum Victory Yard	20 April 1918	27 March 1919	22 May 1929	Sold for scrap 25 February 1932	
Laub	DD-263	Bethlehem Shipbuilding Corporation, Squantum Victory Yard	20 April 1918	17 March 1919 18 December 1939	15 June 1922 8 October 1940	Sold for scrap by RN March 1947	Transferred to Royal Navy (9 October 1940) as HMS Burwell
McLanahan	DD-264	Bethlehem Shipbuilding Corporation, Squantum Victory Yard	20 April 1918	5 April 1919 18 December 1939	June 1922 9 October 1940	Sold for scrap by RN 19 June 1946	Transferred to Royal Navy (8 October 1940) as HMS Bradford
Edwards	DD-265	Bethlehem Shipbuilding Corporation, Squantum Victory Yard	20 April 1918	24 April 1919 18 December 1939	8 June 1922 8 October 1940	Sold for scrap by RCN 21 March 1946	Transferred to Royal Navy (8 October 1940) as HMS Buxton, later transferred to RCN
Greene (ex-Anthony)	DD-266	Bethlehem Shipbuilding Corporation, Squantum Victory Yard	3 June 1918	9 May 1919 28 June 1940	17 June 1922 23 November 1945	Wrecked 9 October 1945	Reclassified AVD-13 (6 April 1941), APD-36 (1 February 1944), Driven aground by Typhoon Louise, Wreck blown up 11 January 1946
Ballard	DD-267	Bethlehem Shipbuilding Corporation, Squantum Victory Yard	3 June 1918	5 June 1919 25 June 1940	17 June 1922 5 December 1945	Sold for scrap 23 May 1946	Reclassified AVD-10 (2 August 1940)
Shubrick	DD-268	Bethlehem Shipbuilding Corporation, Squantum Victory Yard	3 June 1918	3 July 1919 18 December 1939	8 June 1922 26 November 1940	Sold for scrap by RN 20 March 1945	Transferred to Royal Navy (26 November 1940) as HMS Ripley
Bailey	DD-269	Bethlehem Shipbuilding Corporation, Squantum Victory Yard	3 June 1918	27 June 1919 30 September 1939	16 June 1922 26 November 1940	Sold for scrap by RN 24 July 1945	Transferred to Royal Navy (26 November 1940) as HMS Reading
Thornton	DD-270	Bethlehem Shipbuilding Corporation, Squantum Victory Yard	3 June 1918	15 July 1919 24 June 1940	24 May 1922 2 May 1945	Wrecked 5 April 1945, Beached 2 May 1945	Reclassified AVD-11 (2 August 1940), 5 April 1945 collided with 2 Oilers, Inspection showed the ship not worth repairing, beached & stripped, wreck donated to the government of the Ryukyu Islands July 1957.
Morris	DD-271	Bethlehem Shipbuilding Corporation, Squantum Victory Yard	20 July 1918	21 July 1919	15 June 1922	Sold for scrap 29 September 1936	
Tingey	DD-272	Bethlehem Shipbuilding Corporation, Squantum Victory Yard	8 August 1918	25 July 1919	24 May 1922	Sold for scrap 29 September 1936	
Swasey	DD-273	Bethlehem Shipbuilding Corporation, Squantum Victory Yard	27 August 1918	8 August 1919 18 December 1939	10 June 1922 26 November 1940	Sunk 27 September 1944	Transferred to Royal Navy (26 November 1940) as HMS Rockingham, 27 September 1944 struck a British mine due to poor navigation and foundered under tow.
Meade	DD-274	Bethlehem Shipbuilding Corporation, Squantum Victory Yard	24 September 1918	8 September 1919 18 December 1939	25 May 1922 26 November 1940	Sold for scrap by RN 18 February 1947	Transferred to Royal Navy (26 November 1940) as HMS Ramsey
Sinclair	DD-275	Bethlehem Shipbuilding Corporation, Squantum Victory Yard	11 October 1918	8 October 1919 27 September 1923	25 May 1920 1 June 1929	Sold for scrap 30 August 1935	Renamed Light Target (IX-37) (22 November 1930), Reverted to original name (24 April 1931) & designation (11 August 1931)
McCawley	DD-276	Bethlehem Shipbuilding Corporation, Squantum Victory Yard	2 November 1918	22 September 1919	1 April 1930	Sold for scrap 2 September 1931	
Moody	DD-277	Bethlehem Shipbuilding Corporation, Squantum Victory Yard	9 December 1918	10 December 1919 27 September 1923	15 June 1922 2 June 1930	Sold for scrap 10 June 1931	Sold to MGM in for making the film Hell Below. Moody was made up to look like a World War I Austro-Hungarian Navy minelayer and sunk by studio demolitions on 21 February 1933.
Henshaw	DD-278	Bethlehem Shipbuilding Corporation, Squantum Victory Yard	31 December 1918	10 December 1919	11 March 1930	Sold for scrap 14 November 1930	
Meyer	DD-279	Bethlehem Shipbuilding Corporation, Squantum Victory Yard	6 February 1919	17 December 1919	15 May 1929	Sold for scrap 25 February 1932	
Doyen	DD-280	Bethlehem Shipbuilding Corporation, Squantum Victory Yard	24 March 1919	17 December 1919	25 February 1930	Sold for scrap 20 December 1930	
Sharkey	DD-281	Bethlehem Shipbuilding Corporation, Squantum Victory Yard	14 April 1919	28 November 1919	1 May 1930	Sold for scrap 17 January 1931	
Toucey	DD-282	Bethlehem Shipbuilding Corporation, Squantum Victory Yard	26 April 1919	9 December 1919	1 May 1930	Sold for scrap 17 January 1931	
Breck	DD-283	Bethlehem Shipbuilding Corporation, Squantum Victory Yard	8 May 1919	1 December 1919	1 May 1930	Sold for scrap 17 January 1931	
Isherwood	DD-284	Bethlehem Shipbuilding Corporation, Squantum Victory Yard	24 May 1919	4 December 1919	1 May 1930	Sold for scrap 17 January 1931	
Case	DD-285	Bethlehem Shipbuilding Corporation, Squantum Victory Yard	3 June 1919	8 December 1919	22 October 1930	Sold for scrap 17 January 1931	
Lardner	DD-286	Bethlehem Shipbuilding Corporation, Squantum Victory Yard	14 June 1919	10 December 1919	1 May 1930	Sold for scrap 17 January 1931	
Putnam	DD-287	Bethlehem Shipbuilding Corporation, Squantum Victory Yard	30 June 1919	18 December 1919	21 September 1929	Sold 17 January 1931	Rebuilt as banana boat MV Teapa, chartered by US Army as USAT Teapa in early 1942 in an effort to resupply Corregidor, Returned to former owners 1945, scrapped 1955.
Worden	DD-288	Bethlehem Shipbuilding Corporation, Squantum Victory Yard	30 June 1919	24 February 1920	1 May 1930	Sold 17 January 1931	Rebuilt as banana boat MV Tabasco, wrecked 1932
Flusser	DD-289	Bethlehem Shipbuilding Corporation, Squantum Victory Yard	21 July 1919	25 February 1920	1 May 1930	Sold for scrap 17 January 1931	
Dale	DD-290	Bethlehem Shipbuilding Corporation, Squantum Victory Yard	29 July 1919	16 February 1920	1 May 1930	Sold 17 January 1931	Rebuilt as banana boat MV Masaya, chartered by US Army as USAT Masaya in early 1942 in an effort to resupply Corregidor, sunk 28 March 1943.
Converse	DD-291	Bethlehem Shipbuilding Corporation, Squantum Victory Yard	13 August 1919	28 April 1920	1 May 1930	Sold for scrap 17 January 1931	
Reid	DD-292	Bethlehem Shipbuilding Corporation, Squantum Victory Yard	9 September 1919	3 December 1919	1 May 1930	Sold for scrap 17 January 1931	
Billingsley	DD-293	Bethlehem Shipbuilding Corporation, Squantum Victory Yard	8 September 1919	1 March 1920	1 May 1930	Sold for scrap 17 January 1931	
Charles Ausburn	DD-294	Bethlehem Shipbuilding Corporation, Squantum Victory Yard	11 September 1919	23 March 1920	1 May 1930	Sold for scrap 17 January 1931	
Osborne	DD-295	Bethlehem Shipbuilding Corporation, Squantum Victory Yard	23 September 1919	17 May 1920	1 May 1930	Sold 17 January 1931	Rebuilt as banana boat MV Matagalpa, chartered by US Army as USAT Matagalpa in early 1942 in an effort to resupply Corregidor, burned 27 June 1942 (total loss), scuttled 6 September 1947
Chauncey	DD-296	Bethlehem Shipbuilding Corporation, Union Iron Works, San Francisco	17 June 1918	25 June 1919	26 October 1923	Wrecked 8 September 1923	Ran aground in the Honda Point disaster, sold for scrap 19 October 1925
Fuller	DD-297	Bethlehem Shipbuilding Corporation, Union Iron Works, San Francisco	4 July 1918	28 February 1920	26 October 1923	Wrecked 8 September 1923	Ran aground in the Honda Point disaster, sold for scrap 19 October 1925
Percival	DD-298	Bethlehem Shipbuilding Corporation, Union Iron Works, San Francisco	4 July 1918	31 March 1920	26 April 1930	Sold for scrap 19 March 1931	
John Francis Burnes (ex-Swasey)	DD-299	Bethlehem Shipbuilding Corporation, Union Iron Works, San Francisco	4 July 1918	1 May 1920	25 February 1930	Sold for scrap 10 June 1931	
Farragut	DD-300	Bethlehem Shipbuilding Corporation, Union Iron Works, San Francisco	4 July 1918	4 June 1920	1 April 1930	Sold for scrap 31 October 1930	
Somers	DD-301	Bethlehem Shipbuilding Corporation, Union Iron Works, San Francisco	4 July 1918	23 June 1920	10 April 1930	Sold for scrap 19 March 1931	
Stoddert	DD-302	Bethlehem Shipbuilding Corporation, Union Iron Works, San Francisco	4 July 1918	30 June 1920 6 April 1931	20 May 1930 10 January 1933	Sold for scrap 30 August 1935	Renamed Light Target No. 1 (5 November 1930), Reclassified AG-18 (30 June 1931), Renamed Somers (1931), reclassified DD-302 (16 April 1932).
Reno	DD-303	Bethlehem Shipbuilding Corporation, Union Iron Works, San Francisco	4 July 1918	23 July 1920	18 January 1930	Sold for scrap 1931	
Farquhar	DD-304	Bethlehem Shipbuilding Corporation, Union Iron Works, San Francisco	13 August 1918	31 July 1920	20 February 1930	Sold for scrap 23 April 1932	
Thompson	DD-305	Bethlehem Shipbuilding Corporation, Union Iron Works, San Francisco	14 August 1918	16 August 1920	4 April 1930	Sold for scrap 10 June 1930	Used as a floating restaurant in the 1930s, repurchased by the Navy in February 1944 and partly sunk in the mud flats of San Francisco Bay where Army and Navy aircraft carried out bombing runs with dummy bombs, Portions of the wreck remain above the waterline to this day.
Kennedy	DD-306	Bethlehem Shipbuilding Corporation, Union Iron Works, San Francisco	25 September 1918	28 August 1920	20 February 1930	Sold for scrap 23 April 1932	
Paul Hamilton (ex-Hamilton)	DD-307	Bethlehem Shipbuilding Corporation, Union Iron Works, San Francisco	8 June 1918	24 September 1920	20 January 1930	Sold for scrap 1931	
William Jones	DD-308	Bethlehem Shipbuilding Corporation, Union Iron Works, San Francisco	2 October 1918	30 September 1920	24 May 1930	Sold for scrap 25 February 1932	
Woodbury	DD-309	Bethlehem Shipbuilding Corporation, Union Iron Works, San Francisco	3 October 1918	20 October 1920	26 October 1923	Wrecked 8 September 1923	Ran aground in the Honda Point disaster, sold for scrap 19 October 1925
S. P. Lee	DD-310	Bethlehem Shipbuilding Corporation, Union Iron Works, San Francisco	31 December 1918	30 October 1920	26 October 1923	Wrecked 8 September 1923	Ran aground in the Honda Point disaster, sold for scrap 19 October 1925
Nicholas	DD-311	Bethlehem Shipbuilding Corporation, Union Iron Works, San Francisco	11 January 1919	23 November 1920	26 October 1923	Wrecked 8 September 1923	Ran aground in the Honda Point disaster, sold for scrap 19 October 1925
Young	DD-312	Bethlehem Shipbuilding Corporation, Union Iron Works, San Francisco	28 January 1919	29 November 1920	26 October 1923	Wrecked 8 September 1923	Ran aground in the Honda Point disaster, sold for scrap 19 October 1925
Zeilin	DD-313	Bethlehem Shipbuilding Corporation, Union Iron Works, San Francisco	20 February 1919	10 December 1920	22 January 1930	Sold for scrap 1930	
Yarborough	DD-314	Bethlehem Shipbuilding Corporation, Union Iron Works, San Francisco	27 February 1919	31 December 1920	29 May 1930	Sold for scrap 25 February 1932	
La Vallette	DD-315	Bethlehem Shipbuilding Corporation, Union Iron Works, San Francisco	14 April 1919	24 December 1920	19 April 1930	Sold for scrap 10 June 1931	
Sloat	DD-316	Bethlehem Shipbuilding Corporation, Union Iron Works, San Francisco	18 January 1919	30 December 1920	2 June 1930	Sunk as target 26 June 1935	
Wood	DD-317	Bethlehem Shipbuilding Corporation, Union Iron Works, San Francisco	23 January 1919	28 January 1921	31 March 1930	Sold for scrap 14 November 1930	
Shirk	DD-318	Bethlehem Shipbuilding Corporation, Union Iron Works, San Francisco	23 February 1919	25 January 1921	8 February 1930	Sold for scrap 27 January 1931	
Kidder	DD-319	Bethlehem Shipbuilding Corporation, Union Iron Works, San Francisco	5 March 1919	7 February 1921	18 March 1930	Sold for scrap 31 October 1930	
Selfridge	DD-320	Bethlehem Shipbuilding Corporation, Union Iron Works, San Francisco	28 April 1919	17 February 1921	18 March 1930	Sold for scrap 31 October 1930	
Marcus	DD-321	Bethlehem Shipbuilding Corporation, Union Iron Works, San Francisco	20 May 1919	23 February 1921	31 May 1930	Sunk as target 25 June 1935	
Mervine	DD-322	Bethlehem Shipbuilding Corporation, Union Iron Works, San Francisco	28 April 1919	28 February 1921	4 June 1930	Sold for scrap 1930	
Chase	DD-323	Bethlehem Shipbuilding Corporation, Union Iron Works, San Francisco	5 May 1919	10 March 1921	15 May 1930	Sold for scrap 1931	
Robert Smith	DD-324	Bethlehem Shipbuilding Corporation, Union Iron Works, San Francisco	13 May 1919	17 March 1921	1 March 1930	Sold for scrap 10 June 1931	
Mullany	DD-325	Bethlehem Shipbuilding Corporation, Union Iron Works, San Francisco	3 June 1919	29 March 1921	1 May 1930	Sold for scrap 19 March 1931	
Coghlan	DD-326	Bethlehem Shipbuilding Corporation, Union Iron Works, San Francisco	25 June 1919	31 March 1921	1 May 1930	Sold for scrap 19 March 1931	
Preston	DD-327	Bethlehem Shipbuilding Corporation, Union Iron Works, San Francisco	19 July 1919	13 April 1921	1 May 1930	Sold for scrap 23 August 1932	
Lamson	DD-328	Bethlehem Shipbuilding Corporation, Union Iron Works, San Francisco	13 August 1919	19 April 1921	1 May 1930	Sold for scrap 17 January 1931	
Bruce	DD-329	Bethlehem Shipbuilding Corporation, Union Iron Works, San Francisco	30 July 1919	29 September 1920	1 May 1930	Sold for scrap 23 August 1932	
Hull	DD-330	Bethlehem Shipbuilding Corporation, Union Iron Works, San Francisco	13 September 1920	26 April 1921	31 March 1930	Sold for scrap 10 June 1931	
Macdonough	DD-331	Bethlehem Shipbuilding Corporation, Union Iron Works, San Francisco	24 May 1920	30 April 1921	8 January 1930	Sold for scrap 20 December 1930	
Farenholt	DD-332	Bethlehem Shipbuilding Corporation, Union Iron Works, San Francisco	13 September 1920	10 May 1921	20 February 1930	Sold for scrap 10 June 1931	
Sumner	DD-333	Bethlehem Shipbuilding Corporation, Union Iron Works, San Francisco	27 August 1919	27 May 1921	29 March 1930	Sold for scrap 12 June 1934	
Corry	DD-334	Bethlehem Shipbuilding Corporation, Union Iron Works, San Francisco	15 September 1920	25 May 1921	24 April 1930	Sold for scrap 18 October 1930	Scrapping was halted after removing most of the superstructure and forward hull. The remains of the ship were then towed to and abandoned as a break wall in the Napa River where she remains as of 2023.
Melvin	DD-335	Bethlehem Shipbuilding Corporation, Union Iron Works, San Francisco	15 September 1920	31 May 1921	8 May 1930	Sold for scrap 1930	
Litchfield	DD-336	Mare Island Naval Shipyard	15 January 1919	12 May 1920	5 November 1945	Scrapping was completed by the Philadelphia NY 29 March 1946	Reclassified AG-98 (31 March 1945)
Zane	DD-337	Mare Island Naval Shipyard	15 January 1919	15 February 1921 25 February 1930	1 February 1923 14 December 1945	Sold for scrap 22 October 1946	Reclassified DMS-14 (19 November 1940), AG-109 (5 June 1945)
Wasmuth	DD-338	Mare Island Naval Shipyard	12 August 1919	15 December 1921 11 March 1930	26 July 1922 -----	Foundered 29 December 1942	Reclassified DMS-15 (19 November 1940), 27 December 1942 during a heavy Alaskan storm two depth charges were wrenched from their tracks by the pounding sea, fell over the side, and exploded beneath the ship's fantail. The blasts carried away part of the ship's stern and the ship began to founder.
Trever	DD-339	Mare Island Naval Shipyard	12 August 1919	3 August 1922 2 June 1930	17 January 1923 23 November 1945	Sold for scrap 12 November 1946	Reclassified DMS-16 (19 November 1940), AG-110 (5 June 1945)
Perry	DD-340	Mare Island Naval Shipyard	15 September 1920	7 August 1922 1 April 1930	17 January 1923 -----	Sunk 13 September 1944	DMS-17 (19 November 1940), struck a Japanese mine
Decatur	DD-341	Mare Island Naval Shipyard	15 September 1920	9 August 1922 26 September 1923	17 January 1923 28 July 1945	Sold for scrap 30 November 1945	
Hulbert	DD-342	Norfolk Naval Shipyard	18 November 1918	27 October 1920 2 August 1940	17 October 1934 2 November 1945	Sold for scrap 31 October 1946	Reclassified AVP-19 (15 November 1939), AVD-6 (2 August 1940), DD-342 (1 December 1943)
Noa	DD-343	Norfolk Naval Shipyard	18 November 1918	15 February 1921 1 April 1940	11 November 1934 -----	Foundered 12 September 1944	Reclassified APD-24 (10 August 1943), sank after being rammed by Fullam (DD-474).
William B. Preston	DD-344	Norfolk Naval Shipyard	18 November 1918	23 August 1920 14 June 1940	15 October 1934 6 December 1945	Sold for scrap 6 November 1946	Reclassified AVP-20 (18 November 1939, AVD-7 (2 August 1940)
Preble	DD-345	Bath Iron Works	12 April 1919	19 March 1920	7 December 1945	Sold for scrap 26 October 1946	Reclassified DM-20 (30 June 1937, AG-99 (5 June 1945)
Sicard	DD-346	Bath Iron Works	18 March 1919	9 June 1920	21 November 1945	Sold for scrap 22 June 1946	Reclassified DM-21 (20 June 1937), AG-100 (5 June 1945)
Pruitt	DD-347	Bath Iron Works	25 June 1919	2 September 1920	16 November 1945	Scrapped at Philadelphia Navy Yard in 1946	Reclassified DM-22 (30 June 1937), AG-101 (5 June 1945)

^{i} - Her name was struck from the Navy list on 25 March 1942 and was soon assigned to a new ship, USS Stewart (DE-238), which was still in commission. The Stewart (DE-238) still exists as a museum at the Galveston Naval Museum.
