= USS Corry =

Three ships of United States Navy were named USS Corry for William Merrill Corry, Jr.

- USS Corry (DD-334), a Clemson-class destroyer, was commissioned in 1921 and decommissioned in 1930.
- USS Corry (DD-463), a Gleaves-class destroyer, served from 1941 until she was sunk on D-Day, 6 June 1944.
- USS Corry (DD-817), a Gearing-class destroyer, was launched in 1945. In 1981, the ship was transferred to Greece and renamed Kriezis.
