= USS Sloat (DD-316) =

Clemson-class destroyer

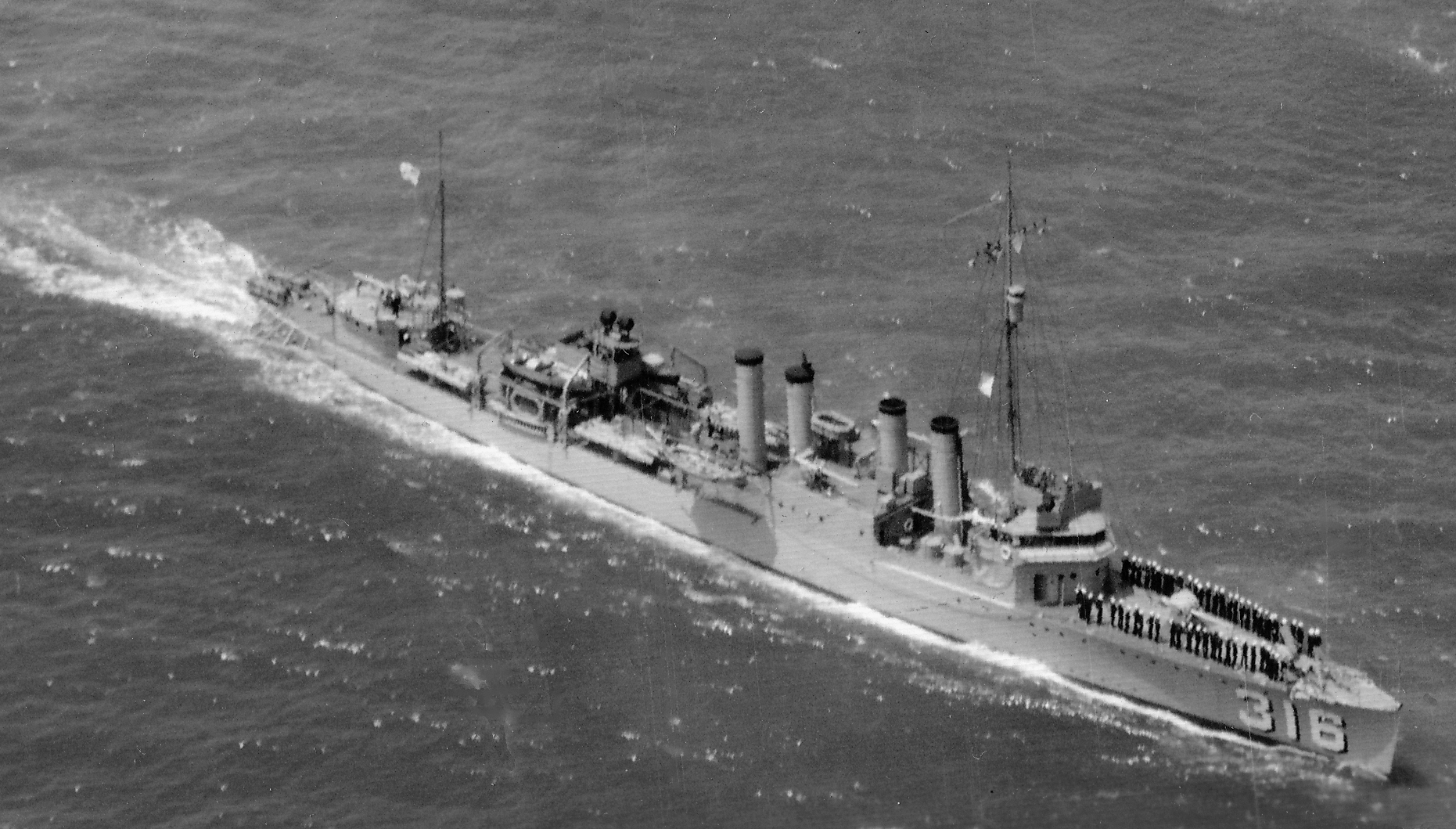
- USS Sloat (DD-316) in 1927

History

United States
- Namesake: John Drake Sloat
- Builder: Bethlehem Shipbuilding Corporation, Union Iron Works, San Francisco
- Laid down: 18 January 1919
- Launched: 14 May 1919
- Commissioned: 30 December 1920
- Decommissioned: 2 June 1930
- Stricken: 28 January 1935
- Fate: Sunk as a target, 26 June 1935

General characteristics
- Class & type: Clemson-class destroyer
- Displacement: 1,215 tons
- Length: 314 feet 4 1/2 inches (95.82 m)
- Beam: 30 feet 11 1/2 inches (9.44 m)
- Draft: 9 feet 4 inches (2.84 m)
- Propulsion: 26,500 shp (20 MW); geared turbines, 2 screws
- Speed: 35 knots (65 km/h)
- Range: 4,900 nmi (9,100 km); @ 15 kt
- Complement: 122 officers and enlisted
- Armament: 4 × 4 in (102 mm)/50 guns, 1 × 3 in (76 mm)/25 gun, 12 × 21 inch (533 mm) torpedo tubes

The first USS Sloat (DD-316) was a Clemson-class destroyer in the United States Navy following World War I. She was named for John Drake Sloat.

== History ==
Sloat was laid down on 18 January 1919 by the Bethlehem Shipbuilding Corporation, San Francisco, California; launched on 14 May 1919; sponsored by Mrs. Edwin A. Sherman; and commissioned on 30 December 1920.

Sloat arrived at San Diego, California for shakedown on 24 January 1921 and then was placed in reserve until October. She conducted gunnery exercises during the winter and carried out torpedo trials in April and May 1922. On 27 June, she sailed with the fleet for Puget Sound and operated in that area until returning to San Diego on 19 September. On 6 February 1923, she departed San Diego with the fleet, and conducted exercises off Panama until returning on 11 April. She spent most of the remainder of the year, and much of the next, undergoing repairs at Mare Island before returning to San Diego on 22 December 1924.

On 3 April 1925, Sloat sailed from San Diego with the fleet for exercises off Hawaii. On 1 July, the Battle Fleet sailed from Hawaii for a goodwill cruise to the Southwest Pacific, and Sloat called at Melbourne, Australia; Lyttelton and Wellington, New Zealand; and American Samoa before returning to San Diego on 19 September.

The destroyer departed San Diego on 1 February 1926 and participated in fleet exercises off Panama from 15 February to 8 March, and then underwent overhaul at Mare Island from 22 March to 4 May. After a summer of reserve training cruises, she again underwent repairs at Mare Island from 30 December 1926 to 3 February 1927.

Sloat sailed with the Battle Fleet for fleet exercises on 17 February 1927 and transited the Panama Canal on 5 March. The exercises in the Caribbean lasted until 22 April, and the fleet then visited New York and carried out a joint Army and Navy exercise in Narragansett Bay before arriving in Hampton Roads on 29 May for a Presidential review. After getting underway for Panama on 4 June, Sloat received repairs from a tender in Gatun Lake, Canal Zone, and then was ordered to relieve Mervine (DD-322) on patrol off the Nicaraguan coast.

Her mission was to protect lives and property of United States citizens and of other foreign nationals in Nicaragua and to help preserve order. She served two tours off Nicaragua under the Special Service Squadron: from 25 June to 6 July and from 22 July to 8 August 1927. Transiting the canal on 10 August, she returned to San Diego on 23 August and underwent overhaul at Mare Island from 19 February to 31 March 1928.

Sloat departed San Diego on 9 April 1928 and arrived at Pearl Harbor with the fleet on the 28th, having participated in Fleet Problem VIII en route. She returned to San Diego on 23 June and reached Puget Sound on 9 July for summer exercises. Returning to San Diego on 1 September, she took part in exercises off the Canal Zone from 27 January to 6 February 1929 and then underwent overhaul at Mare Island from 3 March to 13 April. She conducted training off San Diego during the summer; and, after a one-week trip to San Francisco, returned to San Diego on 28 August 1929.

Sloat was replaced by the recommissioned Upshur (DD-144) and decommissioned on 2 June 1930, struck from the Navy list on 28 January 1935, and sunk at sea as a target off San Diego on 26 June 1935.
