= USS Hulbert =

Tender of the United States Navy

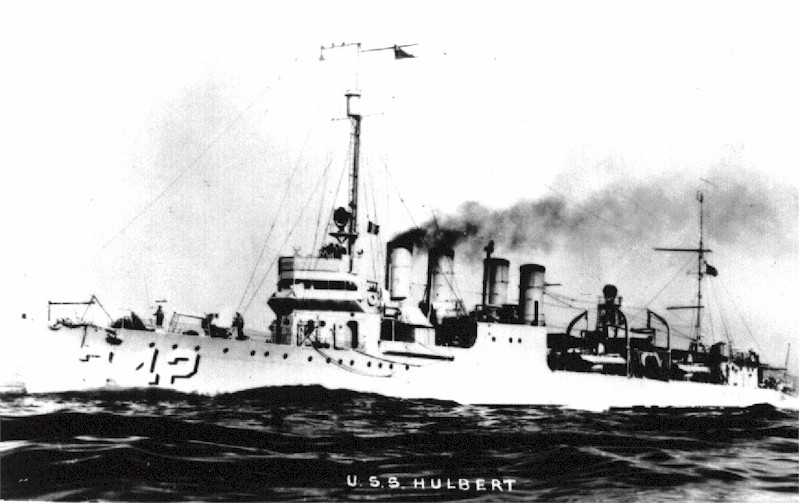
- USS Hulbert (DD-342)

History

United States
- Namesake: Henry Hulbert
- Builder: Norfolk Naval Shipyard
- Laid down: 18 November 1918
- Launched: 28 June 1919
- Commissioned: 27 October 1920
- Decommissioned: 2 November 1945
- Stricken: 28 November 1945
- Fate: Sold for scrap, 31 October 1946

General characteristics
- Class & type: Clemson-class destroyer
- Displacement: 1,190 tons
- Length: 314 feet 5 inches (95.83 m)
- Beam: 30 feet 8 inches (9.35 m)
- Draft: 9 feet 3 inches (2.82 m)
- Propulsion: 26,500 shp (20 MW); geared turbines, 2 screws
- Speed: 35 knots (65 km/h)
- Range: 4,900 nmi (9,100 km); @ 15 kt
- Complement: 126 officers and enlisted
- Armament: 4 × 4 in (102 mm)/50 guns, 2 × 3 in (76 mm)/25 guns, 12 × 21 inch (533 mm) torpedo tubes

USS Hulbert (DD-342/AVD-6) was a Clemson-class destroyer in the United States Navy following World War I. She was named for Henry Hulbert.

== Service history ==
Hulbert was launched by Norfolk Navy Yard, Portsmouth, Virginia, 28 June 1918; sponsored by Mrs. V. C. Hulbert, widow of Lieutenant Hulbert; and commissioned 27 October 1920.

=== Prewar service ===
Following shakedown training out of Norfolk, Virginia, Hulbert took part in destroyer maneuvers in the Atlantic until June 1921, when she assisted in ordnance tests on obsolete American and captured German ships. For the next year, the ship operated out of Newport with other destroyers.

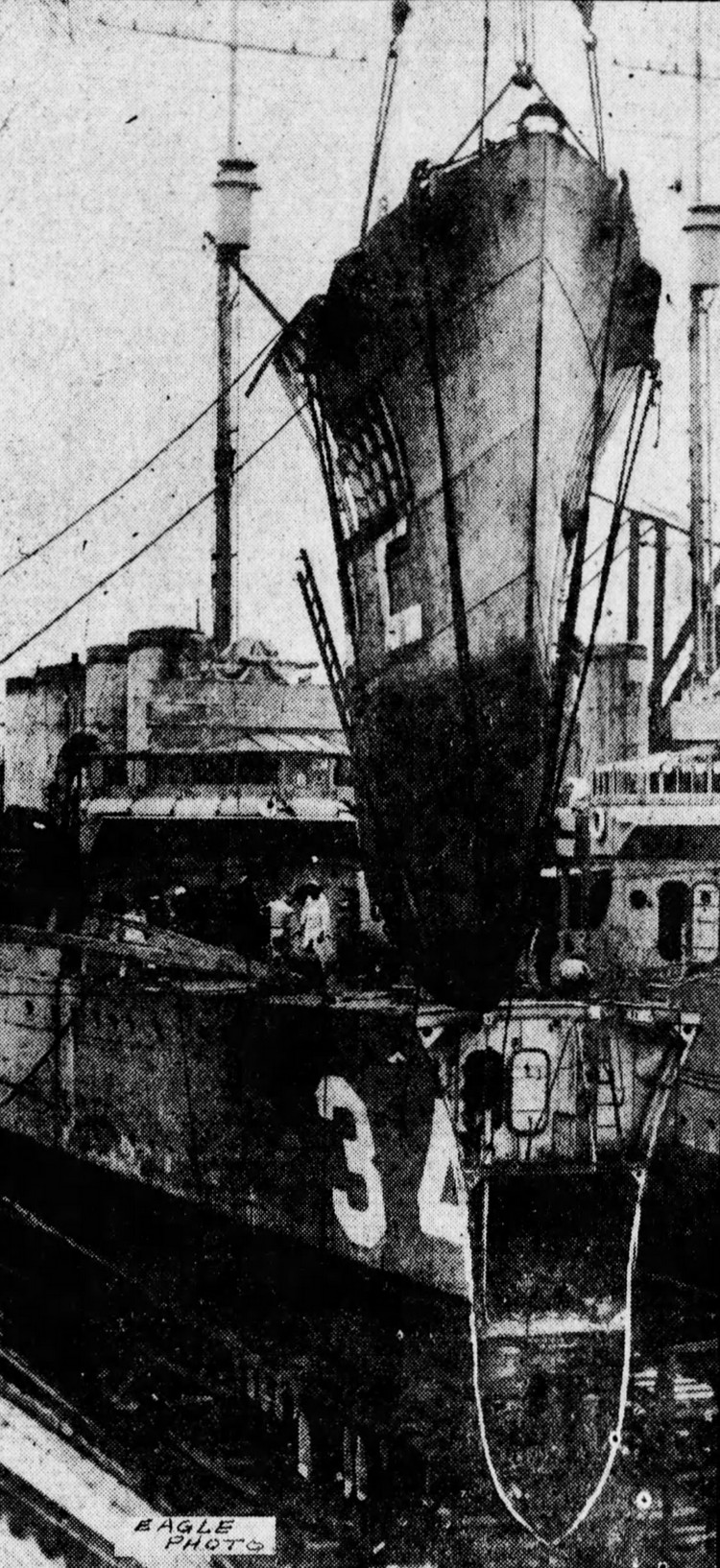
Graham's bow in the process of being grafted onto Hulbert, May 1922

During spring maneuvers in Guantanamo Bay, Cuba, in early 1922, Hulbert's bow was crushed in a collision. Coincidentally, another Clemson-class destroyer, USS Graham, had been damaged in a collision some months prior and was in the process of being scrapped. Rather than repair Hulbert's bow, it was decided to remove Graham's bow and graft it onto Hulbert. The procedure was carried out at the Brooklyn Navy Yard on 17 May 1922.

Hulbert sailed 20 June 1922 for duty on the Asiatic Station, steaming via the Mediterranean and Ceylon to Chefoo, China, 26 August. The ship patrolled Chinese and Philippine waters in the year that followed, protecting American interests during the Chinese Civil War. On the night of 28 February 1923, six crew were killed in the engine room when furnace oil flared back and trapped them. She also took part in periodic fleet exercises designed to keep her crew and equipment at maximum readiness. Hulbert took part in the evacuation of American civilians and missionaries in March 1927 and September 1928. Completing this lengthy tour of duty in the Far East, she sailed 22 July 1929 from Yokohama, arriving San Diego 17 August.

During the remainder of the year, Hulbert acted as plane guard for carriers Langley and Saratoga off California, thus helping to develop carrier-group tactics. She took part in important fleet exercises on both coasts, during the period from 1930 to 1934 and arrived Philadelphia 14 August 1934. She decommissioned there 17 October 1934 and was placed in reserve.

Hulbert was converted to a seaplane tender, recommissioning at New York Navy Yard as AVD-6 on 2 August 1940. She arrived in San Diego 24 August via Guantanamo Bay and the Panama Canal Zone, and began servicing Patrol Wing 1 on operations off the West Coast, helping to perfect America's seaplane reconnaissance capability. Hulbert sailed 8 May 1941 for Pearl Harbor, where she became headquarters ship for the seaplane wing and continued servicing and repairing her planes.

=== World War II and postwar service ===
On the morning of 7 December 1941, during the attack on Pearl Harbor, Hulbert was moored at the Submarine Base, Pearl Harbor. General Quarters sounded just before 08:00, and the ship's antiaircraft batteries immediately opened fire at attacking planes. This vessel went to general quarters when the Japanese attack was first sighted by the watch aboard, and is believed to have been the first ship in the fleet to open fire. As the Japanese directed their attention to Ford Island and the battleships, she shot down one torpedo plane at 0758, shared in bringing down a dive bomber at about 0820 and damaged several other aircraft. After the attack the ship assisted in the rescue effort. After loading ammunition, she moved to Hilo 9 December to set up an advance base for the all-important patrol bombers. Hulbert was also called upon to aid aircraft at sea, as on Christmas Day she repaired a seaplane at sea and then towed it for nearly 3 days when heavy seas prevented a safe takeoff.

After sundown on 30 December 1941 Hulbert was engaged by Japanese submarine I-1 while moored. The IJN vessel claimed moderate damage and hit the adjacent pier. Hulbert returned fire, aided by a local Coast Artillery unit.

The ship also made supply runs to Palmyra Atoll before moving north to Kodiak 6 June 1942. The Japanese had occupied Kiska and Attu as part of the abortive Midway Offensive, and Hulbert was assigned to tend the seaplanes of VP-43 during reconnaissance flights and bombing raids on those islands. The ship also steamed to Seguam Island 30 August 1942, landing a party of marines to search for a Japanese radio station. Next day, she arrived in Atka to aid torpedoed tender USS Casco, alternating between salvage efforts and seaplane tending during September. Hulbert sailed 4 October for supplies and repairs at San Francisco, California.

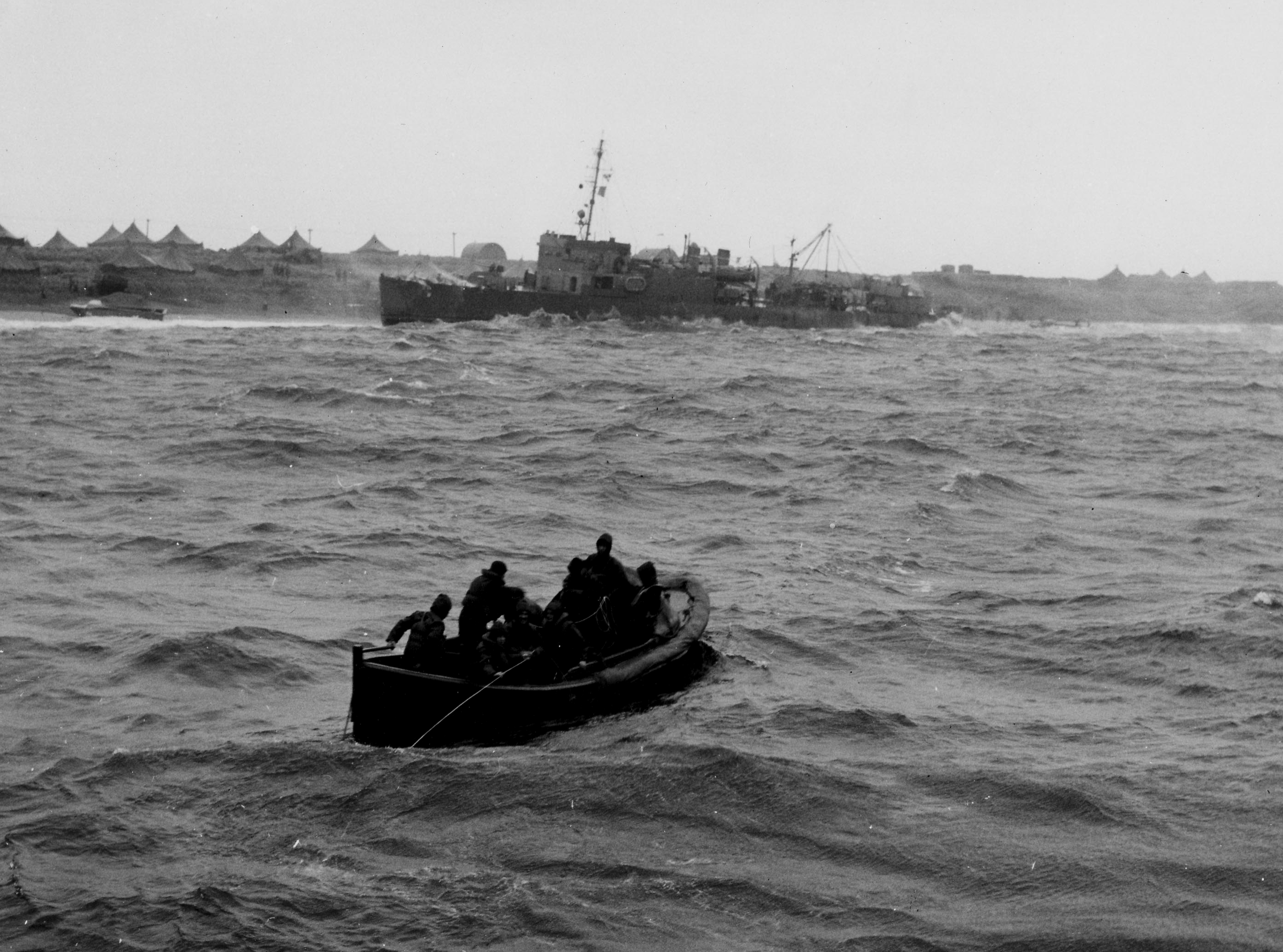
Hulbert stranded on Attu, 1943.

She was again underway from Seattle, Washington 8 December 1942 for Kodiak where the ship serviced patrol bombers during the first months of 1943. In May Hulbert moved to Amchitka, acting as communications ship during the recapture of Attu that spring. She moved again to Attu in June, to provide fuel and communications services for seaplanes and torpedo boats but was blown ashore in Massacre Bay during a severe storm 30 June 1943. Hulbert's hull was seriously damaged and, after temporary repairs at Dutch Harbor, she arrived in Seattle 30 August for a major overhaul.

The ship was reclassified DD-342 on 1 December 1943, and sailed 15 January 1944 to San Diego to take up new duties as an escort ship. For the remainder of the war Hulbert acted as plane guard and screen ship for dozens of new escort carriers as they made ready to join America's striking fleet in the Far East. The ship also served as a maneuvering torpedo target during pilot training and rescued a dozen pilots during this period. After the war's end, Hulbert sailed 30 September, escorting carrier USS Ranger to the Panama Canal Zone and arrived Philadelphia 17 October 1945.

She decommissioned 2 November 1945 and was sold for scrap on 31 October 1946 to Ship Shape, Inc., Philadelphia.

Hulbert received two battle stars for World War II service.

As of 2009, no other ship has been named USS Hulbert.
