= USS Corry (DD-817) =

Gearing-class destroyer

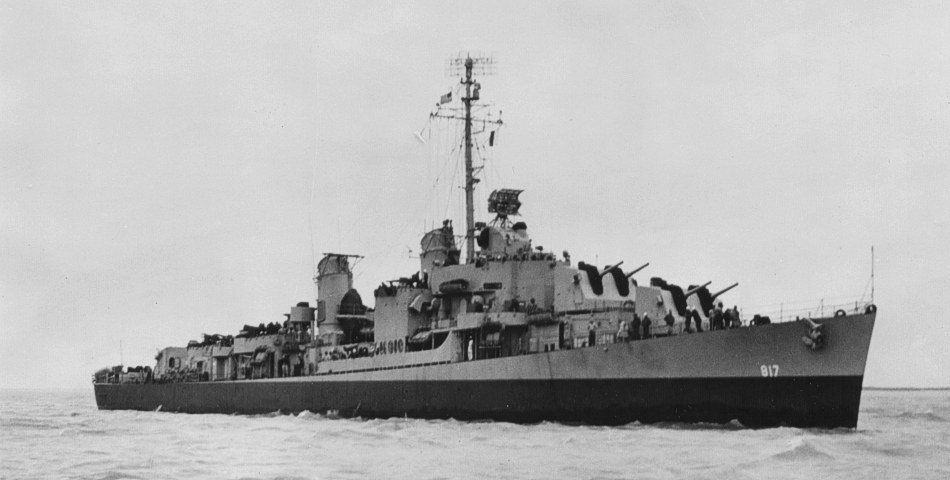
- USS Corry (DD-817) in March 1946

History

United States
- Name: USS Corry
- Namesake: William M. Corry, Jr.
- Builder: Consolidated Steel Corporation, Orange, Texas
- Laid down: 5 April 1945
- Launched: 28 July 1945
- Commissioned: 27 February 1946
- Reclassified: DDR-817, 9 April 1953
- Reclassified: DD-817, 1 January 1964
- Modernized: September 1964 (FRAM IB)
- Decommissioned: 27 February 1981
- Stricken: 27 February 1981
- Identification: Callsign: NAYC; Hull number: DD-817
- Fate: Transferred to Greece, 8 July 1981

Greece
- Name: Kriezis
- Namesake: Antonios Kriezis
- Acquired: 8 July 1981
- Stricken: 1994
- Identification: D217
- Fate: Scrapped, 2002

General characteristics
- Class & type: Gearing-class destroyer
- Displacement: 3,460 long tons (3,516 t) full
- Length: 390 ft 6 in (119.02 m)
- Beam: 40 ft 10 in (12.45 m)
- Draft: 14 ft 4 in (4.37 m)
- Propulsion: Geared turbines, 2 shafts, 60,000 shp (45 MW)
- Speed: 35 knots (65 km/h; 40 mph)
- Range: 4,500 nmi (8,300 km) at 20 kn (37 km/h; 23 mph)
- Complement: 336
- Armament: 6 × 5-inch/38-caliber guns; 12 × 40 mm AA guns; 11 × 20 mm AA guns; 10 × 21 inch (533 mm) torpedo tubes; 6 × depth charge projectors; 2 × depth charge tracks

USS Corry (DD/DDR-817) was a Gearing-class destroyer of the United States Navy, the third Navy ship named for Lieutenant Commander William M. Corry, Jr. (1889–1920), a naval aviator who was posthumously awarded the Medal of Honor.

Corry was launched on 28 July 1945 by Consolidated Steel Corp. of Texas, Orange, Texas; sponsored by Miss Corry; commissioned on 27 February 1946 and reported to the Atlantic Fleet.

== Service history ==
Corry sailed from Galveston, Texas, on 28 March 1946 for shakedown training in the Caribbean Sea, and arrived at Norfolk, Virginia, on 10 July. Following a tour of duty in European waters and the Mediterranean Sea from 23 July 1946 to 19 March 1947, Corry conducted Reserve training cruises from the Potomac River Naval Command, then reported to Pensacola, Florida, to serve as plane guard for aircraft carriers operating off Florida from 22 September 1947 to 28 April 1950.

Corry joined Destroyer Squadron 8 (DesRon 8) at Norfolk 22 May 1950 for antisubmarine exercises which included a cruise to Quebec in July. From 2 September to 12 November she served with the 6th Fleet in the Mediterranean, and joined a midshipman cruise to northern Europe, visiting Gotesburg and Cherbourg, France, from 1 June to 27 July 1951. Her next tour of duty with the 6th Fleet was from 22 April to 23 October 1952. Corry sailed out of Norfolk for local operations until 1 April 1953 when she was decommissioned for conversion to a radar picket destroyer. She was reclassified DDR-817, 9 April 1953.

Recommissioned 9 January 1954, Corry carried NROTC midshipmen on a cruise to New Orleans, Louisiana, and through the Panama Canal for operations at Balboa in the summer of 1954. From September 1954 through 1960 Corry alternated four tours of duty with the 6th Fleet in the Mediterranean with operations out of Norfolk along the east coast, and exercises in the Caribbean.

=== 1964–1981 ===
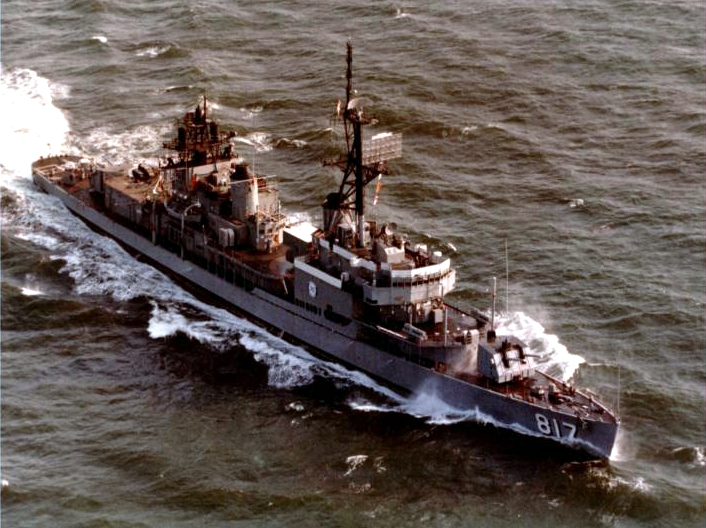
Corry in the 1970s.

Corry reverted to DD-817 on 1 January 1964.

She entered one of the milestones of the ship’s career in the summer and autumn of 1964, when she took part in Fleet Rehabilitation and Modernization (FRAM) I, a program intended to extend the life of some of the Navy’s ships. Planners envisioned carrying out the initiative in three phases, which in the case of World War II-vintage destroyers consisted primarily of installing equipment and systems to enable the ships to contend more effectively with the numerous and increasingly capable East Bloc submarines. Perhaps most dramatically, Corry underwent a FRAM I conversion to embark and operate a Gyrodyne QH-50 Drone Anti-Submarine Helicopter (DASH). The work included adding a small hangar and flight deck aft, and systems to facilitate controlling DASH. Shipyard workers and sailors also installed an eight cell Mk 112 to launch RUR-5 Anti-Submarine ROCkets (ASROC) amidships, mounted two new Mk 32 triple torpedo tubes that could launch 12.75-inch Mk 44 antisubmarine homing torpedoes, furthermore enlarged and modernized the Combat Information Center, and installed new radar, sonar, and electronic warfare systems. The ship wrapped up her conversion in September 1964.

Corry performed a Western Pacific cruise from September 1968 to April 1969 in support of US forces in Vietnam. The ship sailed 49,125 nautical miles (90,980 km; 56,532 mi) round trip out of Norfolk, Virginia. While supporting US forces during the Vietnam War, the ship fired 6,607 5"38 cal rounds, destroyed 72 structures and bunkers with 15 known enemy kills.

Corry was decommissioned and struck from the Naval Vessel Register on 27 February 1981.

== Greek service ==
The ship was transferred to Greece on 8 July 1981, and served in the Hellenic Navy as Kriezis (D217). She was stricken in 1994. On 8 April 2002 the ship was removed from Souda Bay, Crete to be towed to Turkey for scrapping.
