= USS Corry (DD-334) =

Clemson-class destroyer

Coordinates: 38°10′0.47″N 122°17′14.87″W

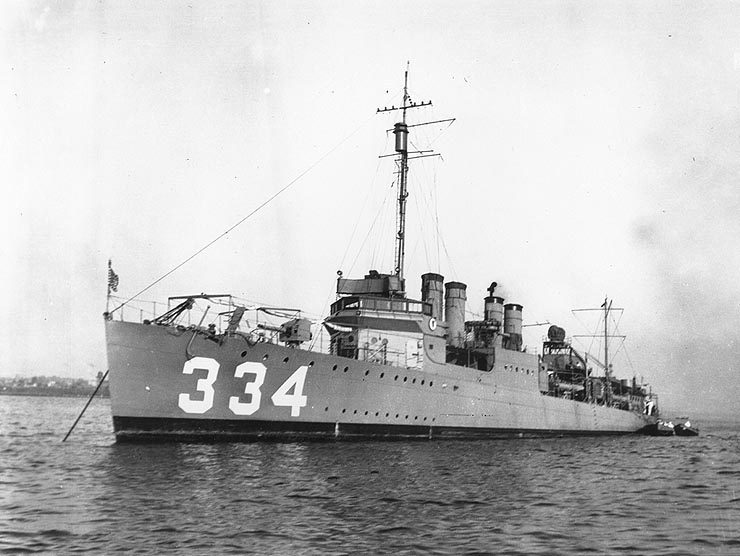
- USS Corry

History

United States
- Namesake: William M. Corry, Jr.
- Builder: Bethlehem Shipbuilding Corporation, Union Iron Works, San Francisco
- Laid down: 15 September 1919
- Launched: 28 March 1921
- Commissioned: 25 May 1921
- Decommissioned: 24 April 1930
- Stricken: 22 July 1930
- Fate: Sold for scrapping, 18 October 1930; remains still extant in the Napa River as of 2021

General characteristics
- Class & type: Clemson-class destroyer
- Displacement: 1,190 tons
- Length: 314 feet 4 inches (95.81 m)
- Beam: 31 feet 8 inches (9.65 m)
- Draft: 9 feet 3 inches (2.82 m)
- Propulsion: 26,500 shp (20 MW); geared turbines, 2 screws
- Speed: 35 knots (65 km/h)
- Range: 4,900 nmi (9,100 km); @ 15 kt
- Complement: 122 officers and enlisted
- Armament: 4 × 4 in (102 mm)/50 guns, 1 × 3 in (76 mm)/25 gun, 12 × 21 inch (533 mm) torpedo tubes

USS Corry (DD-334) was a United States Navy Clemson-class destroyer launched and commissioned in 1921.

== Overview ==
Corry was launched on 28 March 1921 by Bethlehem Shipbuilding Corporation, San Francisco; sponsored by Mrs. S. W. Corry; commissioned on 25 May 1921 and reported to the Pacific Fleet.

Corry cruised on the west coast on a varied operating schedule. She joined in fleet maneuvers, cruises from Alaska to the Caribbean, development and tests of sonic depth finders, antiaircraft gunnery, aircraft rescue and plane guard rehearsals. In July 1923 she joined Hull (DD-330) to serve as escort for President Warren G. Harding embarked in Henderson (AP-1) for a cruise to Alaskan and Canadian waters (during which President Harding came down with his last illness). She rejoined her division to participate in the American Legion convention at San Francisco in October 1923. On 8–9 September 1924, she embarked Secretary of the Navy Curtis D. Wilbur for a visit to Mare Island Navy Yard. From 28 August to 9 September 1925 she served as station ship during nonstop airplane flight from Hawaii to San Francisco.

In December 1929 Corry entered the San Diego Destroyer Base to prepare for decommissioning. She was towed to Mare Island Navy Yard and decommissioned 24 April 1930. She was stripped and sold for salvage 18 October 1930 in accordance with the terms of the London Treaty for the limitation of naval armament.

After being partially dismantled at the Mare Island Navy Yard, ex-USS Corry's remains, consisting of most of her hull and a small portion of her superstructure, were sold. Taken a short distance up the Napa River, about a mile from Mare Island, she was later abandoned where she lay.

== Naming ==
USS Corry was the first of three ships to be named after the late Lieutenant Commander William M. Corry, Jr. of USS Pennsylvania (Naval Aviator #23). LCDR Corry was a recipient of the Navy Cross and most notably the Medal of Honor.

== History ==
When the US declared war on the belligerents of World War I, it was necessary to create and implement a program to build destroyers in order to combat Germany's submarine fleet. The program that was applied to supplement the fleet of Lexington-class battlecruisers and Omaha-Class scout cruisers already being built by the United States Navy. The new fleet of destroyers being constructed would serve as high speed scouts, flank support, and observation platforms for convoys. Three classes of these destroyers were created, the Caldwell class, the Wickes class, and the Clemson class. Commonly misconceived, the construction of the Wickes-class and Clemson-class destroyers were not specifically built for World War I, but were mainly a result from the Naval Appropriation Act of 1916. The act called for a fleet capable of protecting both the Atlantic and Pacific coasts, and for protection from German U-boat attacks on military and supply convoys. Through the Naval Emergency Fund created in 1917, over 200 destroyers were added, one of which resulted in the creation of USS Corry.

== Build/class ==
USS Corry was a Clemson-class destroyer built by Union Iron Works, San Francisco, California. This was part of the last class of "flush-decker" destroyers to be built before World War II. They were also identified as "four-stackers" or "four-pipers" for the four notable smoke stacks on the destroyers. The Clemson-class destroyers are essentially Wickes-class destroyers with major improvements. It was addressed that Wickes-class destroyers would have trouble crossing the Atlantic – this led to the elimination of two boilers and the implementation of Yarrow boilers for the Clemson class. This design change from two boilers to Yarrow boilers was necessary in order to increase fuel capacity, thus increasing ship range. Doing so meant the Clemson-class destroyers had 100 tons of greater fuel capacity than the previous Wickes class. However, it was soon realized that even with this redesign, the altered destroyer plans were still not sufficient to allow crossing the Atlantic. The Navy had to bring forth other solutions, eventually settling on routine tanker-to-destroyer fuel transfers in the 1920s. The Clemson-class destroyers were also designed to fulfill an anti-submarine role more than anti-ship. This meant necessary change in maneuverability – leading to a larger rudder fitting as well as a more efficient hull form.

== Ship service ==
USS Corry was never sent to war due to Germany's collapse in 1918. The ship later served many different functions, joining fleet maneuvers, Presidential cruises, technological experimentation, and serving as an escort.

=== 1922 ===
In October 1922, USS Corry was fitted with a Hayes Sonic Depth Finder for testing. She spent the next few months off the coast of California charting the ocean floor with USS Hull. Covering 4,565 nautical miles (12,000 square miles), the pair surveyed the floor between San Francisco to Monterey Bay as well as Cape Deseanso to Santa Rosa Island in a 35-day period. USS Corry is responsible for discovering several uncharted banks, including an underwater mountain range – now known as the Southern California Continental Borderland.

=== 1923 ===
In March, after surveying the California Coast, USS Corry was ordered to survey the waterway approaches to the Panama Canal from both the Pacific and Atlantic oceans. When this was completed, she joined fleet exercises off Panama and out of San Diego. In June, she was selected to be part of the 36th Destroyer Division – serving as an escort for President Warren G. Harding on USS Henderson. This voyage from Alaska to Canadian waters consisted of stops in Metlakatla, Ketchikan, Juneau, Skagway, Seward, Valdez, Cordova, Sitka, and Vancouver, British Columbia.

== Fate ==
United States Navy Secretary Charles Francis Adams raised the issue to Congress that 60 Flush-Deckers were wearing out. The Navy could not justify the spending in the fiscal budget to refit all the ships. The "1930 Rehabilitation Program" was implemented, resulting in the decommissioning of 46 ships. The fleet was then sold and scrapped separately to generate revenue post the 1929 stock market crash. USS Corry was among that group, sold for scrap in 1930. After disarmament and deactivation, the ship was hauled to the Mare Island Naval Shipyard, but scrapping was halted after removing most of the superstructure and forward hull. The remains of the ship were then towed to be abandoned as a break wall in the Napa River (near the mouth of American Canyon Creek just north of Slaughterhouse Point) where she remains as of 2023.
