= Henry L. Hulbert =

US Marine Corps Medal of Honor recipient

Henry Lewis Hulbert
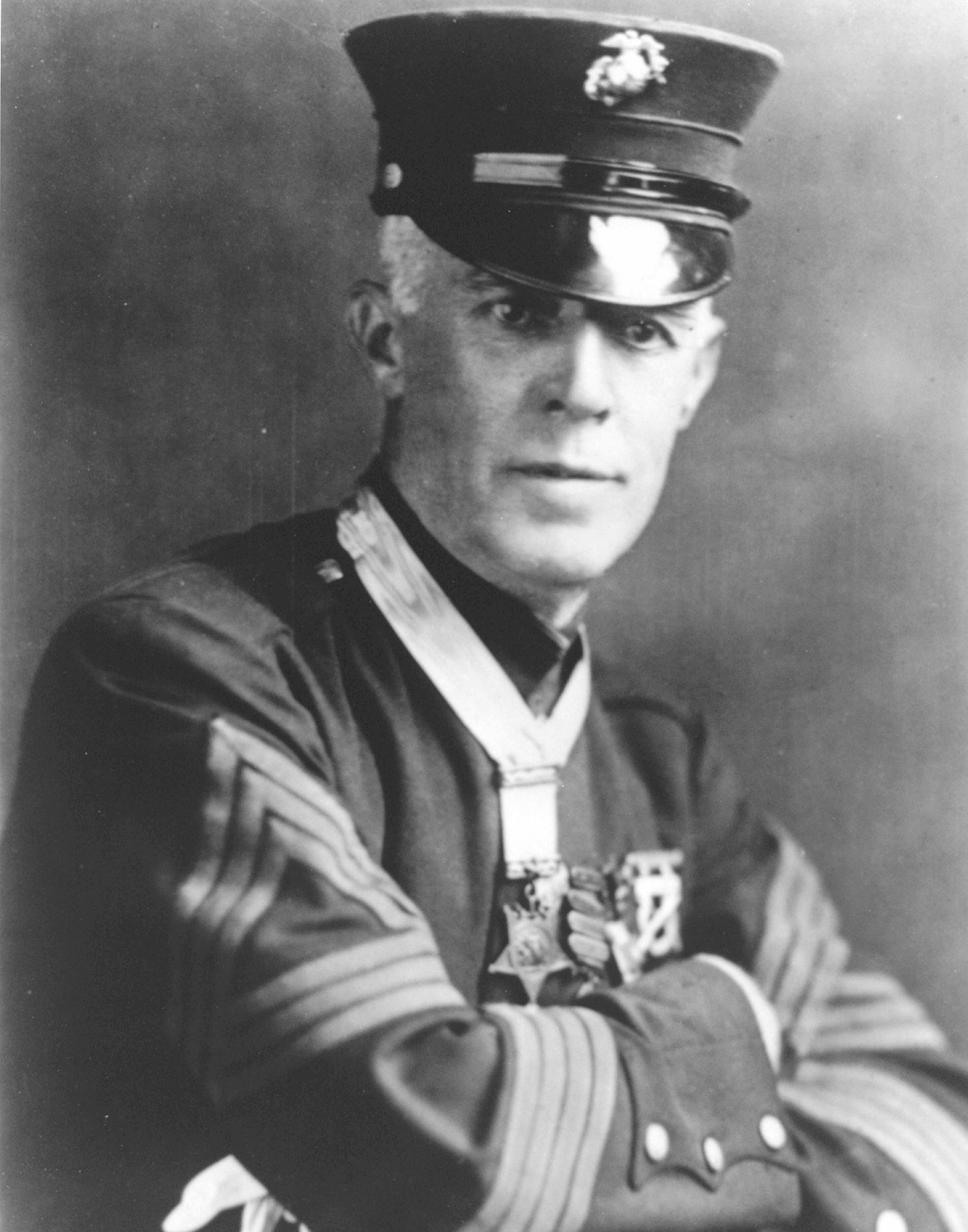
- Sergeant Major Henry Lewis Hulbert in c. 1917
- Born: 12 January 1867; Kingston upon Hull, England
- Died: 4 October 1918 (aged 51); Blanc Mont Ridge, France
- Burial place: Arlington National Cemetery
- Military career
- Allegiance: United States
- Branch: United States Marine Corps
- Service years: 1898–1918
- Rank: First lieutenant Captain (approved before death)
- Units: USS Philadelphia (C-4); 5th Marines
- Conflicts: Second Samoan Civil War: First Battle of Vailele; World War I: Battle of Belleau Wood; Battle of Château-Thierry; Battle of Blanc Mont Ridge †
- Awards: Medal of Honor; Navy Cross; Distinguished Service Cross; Purple Heart; Croix de guerre (France)

Henry Lewis Hulbert (12 January 1867 – 4 October 1918) was a United States Marine who served during the Second Samoan Civil War and World War I. As a private, he received the Medal of Honor for distinguished service in Samoa on 1 April 1899.

Hulbert was buried at Arlington National Cemetery, Arlington, Virginia. His grave can be found in Section 3 Lot 4309.

== Early years ==
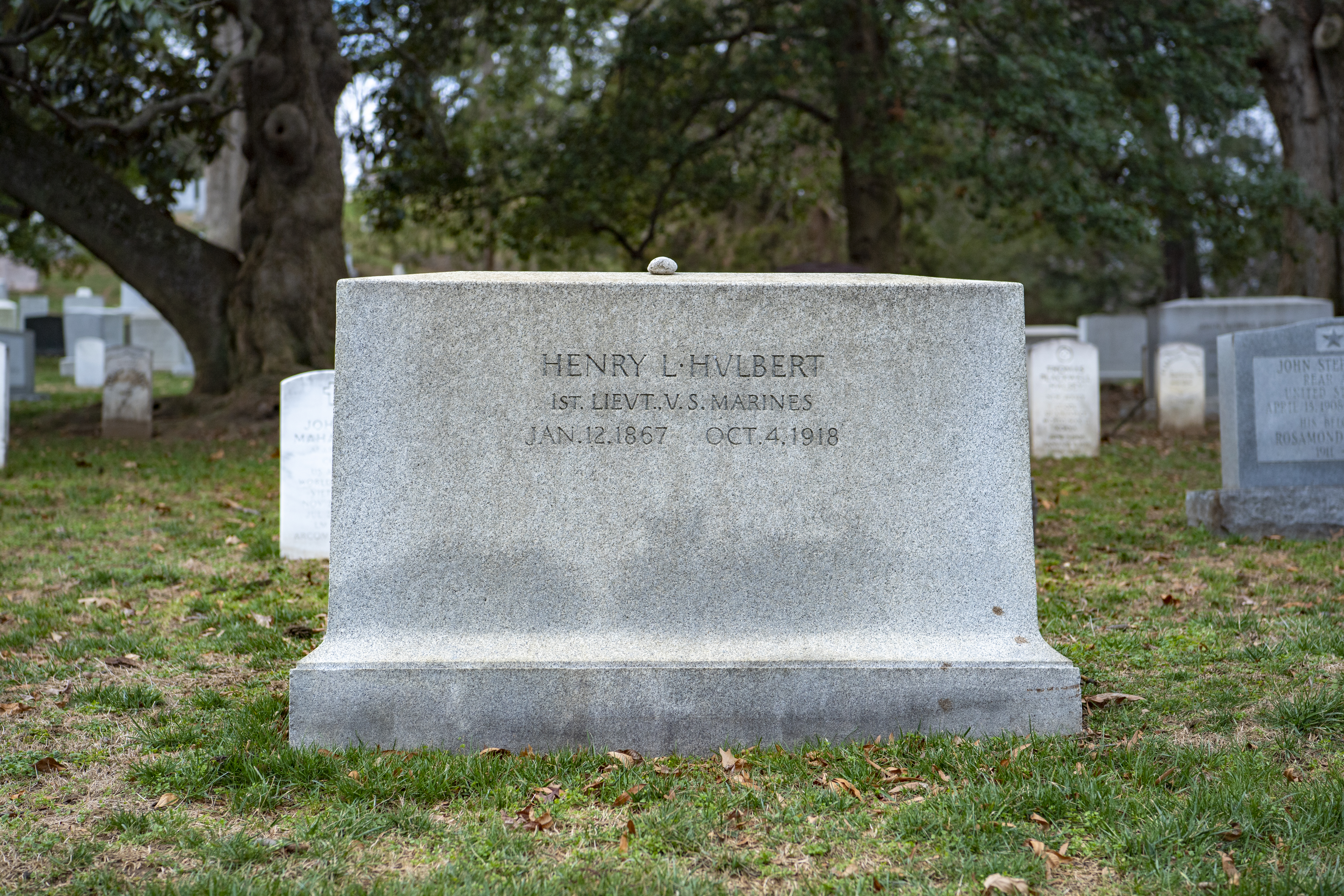
Grave at Arlington National Cemetery

Henry Lewis Hulbert was born in Kingston upon Hull, East Yorkshire, England on 12 January 1867. He was the first born into a prosperous family. He attended Felsted School in Essex, and entered the British Colonial Civil Service, with his first appointment in Malaya. While in Malaya, he married Anne Rose Hewitt. A subsequent personal scandal and divorce resulted in Hulbert leaving Malaysia and arriving in the United States. Later in life he resided in Riverdale Park, Maryland, near Washington, D.C. A small park on Cleveland Ave. there contains a cannon with a plaque dedicated to him.

== Second Samoan Civil War ==
At age 31, he enlisted in the United States Marine Corps on 28 March 1898. He completed his boot camp training at Mare Island, California. His first military action was the British and American expedition of intervention in Samoa. He was part of a 200-man force of Americans, Britons and Samoans which was defeated at the Second Battle of Vailele in 1899 during the Second Samoan Civil War. After the battle the soldierly qualities of Hulbert are best illustrated by the following quotation from a Letter of Commendation from the Secretary of the Navy dated 22 May 1899:

The gallantry of Private Henry L. Hulbert, who remained behind at the fence till the last and who was with Lansdale and Monaghan when they were killed, I desire especially to mention.

For this gallantry he was awarded the Medal of Honor.

== World War I ==
Photo of newly appointed Marine Gunner Henry L. Hulbert, USMC, Sixty-sixth Company, 1st Battalion, Fifth Regiment

By early 1917, Hulbert had reached the highest enlisted rank of sergeant major and was on the staff of Major General George Barnett, Commandant of the Marine Corps. Hulbert was second in the list of 20 "noncommissioned officers of the Marine Corps who successfully passed the recent examinations [and were] appointed to warrant rank and will take rank in the order named from 24 March 1917". The warrant rank was referred to as a Marine Gunner. Hulbert was assigned to the Fifth Regiment on 27 March 1917. He was some five months over the 50 years prescribed in the Annual Report by the Secretary of the Navy (1917):

Also, the provision that in making the temporary appointments as ensigns the maximum age limit shall be 50 years for commissioned warrant officers and warrant officers has prevented such appointments in the cases of a number of very deserving officers of those classes, and it is hoped that this restriction will be removed.

The United States entered World War I in April 1917. Upon the formation of the Fifth Regiment for service in France, Hulbert immediately volunteered for foreign service and the character of his service with the American Expeditionary Forces is best indicated by the following extracts from the endorsements of his commanding officers recommending him for promotion to commissioned rank:

- Commanding officer, Sixty-sixth Company: "I can not too strongly support Gunner Hulbert's request ... If the young lieutenants recently appointed had half of Mr. Hulbert's energy, professional knowledge, physical ability, or manner of handling men under him, the arduous duties which now devolve upon the average company commander would be materially simplified."
- Battalion commander, First Battalion, Fifth Regiment: "Gunner Hulbert has proven conclusively, while attached to this battalion, that he is physically and professionally qualified to perform the duties of a commissioned officer. Nervously active, ambitious, zealous, always ready to help with valuable advice and original ideas, he is undoubtedly one of the most efficient officers in the service to-day."
- Adjutant, First Battalion, Fifth Regiment: "As a young officer new to the service, I wish to state that Mr. Hulbert has helped me a great deal ... I served in the same company with Mr. Hulbert and will not hesitate to say that he can hold his own with the younger officers from a physical standpoint ... If the Fifth Regiment ever goes over the top I want to go over with Mr. Hulbert."
- Regimental commander: "Marine Gunner Hulbert, United States Marine Corps, has given excellent service since I assumed command of this regiment. His energy, ability, and length of service merits his promotion to the rank of second lieutenant."

=== Battle of Belleau Wood ===
Hulbert was recognized for multiple acts of bravery during the Battle of Belleau Wood. For one such action, he was awarded the Distinguished Service Cross. He was recommended by General John J. Pershing for immediate commission as a captain.

=== Soissons and Blanc Mont Ridge ===
He distinguished himself at Soisson, was commissioned second lieutenant, and received an immediate promotion to first lieutenant. He was killed in action at Blanc Mont Ridge in France on 4 October 1918. At the time of his death, his promotion to captain had been approved by the Secretary of the Navy. He was posthumously awarded the Navy Cross and the French Croix de Guerre with palm.

== Awards and honors ==
Hulbert received the following medals for his distinguished military service:

Medal of Honor
Navy Cross
Distinguished Service Cross
Purple Heart
Croix de guerre (France)

Hulbert was also eligible for the Marine Corps Expeditionary Medal, Spanish Campaign Medal, and the World War I Victory Medal.

The U.S. Navy destroyer USS Hulbert (DD-342), named in Hulbert's honor, was christened on 28 June 1919, and commissioned and put into service in 1920. The destroyer was moored in Pearl Harbor on 7 December 1941 and brought down a Japanese torpedo bomber. The Hulbert was decommissioned in 1945.

== See also ==
- List of Medal of Honor recipients
