= USS Thompson (DD-305) =

Clemson-class destroyer

Coordinates: 37°33′10″N 122°09′27″W

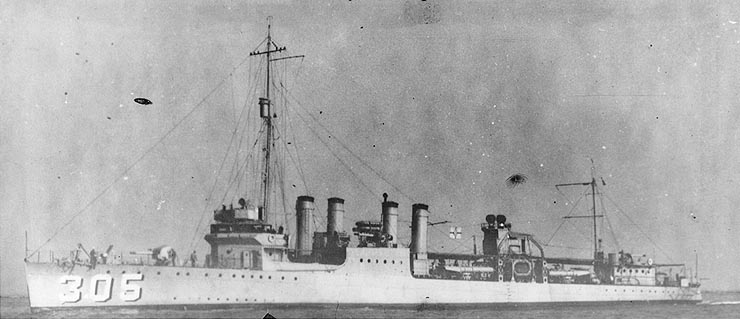
- USS Thompson, during the middle or later 1920s

History

United States
- Name: Thompson
- Namesake: Richard W. Thompson
- Builder: Bethlehem Shipbuilding Corporation, Union Iron Works, San Francisco
- Laid down: 25 September 1918
- Launched: 15 January 1919
- Commissioned: 16 August 1920
- Decommissioned: 4 April 1930
- Stricken: 22 June 1930
- Fate: Sunk as target, February 1944

General characteristics
- Class & type: Clemson-class destroyer
- Displacement: 1,308 tons
- Length: 314 ft 4 in (95.8 m)
- Beam: 30 ft 11 in (9.4 m)
- Draft: 9 ft 10 in (3.0 m)
- Propulsion: 26,500 shp (19,800 kW); geared turbines, twin propellers
- Speed: 35 knots (65 km/h; 40 mph)
- Range: 4,900 nmi (9,100 km; 5,600 mi) at 15 kn (28 km/h; 17 mph)
- Complement: 122 officers and enlisted
- Armament: 4 × 4 in (102 mm) guns, 1 × 3 in (76 mm) gun, 12 × 21 in (533 mm) torpedo tubes

USS Thompson (DD-305), a Clemson-class destroyer of the U.S. Navy named in honor of Secretary of the Navy Richard W. Thompson (1809–1900), never saw action against an enemy. She was the first Navy ship of that name; the second, Thompson (DD-627), named for Robert M. Thompson, served during World War II and the Korean War.

== History ==
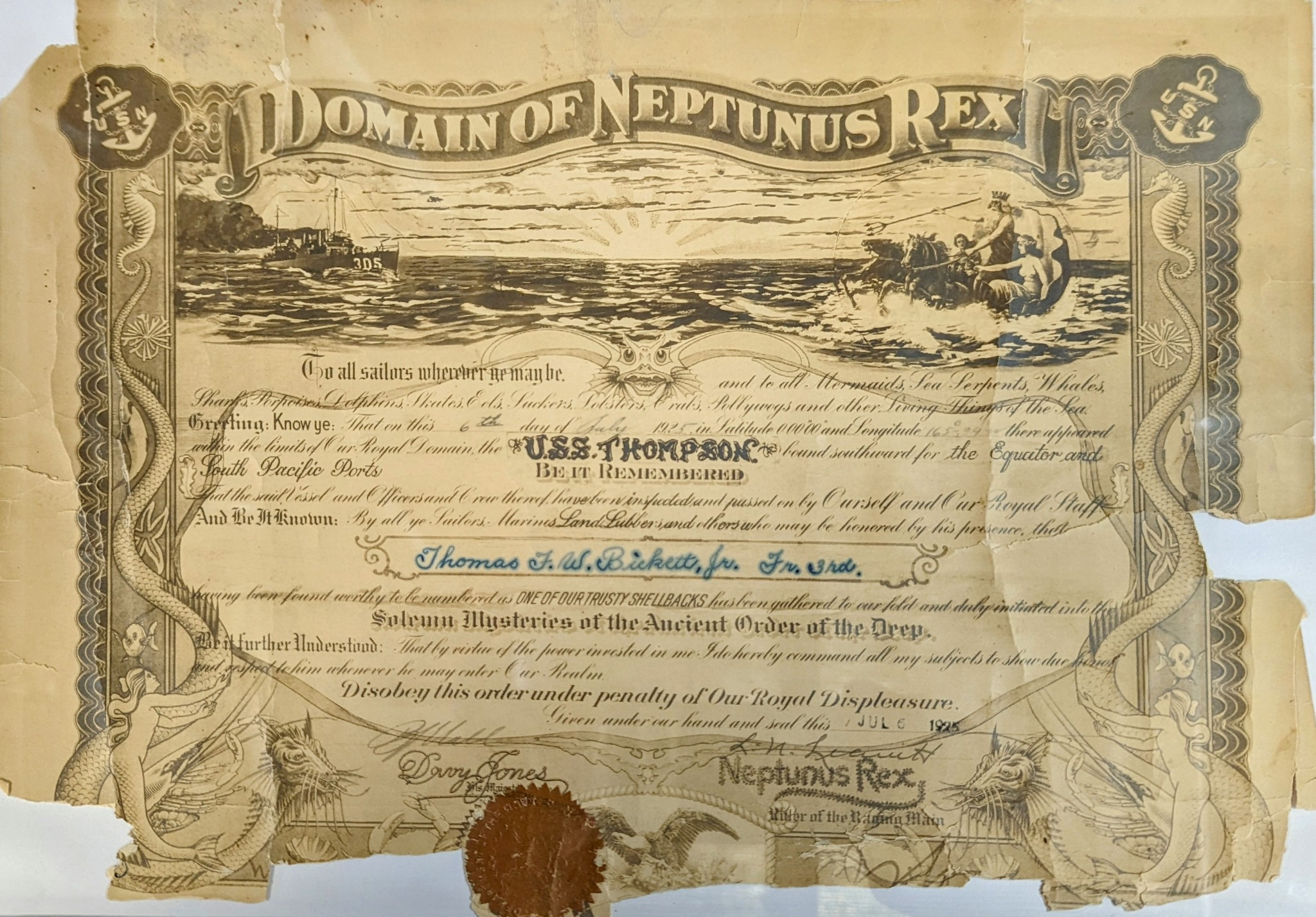
Domain of Neptunus Rex, USS Thompson, presented to sailor Thomas Bickett Jr, 6 July 1925.

The keel of the first Thompson was laid down on 25 September 1918, at San Francisco, by the Bethlehem Steel Corporation. She was launched on 15 January 1919, sponsored by Mrs. Herbert H. Harris, and was commissioned at the Mare Island Naval Shipyard, Vallejo, California, on 16 August 1920.

On 4 September, Thompson departed San Francisco for a shakedown training cruise which took her as far southward as Magdalena Bay in Baja California Sur. She returned to San Diego, on 29 September, to operate with the Battle Fleet as part of Destroyer Division (DesDiv) 32, Destroyer Squadron (DesRon) 11. After initial fleet operations off the west coast, Thompson departed from San Diego on 7 January 1921, to take part in fleet maneuvers off Panama and later off the Chilean coast, south of Valparaíso.

Departing from Valparaíso on 4 February, she steamed with DesDiv 32 to Balboa, Canal Zone, and thence to La Unión, El Salvador. Departing that port on 27 February, she proceeded north and soon resumed operations out of San Diego. Her cruises ranged as far north as Seattle, Washington.

Following her return from exercises to the northward on 21 June she operated off the California coast. On 10 December she departed San Diego and steamed to the Puget Sound Naval Shipyard, Bremerton, Washington, for regular overhaul.

Upon completion of the refit, Thompson headed for San Diego on 8 February 1922, for resumption of operations with the Battle Fleet. In the following years, she worked out of San Diego and took part in winter and spring maneuvers off Panama, on occasion transiting the Panama Canal for fleet exercises in the Caribbean Sea.

On 15 April 1926, Thompson steamed with the Fleet from San Francisco for fleet problems in Hawaiian waters. Upon completion of this training on 1 July she departed Pearl Harbor with the Fleet, bound for a goodwill cruise to Australia and New Zealand. After calling at Pago Pago, Samoa, on 10 and 11 July, she arrived in Melbourne on 23 July. In company with sister ships Kennedy, Decatur, and Farquhar, Thompson left Melbourne on 6 August and made port at Dunedin, New Zealand, four days later.

Putting out to sea after a 10-day visit there, Thompson visited Wellington from 22 to 24 August. She then proceeded home across the Pacific, via Pago Pago and Pearl Harbor, and reached San Diego on 26 September.

For the remainder of her career, Thompson continued her operations with DesDiv 32, DesRon 11. Early the next year, she made a brief visit to the east coast, calling at Norfolk, Virginia, Newport, Rhode Island, and New York City, before returning to San Diego and serving out the rest of her days in operations along the west coast.

Under the terms of the 1930 London Naval Treaty limiting naval tonnage and armaments, Thompson was decommissioned on 4 April 1930, struck from the Naval Vessel Register on 22 June 1930; and sold for scrap on 10 June.

== Fate ==
Following her sale, she served as a floating restaurant in lower San Francisco Bay during the depression years of the 1930s. In February 1944, the Navy repurchased the ship and partly sank her in the mud flats of San Francisco Bay, south of the San Mateo Bridge, where Army and Navy aircraft carried out bombing runs with dummy bombs.

Portions of the wreck remain above the waterline to this day. She is commonly referred to as the "South Bay Wreck" and many tide tables reference her as a calculation point.
