= USS Mervine (DD-322) =

Clemson-class destroyer

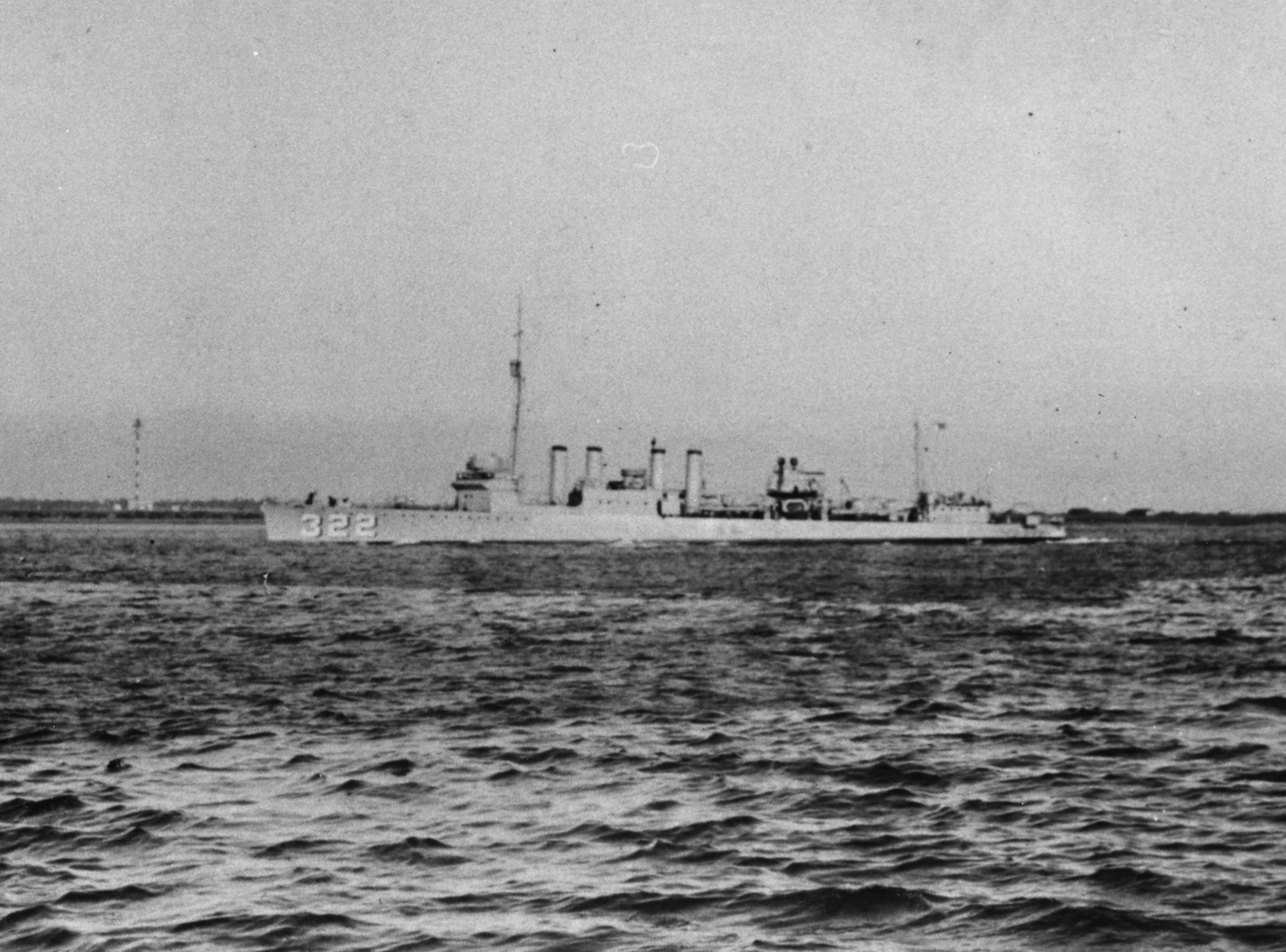

History

United States
- Namesake: William Mervine
- Builder: Bethlehem Shipbuilding Corporation, Union Iron Works, San Francisco
- Laid down: 28 April 1919
- Launched: 11 August 1919
- Commissioned: 28 February 1921
- Decommissioned: 4 June 1930
- Stricken: 3 November 1930
- Fate: Sold for scrap, 1930

General characteristics
- Class & type: Clemson-class destroyer
- Displacement: 1,290 long tons (1,311 t) (standard); 1,389 long tons (1,411 t) (deep load)
- Length: 314 ft 4 in (95.8 m)
- Beam: 30 ft 11 in (9.42 m)
- Draught: 10 ft 3 in (3.1 m)
- Installed power: 27,000 shp (20,000 kW); 4 water-tube boilers
- Propulsion: 2 shafts, 2 steam turbines
- Speed: 35 knots (65 km/h; 40 mph) (design)
- Range: 2,500 nautical miles (4,600 km; 2,900 mi) at 20 knots (37 km/h; 23 mph) (design)
- Complement: 6 officers, 108 enlisted men
- Armament: 4 × single 4-inch (102 mm) guns; 2 × single 1-pounder AA guns or; 2 × single 3-inch (76 mm) guns; 4 × triple 21 inch (533 mm) torpedo tubes; 2 × depth charge rails

USS Mervine (DD-322) was a Clemson-class destroyer in service with the United States Navy from 1921 to 1930. She was scrapped in 1931.

== Description ==
The Clemson class was a repeat of the preceding Wickes class although more fuel capacity was added. The ships displaced 1,290 long tons (1,311 t) at standard load and 1,389 long tons (1,411 t) at deep load. They had an overall length of 314 feet 4 inches (95.8 m), a beam of 30 feet 11 inches (9.4 m) and a draught of 10 feet 3 inches (3.1 m). They had a crew of 6 officers and 108 enlisted men.

Performance differed radically between the ships of the class, often due to poor workmanship. The Clemson class was powered by two steam turbines, each driving one propeller shaft, using steam provided by four water-tube boilers. The turbines were designed to produce a total of 27,000 shaft horsepower (20,000 kW) intended to reach a speed of 35 knots (65 km/h; 40 mph). The ships carried a maximum of 371 long tons (377 t) of fuel oil which was intended to give these a range of 2,500 nautical miles (4,600 km; 2,900 mi) at 20 knots (37 km/h; 23 mph).

The ships were armed with four 4-inch (102 mm) guns in single mounts and were fitted with two 1-pounder guns for anti-aircraft defense. In many ships a shortage of 1-pounders caused them to be replaced by 3-inch (76 mm) guns. Their primary weapon, though, was their torpedo battery of a dozen 21 inch (533 mm) torpedo tubes in four triple mounts. They also carried a pair of depth charge rails. A "Y-gun" depth charge thrower was added to many ships.

== Construction and career ==
Mervine, named for Rear Admiral William Mervine, was laid down at the Union Plant, Bethlehem Shipbuilding Corporation, San Francisco, California, 28 April 1919; launched 11 August 1919; sponsored by Miss Eileen D. McCarthy; and commissioned 28 February 1921. Mervine, built on the west coast, joined the Pacific Fleet at San Diego, California after shakedown to remain a unit of that fleet’s destroyer force for her entire career. With few interruptions she operated off the west coast for most of that 9-year period. Her participation in Fleet Problems I (1923) and II, III, and IV (1924) took her to the Panama Canal Zone and the Caribbean, while others, VI (1926), VII (1928), and IX (1929), saw her in maneuvers off Central America and near Hawaii. Crossing the Pacific only twice in her career, she completed a good will trip to Samoa and Australia in the summer of 1925 (1 July to 26 September).

On 18 September 1929 she entered San Diego for the last time. Decommissioned 4 June 1930, she was towed to Mare Island on the 14th for scrapping and struck from the Naval Register 3 November 1930.
