= USS Hull (DD-330) =

Clemson-class destroyer

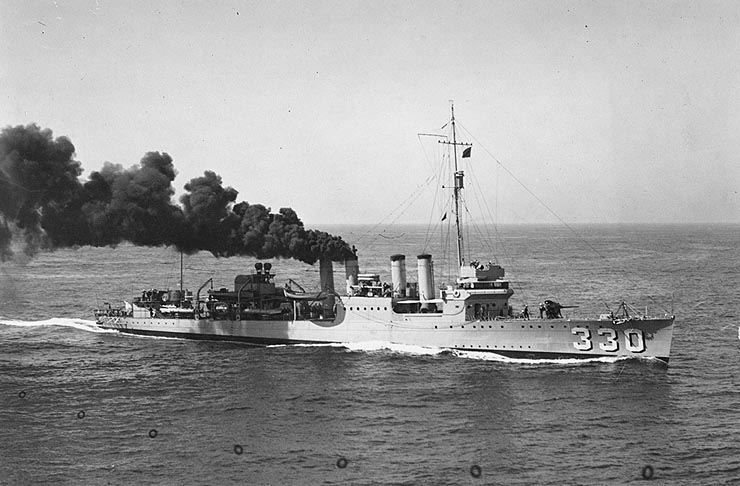
- USS Hull

History

United States
- Namesake: Isaac Hull
- Builder: Bethlehem Shipbuilding Corporation, Union Iron Works, San Francisco
- Laid down: 13 September 1920
- Launched: 18 February 1921
- Commissioned: 26 April 1921
- Decommissioned: 31 March 1930
- Stricken: 22 July 1930
- Fate: Sold for scrap, 10 June 1931

General characteristics
- Class & type: Clemson-class destroyer
- Displacement: 1,190 tons (1,210 t)
- Length: 314 feet 5 inches (95.83 m)
- Beam: 31 feet 8 inches (9.65 m)
- Draft: 9 feet 3 inches (2.82 m)
- Propulsion: 26,500 shp (20 MW); geared turbines, twin propellers
- Speed: 35 knots (65 km/h)
- Range: 4,900 nmi (9,100 km); @ 15 kt
- Complement: 122 officers and enlisted
- Armament: 4 × 4 in (102 mm)/50 guns, 1 × 3 in (76 mm)/25 gun, 12 × 21 inch (533 mm) torpedo tubes

The second USS Hull (DD-330) was a Clemson-class destroyer in the United States Navy following World War I. She was named for Isaac Hull.

== History ==
Hull was launched by Bethlehem Shipbuilding Corporation, San Francisco, California, 18 February 1921; sponsored by Miss Elizabeth Hull; and commissioned 26 April 1921.

Following shakedown along the California coast, Hull engaged in operations and tactical exercises out of San Diego, California for the remainder of the year. During 1922, she took part in charting and sounding operations along the coast of southern California. The sounding operations used the newly developed sonic depth sounder. The Carnegie Institution sponsored this charting and sounding project for the purpose of earthquake research. Upon completion of winter maneuvers off Panama and training exercises out of San Diego, Hull sailed 28 June 1923 to act as escort vessel on President Warren G. Harding's trip to Alaska. It was on this voyage that the President was taken ill, and he died in San Francisco 2 August. The destroyer returned to San Diego 8 September and resumed operations and exercises in that area.

Hull sailed 2 January 1924, for operations in the Caribbean, which included a visit to Veracruz, Mexico, to protect American lives and property. In April the ship steamed to Seattle, Washington, and operated between that city and Seward, Alaska, taking soundings for the new Alaskan cable. Upon her return in early May Hull resumed operations along the coast.

The destroyer continued to operate out of San Diego with occasional voyages to Panama until 1927. She then sailed in company with the Battle Fleet 17 November for tactical maneuvers in the Caribbean. Hull visited New York before returning to San Diego 26 June to resume her training operations.

== Fate ==
The ship arrived at Mare Island 11 June 1929 for overhaul, and returned to San Diego in October, where she decommissioned 31 March 1930. Hull was sold for scrap 10 June 1931, in accordance with the London Treaty of 1930.

The bell, however, was saved and made its way to Marquette University in Milwaukee, WI where it was rung by the band to start football games. Since Marquette no longer has a football team, the bell was decommissioned and now is in storage.
