= William M. Corry Jr. =

United States Navy officer and Medal of Honor recipient

William Merrill Corry Jr.
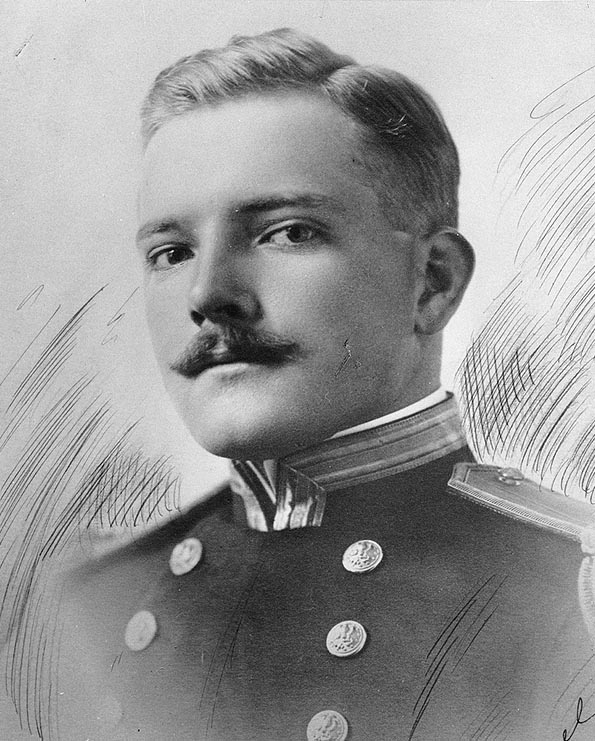
- William Merrill Corry Jr., USN (1889-1920)
- Born: October 5, 1889; Quincy, Florida
- Died: October 6, 1920 (aged 31); Hartford, Connecticut
- Burial place: Eastern Cemetery Quincy Florida
- Military career
- Allegiance: United States of America
- Branch: United States Navy
- Service years: 1910–1920
- Rank: Lieutenant commander
- Units: Northern Bombing Group; USS Pennsylvania
- Conflicts: World War I
- Awards: Medal of Honor; Navy Cross

William Merrill Corry Jr. (October 5, 1889 – October 6, 1920) was a lieutenant commander in the United States Navy during World War I and a recipient of the Medal of Honor.

== Biography ==
Corry was born at Quincy, Florida. Admitted to the Naval Academy in June 1906, he graduated in 1910 and spent the next five years serving in the battleship USS Kansas. In mid-1915, Lieutenant (Junior Grade) Corry began instruction in aviation at Pensacola, Florida, and was designated Naval Aviator #23 in March 1916. He had flying positions with the armored cruiser USS Washington between November 1916 and May 1917, then was an officer on the armored cruiser USS North Carolina.

In August 1917, Lieutenant Corry began World War I service in France, where he commanded Naval Air Stations at Le Croisic and Brest during 1918 and early 1919. He was promoted to lieutenant commander in July 1918 and received Navy Cross for his service with Northern Bombing Group. Corry remained in France for the rest of 1919 and the first half of 1920, involved in removing U.S. Naval Aviation forces from Europe as part of the post-war demobilization.

In mid-1920, Lieutenant Commander Corry was assigned as aviation aide to the Commander-in-Chief, Atlantic Fleet, stationed on the Fleet's flagship, USS Pennsylvania. On October 2, 1920, he was a passenger on a flight from Long Island, New York. The airplane crashed near Hartford, Connecticut. Though thrown clear of the wreckage, the injured Corry ran back to pull the pilot free of the flaming aircraft. Fatally burned during this rescue, William M. Corry died at Hartford on October 6. He posthumously received the Medal of Honor for his heroism.

He is buried in Eastern Cemetery, Quincy, Florida.

== Namesake ==
Airfields at Pensacola, Florida (now Naval Air Station Pensacola, Center for Information Dominance Corry Station - and Naval Information Operations Command Pensacola tenant command), and three ships have been named USS Corry in his honor.

== Medal of Honor citation ==
Rank and organization: Lieutenant Commander, U.S. Navy. Place and date: Near Hartford, Conn., October 2, 1920. Born: October 5, 1889, Quincy, Fla. Accredited to: Florida. Other Navy award: Navy Cross.

Citation:

For heroic service in attempting to rescue a brother officer from a flame-enveloped airplane. On 2 October 1920, an airplane in which Lt. Comdr. William Corry was a passenger crashed and burst into flames. Will was thrown 30 feet clear of the plane and, though injured, rushed back to the burning machine and endeavored to release the pilot. In so doing Will sustained serious burns, from which he died 4 days later.

== See also ==
- List of Medal of Honor recipients during peacetime
