= USS Graham =

Clemson-class destroyer

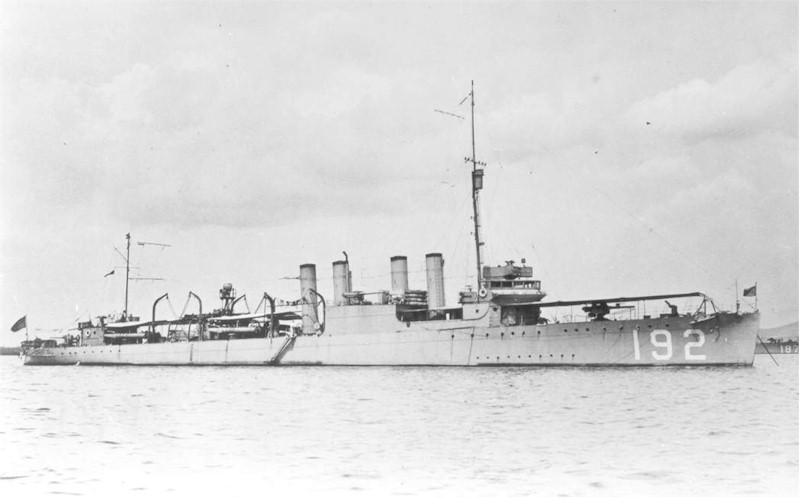
- USS Graham

History

United States
- Namesake: William A. Graham
- Builder: Newport News Shipbuilding & Dry Dock Company
- Cost: $1,750,000 (equ. to $32,000,000 today)
- Laid down: 7 September 1918
- Launched: 22 March 1919
- Commissioned: 13 March 1920
- Decommissioned: 31 March 1922
- Stricken: 4 May 1922
- Fate: Sold for scrap, 19 September 1922

General characteristics
- Class & type: Clemson-class destroyer
- Displacement: 1,215 tons
- Length: 310 ft (94 m)
- Beam: 30 ft 11 1/2 in (9.436 m)
- Draft: 9 ft 4 in (2.84 m)
- Propulsion: 26,500 SHP (20 MW); geared turbines, 2 screws
- Speed: 35 kn (65 km/h)
- Range: 4,900 nmi (9,100 km); @ 15 kt
- Complement: 122 officers and enlisted
- Armament: 4 × 4 in (100 mm), 1 × 3 in (76 mm), 12 × 21 inch (533 mm) torpedo tubes.

USS Graham (DD-192) was a Clemson-class destroyer in the United States Navy during World War I. She was named for Secretary of the Navy William A. Graham (1804–1875).

== History ==
Graham was launched 22 March 1919 by the Newport News Shipbuilding & Dry Dock Company, Newport News, Virginia, sponsored by Mrs. Robert F. Smallwood, granddaughter of Secretary Graham; and commissioned at Norfolk Navy Yard, 13 March 1920. Her build cost was $1,750,000 (equivalent to $32,000,000 in 2025).

Assigned to the Atlantic Fleet, after several trial runs on East Coast, Graham was at first given the special duty, together with two other U.S. destroyers, of a moving picture boat carrying the moving picture photographers, in connection with the International Cup Race, under the auspices of the New York Yacht Club, beginning 15 July 1920 and on alternate days thereafter until 27 July when the Race was completed.

Graham then joined the Atlantic Torpedo Fleet at Newport, Rhode Island, for exercises and training along the east coast, and for Neutrality Patrol and exercises off Guantanamo Bay and in the Panama Canal Zone. In 1921, she participated in combined division, squadron and fleet maneuvers off South America, visiting Callao, Peru, and Balboa, Canal Zone, before returning to Hampton Roads. There she took part in the Presidential Fleet Review at Norfolk, Virginia, in April 1921. She also participated in the bombing tests on former German ships off the Virginia coast that summer. On 27 October, in company with the 20th Division, she escorted S.S. Paris, on which General Foch was a passenger, to New York, and convoyed that ship up Ambrose Channel, New York. Then she commenced antiaircraft practice. On 12 November 1921 she had a change of status from operative commission to reduced complement. She was en route to New York from Charleston, South Carolina, when on 16 December she collided with SS Panama off the New Jersey coast and had to return to New York.

Graham decommissioned at New York Navy Yard 31 March 1922, and was sold for scrapping, 19 September 1922.

As of 2005, no other U.S. Navy ship has been named Graham.
