= Clemson-class destroyer =

Destroyer class of the US Navy

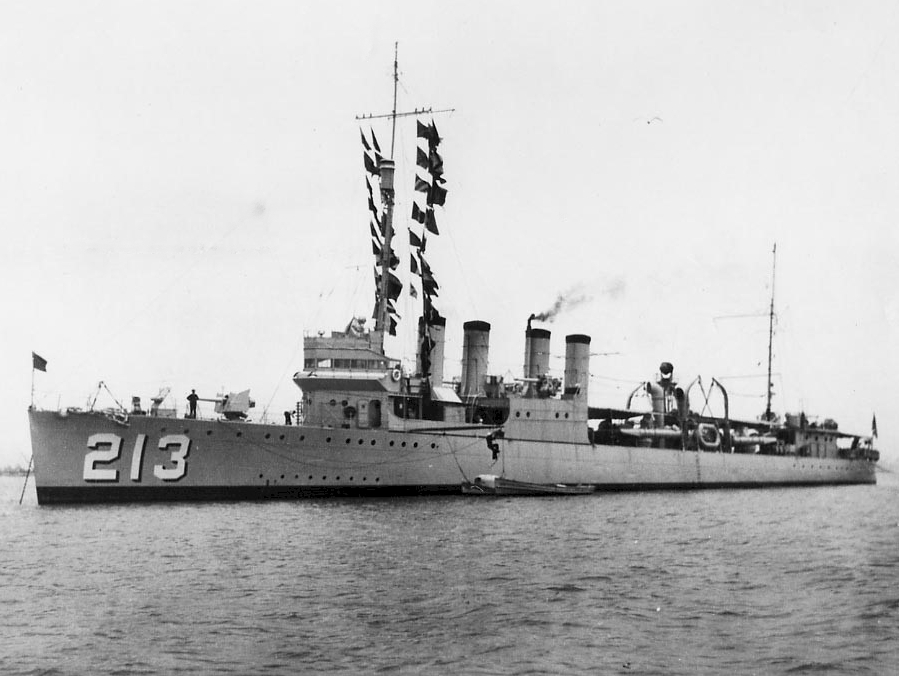
- USS Barker in 1928

Class overview
- Name: Clemson class
- Builders: Bethlehem; Fore River Shipyard, MA (10); Squantum Victory Yard, MA (35); San Franscisco, CA (40); William Cramp & Sons, PA (25); New York Ship, NY (20); Newport News Shipbuilding, VA (14); Mare Island Naval Shipyard, CA (6); Norfolk Naval Shipyard, VA (3); Bath Iron Works, ME (3)
- Operators: United States Navy; United States Coast Guard; Royal Navy; Royal Canadian Navy; Soviet Navy; Imperial Japanese Navy
- Preceded by: Wickes class
- Succeeded by: Farragut class
- Subclasses: Town class
- Built: 1918–1922
- In service: 1919–1948
- Planned: 162
- Completed: 156
- Canceled: 6 (DD-200 to DD-205)
- Lost: 20

General characteristics
- Type: Destroyer
- Displacement: 1,215 tons (normal); 1,308 tons (full load)
- Length: 314 ft 4.5 in (95.822 m)
- Beam: 30 ft 11.5 in (9.436 m)
- Draft: 9 ft 4 in (2.84 m)
- Propulsion: 4 × boilers, 300 psi (2,100 kPa) saturated steam; 2 geared steam turbines; 27,600 hp (20,600 kW); 2 shafts
- Speed: 35.5 knots (65.7 km/h; 40.9 mph)
- Range: 4,900 nmi (9,100 km); @ 15 kn (28 km/h)
- Crew: 8 officers; 8 chief petty officers; 106 enlisted
- Armament: 4 × 4-inch/50 caliber guns (102 mm); 1 × 3-inch/23 caliber gun (76 mm) (anti-aircraft); 12 × 21-inch torpedo tubes (4 × 3) (533 mm)

The Clemson class was a series of 156 destroyers (six more were cancelled and never begun) built at the end of World War I, the majority of which served with the United States Navy from after World War I and through World War II.

The Clemson-class ships were commissioned by the United States Navy from 1919 to 1922, built by Newport News Shipbuilding & Dry Dock Company, New York Shipbuilding Corporation, William Cramp & Sons, Bethlehem Steel Corporation, Mare Island Naval Shipyard, Norfolk Naval Shipyard and Bath Iron Works, some quite rapidly. The Clemson class was a minor redesign of the Wickes class for greater fuel capacity and was the last pre-World War II class of flush-deck destroyers to be built for the United States. Until the Fletcher-class destroyer, the Clemsons were the most numerous class of destroyers commissioned in the United States Navy and were known colloquially as "flush-deckers", "four-stackers" or "four-pipers".

== Design evolution ==
As finally built, the Clemson class would be a fairly straightforward expansion of the Wickes-class destroyers. While the Wickes class had given good service there was a desire to build a class more tailored towards the anti-submarine role, and as such several design studies were completed, mainly about increasing the ships' range. These designs included a reduction in speed to between 26–28 knots (48–52 km/h; 30–32 mph) by eliminating two boilers, freeing up displacement for depth charges and more fuel. This proposal foreshadowed the destroyer escorts of World War II.

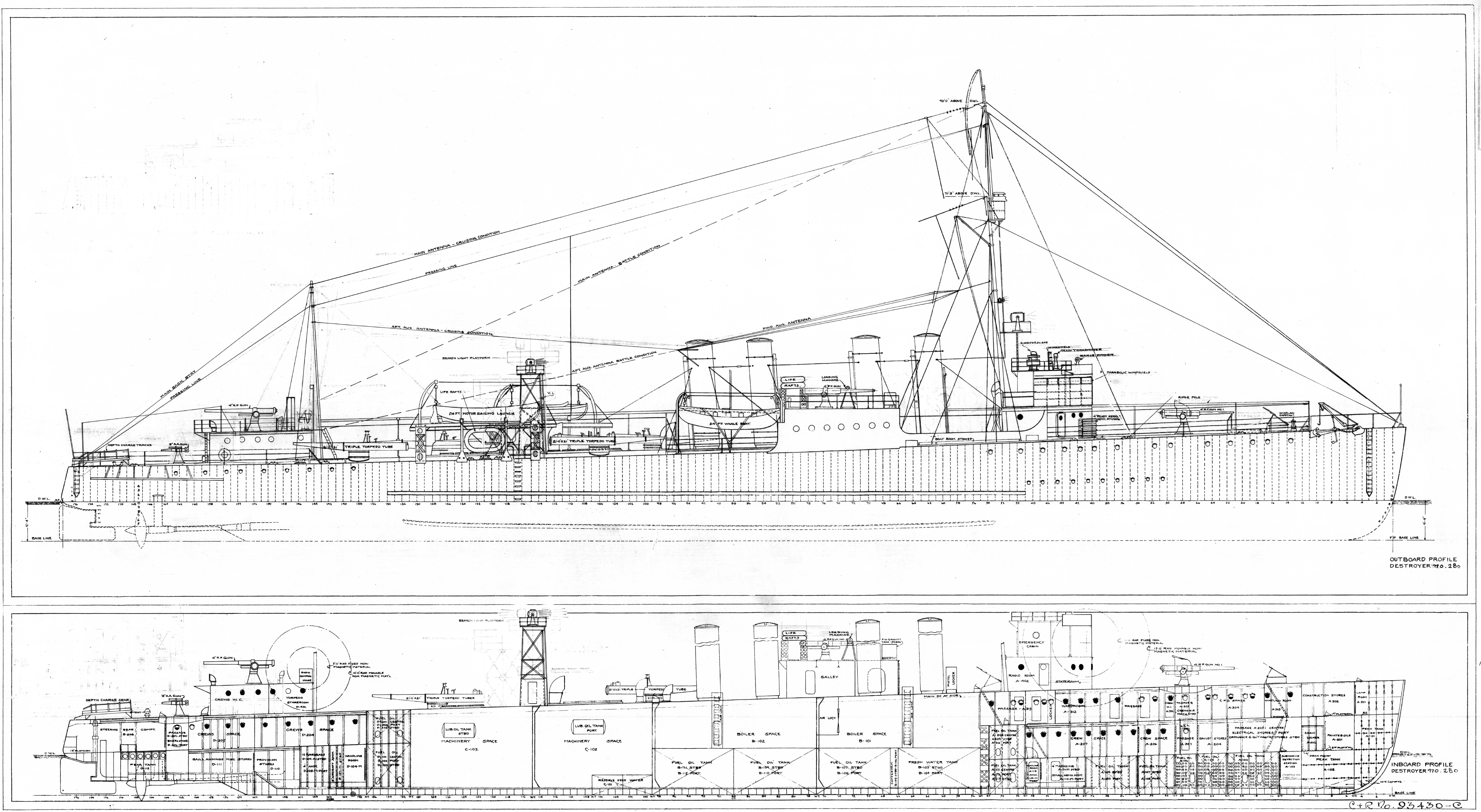

Upgrading the gun armament from 4-inch (102 mm) to 5-inch (127 mm) guns was also considered, but only five ships (DD-231 to DD-235) were armed with 5-inch guns. In addition, the tapered stern of the Wickes-class destroyers resulted in a large turning radius and a correction to this defect was also sought, although this was not corrected in the final design. In the end the General Board decided the 35 knots (65 km/h; 40 mph) speed be retained so as to allow the Clemson class to be used as a fleet escort. The pressing need for destroyers overruled any change that would slow production compared to the proceeding Wickes class. Wing tanks for fuel oil were installed on either side of the ships to increase the operational range. This design choice meant the fuel oil would be stored above the waterline and create additional vulnerability, but the Navy felt a 4,900-nautical-mile (9,100 km; 5,600 mi) range was worth the risk. Additional improvements included provisions for 5-inch guns to be installed at a later date, an enlarged rudder to help reduce the turn radius, and an additional 3-inch (76 mm) anti-aircraft gun on the after deck-house.

The class resulted from a General Board recommendation for further destroyers to combat the submarine threat, culminating in a total of 267 Wickes- and Clemson-class destroyers completed. However, the design of the ships remained optimized for operation with the battleship fleet.

== Armament ==
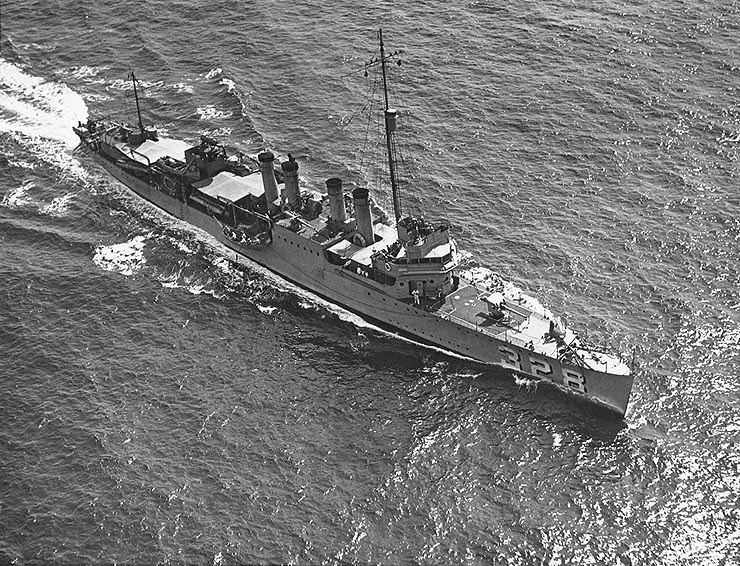
Overhead view of USS Lamson

The main armament was the same as the Wickes class: four 4-inch (102 mm)/50 caliber guns and twelve 21-inch (533 mm) torpedo tubes. The Mark 8 torpedo was initially equipped, and probably remained the standard torpedo for this class, as 600 Mark 8 torpedoes were issued to the British in 1940 as part of the Destroyers for Bases Agreement.

Although the design provided for two anti-aircraft (AA) guns, most ships carried a single 3-inch (76 mm)/23 caliber AA gun, typically on the aft deckhouse. A frequent modification was replacing the aft 4-inch gun with the 3-inch gun to make more room for the depth charge tracks. Anti-submarine (ASW) armament was added during or after construction. Typically, two depth charge tracks were provided aft, along with a Y-gun depth charge projector forward of the aft deckhouse.

Despite the provision for 5-inch guns, only seven ships were built with an increased gun armament. USS Hovey and USS Long had twin 4-inch/50 mounts for a total of eight guns, while DD 231–235 had four 5-inch (127 mm)/51 caliber guns in place of the 4-inch guns.

== In operation ==
As with the preceding Wickes class, the fleet found that the tapered cruiser stern, which made for a nice depth charge deployment feature, dug into the water and increased the turning radius, thus hampering anti-submarine work. While an increased rudder size helped, the answer would be in a redesigned stern, but this was not implemented. They were reported to be prone to heavy rolling in light load conditions. The flush deck gave the hull great strength but this also made the deck very wet.

== Ships in class ==
156 Clemson-class destroyers were built (with hull numbers DD 186 to 199 and DD 206 to 347), with an additional six (DD 200 to 205) cancelled.

== History ==
The Honda Point Disaster 1923.

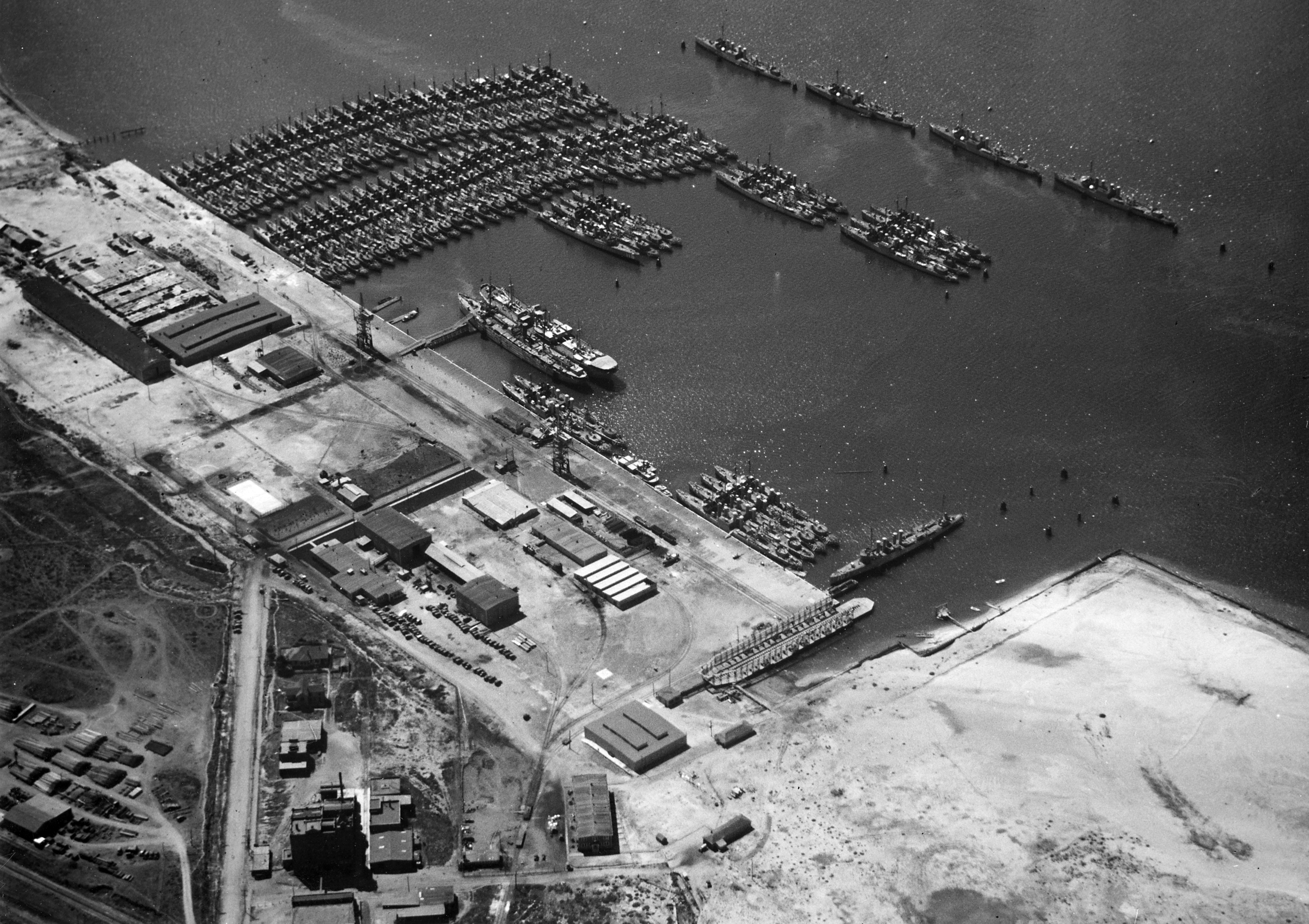
Seventy-seven "four-stackers" laid up at San Diego in 1924.

Only 64 of this class had been begun by Armistice Day, 11 November 1918, and none had yet been commissioned.

USS Graham collided with SS Panama off the New Jersey coast on 16 December 1921 and had to return to New York, where she was decommissioned on 31 March 1922, and was sold for scrapping on 19 September 1922.

Fourteen ships of the class were involved in the Honda Point Disaster (a.k.a. Point Pedernales) in September 1923, of which seven were lost in the worst peacetime loss in US Naval history.

Many never saw wartime service, as a significant number were decommissioned in 1930 and scrapped as part of the London Naval Treaty. About 40 Clemson-class destroyers with Yarrow boilers were scrapped or otherwise disposed of in 1930–31, as these boilers wore out quickly in service. Flush-deckers in reserve were commissioned as replacements. In 1936 only some 169 of the flush deck destroyers would be left, four Caldwell class and the rest Wickes and Clemson class. In 1937 four Clemson class were converted to destroyer minelayers (hull classification symbol DM), joining several Wickes-class ships in this role.

Nineteen were transferred to the Royal Navy in 1940 as part of the Destroyers for Bases Agreement, where they became part of the Town class. Others were upgraded or converted to high-speed transports (APD), high-speed minesweepers (DMS), destroyer minelayers (DM), or seaplane tenders (AVD) and served through World War II. Four Wickes-class DM conversions and the four Clemson-class DM conversions survived to serve in World War II.

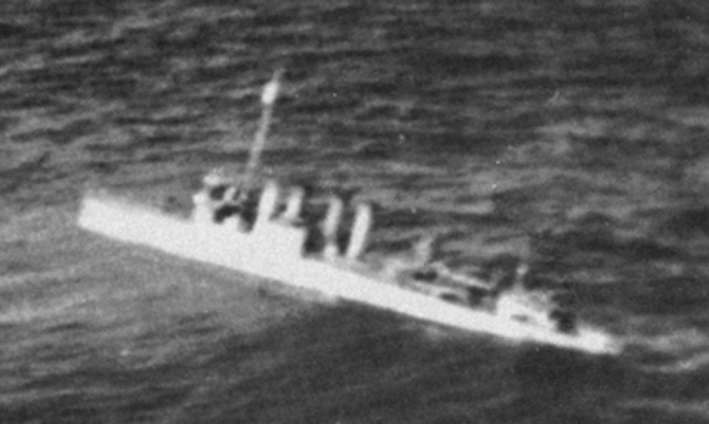
Clemson-class destroyer (possibly USS Pope) sinking, c. 1942

Most ships remaining in service during World War II were rearmed with dual-purpose 3-inch/50 caliber guns to provide better anti-aircraft protection. The AVD seaplane tender conversions received two guns; the APD high-speed transport, DM minelayer, and DMS minesweeper conversions received three guns, and those retaining destroyer classification received six. Their original low-angle 4-inch/50 caliber guns (Mark 9) were transferred to Defensively Equipped Merchant Ships for anti-submarine protection. For the ships converted to minesweepers, the twelve 21-inch torpedo tubes were replaced by minesweeping gear.

USS Stewart was scuttled at Soerabaja on 2 March 1942, following the surrender of the Dutch East Indies to the Japanese. She was raised, repaired and recommissioned as Japanese patrol boat PB-102 by the Imperial Japanese Navy. She was surrendered to the US Navy following the end of World War II and was used as a target for aircraft. In addition, 17 Clemson-class destroyers were lost during the war.

The wrecks of three Clemson-class destroyers remain in the San Francisco Bay area, USS Corry a few miles north of Mare Island Navy Yard on the Napa River, USS Thompson in the southern part of the Bay where it was used as a bombing target in World War II, and the aforementioned USS Stewart in what is now the Cordell Bank National Marine Sanctuary.

A number of ships in the class were christened by the initial batch of women who enlisted in the Navy as Yeoman (F) in World War I. USS Hatfield was sponsored by Mrs. J. Edmond Haugh (Helen Brooks) who had been a Yeoman during World War I.

== See also ==
- List of United States Navy losses in World War II
- List of ship classes of the Second World War
