= September 1923 =

Month of 1923

<<	September 1923					>>
Su	Mo	Tu	We	Th	Fr	Sa
						1
2	3	4	5	6	7	8
9	10	11	12	13	14	15
16	17	18	19	20	21	22
23	24	25	26	27	28	29
30

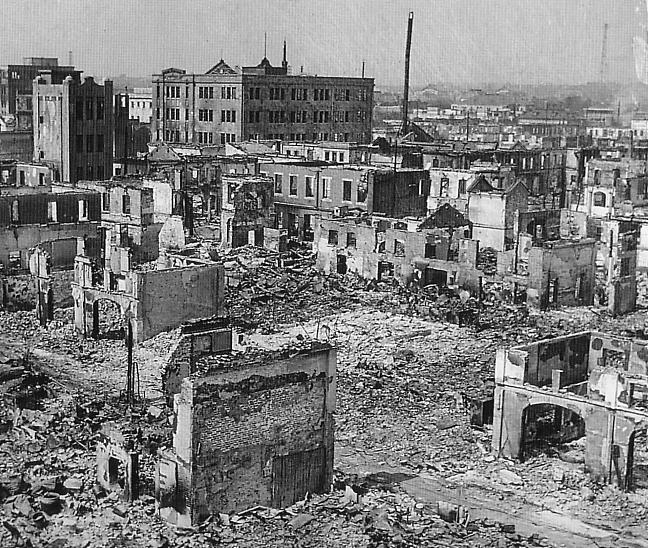
September 1, 1923: Earthquake kills over 100,000 people in Japan, leaves two million homeless

September 8, 1923: Seven U.S. Navy destroyers wrecked during exercises

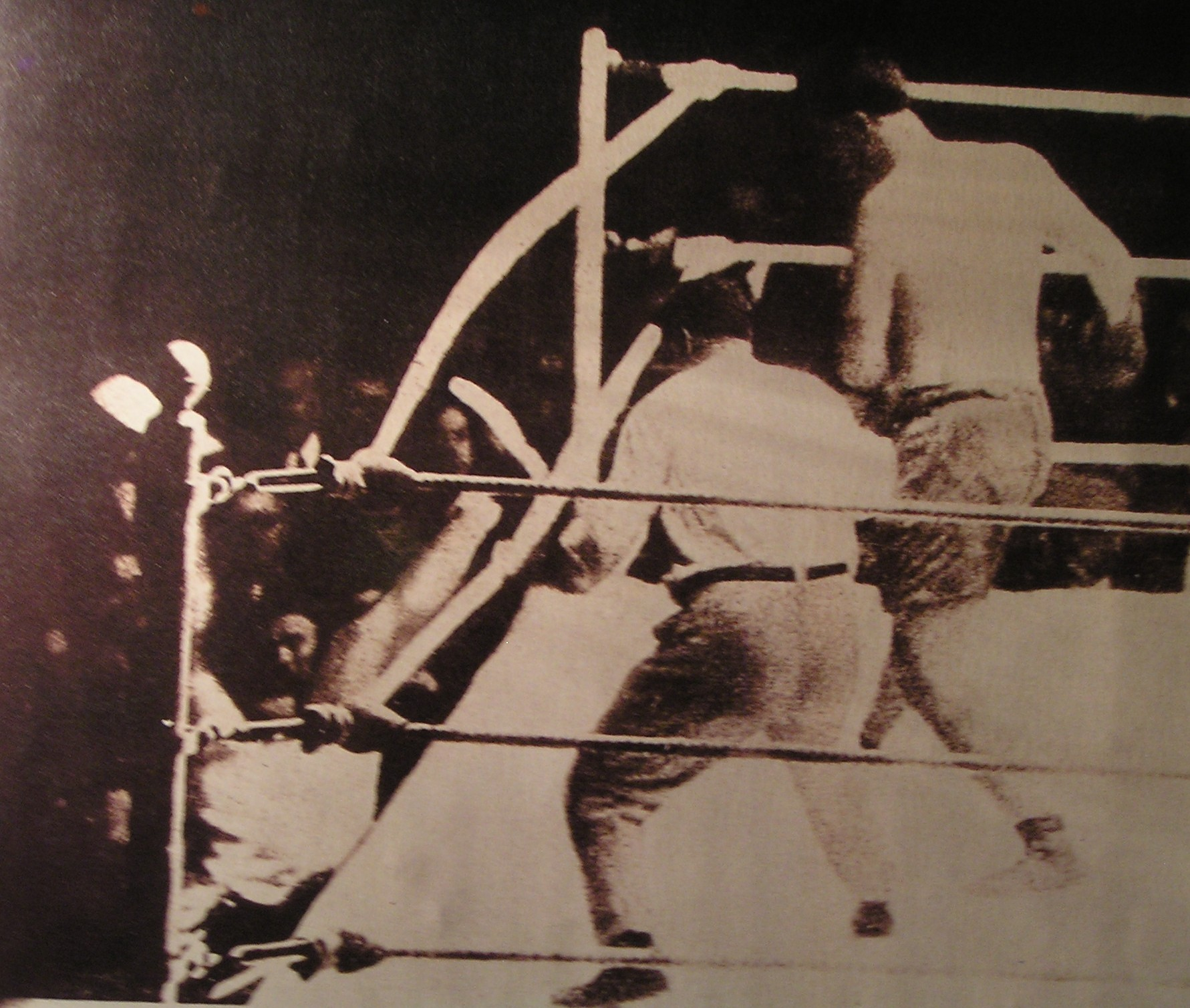
September 14, 1923: Champion Dempsey knocked out of the ring by challenger Firpo

The following events occurred in September 1923:

== September 1, 1923 (Saturday) ==
- A devastating earthquake with an approximate magnitude of 7.9 struck Japan at two minutes before noon. Over 120,000 people were killed and 2 million left homeless as half the city of Tokyo was destroyed. Among the dead were 112 people who were killed by a mudslide that swept the train that they were on down a 150 feet (46 m) embankment and into the ocean after it had stopped at the Nebukawa Station while traveling between Atami and Odawara.
- The Chosen Railway was established in Korea (at the time a part of Japan under the name "Chōsen") by the merger of six separate companies, and served as the largest privately owned corporation on the Korean Peninsula.
- The council of the League of Nations met at the request of Greece to discuss the Corfu crisis. The Italian government telegraphed the League that night saying that any decision made by the League regarding the Corfu incident would be ignored by Italy.
- An explosion killed 21 coal miners in Australia at the Bellbird Colliery in Bellbird, New South Wales.
- Born:
  - Rocky Marciano, American heavyweight boxer and world heavyweight champion from 1952 to 1956, known for retiring undefeated; as Rocco Marchegiano, in Brockton, Massachusetts (d. 1969)
  - McAllister Hull, American theoretical physicist who took part in the creation of the 1945 atomic bomb dropped on Nagasaki to force the surrender of Japan in World War II; in Birmingham, Alabama (d. 2011)
  - Kenneth Thomson, 2nd Baron Thomson of Fleet, Canadian businessman and collector; in North Bay, Ontario (d. 2006)
  - Karen Chandler, American pop music singer who had hits in the 1940s, 1950s, and 1960s; as Eva Nadauld, in Rexburg, Idaho (d. 2010)
- Died:
  - Matsuoka Yasukowa, 77, Japanese politician who served as Minister of Agriculture and as the first president of Nippon University, was killed in his house when it collapsed during the Great Kanto Earthquake. (b. 1846)
  - Josephine Blatt, 54, American circus performer known for her tremendous strength, and was best known by her stage name of "Minerva". (b. 1869)

== September 2, 1923 (Sunday) ==
- Admiral Yamamoto Gonnohyōe was installed as Prime Minister of Japan as part of an "emergency cabinet" installed the day after the earthquake, and to fill the vacancy left by the August 24 death of Katō Tomosaburō.
- The Kantō Massacre of non-Japanese ethnic minorities began in Japan in the aftermath of the earthquake the day before, starting with vigilante groups targeting Korean residents on the island of Honshu, at first with the encouragement of local police, and then with the participation of police and the Imperial Japanese Army. An estimated 6,000 people of Korean, Chinese or Ryukyuan descent were killed after rumors were spread that minorities were seeking to overthrow the Japanese government during the chaos following the earthquake.
- A "German Day" rally attended by over 100,000 nationalists was held in Nuremberg to commemorate the 53rd anniversary of victory over the French in the Battle of Sedan. Adolf Hitler and Erich Ludendorff were in attendance as Nazis were among the paraders.
- German Chancellor Gustav Stresemann suggested in a speech in Stuttgart that the passive resistance campaign in the Ruhr should be ended. "Every honest person in the Ruhr district and along the Rhine is longing for the hour when he will again return to work", Stresemann said. "This hour will have to come, and through German productive work the real solution of the conflict can be found. The purpose of passive resistance was to bring about this solution. We are ready to make the greatest material sacrifices, but we are not willing to give up the liberty of German soil."

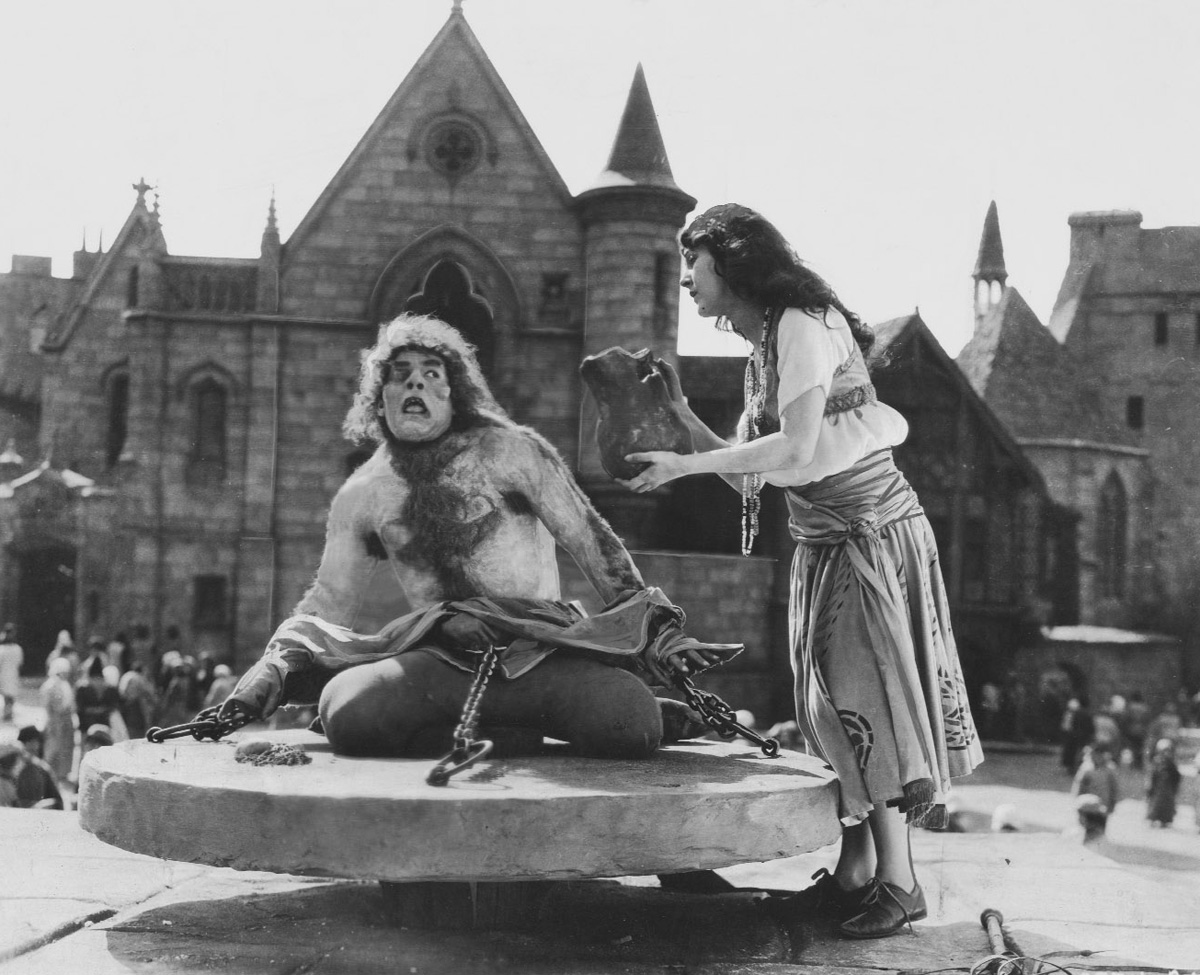
Chaney as Quasimodo

- Lon Chaney established his role as the "Man of 1,000 Faces" portraying Quasimodo in the debut of the popular silent film adaptation of The Hunchback of Notre Dame, released by Universal Pictures and making its debut at the Astor Theatre in New York before going into nationwide release on September 6.
- Died: J. Campbell Cantrill, 53, U.S. Congressman for Kentucky and Democratic nominee for Governor of Kentucky; died in the middle of his campaign for state office, died six days after having undergone surgery for a ruptured appendix. (b. 1870). William J. Fields, another incumbent U.S. Representative, was nominated by the Democratic Party's central committee to fill the vacancy left by Cantrill's death and would win the general election in November.

== September 3, 1923 (Monday) ==
- U.S. President Calvin Coolidge appealed to the American public for aid in the Japanese earthquake disaster.
- The film Rosita premiered at the Lyric Theatre in New York City.
- The Los Angeles Illustrated Daily News was first published after being founded by Cornelius Vanderbilt IV. The newspaper would cease publication on December 18, 1954.
- The musical Poppy made its debut on Broadway, premiering at the Apollo Theater for a run of 346 performances, and included in its cast comedian W. C. Fields as Professor Eustace McGargle.
- Born:
  - Glen Bell, American restaurant entrepreneur, founder of the Taco Bell fast food chain; in Lynwood, California (d. 2010)
  - Mort Walker, comic strip artist known for Beetle Bailey and Hi and Lois; as Addison Morton Walker, in El Dorado, Kansas (d. 2018)
  - Alan Bristow, British entrepreneur, founder of Bristow Helicopters Ltd, one of the world's largest helicopter service companies; in Balham, London (d. 2009)
  - Alice Gibson, Belizean librarian who established most of the libraries in Belize; in Belize City, British Honduras (now Belize) (d. 2021)

== September 4, 1923 (Tuesday) ==
- Benito Mussolini threatened to have Italy withdraw from the League of Nations if it insisted on arbitrating the Corfu crisis, saying the League was "absolutely not competent" to address the issue.
- The airship USS Shenandoah made its first flight.
- The musical revue London Calling!, produced by André Charlot with music by Noël Coward and Philip Braham, opened at London's Duke of York's Theatre. The musical was the first for Coward, and featured a 3-D stereoscopic shadowgraph as part of its opening act.
- Sad Sam Jones pitched a no-hitter for the New York Yankees against the Philadelphia Athletics by a final score of 2–0. It was the first no-hitter ever thrown by a visiting player in Shibe Park, and only the second in which none of the players had struck out.
- Born:
  - Warren M. Robbins, American art collector whose collection led to the formation of the National Museum of African Art at the Smithsonian Institution; in Worcester, Massachusetts (d. 2008)
  - Gloria Shayne Baker, American composer and songwriter, known for the melody of the 1962 Christmas carol "Do You Hear What I Hear?" (with lyrics by Noël Regney); as Gloria Shain, in Brookline, Massachusetts (d. 2008)
  - Mirko Ellis, Swiss-born Italian actor; as Mirko Korcinsky, in Locarno (d. 2014)
  - Ram Kishore Shukla, Indian politician and activist; in Beohari, British India (now in Madhya Pradesh statte) (d. 2003)
  - Mushtaq Ahmad Yusufi, Pakistani humorist and satire writer; in Tonk, Jaipur State, British India (now in Rajasthan state) (d. 2018)
- Died:
  - Howdy Wilcox, 34, American race car driver who won the 1919 Indianapolis 500, was killed in a crash at race at the Altoona Speedway in Altoona, Pennsylvania.(b. 1889)
  - Kawai Yoshitora, 21, Japanese Communist activist, was shot and killed in prison two days after his arrest on accusations of causing anarchy in the aftermath of the September 1 earthquake. (b. 1902)
  - Paul Friedländer, 66, German chemist known for the Friedländer synthesis process of extracting dyes (b. 1857)

== September 5, 1923 (Wednesday) ==
- Nearly all the coal mines in the Ruhr were active as the passive resistance campaign in the region wound down.
- The musical stage comedy The Beauty Prize, with music by Jerome Kern, book and lyrics by George Grossmith and P. G. Wodehouse, opened at the Winter Garden Theatre in London.
- Born: Gustavo Rojo, Mexican actor, was born on board the German cruise ship Krefeld as it was transporting his family across the Atlantic Ocean to Montevideo, Uruguay (d. 2017)
- Died: John "Dots" Miller, 36, American professional baseball player, died from tuberculosis. (b. 1886)

== September 6, 1923 (Thursday) ==
- The League of Nations handed the Corfu crisis to the Conference of Ambassadors to mediate. Mussolini said that Italy would abide by the Conference's decision.
- The comedy film Potash and Perlmutter was released.

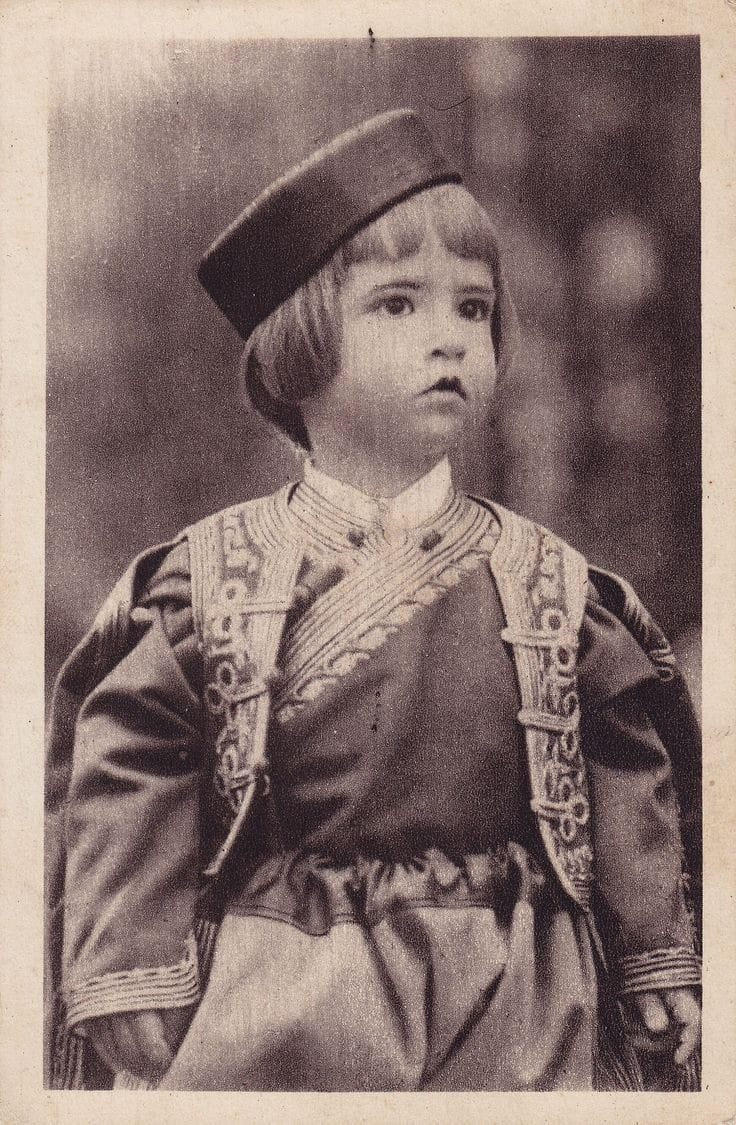
Peter II of Yugoslavia as a young boy

- Born: Petar II Karadordević, the last King of Yugoslavia from 1934 to 1945; in Belgrade, Kingdom of Yugoslavia (present-day Serbia) (d. 1970)
- Died: Pedro José Escalón, 76, President of El Salvador from 1903 to 1907 (b. 1847)

== September 7, 1923 (Friday) ==
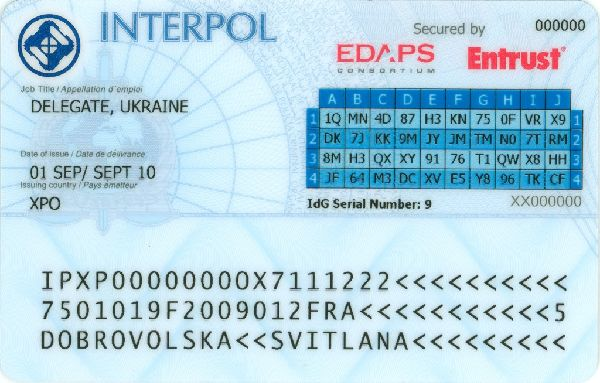
An Interpol ID card

- Interpol was founded as the International Criminal Police Commission at a conference of police officials from 16 nations meeting in Austria at Vienna. It would adopt its present name in 1956. A century later, the Interpol network would be present in all but a few of the world's nations.
- Mary Katherine Campbell retained her title in the 3rd Miss America pageant. She is the only Miss America to ever win twice, as previous winners were only eligible to be re-crowned during the earliest years of the pageant.
- Howard Ehmke of the Boston Red Sox pitched a no-hitter against the Philadelphia Athletics, 4–0 at Shibe Park. It was the second time the Athletics were no-hit in the space of four days.
- Born:
  - Madeleine Dring, English composer and actress; at Harringay, London (d. 1977)
  - Byron Seaman, Canadian oil company magnate and co-owner of the Calgary Flames NHL team franchise; in Rouleau, Saskatchewan (d. 2021)
- Died:
  - James V. Ganly, 44, U.S. Congressman representing the 24th New York district; died from injuries sustained the night after he crashed his car into a tree. (b. 1878)
  - Charles Newton Little, 65, American mathematician and expert in knot theory, died from heart failure. (b. 1858)

== September 8, 1923 (Saturday) ==
- Seven U.S. Navy destroyers were accidentally sunk and 23 sailors were killed in the Honda Point Disaster off the coast of California in the largest peacetime loss of ships in U.S. history, after Captain Edward H. Watson ordered a squadron of 14 ships to make a fast passage to San Diego despite a heavy fog. Sailing in close formation, the column of ships began piling up as one after another ran aground. The ships USS Delphy, USS S. P. Lee, USS Young, USS Woodbury, USS Nicholas, USS Fuller and USS Chauncey, all sustained irreparable damage. The cost to the U.S. of losing the destroyers was estimated to be $10.5 million, equivalent to $182 million a century later.
- The Conference of Ambassadors announced the terms upon which the Corfu dispute between Italy and Greece would be settled. The terms were highly favorable to Italy but both sides approved the settlement.
- A parade of housewives marched through Berlin carrying empty baskets in protest of their inability to buy food due to hyperinflation.
- Born: Melitta Marxer, Liechtenstein women's rights activist who lobbied for decades for women to get the right to vote in elections in the European principality of Liechtenstein before suffrage was finally extended in 1984; as Melitta Kaiser, in Schaanwald (d. 2015)
- Died: Ugo Sivocci, 38, Italian auto racer and cyclist, was killed during a test drive of the new Alfa Romeo P1 automobile. (b. 1885)

== September 9, 1923 (Sunday) ==
- Apostolos Alexandris, the Foreign Minister of Greece, informed the Council of Ambassadors that he would accept the decision of their arbitration commission to resolve the Corfu incident.
- Carlo Salamano of Italy won the Italian Grand Prix.
- Born:
  - Cliff Robertson, American actor and Academy Award winner; in San Diego (d. 2011)
  - Daniel Carleton Gajdusek, American virologist and recipient of the 1976 Nobel Prize in Physiology or Medicine, later a convicted child molester; in Yonkers, New York (d. 2008)
  - Max Lüscher, Swiss psychotherapist and developer of the Lüscher color test; in Basel (d. 2017)
  - Rosita Sokou, Greek journalist; in Plaka, Athens (present-day Greece) (d. 2021)
- Died: Hermes Rodrigues da Fonseca, 68, Brazilian field marshal and President of Brazil from 1910 to 1914 (b. 1855)

== September 10, 1923 (Monday) ==
- The Irish Free State was admitted to the League of Nations.
- A total eclipse of the Sun occurred that was visible over much of the southwestern United States and Mexico, with residents of Los Angeles, San Diego and Mexico City being in the path of the largest part of the eclipse. Unfortunately for California viewers, a thick high fog and cloud cover blocked their view of the Sun and the Moon.
- French physicist Louis de Broglie presented his hypothesis on subatomic particles as waves before the Paris Academy of Sciences in his paper Ondes et quanta.
- Born: Glen P. Robinson, American businessman and physicist who co-founded Scientific Atlanta; in Crescent City, Florida (d. 2013)
- Died: Sukumar Ray, 35, Bengali children's writer and poet; died of a leishmaniasis infection (b. 1887)

== September 11, 1923 (Tuesday) ==
- German military police shot six dead in a riot by unemployed people in front of Dresden City Hall.
- Died:
  - General Zhang Xun, 68, Chinese military officer and royalist who attempted to restore Emperor Xuantong to power with himself as Prime Minister before his coup failed after 11 days in July 1917 (b. 1854)
  - Sigmund Lubin, 72, Polish-born American motion picture producer whose Lubin Manufacturing Company created more than 1,000 films (b. 1851)
  - Raymond B. West, 37, American motion picture director who directed more than 70 silent films (b. 1886)
  - Jean Marie Marcelin Gilibert, 84, French law enforcement officer who organized the National Police of Colombia and was its first Commissioner (b. 1839)

== September 12, 1923 (Wednesday) ==
- Southern Rhodesia became a British colony when the Crown took it over from the British South Africa Company following a 1922 referendum.
- Finnair, the flag carrier airline of Finland, was incorporated by Bruno Lucander as "Aero O/Y" (Aero Osakeyhtiö, literally "Aero Share Company" or "Aero Corporation") and would begin flights on March 20, 1924.
- The Convention for the Suppression of the Circulation of and Traffic in Obscene Publications was signed in Geneva by representatives of 34 members of the League of Nations, and took effect on August 7, 1924.
- The melodrama film The Daring Years, starring Mildred Harris, Charles Emmett Mack and Clara Bow, was released.
- Police in Bulgaria began arrests of over 2,500 communists that the government suspected of plotting an uprising.
- The town of Atherton, California was formally incorporated after approval by the landowners of the unincorporated community of Fair Oaks, and was named for the late entrepreneur Faxon Atherton.
- Born:
  - David Westbury, British forensic psychiatrist; in Rugby, Warwickshire (d. 1983)
  - Larry Brink, American professional football player; in Milaca, Minnesota (d. 2016)

== September 13, 1923 (Thursday) ==
- A military coup orchestrated by General Miguel Primo de Rivera seized control of Spain.
- A localized uprising around Gorna Dzhumaya in Bulgaria was quickly put down by the Internal Macedonian Revolutionary Organization.

== September 14, 1923 (Friday) ==
- The Dempsey vs. Firpo boxing match took place before a crowd of 80,000 people at the Polo Grounds in New York City, with world heavyweight champion Jack Dempsey being challenged by Luis Ángel Firpo of Argentina. In the first three-minute round, Firpo knocked Dempsey to one knee; Dempsey knocked Firpo down seven times; and Firpo caused Dempsey to tumble backwards out of the ring. In the second round, Dempsey knocked Firpo out at the 57-second mark to retain the World Heavyweight Championship.
- All five people aboard a Daimler Airway flight from London to Manchester were killed when the de Havilland DH.34 stalled and plummeted to the ground at Ivinghoe, Buckinghamshire.
- Boston Red Sox first baseman George Burns turned an unassisted triple play against the Cleveland Indians.
- Born: Amal Kumar Raychaudhuri, Indian physicist known for the Raychaudhuri equation; in Barisal, Bengal Province, British India (present-day Bangladesh) (d. 2005)
- Died:
  - Sayed Darwish, 31, Egyptian singer and composer (b. 1892)
  - Edward Millen, 62, Australian journalist and politician who, served as the first Minister for Repatriation (later the Minister for Veterans' Affairs), and Minister for Defence;,died from chronic nephritis (b. 1860)

== September 15, 1923 (Saturday) ==
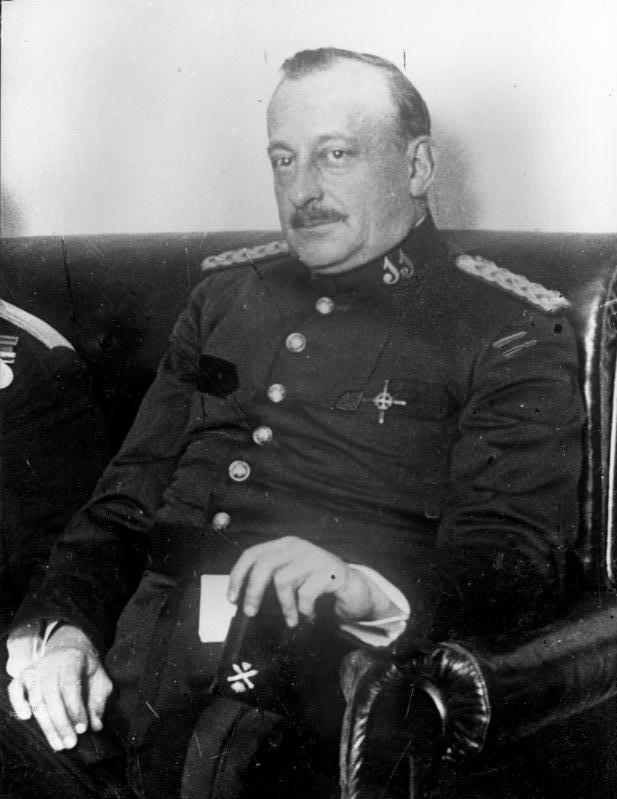
Spain's Premier Primo de Rivera

- Miguel Primo de Rivera was sworn in as Prime Minister of Spain and appointed his new cabinet. At de Rivera's behest, King Alfonso XIII suspended the Spanish Constitution and imposed martial law.

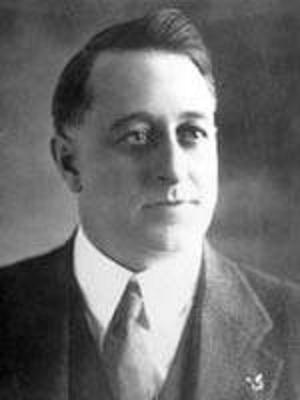
Oklahoma's Governor Walton

- Oklahoma Governor Jack C. Walton declared "absolute martial law" statewide in his fight against the Ku Klux Klan. The official proclamation said that anyone who aided or abetted the Klan would be "deemed to be enemies of the sovereign state of Oklahoma and shall be dealt with by the military forces of the state." Governor Walton announced further that he was suspending the writ of habeas corpus in Tulsa County.
- Twelve people were killed and many injured in food riots in the German Silesian town of Sorau.
- In Britain, French socialite Marguerite Alibert was acquitted in her murder trial. On July 10, she had shot and killed her husband, Ali Kamel Fahmy Bey, at the Savoy Hotel in London.
- The costume adventure film Scaramouche premiered at the Shubert-Belasco Theater in Washington, D.C.
- Born: Mikhail Tanich, popular Russian songwriter and founder of the group Lesopoval; as Mikhail Tankhilevich, in Taganrog, Russian SFSR, Soviet Union (d. 2008)

== September 16, 1923 (Sunday) ==
- The Amakasu Incident occurred in Japan when two anarchists, Sakae Ōsugi and Noe Itō, were beaten to death, along with Sakae's 6-year-old nephew Munekazu Tachibana, by a detachment of the Japanese military police, the Kenpeitai, under the command of Masahiko Amakasu. The bodies of the man, woman and boy were then thrown into a well.
- The popular Australian comic strip Fatty Finn, created by Syd Nicholls, made its first appearance, debuting in Sydney's Sunday News.
- The romantic drama Zaza, starring Gloria Swanson and H. B. Warner was released.
- The Harold Lloyd comedy film Why Worry? was released.
- Born:
  - Lee Kuan Yew, the first Prime Minister of Singapore from 1965 to 1990; in Singapore (d. 2015)
  - Ki. Rajanarayanan, Indian Tamil language writer and folklorist popularly known as Ki.Ra.; in Idaiseval, Madras Province, British India (now the Tamil Nadu state (d. 2021)
- Died: Sir Walter Davidson, 64, British colonial administrator and diplomat, who served as Governor of New South Wales from 1918 until his death, and had served as the colonial governor of the Seychelles from 1903 to 1912 and the Dominion of Newfoundland from 1913 to 1917, died from cardiovascular disease (b. 1859)

== September 17, 1923 (Monday) ==
- Lamar University, located in Beaumont, Texas, began classes as South Park Junior College, so-called because of its location on the third floor of the South Park High School. In 1932, it would be renamed Lamar College in honor of Mirabeau B. Lamar, the second president (after Sam Houston) of the Republic of Texas.

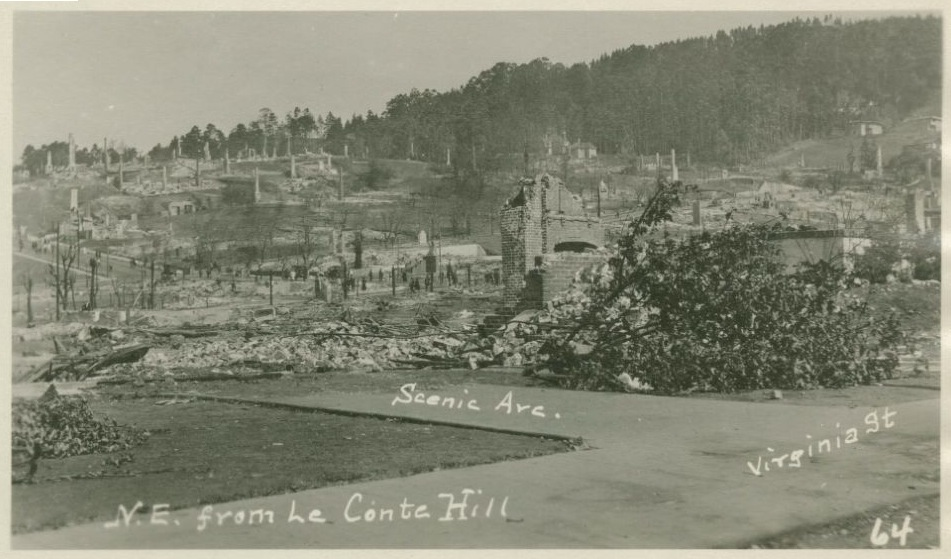
Berkeley homes after the fire

- A fast moving wildfire destroyed 584 houses and 56 other buildings in Berkeley, California, north of the University of California campus.
- Former Prime Minister Abdel Khalek Sarwat Pasha returned to Egypt after having spent nearly 15 months in exile in the Seychelles and then five more months in France.
- The Sutton Vane play Outward Bound premiered at the Everyman Theatre in Hampstead, London.
- Club Deportivo Luis Ángel Firpo, commonly called "L.A. Firpo" and winner of 10 championships in La Primera, El Salvador's top-level soccer league, was founded in the city of Usulután. Originally called Club Deportivo Tecún Umán, it was renamed four days later for Argentine boxer Luis Ángel Firpo, who had recently fought world champion Jack Dempsey.
- Born:
  - Hank Williams, influential American country music singer who was inducted into both the Country Music Hall of Fame in 1961 and the Rock and Roll Hall of Fame in 1987; as Hiram King Williams, in Butler County, Alabama (d. 1953)
  - Leon Merian, Armenian-American jazz trumpeter; as Leon Megerdichian, in Braintree, Massachusetts (d. 2007)
  - Lieutenant General Liu Yudi, Chinese jet pilot flying ace for the People's Liberation Army Air Force of Communist China during the Korean War; in Cangxian, Hebei province (d. 2015)
- Died: William Henry Merrill, 54, American electrical engineer who founded Underwriters Laboratories to test, and certify as safe, industrial and consumer electrical appliances (b. 1868)

== September 18, 1923 (Tuesday) ==
- Foreign Minister Balingiin Tserendorj became the new Prime Minister of Mongolia after the death of Sodnomyn Damdinbazar.
- The first holotype specimen of the prehistoric bird Andrewsornis abottii was discovered. Paleontologist John Bernard Abbott of the U.S. found the fossilized remains (an incomplete skull, the lower jaws, part of the shoulder bone and parts of a toe) while on an expedition in Argentina's Chubut Province. The species had become extinct more than 21 million years earlier.
- The newspapers of New York City were paralyzed by a pressman's strike.
- Two Canadian mountaineers, Neal Carter and Charles T. Townsend, became the first persons to climb to the top of the 8,428 feet (2,569 m) high Diavolo Peak.

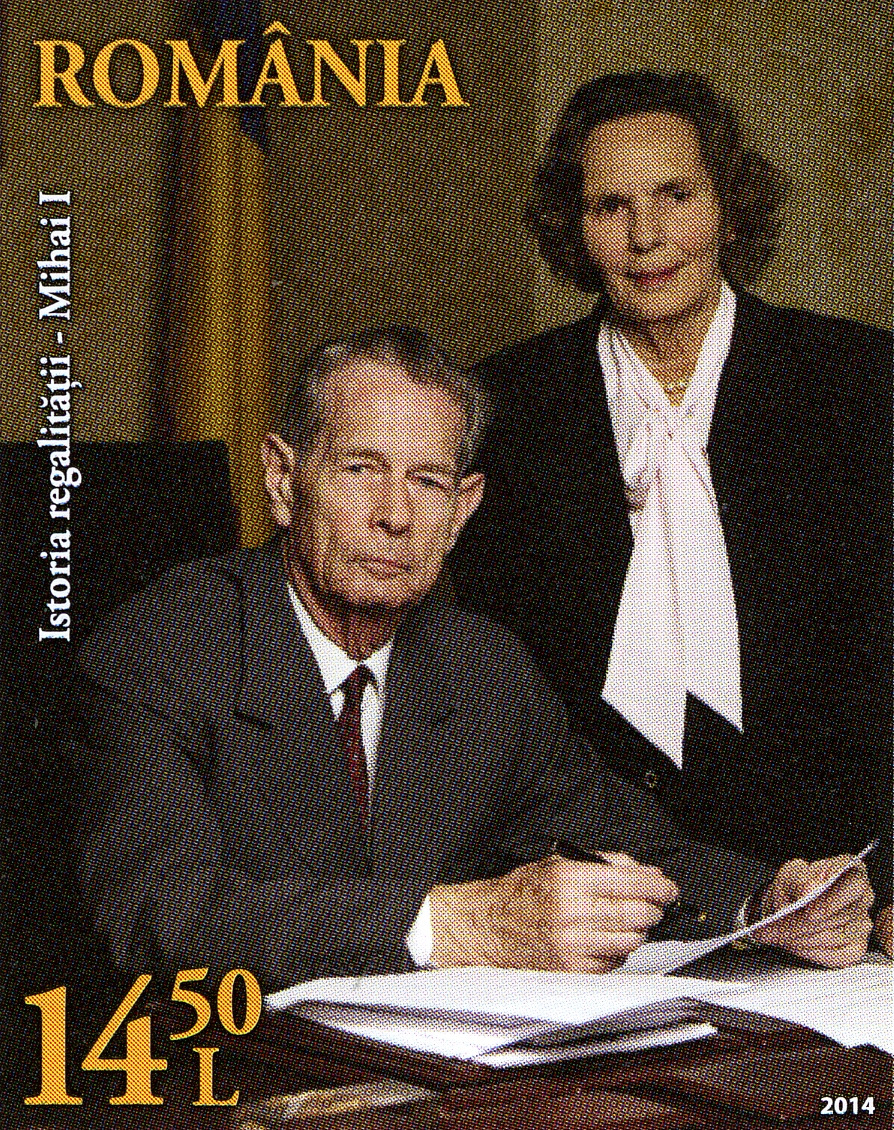
A 2014 stamp honoring King Michael and Queen Anne

- Born:
  - Bertha Wilson, Scottish-born Canadian lawyer who became the first woman to serve as a justice on the Supreme Court of Canada in 1982; as Bertha Wernham, in Kirkcaldy, Scotland (d. 2007)
  - Queen Anne of Romania, French-born wife of the former King Michael I of Romania, having married him after his abdication; as Princess Anne of Bourbon-Parma, in Paris (d. 2016)
  - Al Quie, American politician and farmer who served in the U.S. House of Representatives and as the Governor of Minnesota; in Wheeling Township, Minnesota (d. 2023)
  - "Lead Pipe Joe" Todaro, American Mafia boss of the Buffalo crime family in Buffalo, New York from 1984 to 2006 (d. 2012)

== September 19, 1923 (Wednesday) ==
- The Ernst Toller play The German Hinkemann premiered in Leipzig, about the hardships of a soldier who returns from the war disabled. German nationalists disrupted the premiere of the play and the cast received death threats.
- The Irish Free State's fourth parliament, the Oireachtas, was opened by Governor-General Tim Healy 23 days after elections for the Dáil Éireann had been held.
- Died: Kairakutei Black the First (Shodai Kairakutei Burakku, stage name for Henry James Black), 64, Australian-born actor and the first non-Japanese kabuki actor and rakugoka storyteller.

== September 20, 1923 (Thursday) ==
- A communist-led revolt broke out in Bulgaria against the government of Premier Aleksandar Tsankov.
- The New York Yankees clinched their third straight American League pennant when they defeated the St. Louis Browns 4–3.
- The 1920 Copa de Honor Cousenier was played after a delay of three years as the 15th, and final annual soccer football game between the winners of the Copas de Honor of Argentina and of Uruguay. Boca Juniors of Buenos Aires defeated Universal of Montevideo, 2 to 0.
- Born:
  - Geraldine Clinton Little, Irish-born American poet; in Northern Ireland (d. 1997)
  - Stefan Bozhkov, Bulgarian footballer with 53 games for the national team, later the Bulgarian National Team coach from 1966 to 1970; in Sofia (d. 2014)
  - Ricardo Montez (stage name for Levy Isaac Attias), English TV actor; in Gibraltar (d. 2010)
  - Jimmy Perry, English writer, best known for his work on Dad's Army, It Ain't Half Hot Mum and Hi-de-Hi!; in Barnes, Surrey (d. 2016)
  - Jørgen Rydder, leader of the Danish resistance against the Nazis during World War II; in Aars (executed 1944)
- Died: Young Sen-yat, 31, Hawaiian-born Chinese aviator and entrepreneur, first director of the Chinese Aviation Bureau, dubbed by President Sun Yat-sen as "The Father of Chinese Aviation", was killed in a torpedo explosion.

== September 21, 1923 (Friday) ==
- The pressman's strike in New York City ended.
- Died: Dr. Fidel Pagés, 37, Spanish military surgeon who developed the technique of epidural anesthesia, was killed in a traffic accident in the town of Quintanapalla while returning to Madrid after a vacation with his family in Cestona.

== September 22, 1923 (Saturday) ==
- Police cells in Chicago were filled to capacity after 600 arrests were made in a citywide raid on speakeasies.
- Born:
  - Dannie Abse, Welsh poet; in Cardiff (d. 2014)
  - A. I. Akram, Pakistani Army officer and military historian; in Ludhiana, Punjab Province, British India (now part of Punjab state of India) (d. 1989)
- Died: Hermann Kiese, 58, German rose cultivator known for creating multiple hybrids, including the Veilchenbdlau blue violet rose

== September 23, 1923 (Sunday) ==
- Lightning strikes killed five competitors in the annual Gordon Bennett Cup balloon race, and injured six others. The dead were U.S. Army lieutenants John W. Choptaw and Robert S. Olmsted, whose S-6 balloon crashed in the Netherlands near Loosbroek; two people on the Swiss balloon Génève which burned after being hit by lightning; and a person on the Spanish balloon Polar.
- King Boris III of Bulgaria dissolved parliament, which had not met since the overthrow of Aleksandar Stamboliyski, and declared a state of emergency.
- The Call of the Wild, the first film adaptation of Jack London's 1903 novel of the same name, premiered in the U.S.
- Born:
  - Socorro Ramos, Philippine entrepreneur and co-founder (in 1942) of the National Book Store chain; in Santa Cruz, Laguna (alive in 2026)
  - Kim Williams (stage name for Elizabeth Kandiko), American writer and public radio commentator; in Gallatin, New York (d. 1986)
- Died:
  - Carl L. Boeckmann, 56, Norwegian-American artist
  - John Morley, 1st Viscount Morley of Blackburn, 84, British statesman and writer, Secretary of State for India 1905–1910, Lord President of the Council 1910–1914

== September 24, 1923 (Monday) ==
- Governor Walton of Oklahoma directed all citizen soldiers of the state to be prepared "with such arms as they possess or can obtain to come to the assistance of the sovereign state of Oklahoma when ordered to do so by the governor."
- Murray State University began classes in the U.S. state of Kentucky as Murray State Normal School, with 202 students in at a former high school building until its permanent campus could be opened. Nearly 100 years later, it would have an enrollment of more than 9,000 students.
- The U.S. Bureau of Fisheries vessel USFS Curlew rescued 58 of the 75 passengers and crew from the Canadian ferryboat Waubic.
- Born: Ladislav Fuks, Czech novelist; in Prague, Czechoslovakia (present-day Czech Republic) (d. 1994)
- Died: William Henry Ellis, 59, African-American entrepreneur and millionaire who had attempted to create a colony for African-Americans in Mexico's Tlahualilo Municipality (b. 1864)

== September 25, 1923 (Tuesday) ==
- The German government, led by Friedrich Ebert, officially ended its campaign of passive resistance against occupying forces. In response, extremist groups, upset over Germany "losing another war", met to discuss overthrow of the government. Nazi Party leader Adolf Hitler met in Munich with the top right-wing leaders who would form the Kampfbund and persuaded them to entrust him as their leader. Ernst Röhm would write later that Hermann Kriebel, Hitler, Hermann Göring of the Sturmabteilung, Adolf Heiss and Joseph Seydel of the Bund Reichskriegsflagge, and Friedrich Weber of the Bund Oberland, conferred on the situation and that "In a magnificent speech lasting two hours and a half, Hitler unraveled a gripping picture of the political situation, and at its conclusion requested us to entrust the full political leadership to him. Tears in his eyes... Heiss extended him his hand and acceded to his request, and Weber followed his example. I was also highly emotional, for I was seeing the concept take shape for which I had yearned for so long. Now I believed that the hour of our liberation was nearer..."
- The first scheduled passenger airline service by flying boat commenced as British Marine Air Navigation Company began flights with three Supermarine Super Eagle aircraft on flights between Southampton in Britain, and Guernsey, one of the Channel Islands.
- Born: John J. Graham, American graphic designer known for being the designer of the NBC logo, in New York City (d. 1994)

== September 26, 1923 (Wednesday) ==
- German Chancellor Gustav Stresemann suspended seven articles of the Weimar Constitution and declared a state of emergency.
- Bavarian Prime Minister Eugen von Knilling appointed Gustav von Kahr State Commissioner and granted him dictatorial powers.
- Bulgarian troops went on the offensive against the rebels, attacking Ferdinand and Boychinovtsi.
- The Council of Ambassadors awarded Italy an indemnity of 50 million lire against Greece over the Corfu incident, over British protests.
- German intelligence agent Lothar Witzke, who had been arrested in 1918 in the United States, was pardoned of his espionage conviction by U.S. President Calvin Coolidge, and deported to Berlin.
- The San Francisco Opera made its debut, presenting its first program, La bohème, at the city's Civic Auditorium.
- The dramatic film A Woman of Paris, directed by Charlie Chaplin and starring Edna Purviance, premiered at the Criterion Theatre in Hollywood.
- Born:
  - Dev Anand, Indian film actor, director and producer; as Dharamdev Pishorimal Anand, in Shakargarh Tehsil, Punjab Province, British India (present-day Pakistan) (d. 2011)
  - Paul J. Kaesberg, German-born American biochemist and virologist; in Engers (d. 2010)
- Died: Aubrey Herbert, 43, British diplomat and champion of Albanian independence, died from blood poisoning from a dental extraction (b. 1880) On two occasions, Herbert had been offered the throne of Albania during a search for a neutral monarch.

== September 27, 1923 (Thursday) ==
- Italian forces withdrew from Corfu in compliance with the Council of Ambassadors agreement.
- Bulgarian troops captured Ferdinand from the rebels, effectively ending the September Uprising.
- The first round of voting in Egypt's first parliamentary elections took place as voters selected an electoral college of about 38,000 delegates. The delegates then cast the votes for the 215 seats in the Chamber of Deputies on January 12.

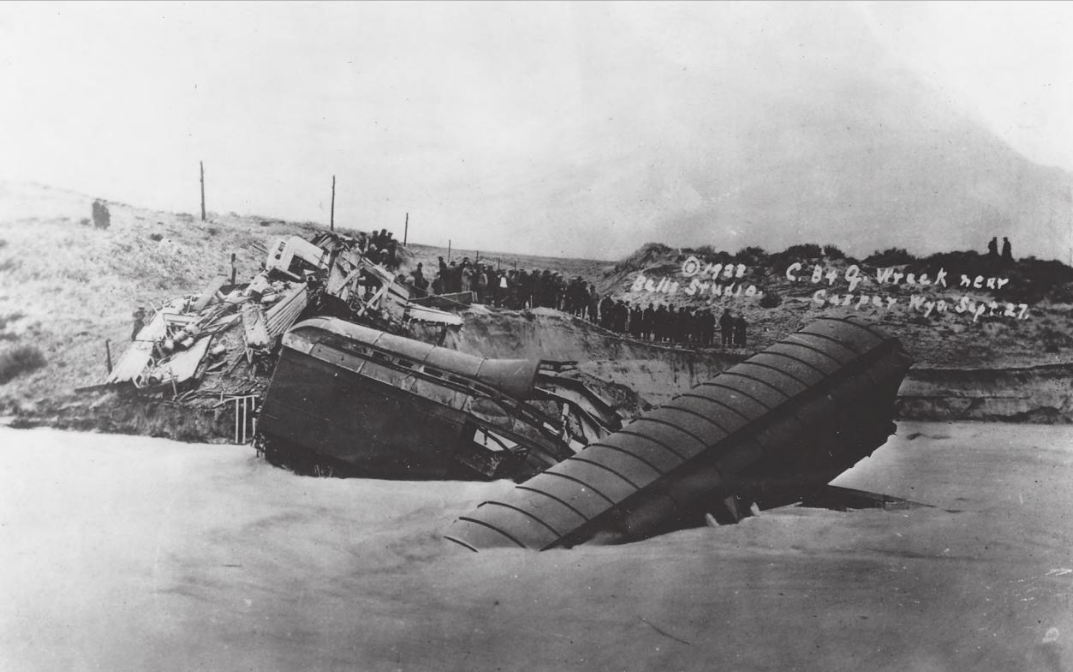
The CB&Q Wreck

- A train wreck killed 30 people in the U.S. state of Wyoming after a bridge was washed away by flooding of the North Platte River. The Chicago, Burlington and Quincy Railroad train was making an overnight trip from Casper, Wyoming toward Denver, Colorado, and was only 15 miles (24 km) out of Casper when it plunged into Cole Creek near what is now the community of Meadow Acres in the worst rail accident in Wyoming history.
- German Army Major Bruno Buchrucker sent out an order directing 4,500 men of the paramilitary group Black Reichswehr to assemble on September 30 to carry out a coup against the German government.
- The Oklahoma Supreme Court allowed a referendum to go ahead on October 2 in which voters would decide if the state legislature could convene without being called by the governor. If voters approved the measure then impeachment proceedings were sure to go ahead against Governor Jack C. Walton, who was therefore fighting to block the referendum.
- The Soviet Union deported anarchists Senya Fleshin and Molly Steimer, placing both of them on a ship bound for Germany after they had gone on a hunger strike while in a Soviet prison. Molly Steimer had been deported from the United States on November 24, 1921, after having served prison sentences in the U.S. for anarchist activities.
- Born: Violetta Farjeon, English stage actress and singer; in Kensington, London (d. 2015)

== September 28, 1923 (Friday) ==
- Abyssinia was admitted to the League of Nations, by unanimous vote of the League's General Assembly.
- Violent windstorms and flooding struck Louisville, Nebraska and Council Bluffs, Iowa, killing 14 people.
- The New York Giants beat the Brooklyn Robins 3–0 to clinch the National League pennant and would meet the New York Yankees in the World Series for the third straight year.
- The British magazine Radio Times began publication.
- Born:
  - Giuseppe Casale, Italian Roman Catholic bishop; in Trani, Province of Bari (d. 2023)
  - Robert Guestier Goelet, French-born American philanthropist and president of the American Museum of Natural History; in Amblainville, Oise département (d. 2019)
  - Roedad Khan, Pakistani government minister for six different prime ministers between from 1958 and 1993, including as Pakistan's Interior Secretary from 1978 to 1988; in Mardan, North-West Frontier Province, British India (present-day Pakistan) (d. 2024)
  - Tuli Kupferberg, American singer, poet, and writer; as Naphtali Kupferberg, in New York City (d. 2010)
  - John Scott, 9th Duke of Buccleuch, Scottish captain and politician, Lord Lieutenant of Selkirkshire; as Walter Francis John Montagu Douglas Scott (d. 2007)
  - William Windom, American actor; in New York City (d. 2012)

== September 29, 1923 (Saturday) ==
- The British Mandate for Palestine went into effect for what would become the nation of Israel.
- The French Mandate for Syria and the Lebanon went into effect by France's agreement with the League of Nations.
- Italy's Prime Minister Benito Mussolini ordered the return of 10 million of the 50 million lire that Greece had paid over the Corfu incident and directed it to be spent on needy Greek and Armenian refugees.
- Bavarian State Commissioner Gustav von Kahr defied the federal government and refused to obey an order directing the suppression of publications by Adolf Hitler.
- The first U.S. Track & Field championships for women were held, at Weequahic Park in Newark, New Jersey, with 11 events, with four running events, two for jumping, and five for throwing various items, including basketballs and softballs.
- Born:
  - Roland Gööck, German editor and non-fiction author; in Felchta, Free State of Thuringia (d. 1991)
  - Jenny Berthelius, Swedish writer of crime novels and children's books; in Stockholm, Sweden (d. 2019)

== September 30, 1923 (Sunday) ==
- The Küstrin Putsch was carried out by militants of the Black Reichswehr, led by Bruno Ernst Buchrucker, in an attempt to start a coup against the government by seizing three forts around the city of Küstrin, east of Berlin.
- A riot broke out in Düsseldorf in Germany after a mob rushed a crowd gathered outdoors to hear a speech by separatist leader Josef Friedrich Matthes. 16 were killed in the fighting.
- The French airship Dixmude completed a record nonstop flight of 118 hours and 41 minutes from Cuers across the Mediterranean into the Sahara and back towards Paris and then back to Cuers again.
- The fifth and final film of stage magician Harry Houdini, Haldane of the Secret Service, was released by his own Houdini Picture Corporation. The 84-minute silent adventure film, starring Houdini as "Heath Haldane", was produced by the Houdini Picture Corporation and marked his last venture as a director and an actor.
- Born:
  - Donald Swann, Welsh composer who was part of the writing team of Flanders and Swann; in Llanelli (d. 1994)
  - Giuseppe Campora, Italian operatic tenor; in Tortona (d. 2004)
  - Thérèse Gouin Décarie, Canadian Quebecois developmental psychologist; in Montreal (d. 2024)
