= Kiese =

Kiese is a surname. Notable people with the surname include:

- Carlos Kiese (born 1957), Paraguayan footballer and manager
- Hermann Kiese (1865–1923), German rosarian
- Hugo Enrique Kiese (born 1954), Paraguay footballer
- Isaac Kiese Thelin (born 1992), Swedish footballer
- Rivaldo González Kiese (born 1987), Paraguayan football player

Kiese is a given name. Notable people with the given name include:

- Kiese Laymon (born 1974), American writer, editor and professor of English and Creative Writing
