= Yugawara Station =

Railway station in Yugawara, Kanagawa Prefecture, Japan

JT20 Yugawara Station 湯河原駅
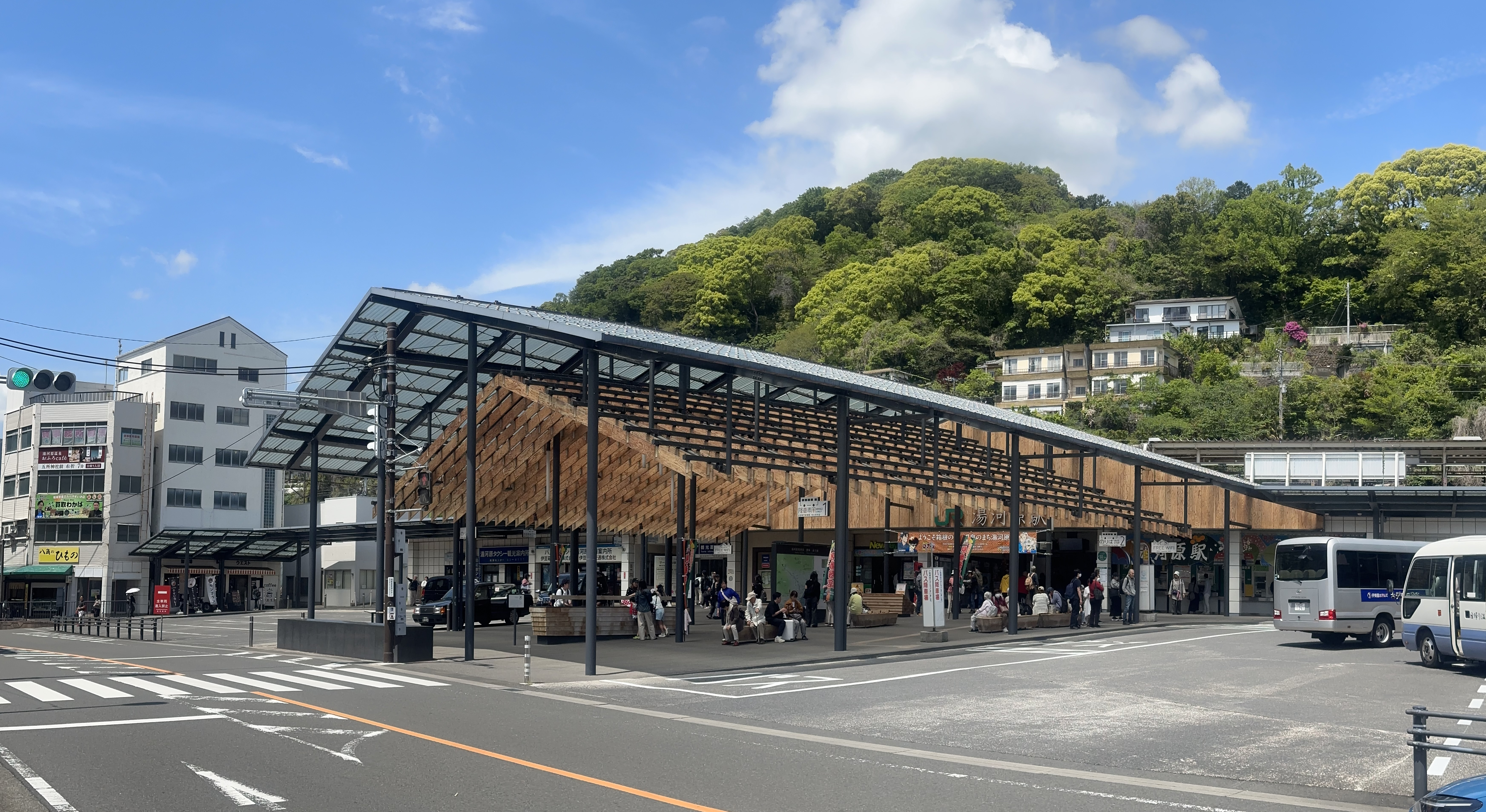
- Yugawara Station in 2026

General information
- Location: Miyashita, Yugawara Town, Ashigarashimo District; Kanagawa Prefecture 259-0304; Japan
- Coordinates: 35°08′45″N 139°06′08″E
- Operator: JR East
- Line: Tōkaidō Line
- Distance: 99.1 km (61.6 mi) from Tokyo
- Platforms: 1 island platform
- Tracks: 2
- Connections: Bus terminal

Construction
- Structure type: At grade

Other information
- Status: Staffed ("Midori no Madoguchi")
- Station code: JT20
- Website: Official website

History
- Opened: 1 October 1924; 102 years ago

Passengers
- FY2019: 5,833 daily

Services
Preceding station	JR East	Following station
Atami JT21 towards Itō	Saphir Odoriko (Limited service)	Odawara JT16 (Limited service) towards Tokyo or Shinjuku
Atami JT21 towards Itō or Atami	Odoriko	Odawara JT16 towards Tokyo
Atami JT21 Terminus	Tōkaidō Line	Manazuru JT19 towards Tokyo
Location
- Location within Kanagawa Prefecture Location within Kanto Area Location within Japan

Yugawara Station (湯河原駅, Yugawara-eki) is a passenger railway station located in the town of Yugawara, Ashigarashimo District, Kanagawa Prefecture, Japan, operated by JR East.

== Lines ==
Yugawara Station is served by the Tōkaidō Main Line, and is located 99.4 rail kilometers from Tokyo Station.

== Layout ==
Yugawara Station has an island platform, and a station building with automated ticket machines, Suica automated turnstiles and a "Midori no Madoguchi" service counter.

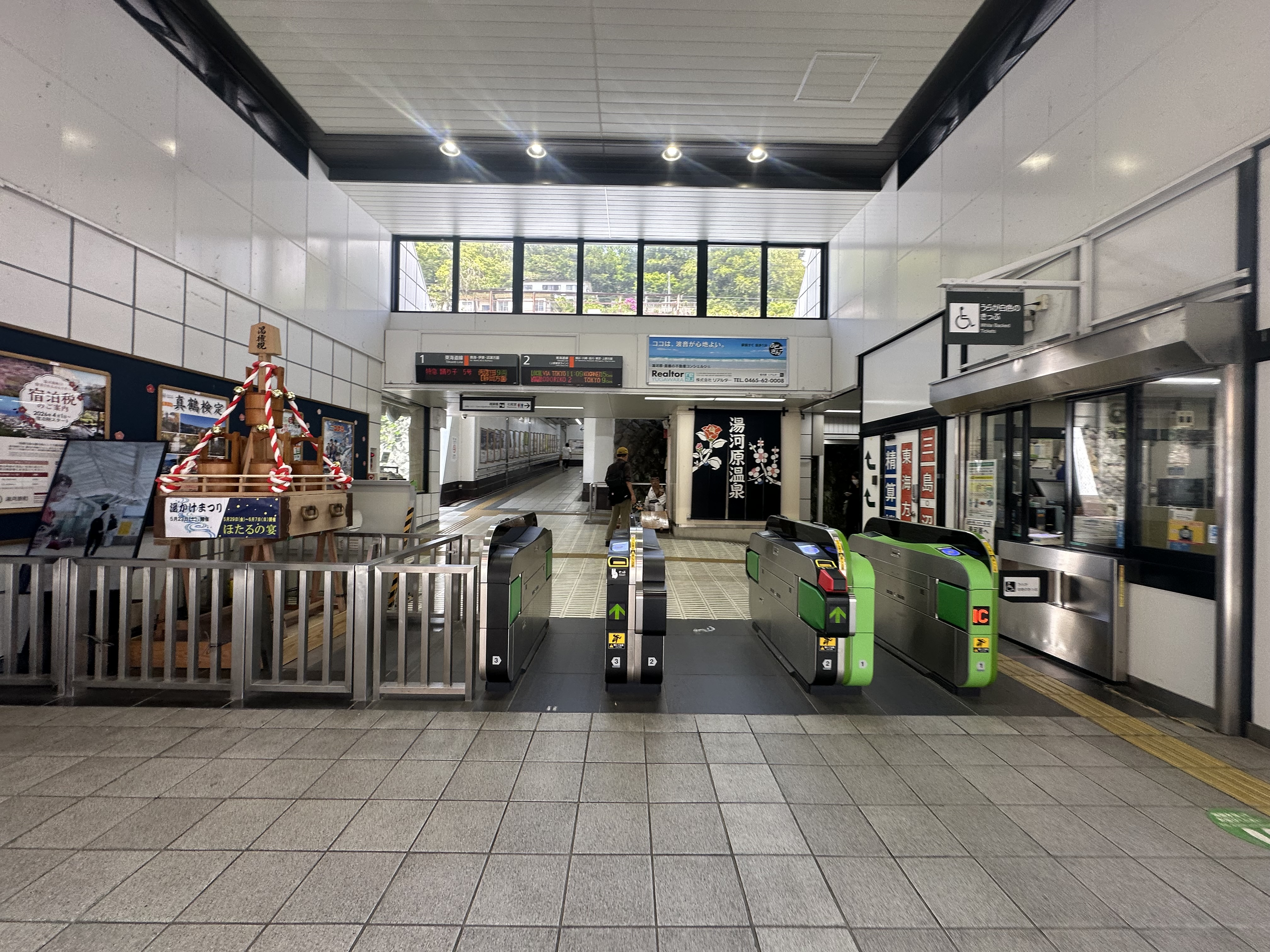
Yugawara station gate

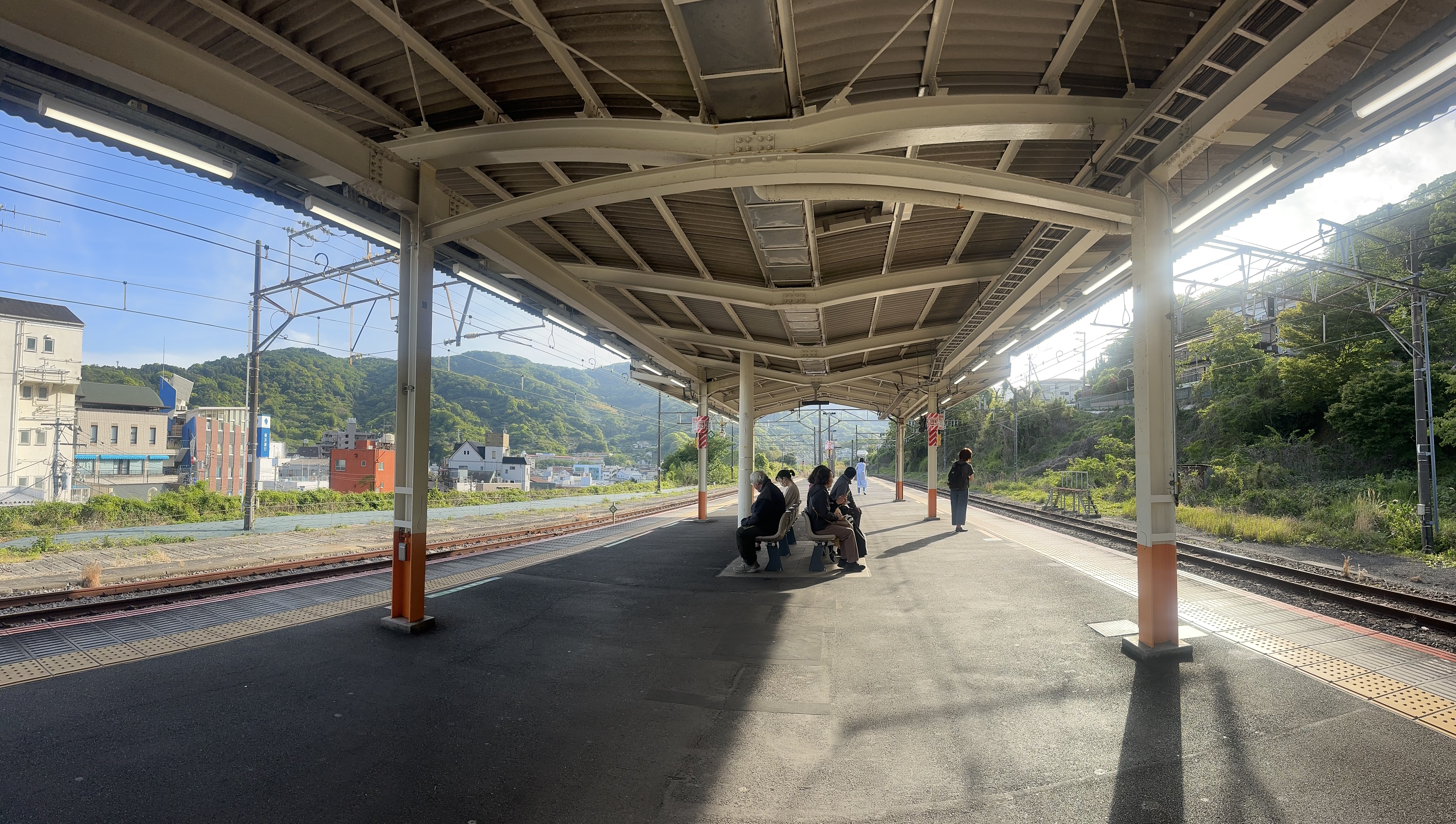
Platform

=== Platforms ===
1	Tōkaidō Line	for Atami, Mishima, Numazu; Itō Line for Itō
2	Tōkaidō Line・Ueno-Tokyo Line	for Odawara, Yokohama, Tokyo; Utsunomiya Line for Utsunomiya and Kuroiso; Takasaki Line for Takasaki and Maebashi

== Station history ==
When work began on the Tōkaidō Main Line, technology for long tunneling was limited. Initially (from 1895) the line was routed from Yugawara north to Gotemba to avoid the mountains before reaching Numazu, Shizuoka. A station was opened at Yugawara on October 1, 1924. Service to Atami began the following year initially by human-powered trolleys, followed by a steam-driven omnibus. On December 1, 1934 the Tanna Tunnel was completed, and through service on the Tōkaidō Main Line to Mishima and Numazu began. Freight services were discontinued in 1982 and small parcel service in 1985. On April 1, 1987 along with privatization and division of the Japan National Railways, East Japan Railway Company started operating this station.

== Passenger statistics ==
In fiscal 2019, the station was used by an average of 5,833 passengers daily (boarding passengers only).

The passenger figures (boarding passengers only) for previous years are as shown below.

Fiscal year	daily average
2005	6,869
2010	6,065
2015	5,986

== Surrounding area ==
- Yugawara Town Hall
- Yagawara Onsen

== See also ==
- List of railway stations in Japan
