= Manazuru Station =

Railway station in Manazuru, Kanagawa Prefecture, Japan

JT19 Manazuru Station 真鶴駅
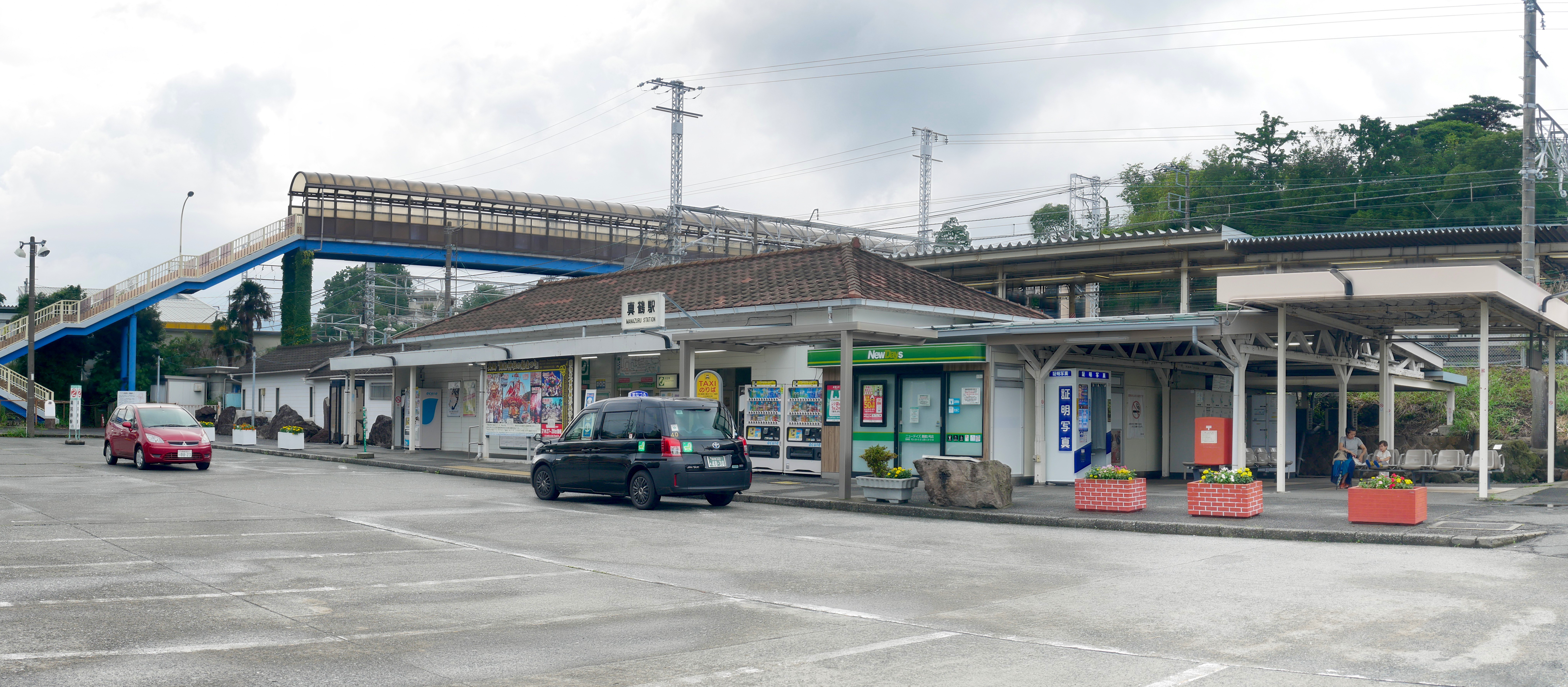
- Manazuru Station, 2020

General information
- Location: 1824 Manazuru, Manazuru Town, Ashigarashimo District; Kanagawa Prefecture 259-0201; Japan
- Coordinates: 35°09′24.5″N 139°07′56.8″E
- Operator: JR East
- Line: Tōkaidō Line
- Distance: 95.8 km (59.5 mi) from Tokyo
- Platforms: 1 island platform
- Tracks: 2
- Connections: Bus terminal

Construction
- Structure type: At grade

Other information
- Status: Staffed ("Midori no Madoguchi")
- Station code: JT19
- Website: Official website

History
- Opened: 11 July 1887; 139 years ago

Passengers
- FY2019: 3,133 daily

Services
Preceding station	JR East	Following station
Yugawara JT20 towards Atami	Tōkaidō Line	Nebukawa JT18 towards Tokyo
Location
- Location within Kanagawa Prefecture Location within Kanto Area Location within Japan

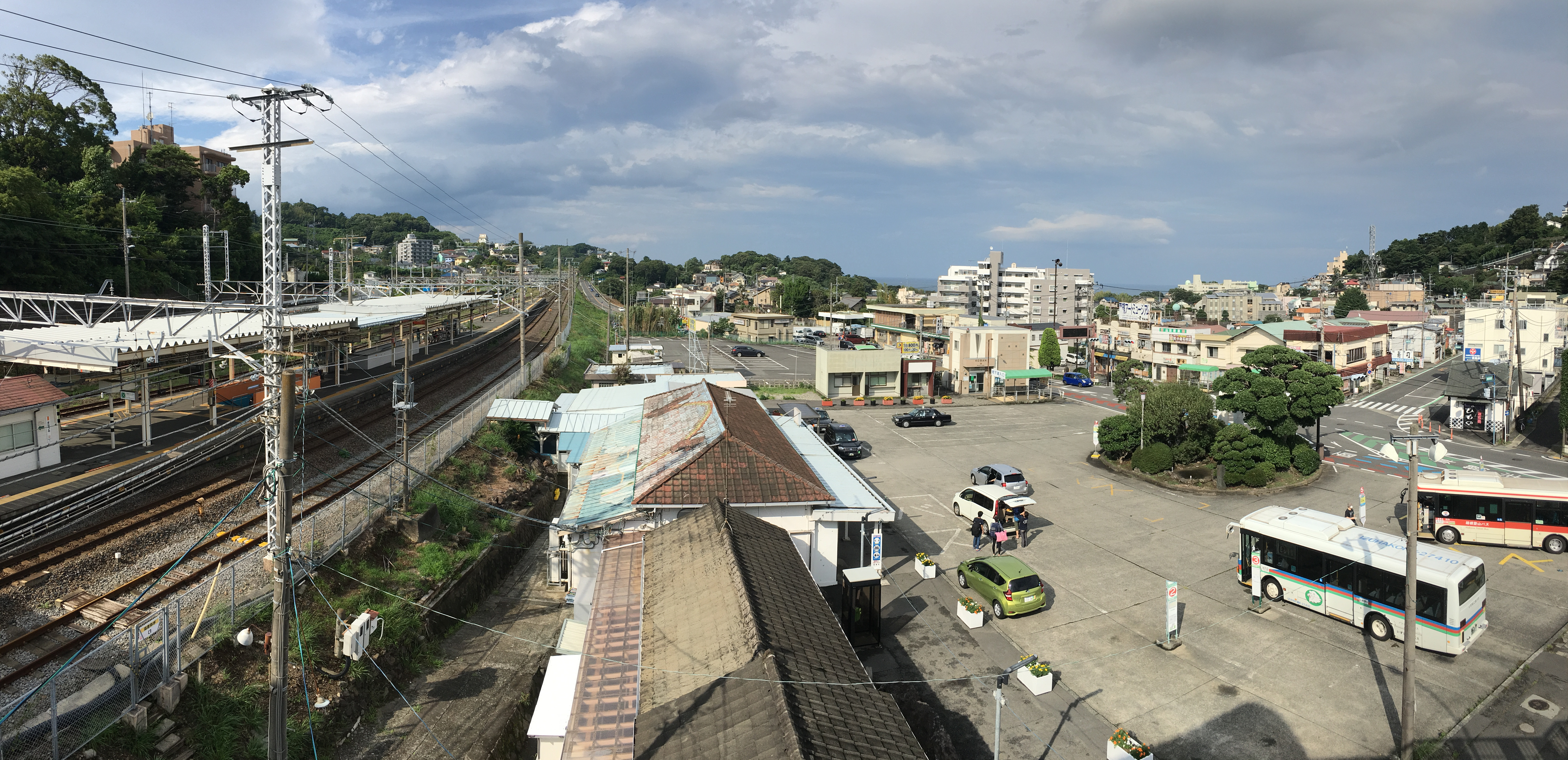
Station platforms (left) and the station building (right) from above, 2020

Manazuru Station (真鶴駅, Manazuru-eki) is a passenger railway station located in the town of Manazuru, Kanagawa Prefecture, Japan, operated by the East Japan Railway Company (JR East).

== Lines ==
Manazuru Station is served by the Tōkaidō Main Line, and is located 95.8 rail kilometers from Tokyo Station.

== Station layout ==
Manazuru Station has a single island platform serving two tracks, connected to the station building by a footbridge. The station has a "Midori no Madoguchi" service counter.

== Platforms ==
1	Tōkaidō Line	for Atami, Mishima, Numazu; Itō Line for Itō
2	Tōkaidō Line・Ueno-Tokyo Line	for Odawara, Yokohama, Tokyo; Utsunomiya Line for Utsunomiya and Kuroiso; Takasaki Line for Takasaki and Maebashi

== Station history ==
Manazuru Station was opened on July 11, 1887 for both freight and passenger service on the Atami Line of the Japan National Railways. With the opening of the Tanna Tunnel, the Atami Line became the Tōkaidō Main Line on December 1, 1934. Regularly scheduled freight services were discontinued in 1970, and parcel services by 1972. Freight services were resumed in March 1987. With the dissolution and privatization of the JNR on April 1, 1987, the station came under the control of the East Japan Railway Company. Automated turnstiles using the Suica IC Card system came into operation from November 18, 2001. Freight services were discontinued again in April 2007

== Passenger statistics ==
In fiscal 2019, the station was used by an average of 3,133 passengers daily (boarding passengers only).

The passenger figures (boarding passengers only) for previous years are as shown below.

Fiscal year	daily average
2005	4,161
2010	3,781
2015	3,444

== Surrounding area ==
- Manazuru Town Hall
- Manazuru Municipal Manazuru Junior High School
- Manazuru Municipal Manazuru Elementary School

== See also ==
- List of railway stations in Japan
