= Rosa 'Veilchenblau' =

Rose cultivar

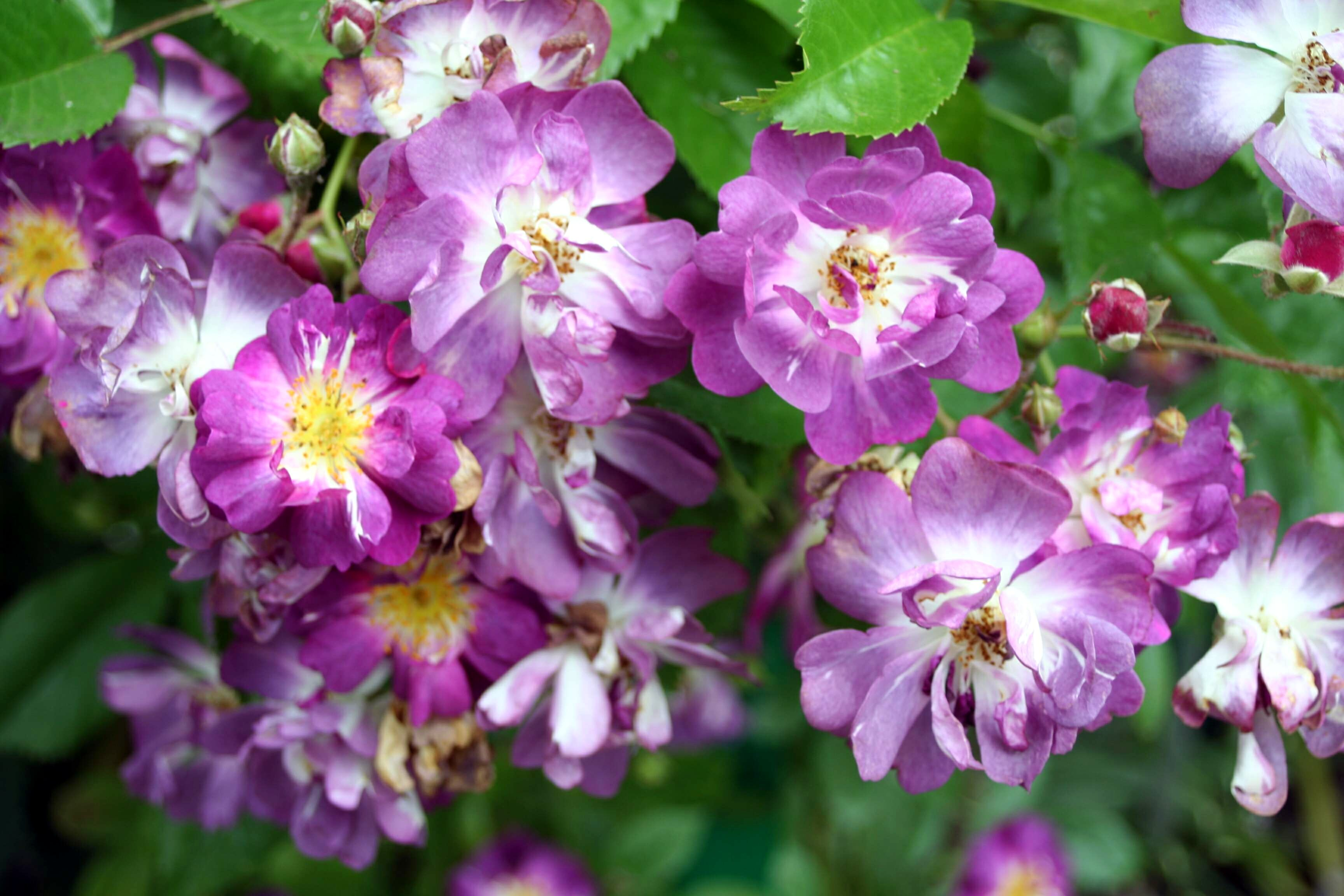
- Genus: Rosa hybrid
- Hybrid parentage: 'Turner's Crimson Rambler' × 'Souvenir de Brod'
- Cultivar group: Hybrid Multiflora
- Cultivar: 'Veilchenblau'
- Marketing names: Bleu-Violet, Blue Rambler, Blue Rosalie, Violet Blue
- Origin: Kiese, introduced by J.C. Schmidt, Germany, 1909

Rosa 'Veilchenblau' is a mauve hybrid multiflora rose cultivar and the best known violet rambler. Other names are 'Bleu-Violet', 'Blue Rambler', 'Blue Rosalie' and 'Violet Blue'.

The cultivar was bred by Hermann Kiese in Germany in 1909. Its parents are the red hybrid multiflora 'Crimson Rambler' (Japan, before 1893) and the mauve hybrid setigera 'Souvenir de Brod' (Geschwind, 1884). It was introduced by Johann Christoph Schmidt from Erfurt, where Kiese had been employed until he started his own nursery in 1904.

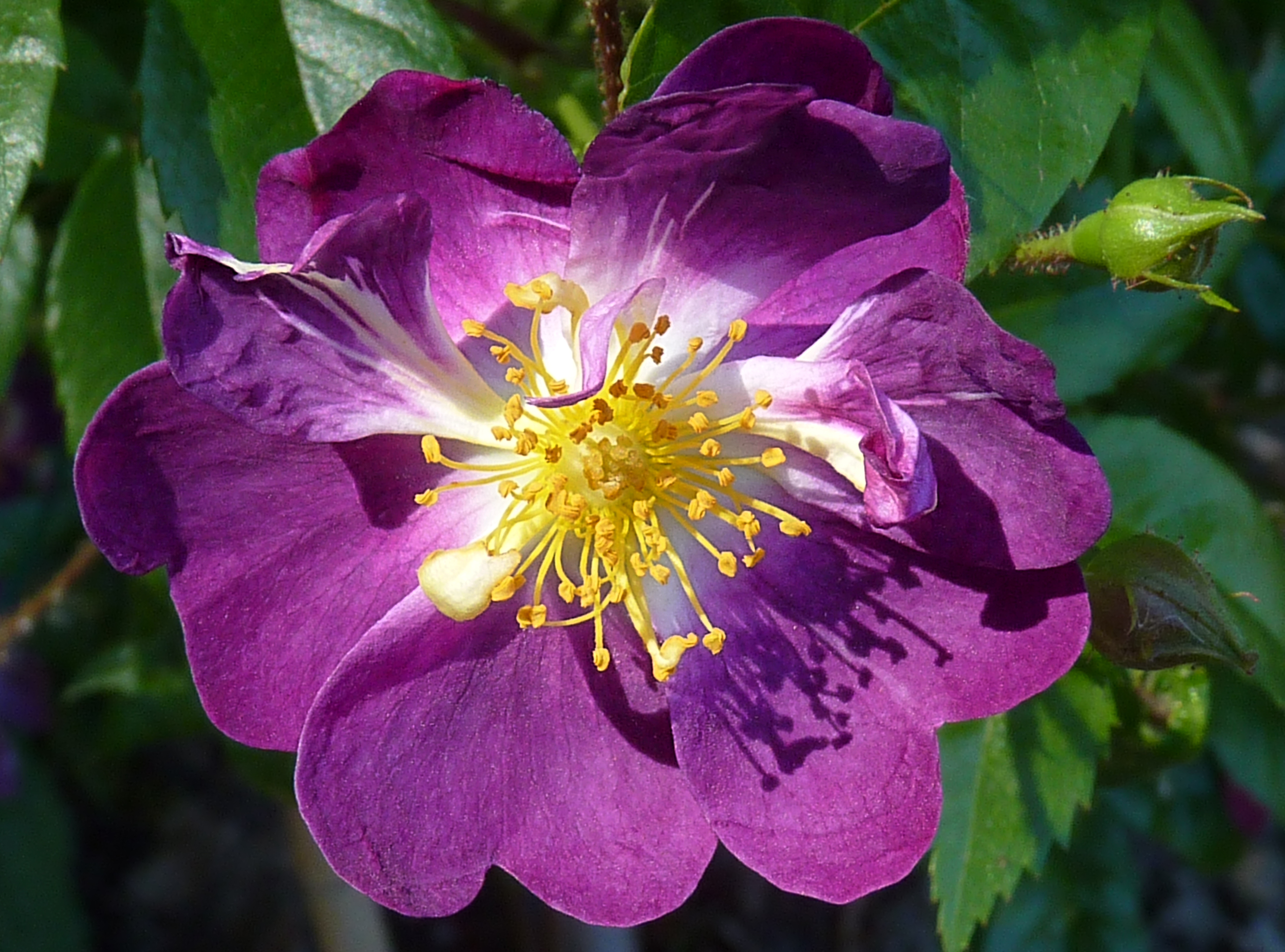
'Veilchenblau'

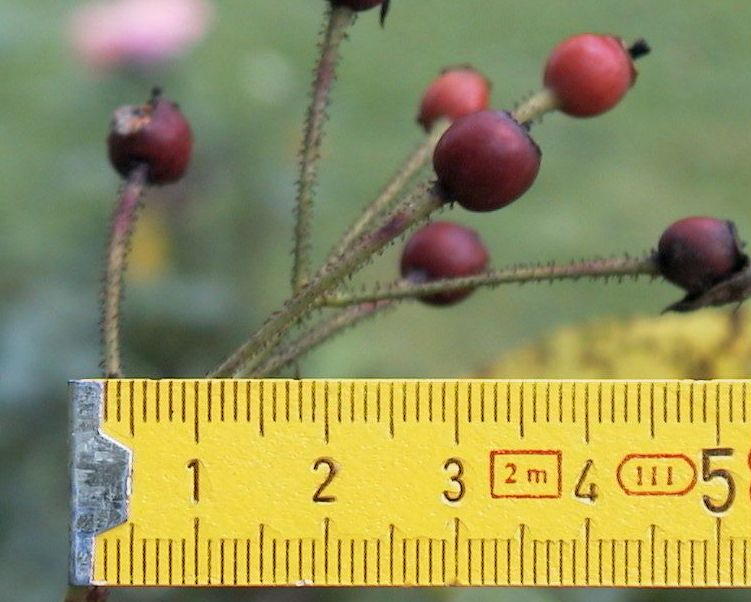
rose hips

'Veilchenblau' has small, semi-double flowers with an average diameter of 3 to 4 centimetres (1.2 to 1.6 in) and a sweet, fruity fragrance reminiscent of lily-of-the-valley.

The crimson buds appear in late spring and early summer (June to July) in loose clusters of 10 to 30, and open to dark, purple violet flowers with a white center, that age to a grayish mauve, especially under hot conditions. As they remain long on the plant, all hues can appear simultaneously. The cultivar blooms abundantly for a period of three to four weeks. In autumn, 'Veilchenblau' develops small brown-red hips of only 5 to 10 mm length, decorating the shrub into the winter.

The cultivar is a robust, near-thornless rambler, growing from 3 to 6 metres (10′ to 20′) in height, but can reach heights of over 10 metres. It has large, glossy, light to medium green foliage, tolerates heat, half-shade and poor soils, and is winter hardy up to −29 °C (USDA zone 5), but should be planted in airy locations, as it is susceptible to mildew. The cultivar was used as stock plant and in rose hybridisation, and is easy to propagate through cuttings. Some of its seedlings are from the beginning of the 20th century are 'Rose Marie Viaud' (Igoult, 1924), 'Violette' (Turbat, 1921), 'Schloß Friedenstein' (Schmidt, 1915), and 'Mosel' (Lambert, 1920).

In 1993, 'Veilchenblau' was granted the Award of Garden Merit by the Royal Horticultural Society.
