= Nebukawa Station =

Railway station in Odawara, Kanagawa Prefecture, Japan

JT18 Nebukawa Station 根府川駅
- Nebukawa Station building in June, 2024

General information
- Location: 109 Nebukawa, Odawara City, Kanagawa Prefecture 250-0024; Japan
- Coordinates: 35.202722°N 139.138472°E
- Operator: JR East
- Line: Tōkaidō Line
- Distance: 90.4 km (56.2 mi) from Tokyo
- Platforms: 2 island platforms
- Tracks: 3
- Connections: Bus terminal

Construction
- Structure type: At grade

Other information
- Status: Unstaffed
- Station code: JT18
- Website: Official website

History
- Opened: 21 December 1922; 103 years ago

Passengers
- FY2008: 639 daily

Services
Preceding station	JR East	Following station
Manazuru JT19 towards Atami	Tōkaidō Line	Hayakawa JT17 towards Tokyo
Location
- Location within Kanagawa Prefecture Location within Kanto Area Location within Japan

Nebukawa Station (根府川駅, Nebukawa-eki) is a passenger railway station located in the city of Odawara, Kanagawa Prefecture, Japan, operated by the East Japan Railway Company (JR East).

== Lines ==
Nebukawa Station is served by the Tōkaidō Main Line, and is located 90.4 kilometers from the line's terminus at Tokyo Station.

== Station layout ==
The station consists of two island platform serving four tracks. The two platforms are connected to the station building by a footbridge. Track one is not in use, while track three is used for local trains to stop while rapid trains pass. The station is unattended.

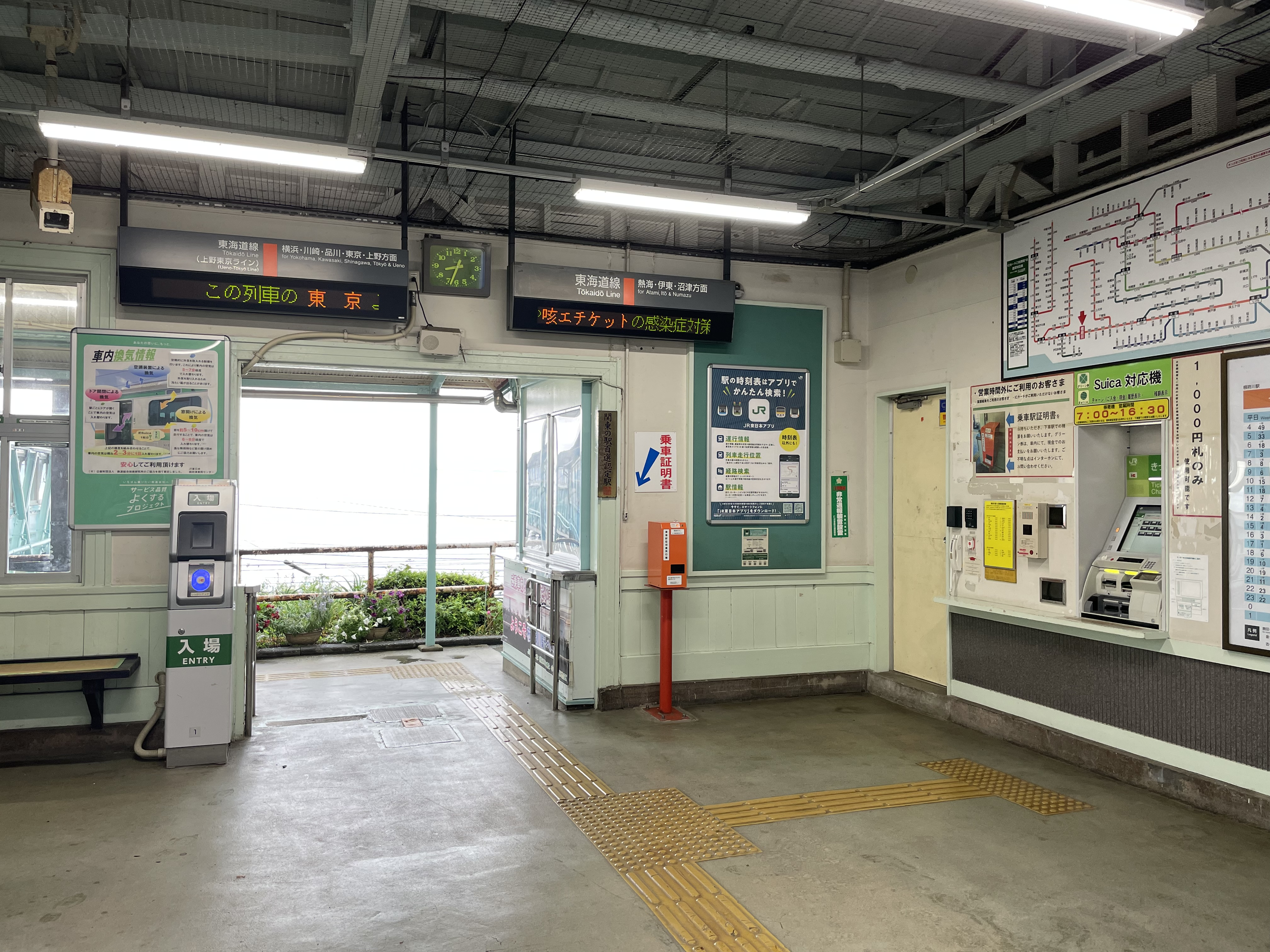
Ticket gate in July, 2022

=== Platforms ===
2	Tōkaidō Line・Ueno-Tokyo Line	for Odawara, Yokohama, Tokyo; Utsunomiya Line for Utsunomiya and Kuroiso; Takasaki Line for Takasaki and Maebashi
3,4	Tōkaidō Line	for Atami, Mishima, Numazu; Itō Line for Itō

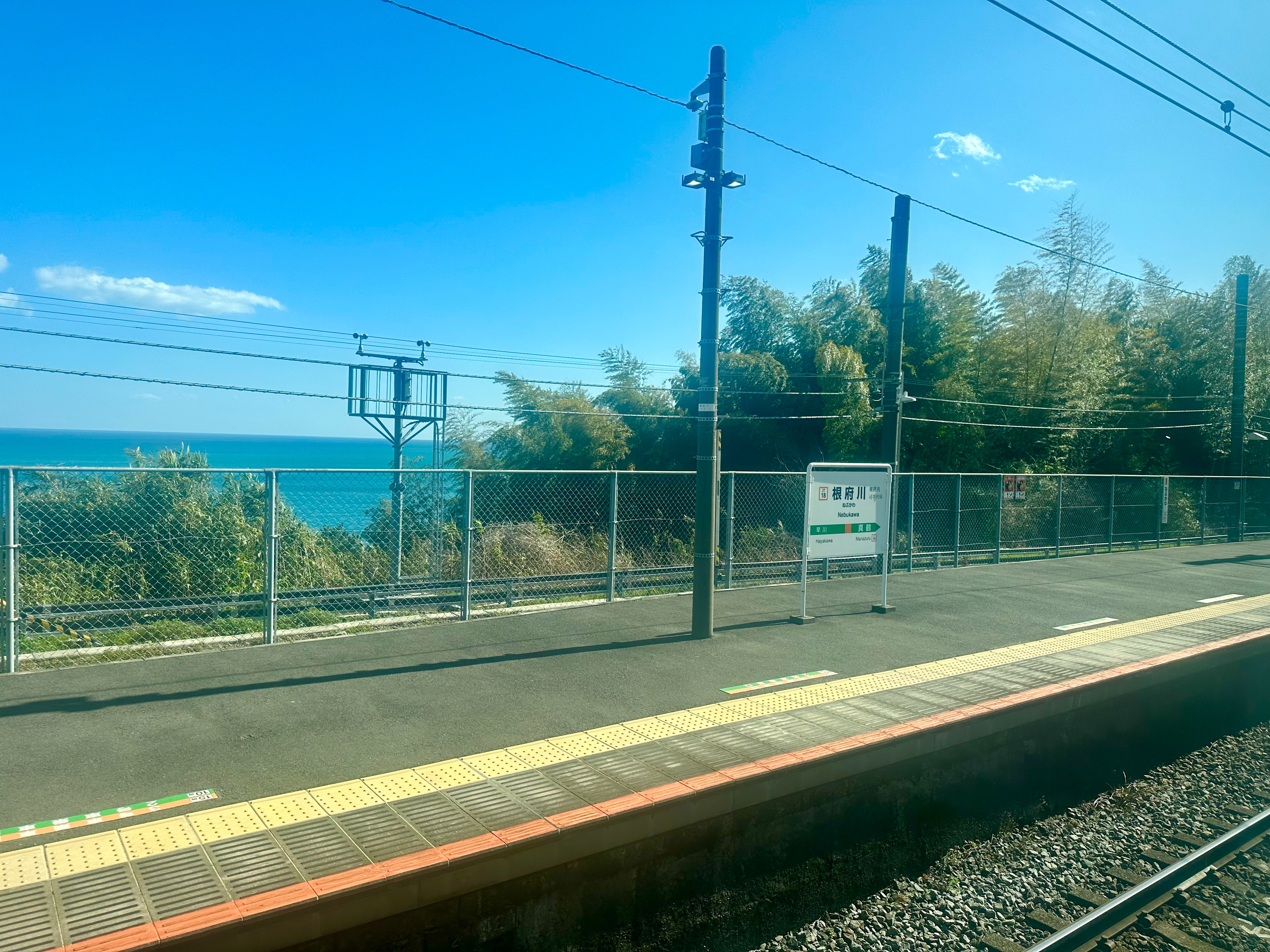
The ocean seen from the platform, 2024

== Station history ==
Nebukawa Station first opened on December 21, 1922, when the section of the Atami-Odawara Line connecting Odawara with Manazuru was completed. On September 1, 1923, Nebukawa Station accident occurred due to the Great Kanto earthquake.

From December 1, 1934 the Odawara-Atami Line became part of the re-routed Tōkaidō Main Line following the opening of the Tanna Tunnel. Regularly scheduled freight services were discontinued in 1970, and small parcel services by 1972. With the dissolution and privatization of the JNR on April 1, 1987, the station came under the control of the East Japan Railway Company. Automated turnstiles using the Suica IC Card system came into operation from November 18, 2001. The “Midori no Madoguchi” service counter was discontinued from 2002.

== Passenger statistics ==
In fiscal 2008, the station was used by an average of 639 passengers daily.

== Surrounding area ==
- Nebugawa Onsen
- Enoura Observatory
- Shiraito River
- Enoura beach
- Odawara Municipal Kataura Elementary School

== See also ==
- List of railway stations in Japan
- Nebukawa Station accident (1923)
