= Nebukawa Station accident =

1923 railway accident in Japan

Coordinates: 35°12′11.2″N 139°8′29.1″E

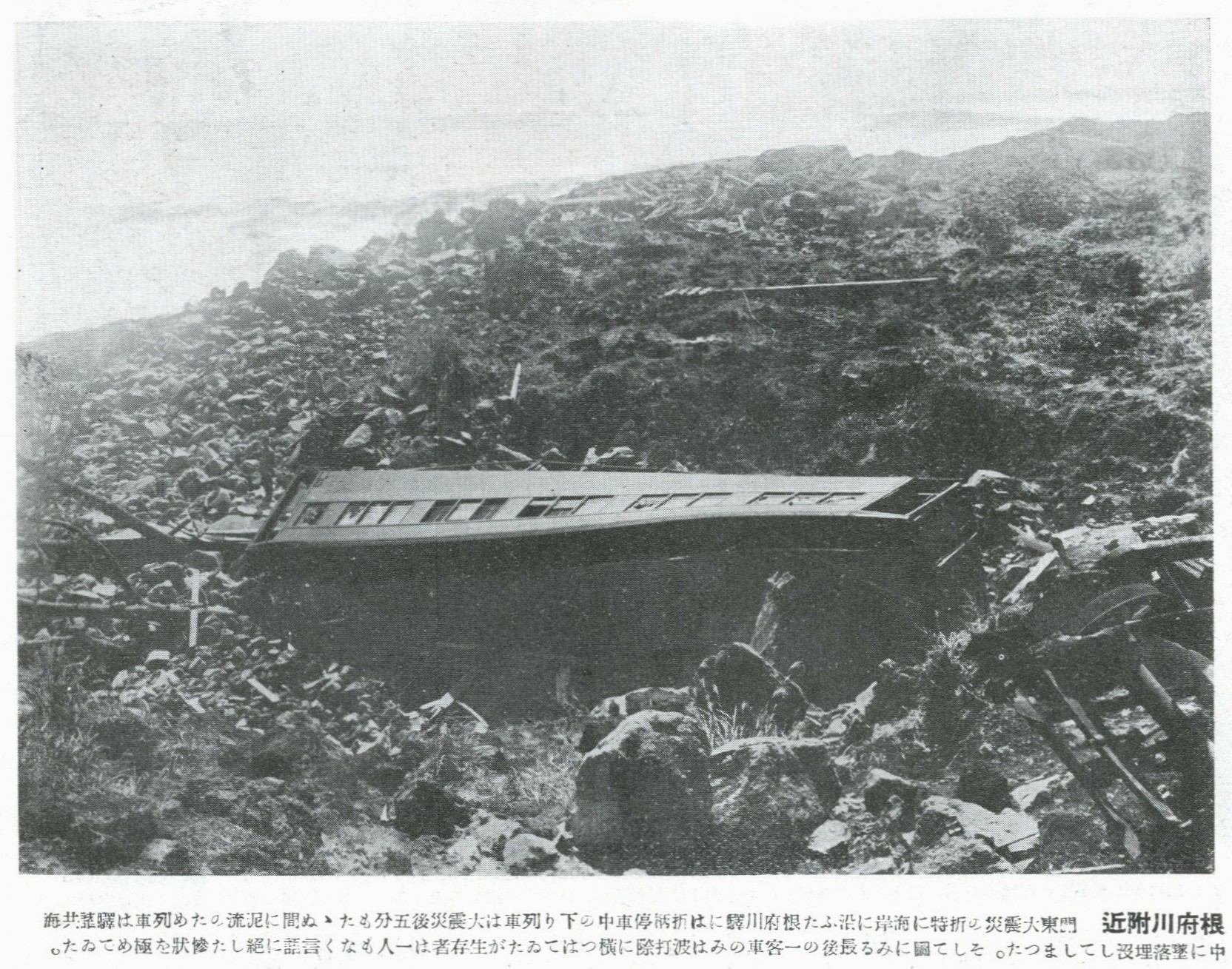

Details
- Date: September 1, 1923; 11:58
- Location: Nebukawa Station, Odawara, Kanagawa Prefecture
- Country: Japan
- Line: Atami-Odawara Line
- Incident type: Derailment and infrastructure destruction
- Cause: Landslide due to Great Kanto Earthquake

Statistics
- Trains: 1
- Deaths: 112, plus an additional 200 deaths from people near the station at the time of the landslide

The Nebukawa Station accident (Japanese: 根府川駅列車転落事故) is a railway accident that occurred in Japan on September 1, 1923.

== Overview ==
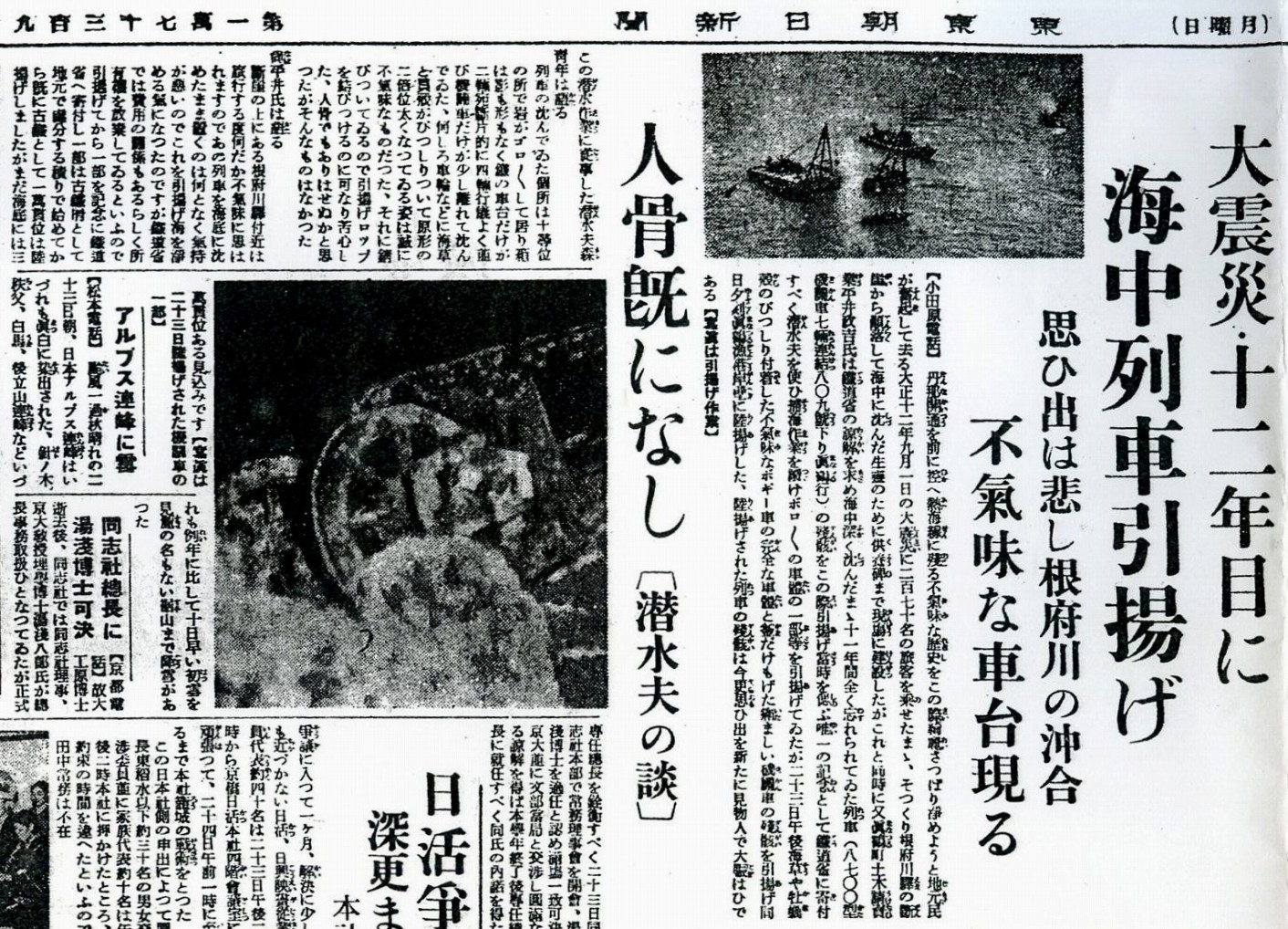
salvage of the train

During the Great Kantō earthquake, at two minutes before noon on September 1, 1923, the local train of the Atami-Odawara Line was travelling south towards Manazuru and was stopped at Nebukawa Station. The earthquake caused a mudslide, which covered the station, sweeping the station building, platforms, and train into the ocean, 45 meters down the slope on which the station was built. The Type 960 locomotive and the first 7 cars in the train were submerged, with only the 8th car remaining above water. The train disaster killed 112 people, with an additional 200 people living in the close vicinity of the station also killed by the landslide. The wreck of the train and tracks were salvaged in September 1932 for scrap metal. The Tokyo-bound train on the same line was stopped in the middle of the bridge over the Nebukawa River just before the station, and was overwhelmed by a 35-foot tsunami, which swept the locomotive into the sea, killing six people.

== See also ==
- Lists of rail accidents
