= Hermann Kiese =

German gardener

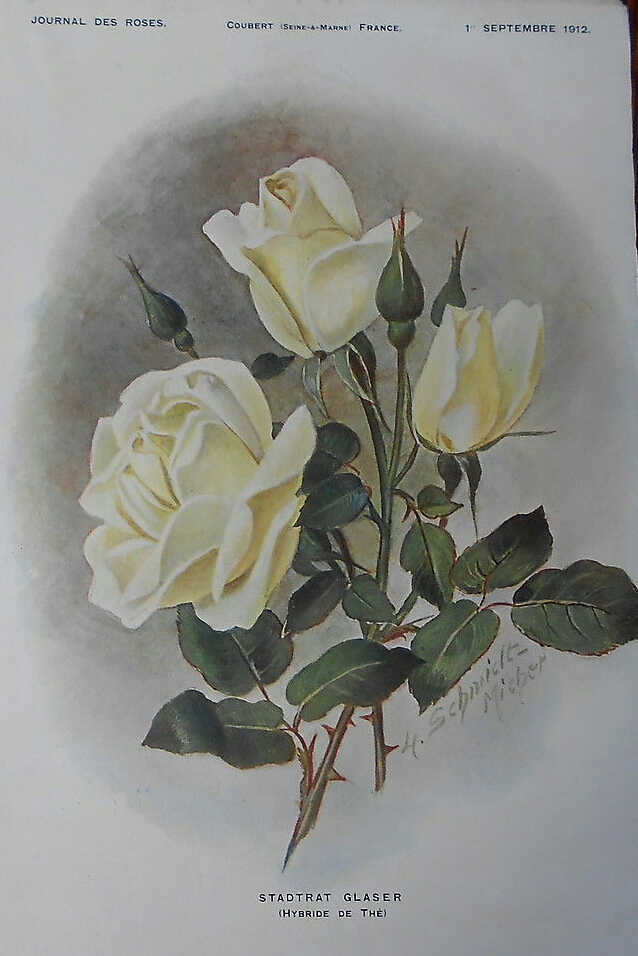
Rose 'Stadtrat Glaser' (1910).

Hermann Kiese (1865–1923) was a German rosarian known for his breeding of rose cultivars. Born in Vieselbach, which is now in Thuringia, Germany on 8 May 1865. He worked for 22 years as gardener for the Johann Christoff Schmidt rosarium in Erfurt. In 1904 he started his own nursery in Vieselbach near Erfurt. Hermann Kiese is one of the founders of the Verein Deutscher Rosenfreunde – VDR (Union of German Friends of Roses). From 1911 to 1916 he was chief editor of the magazine Rosen-Zeitung. Consequently, he shared this responsibility with Friedrich Ries till 1919.

Hermann Kiese died on 22 September 1923

He specialized in hybrid Polyanthas and Climbing Roses, but introduced some Hybrid Teas. Among his numerous creations are:

- Leuchtstern (1899),
- Lohengrin (1903),
- Blumenschmidt (1906),
- Tausendschön (1906),
- Kronprinzessin Cecilie (1907),
- Otto von Bismarck (1908),
- Eisenach (1909),
- Veilchenblau (1909),
- Kiese (1910),
- Weisse Tausendschön (1910),
- Deutschland (1910),
- Hermann Lüder (1910)',
- Lilli von Posern (1910),
- Lisbeth von Kamecke (1910),
- Nordlicht (1910),
- Perle von Britz (1910),
- Stadtrat Glaser (1910),
- Wartburg (1910),
- Andreas Hofer (1911),
- Gräfin Chotek (1911),
- Frau Anna Lautz (1912),
- Paula Clegg (1912),
- Andenken an Breslau (1913),
- Grossherzogin Feodora von Sachsen (1913),
- Hackeburg (1913),
- Loreley (1913),
- Ludwig Möller (1915),
- Siegesperle (1915),
- Hindenburg (1916),
- Dannenberg (1916),
- Admiral Tirpitz (1918),
- Gruß an Frankfurt (1918),
- Freudenfeuer (1918),
- Fürst Leopold IV zu Schaumburg-Lippe (1918),
- Gertrud Kiese (1918),
- Fliegerheld Öhring (1919),
- Deutsche Hoffnung (1919),
- Heldengruß (1919),
- Gruß am Weimar (1919),
- Rudelsburg (1919),
- Schön Ingeborg (1921),
- Käthchen von Heilbronn (1922),
- Louis Kahle (1922),
- Vater Rhein (1922),
- Perle von Hohenstein (1923),
- Frau Prof. Gnau (1925),
- Kleine Ech (1925),
- Weiße Echo (1925),

After his death, following cultivars have been attributed to Hermann Kiese:

- Märchen (1927),
- Martin Liebau (1930)

Rosarian Philipp Geduldig named a cultivar "Hermann Kiese" in 1906 to honor the rose-breeder.
