= List of destroyers of the United States Navy =

Ships of the United States Navy

Ships in current service
- Current ships

Ships grouped alphabetically
- A–B; C; D–F; G–H; I–K; L; M; N–O; P; Q–R; S; T–V; W–Z

Ships grouped by type
- Aircraft carriers; Airships; Amphibious warfare ships; Auxiliaries; Battlecruisers; Battleships; Cruisers; Destroyers; Destroyer escorts; Destroyer leaders; Escort carriers; Frigates; Hospital ships; Littoral combat ships; Mine warfare vessels; Monitors; Oilers; Patrol vessels; Registered civilian vessels; Sailing frigates; Steam frigates; Steam gunboats; Ships of the line; Sloops of war; Submarines; Torpedo boats; Torpedo retrievers; Unclassified miscellaneous; Yard and district craft

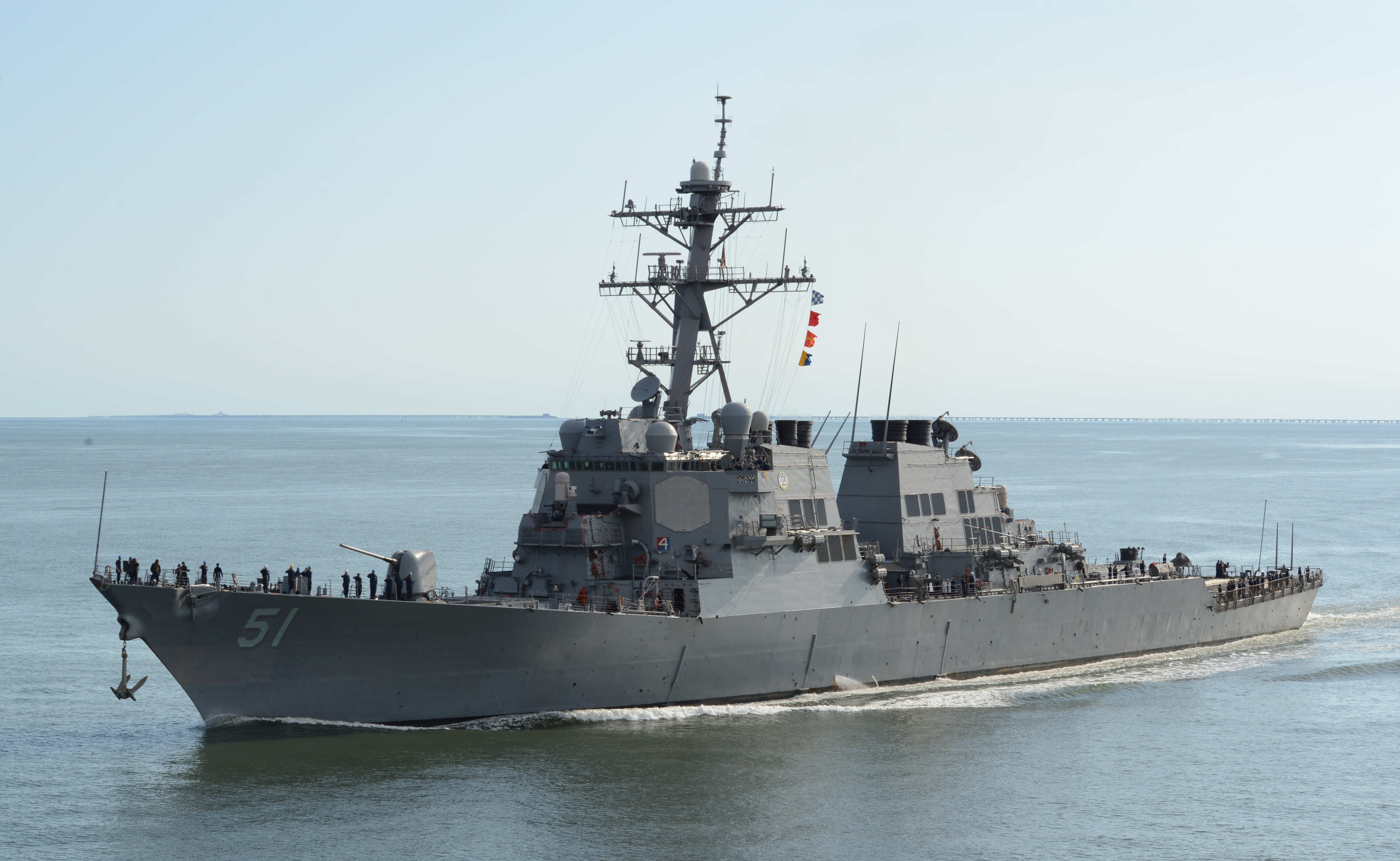
USS Arleigh Burke (DDG-51)

This is a list of destroyers of the United States Navy, sorted by hull number. It includes all of the series DD, DL, DDG, DLG, and DLGN.

CG-47 Ticonderoga and CG-48 Yorktown were approved as destroyers (DDG-47 and DDG-48) and redesignated cruisers before being laid down; it is uncertain whether CG-49 Vincennes and CG-50 Valley Forge were ever authorized as destroyers by the United States Congress (though the fact that the DDG sequence resumes with DDG-51 Arleigh Burke argues that they were).

== Destroyer types listed ==
DD
Destroyer
DL
Destroyer Leader (later Frigate) (retired)
DDG
Destroyer, Guided Missile
FFG
Frigate, Guided Missile (abolished 30 June 1975)
FFGN
Frigate, Guided Missile, Nuclear-Propulsion (abolished 30 June 1975)

=== Other destroyer types ===
These destroyer types were destroyers listed in this article which were later converted to other purposes, and so are also listed in other articles.

- DE: Destroyer escorts:

List of destroyer escorts of the United States Navy

- DM: Destroyer minelayers:

List of mine warfare vessels of the United States Navy § Light minelayers (DM)

- DMS: Destroyer minesweepers:

List of mine warfare vessels of the United States Navy § High speed/Destroyer minesweepers (DMS)

- APD: High-speed transports, destroyers converted to land Marines ashore:

List of United States Navy amphibious warfare ships § High-speed transport (APD)

- AVD: Destroyer seaplane tenders:

List of auxiliaries of the United States Navy § Destroyer seaplane tenders (AVD) - The first seven of these ships were originally classed as Small seaplane tenders (AVP), then changed to AVD

== Destroyers ==
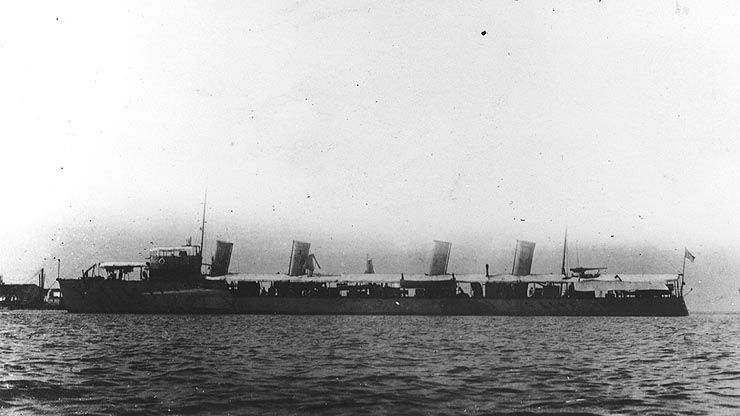
USS Bainbridge (DD-1)

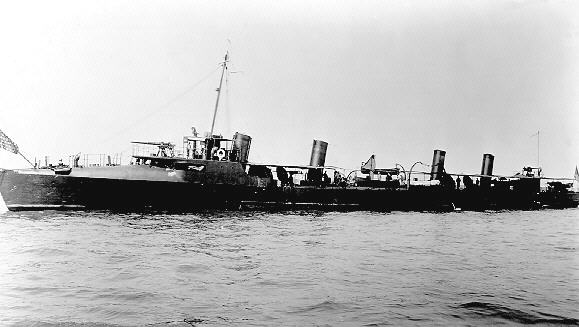
USS Truxtun (DD-14)

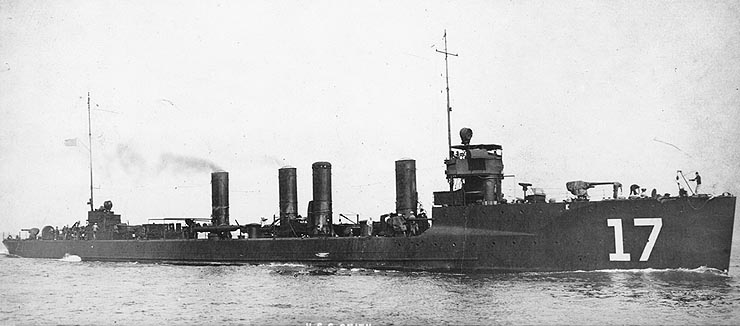
USS Smith (DD-17)

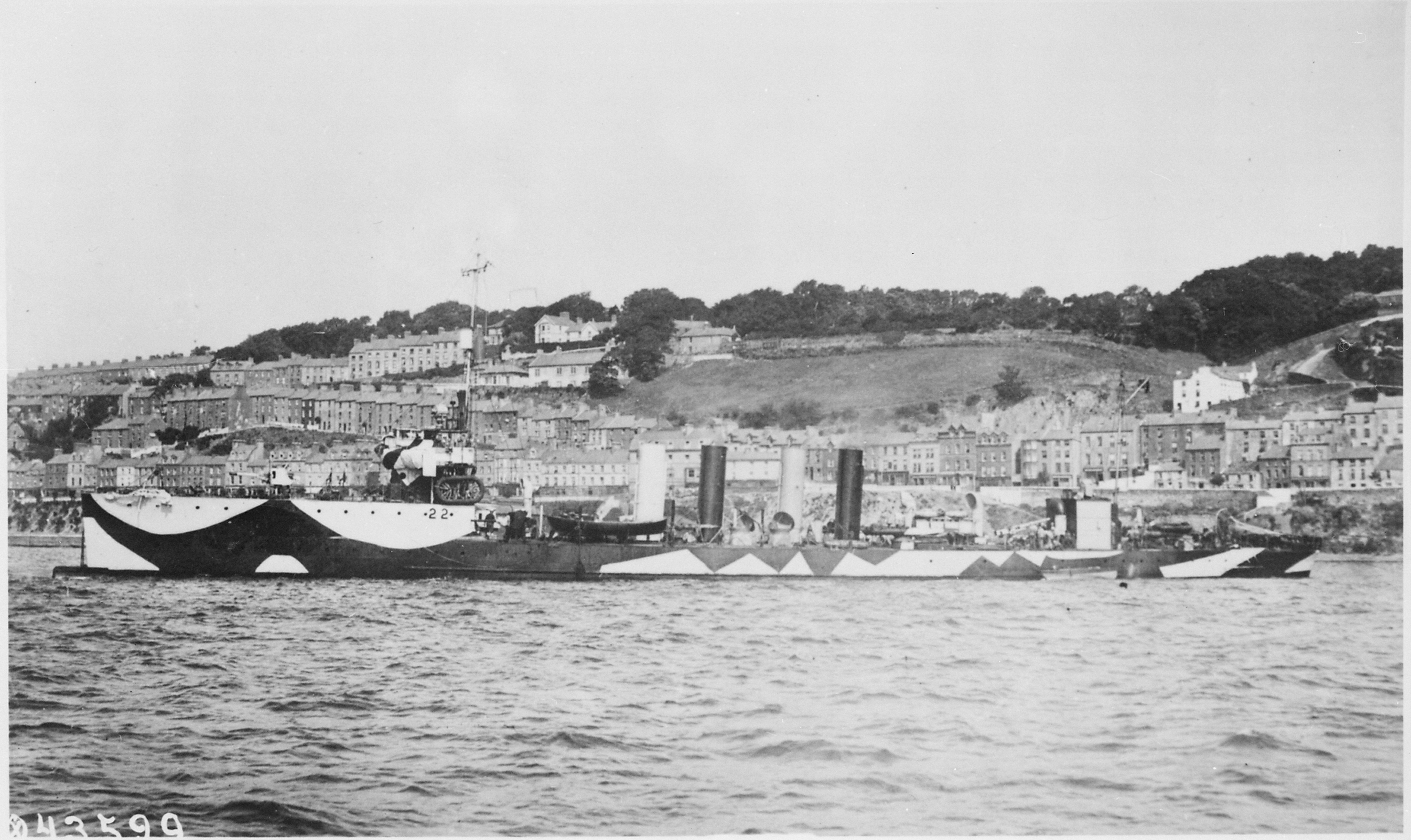
USS Paulding (DD-22)

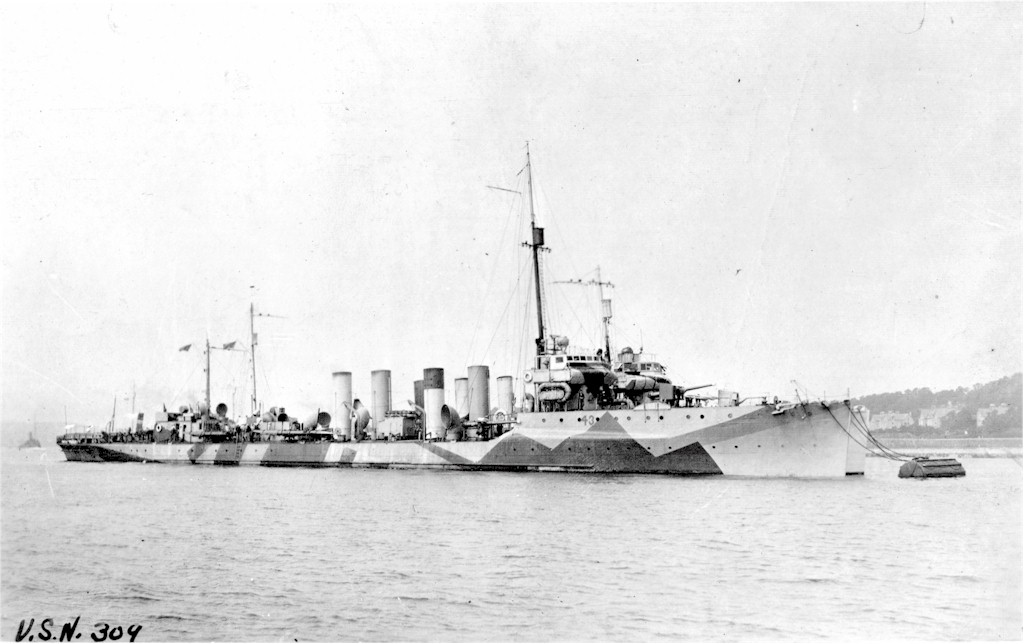
USS Cassin (DD-43)

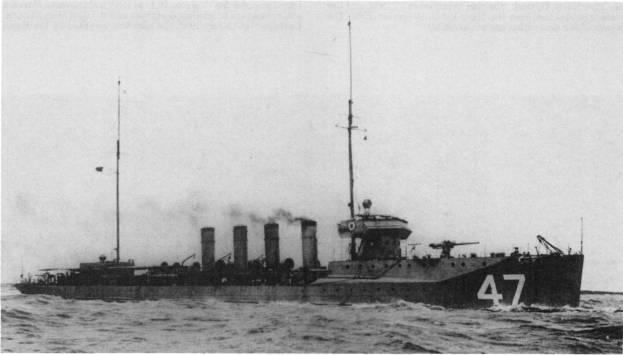
USS Aylwin (DD-47)

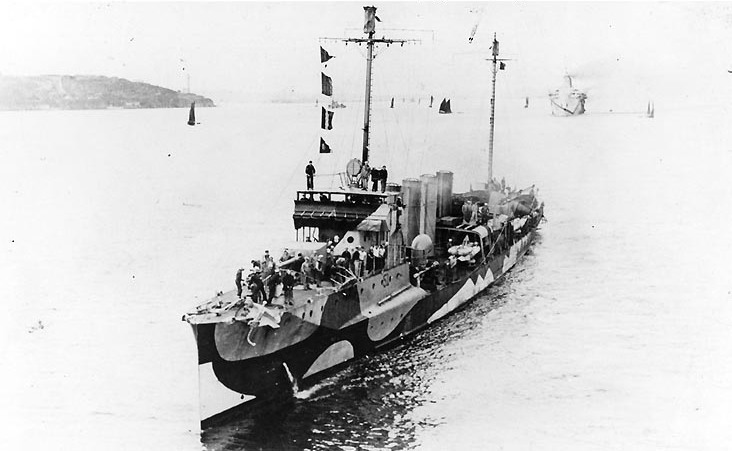
USS O'Brien (DD-51)

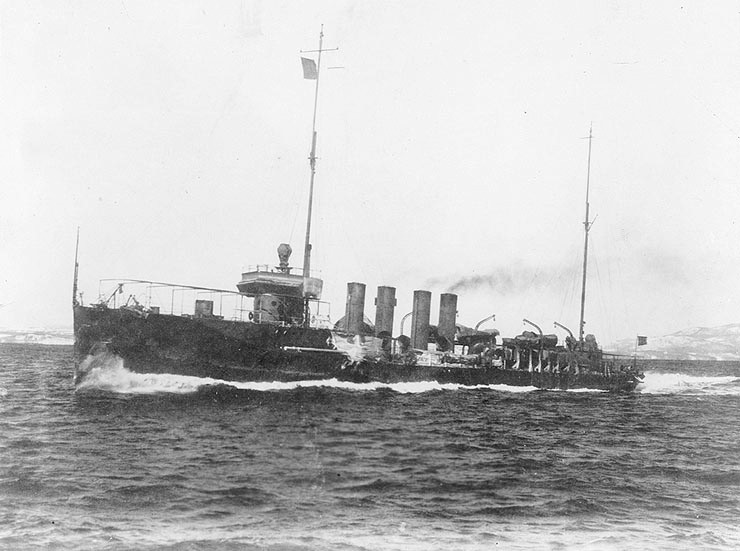
USS Tucker (DD-57)

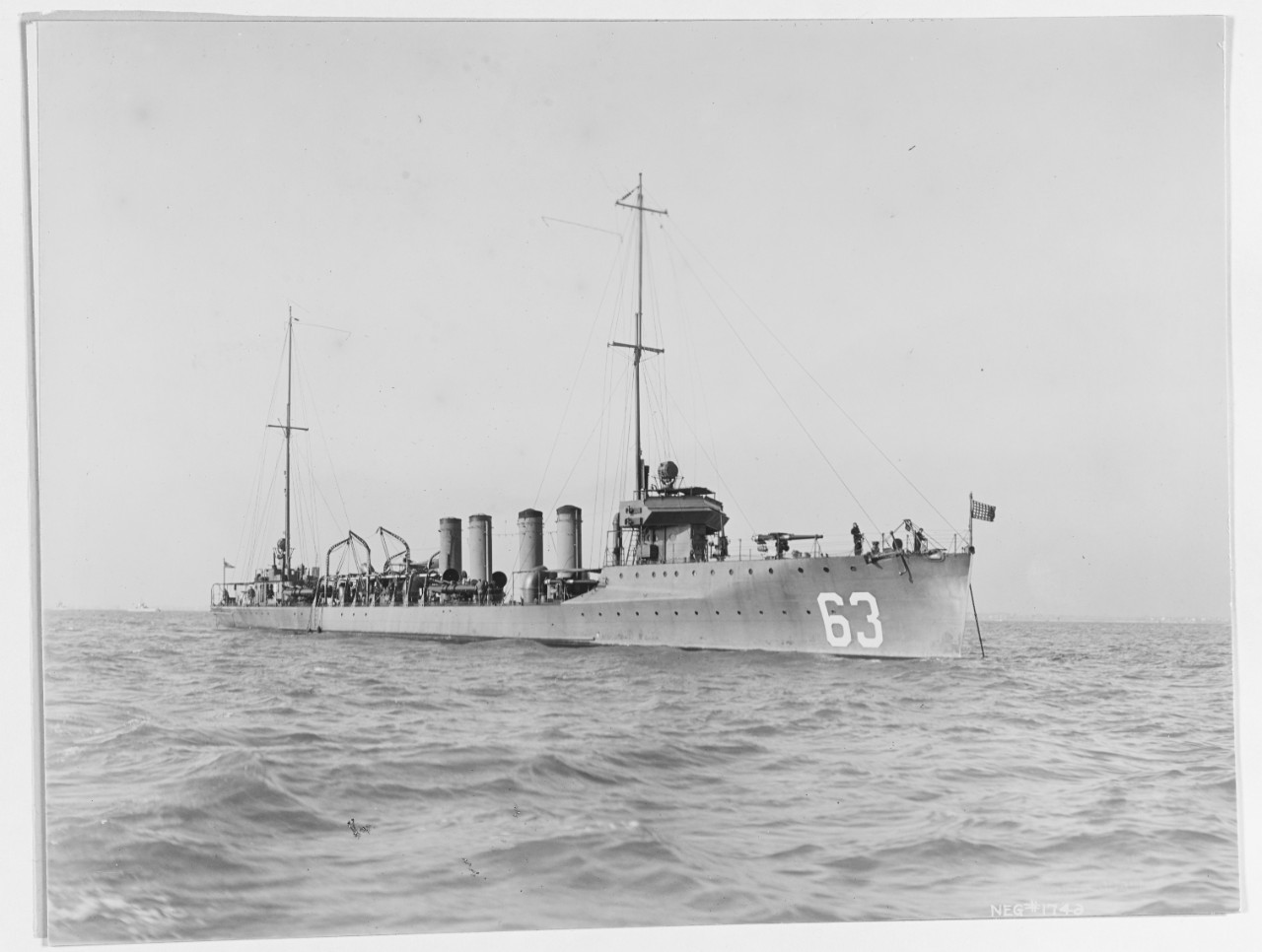
USS Sampson (DD-63)

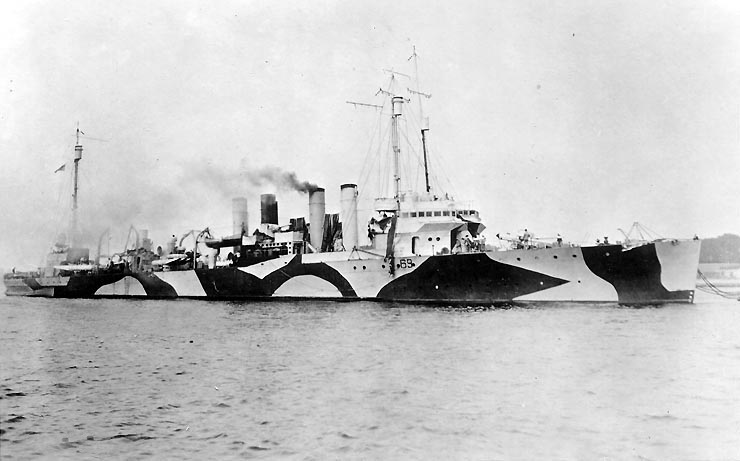
USS Caldwell (DD-69)

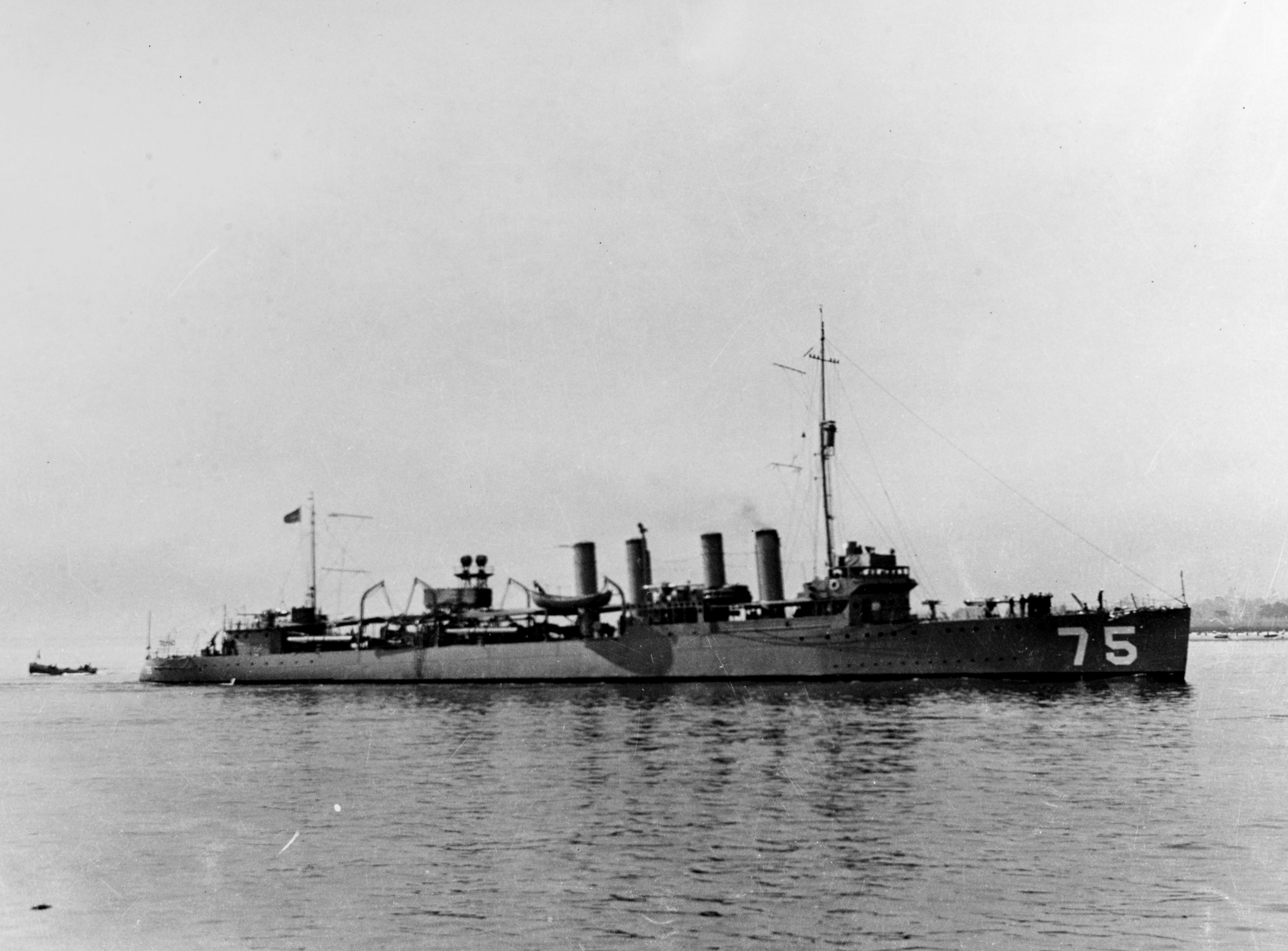
USS Wickes (DD-75)

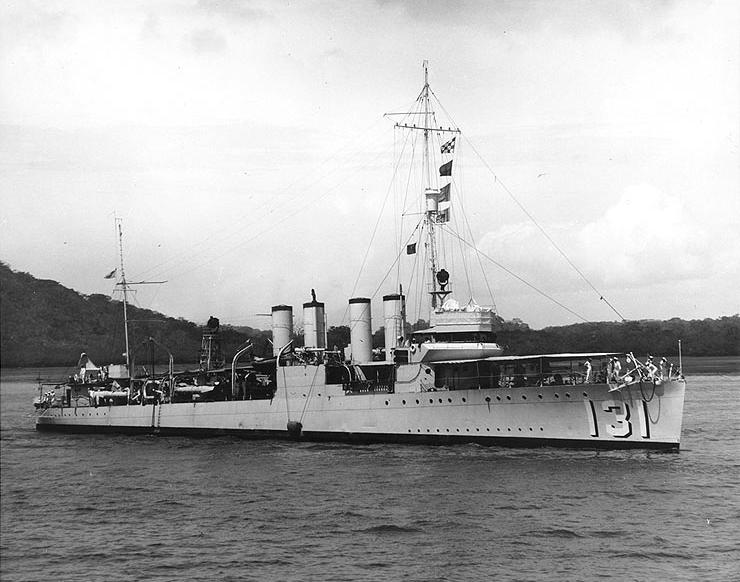
USS Buchanan (DD-131)

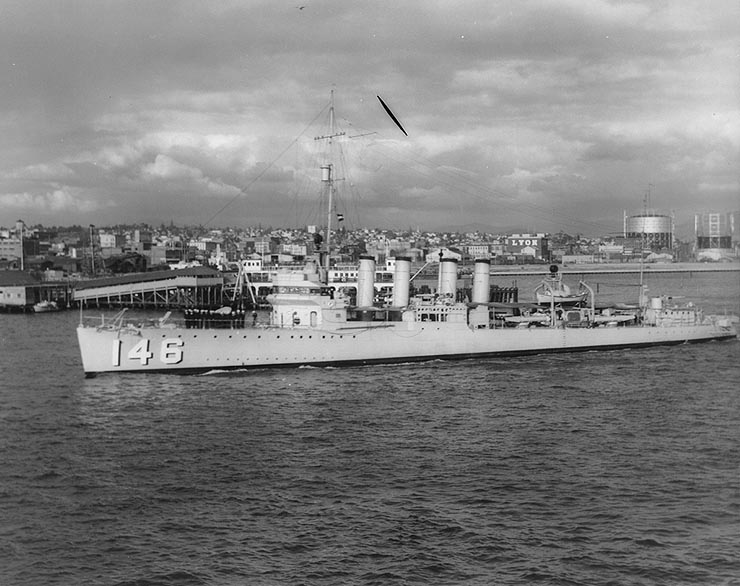
USS Elliot (DD-146)

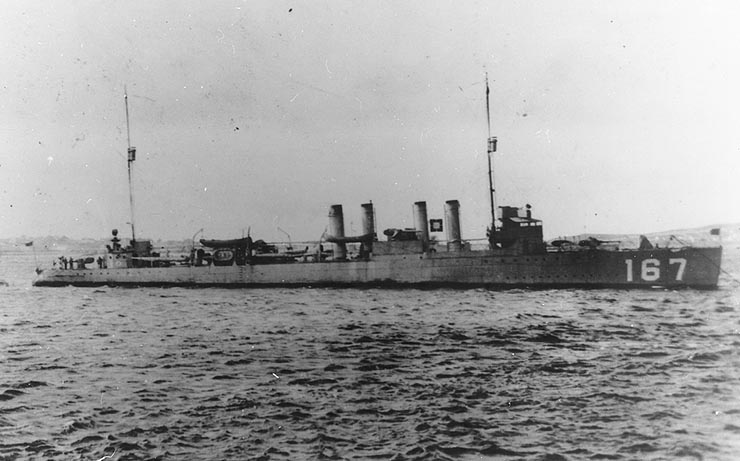
USS Cowell (DD-167)

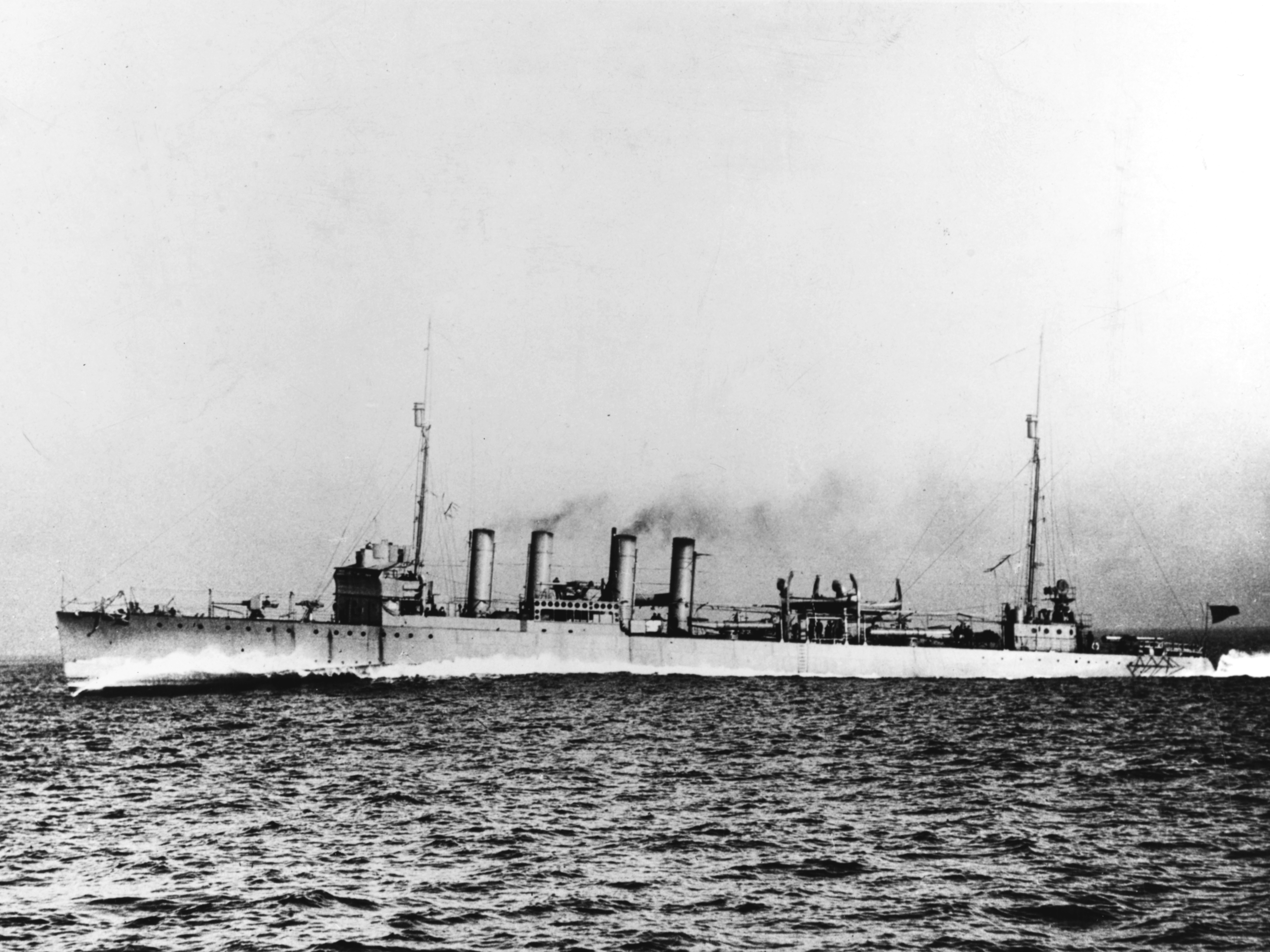
USS Clemson (DD-186)

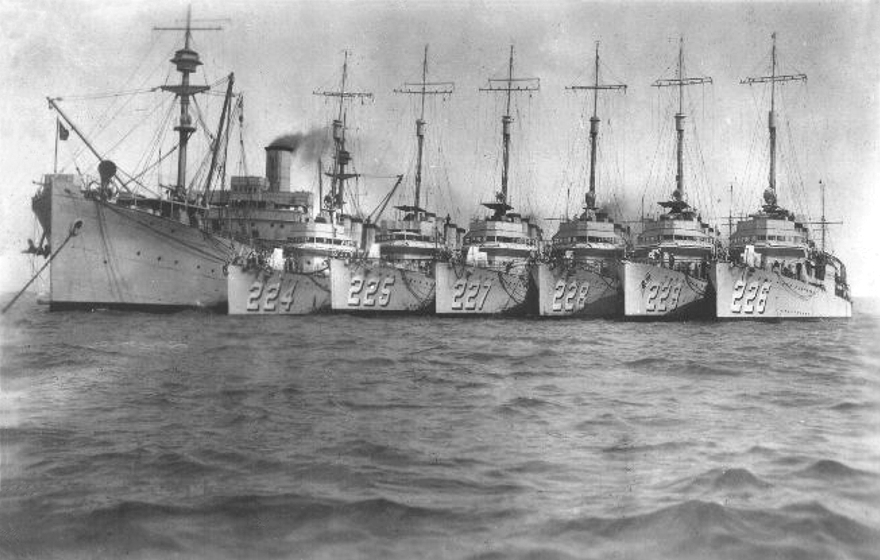
DD-224 through DD-229

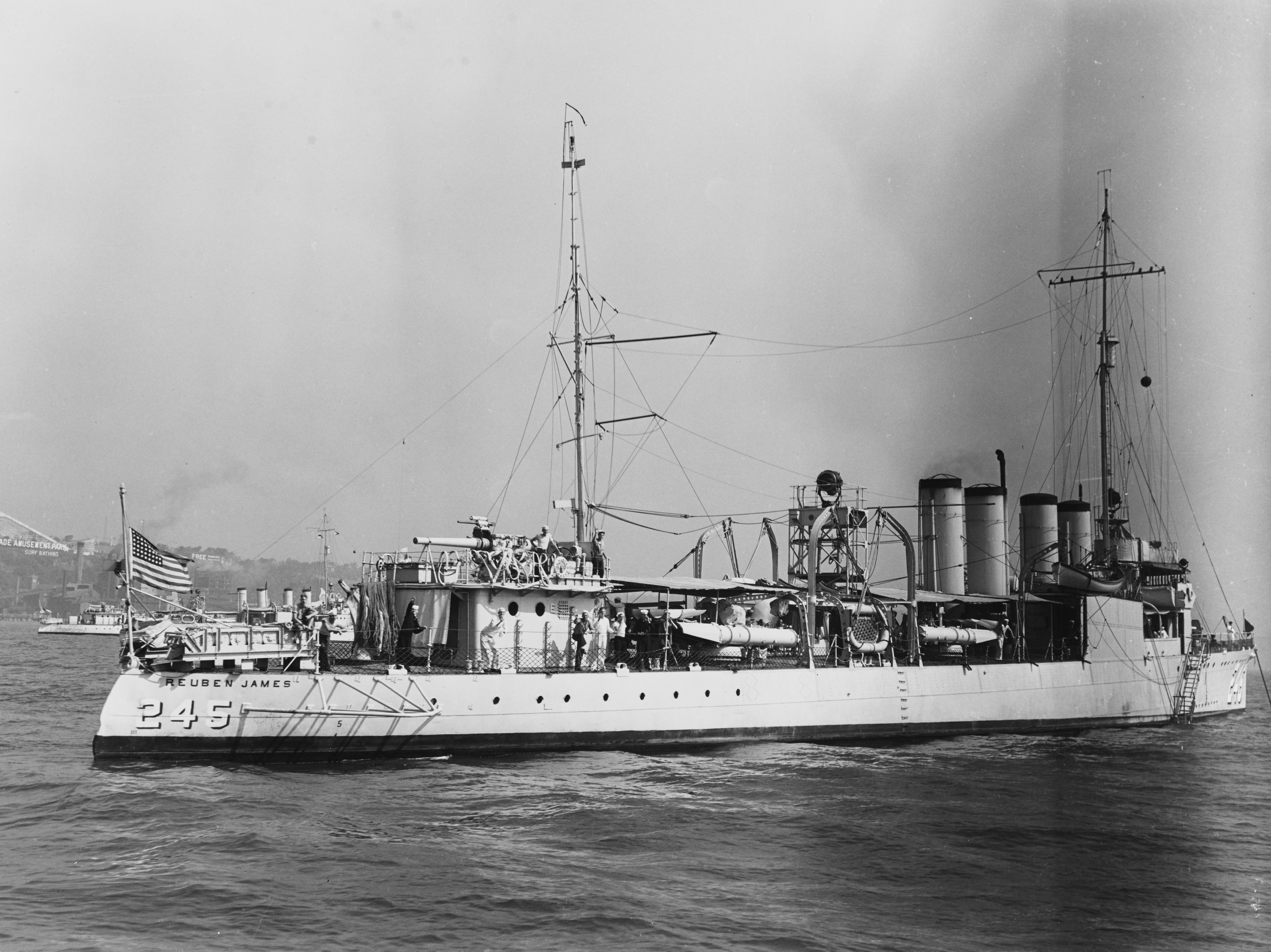
USS Reuben James (DD-245)

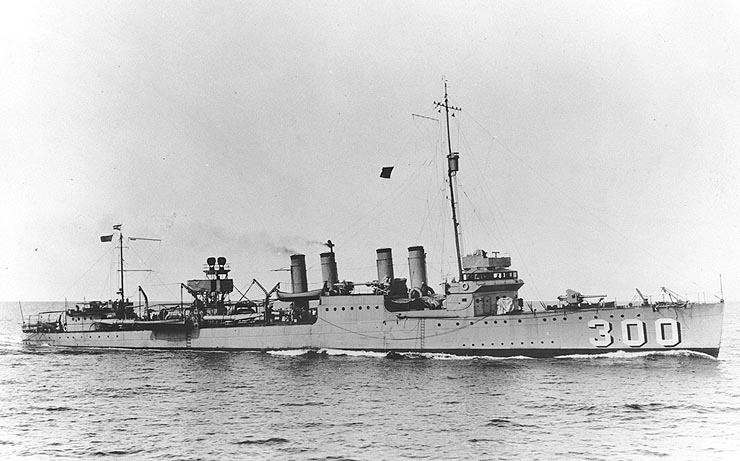
USS Farragut (DD-300)

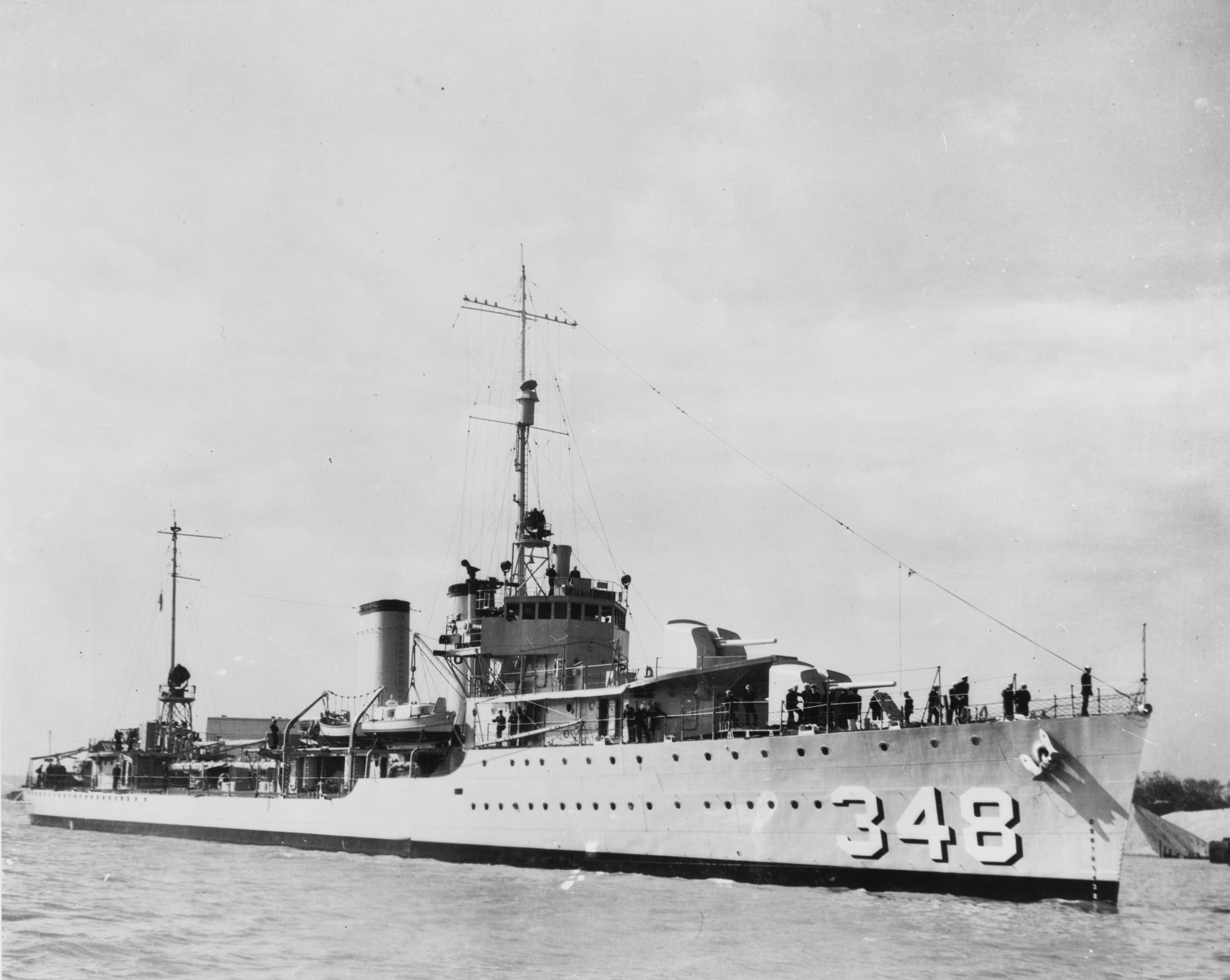
USS Farragut (DD-348)

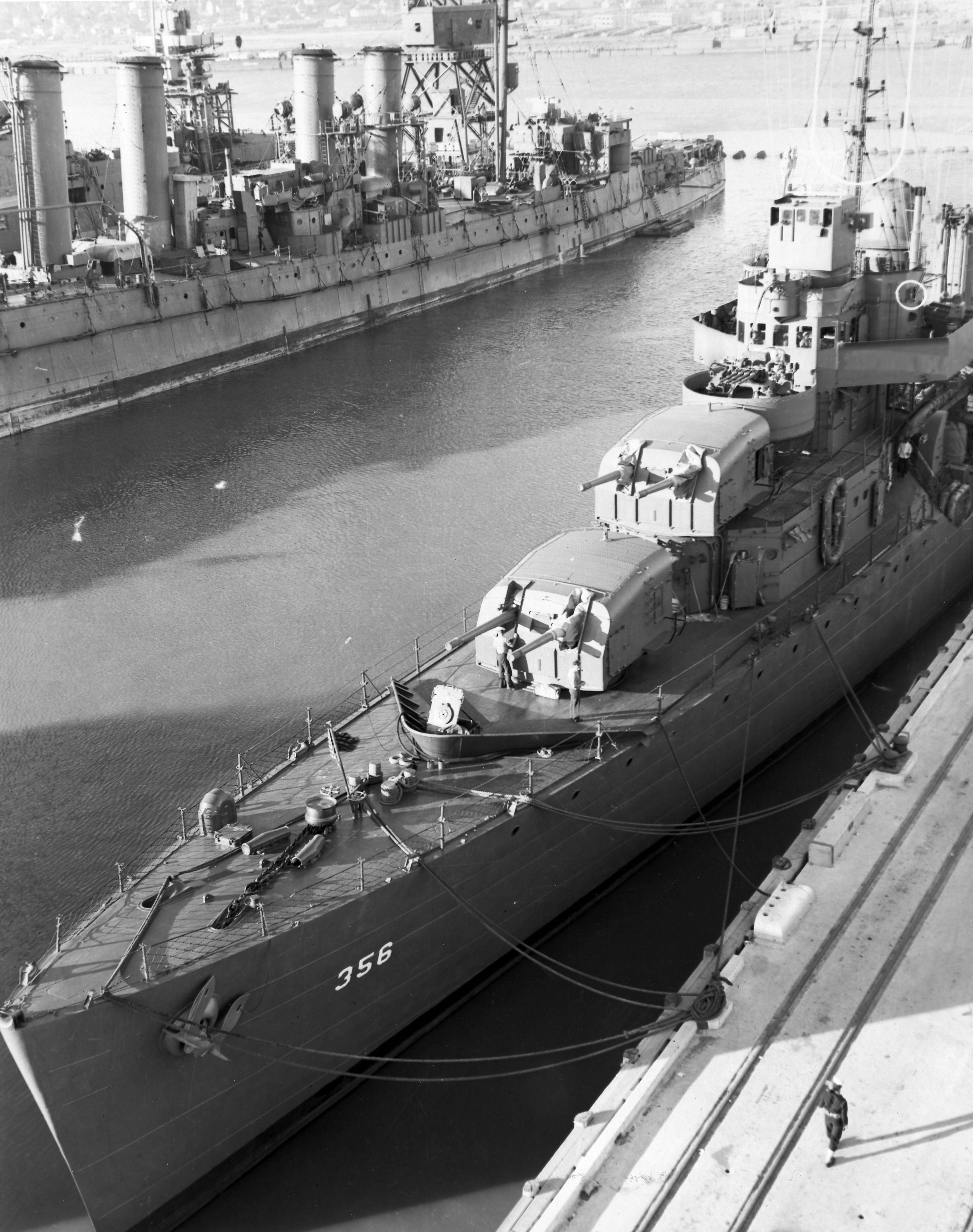
USS Porter (DD-356)

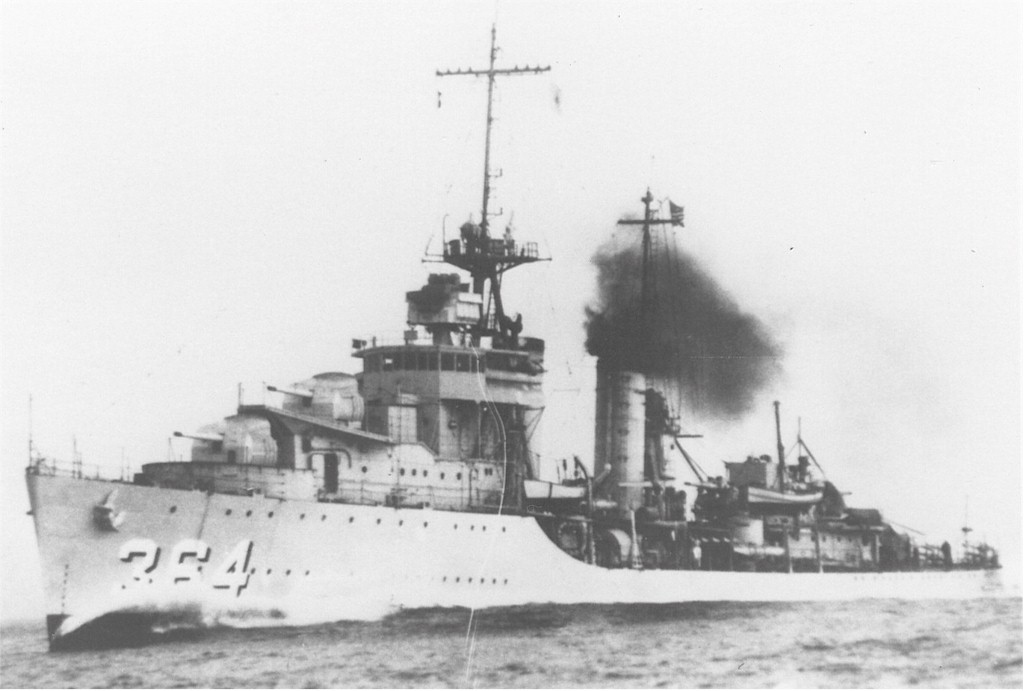
USS Mahan (DD-364)

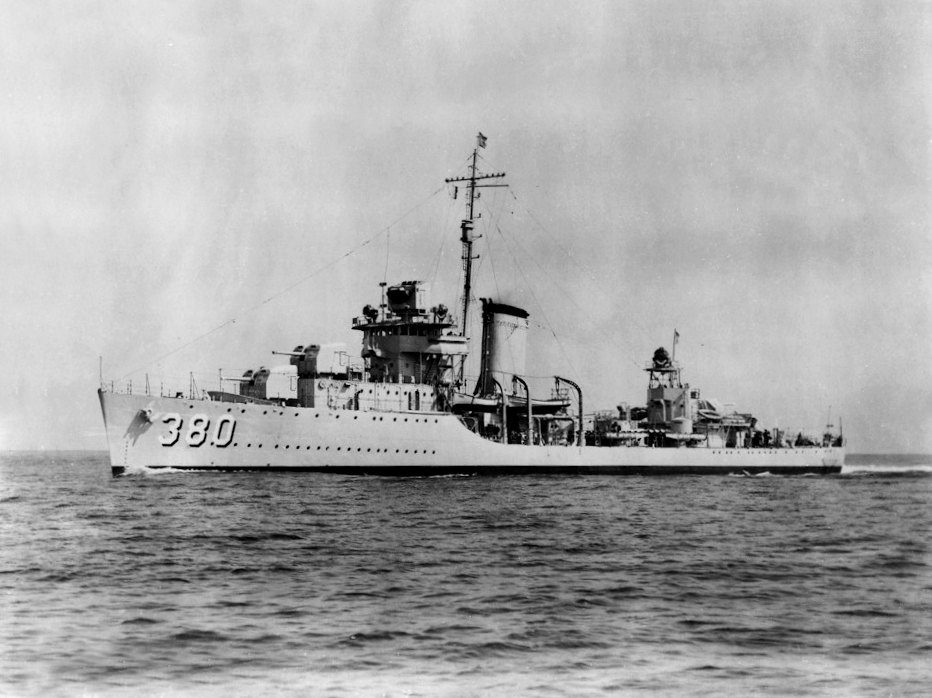
USS Gridley (DD-380)

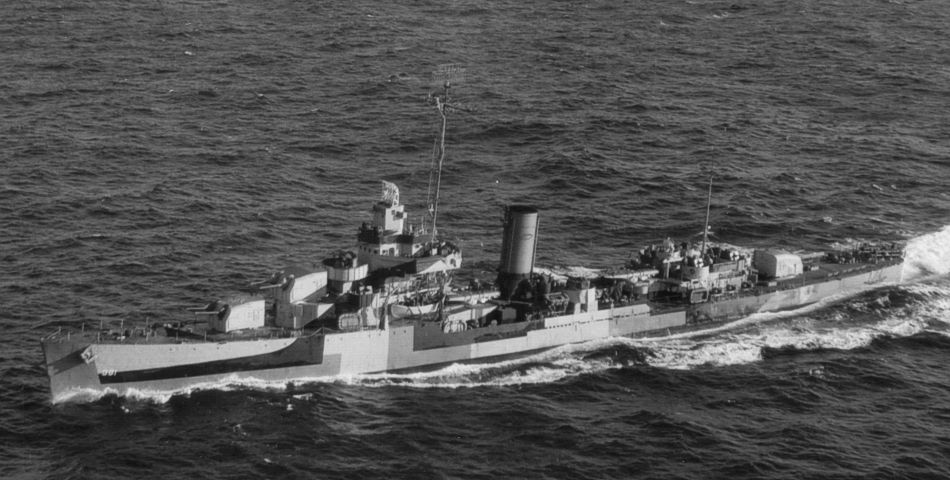
USS Somers (DD-381)

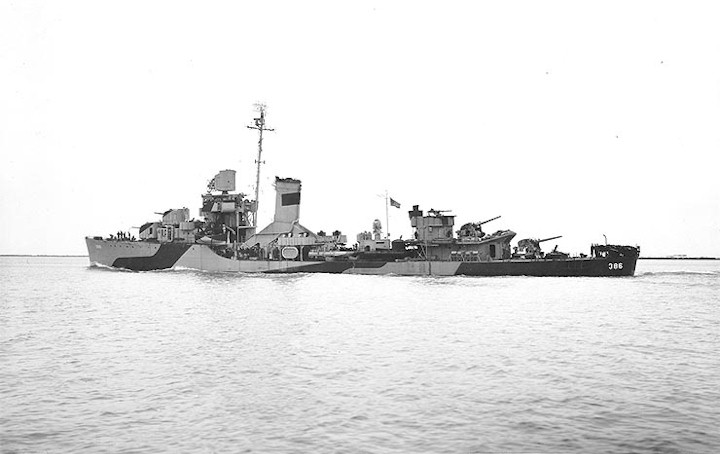
USS Bagley (DD-386)

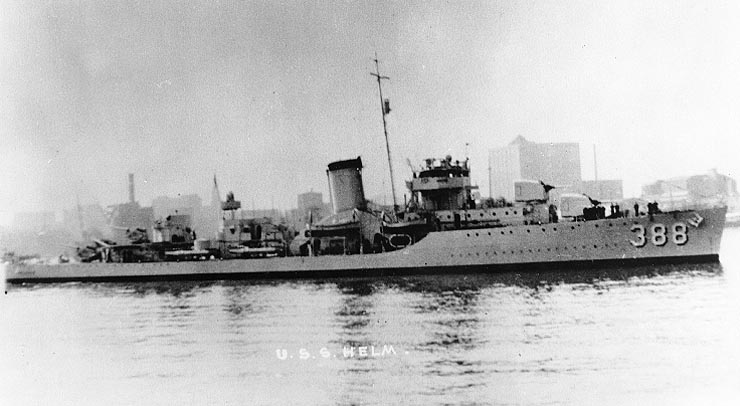
USS Helm (DD-388)

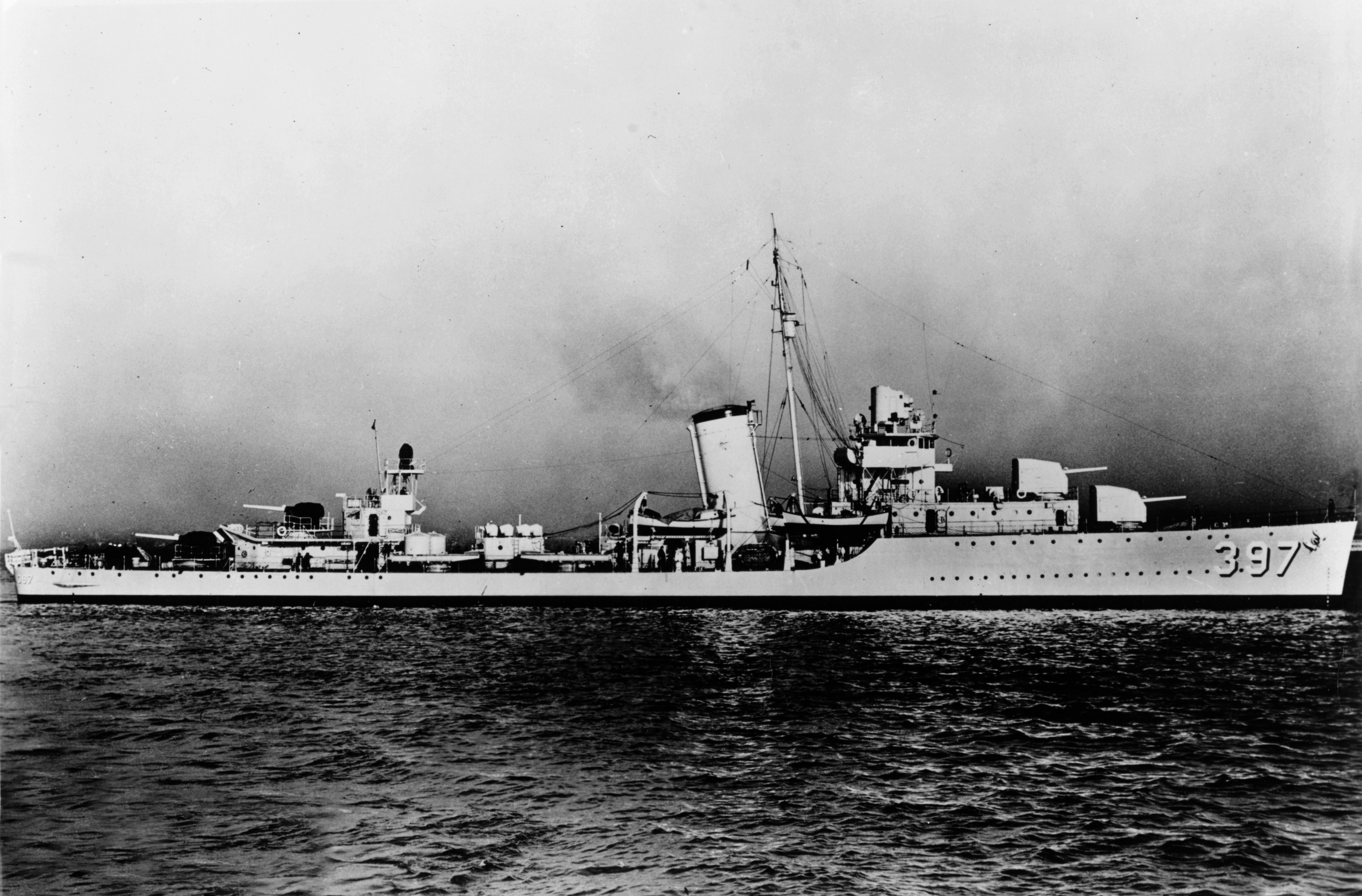
USS Benham (DD-397)

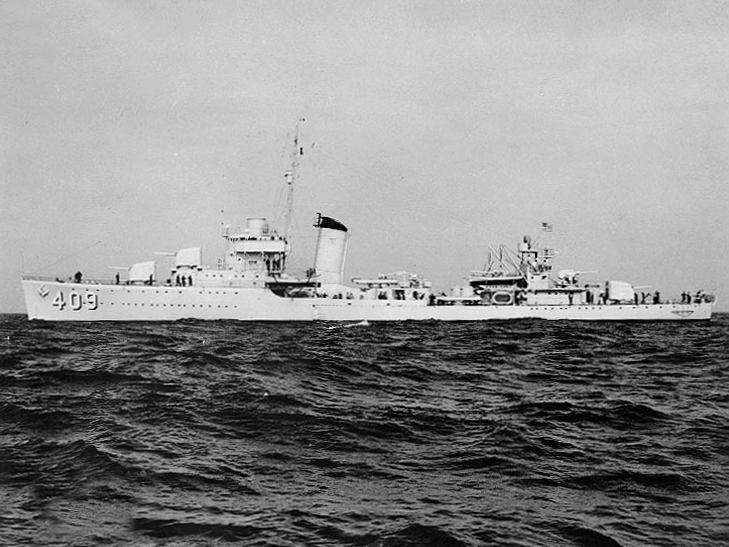
USS Sims (DD-409)

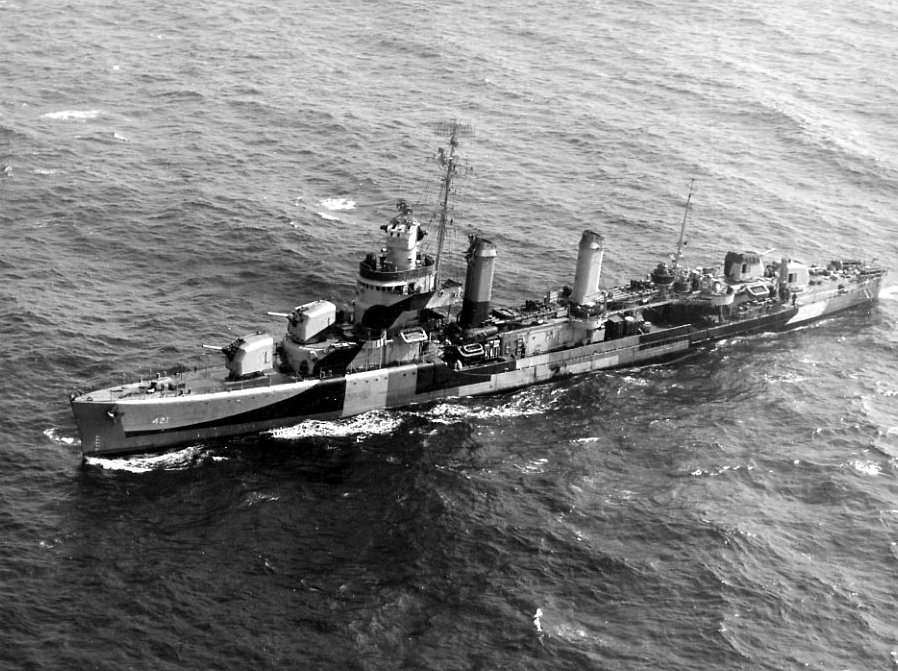
USS Benson (DD-421)

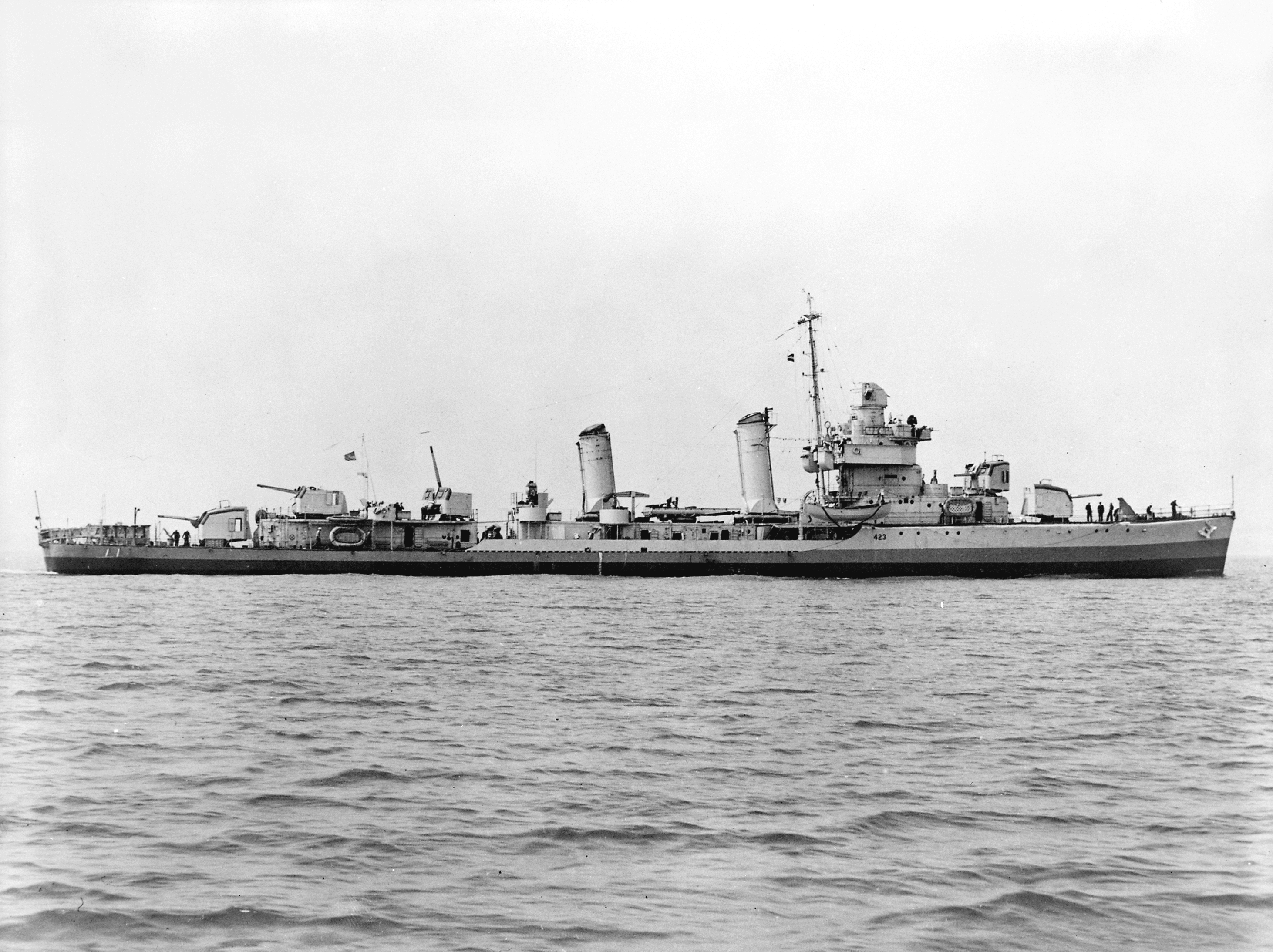
USS Gleaves (DD-423)

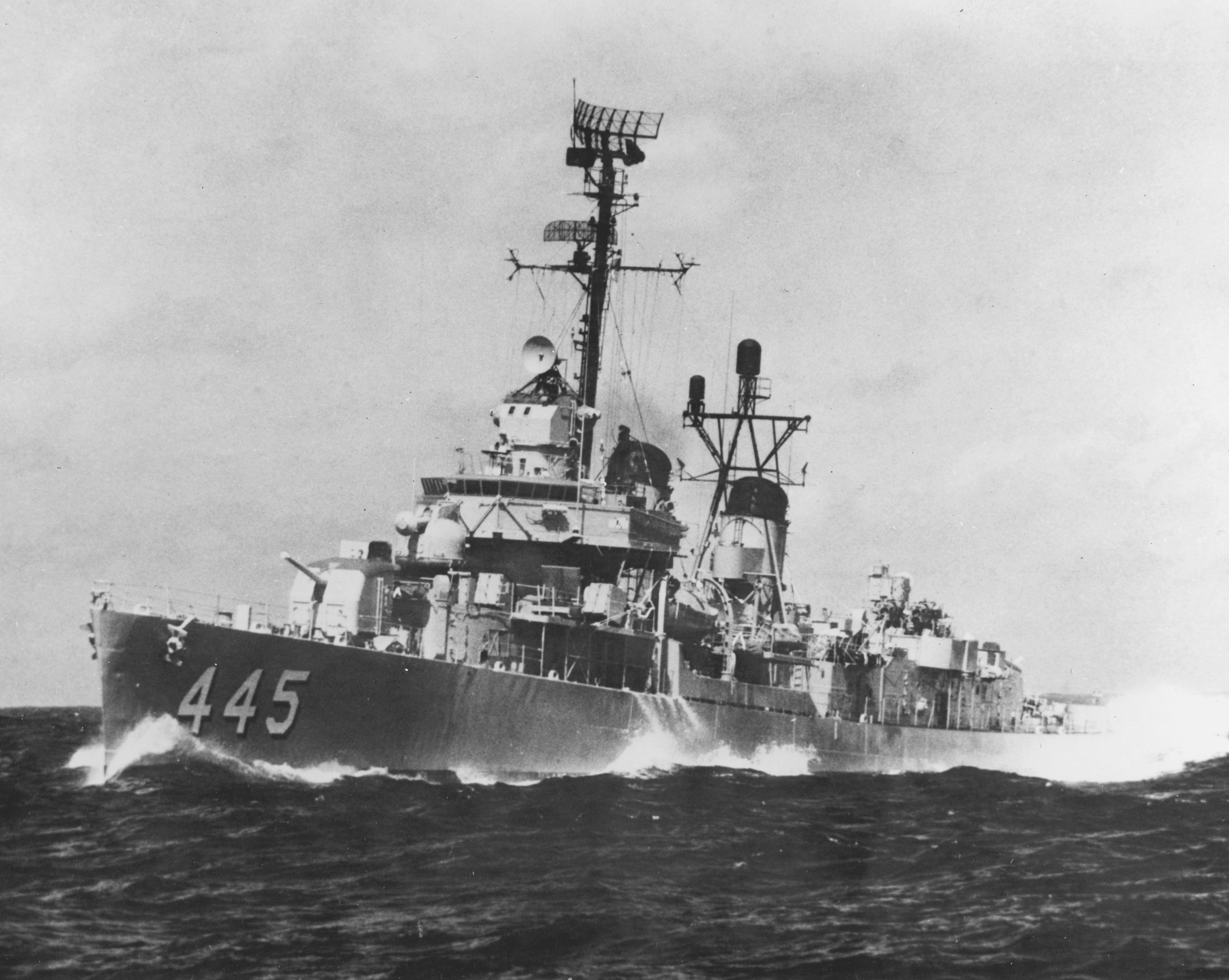
USS Fletcher (DD-445)

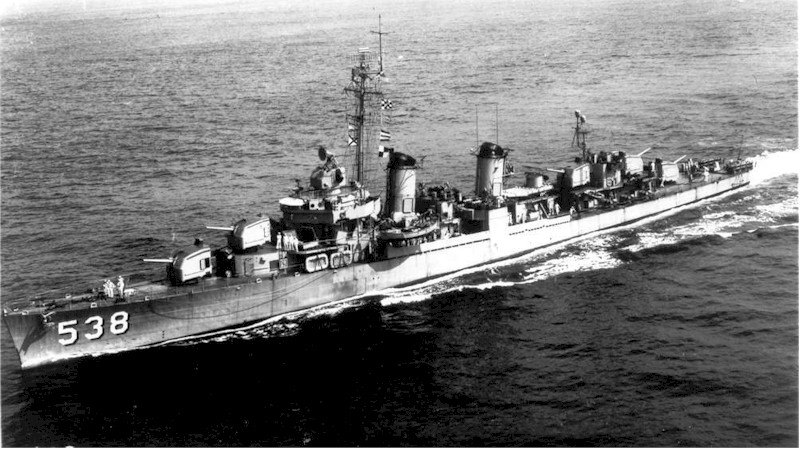
USS Stephen Potter (DD-538)

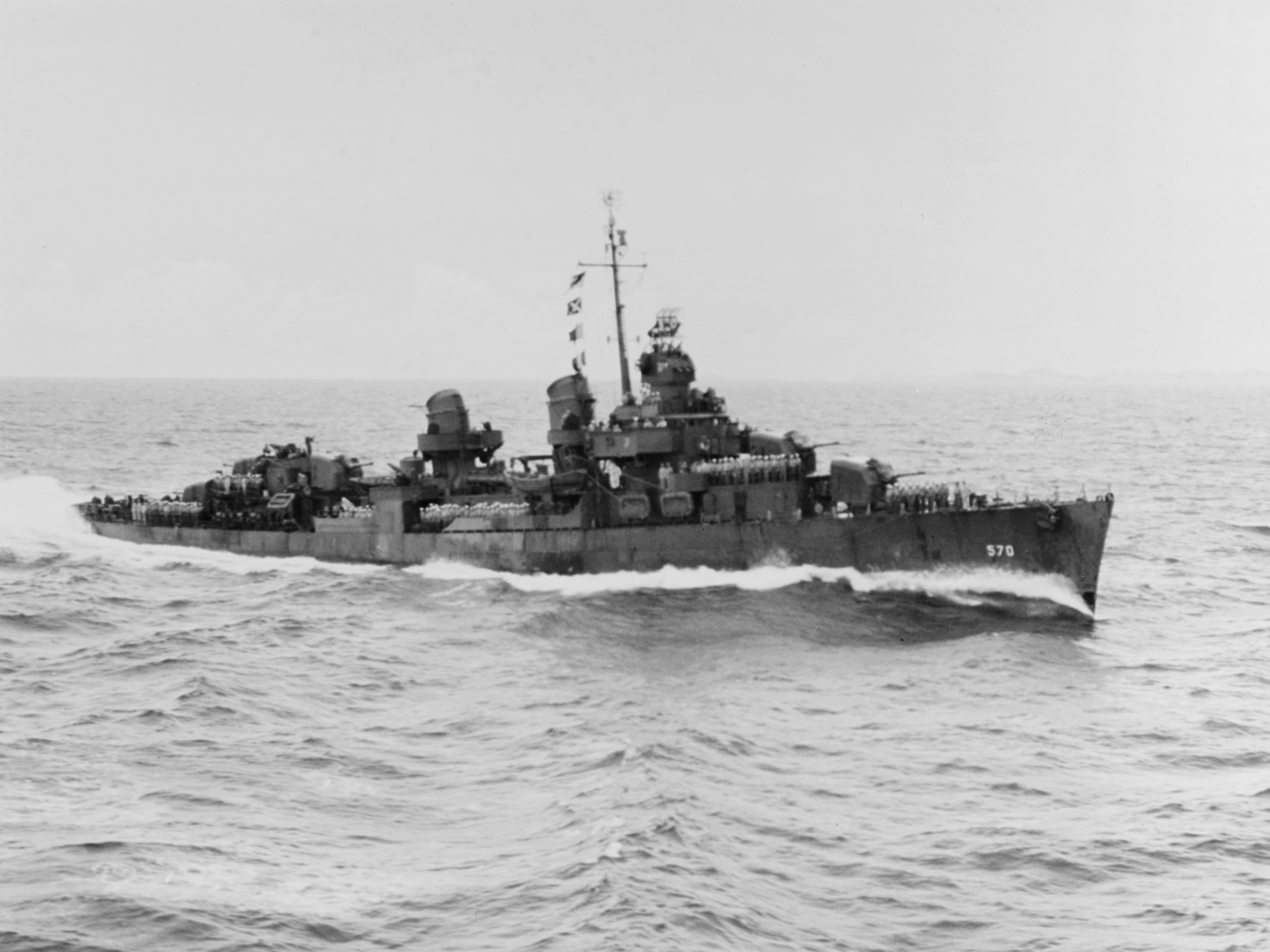
USS Charles Ausburne (DD-570)

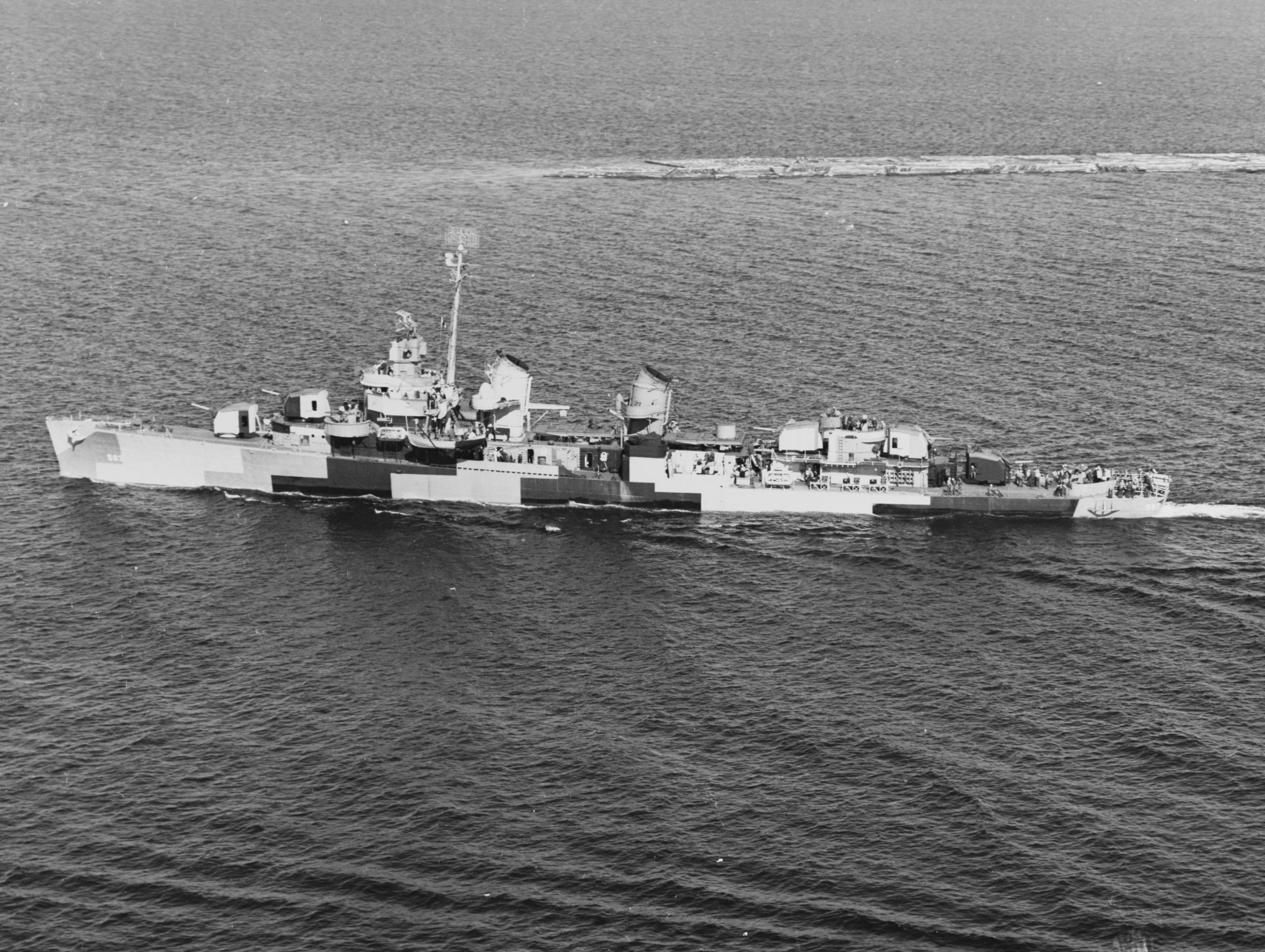
USS Killen (DD-593)

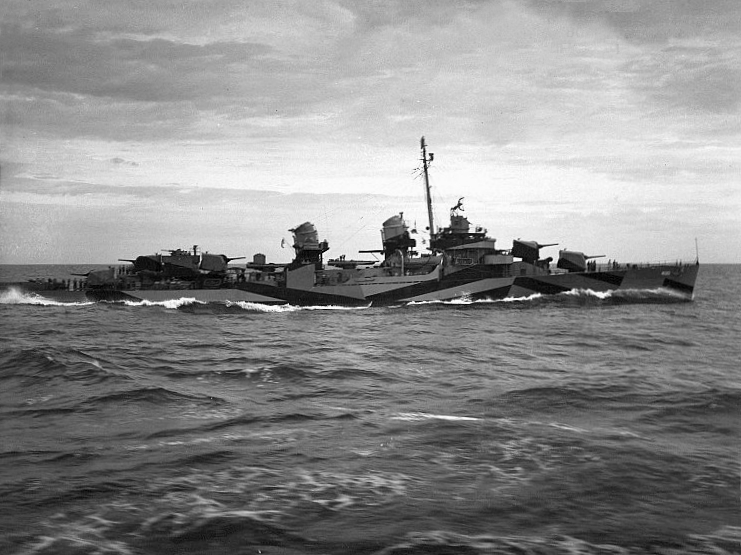
USS Braine (DD-630)

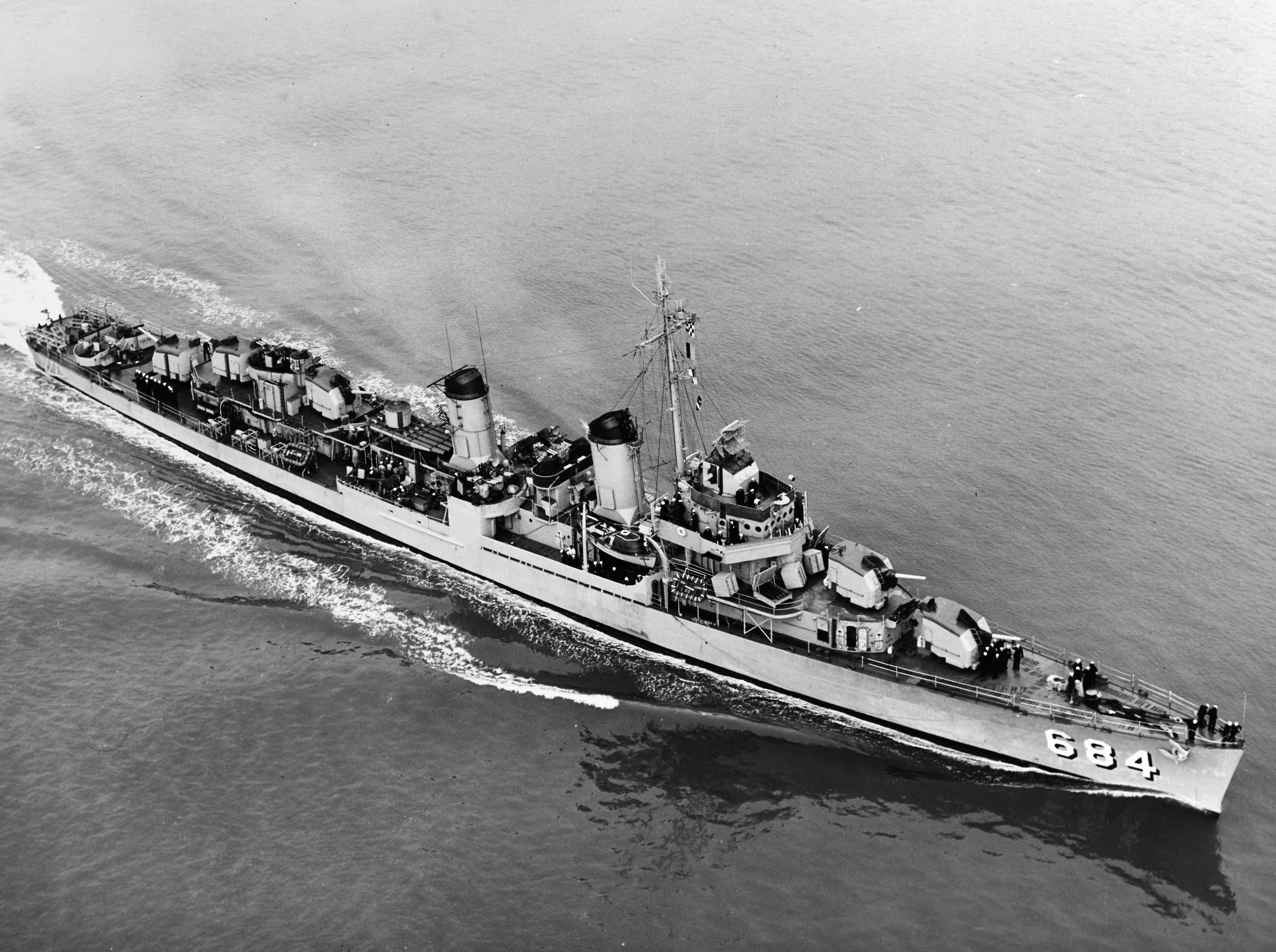
USS Wedderburn (DD-684)

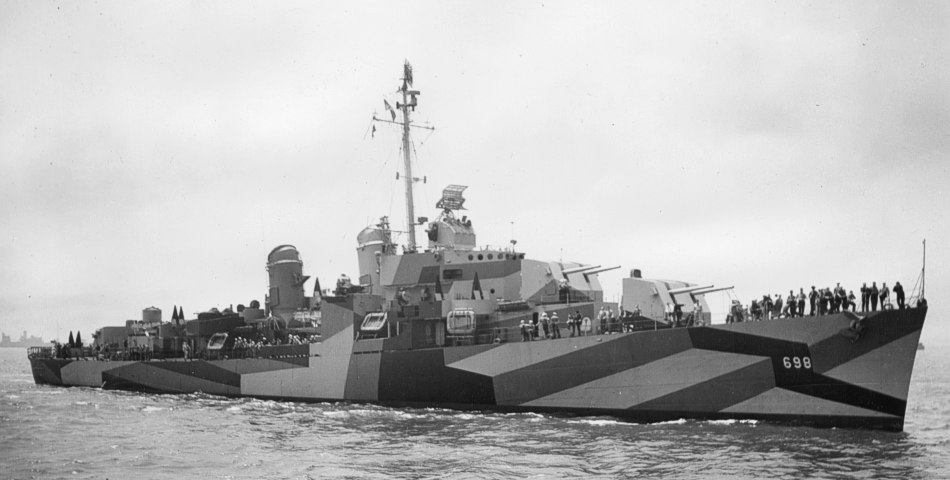
USS Ault (DD-698)

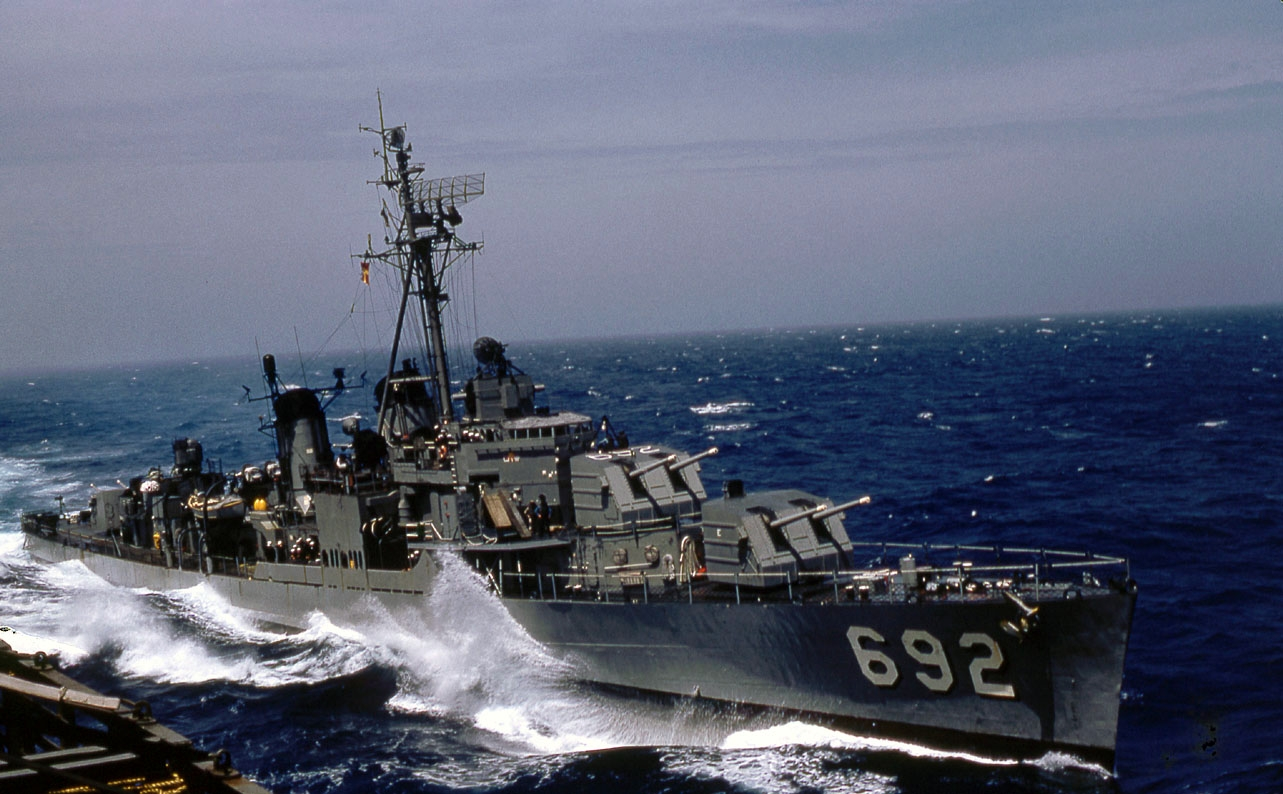
USS Allen M. Sumner (DD-692)

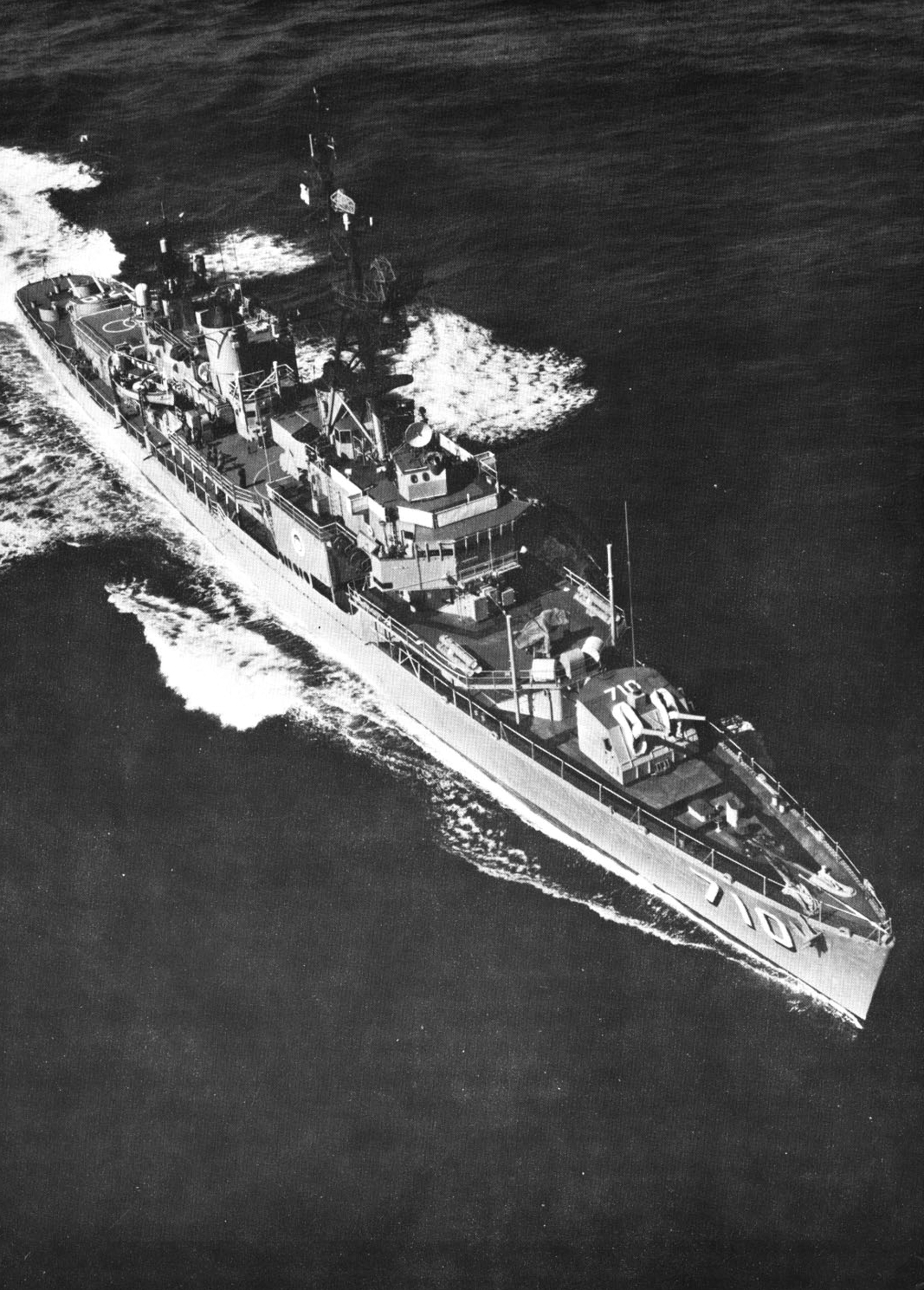
USS Gearing (DD-710)

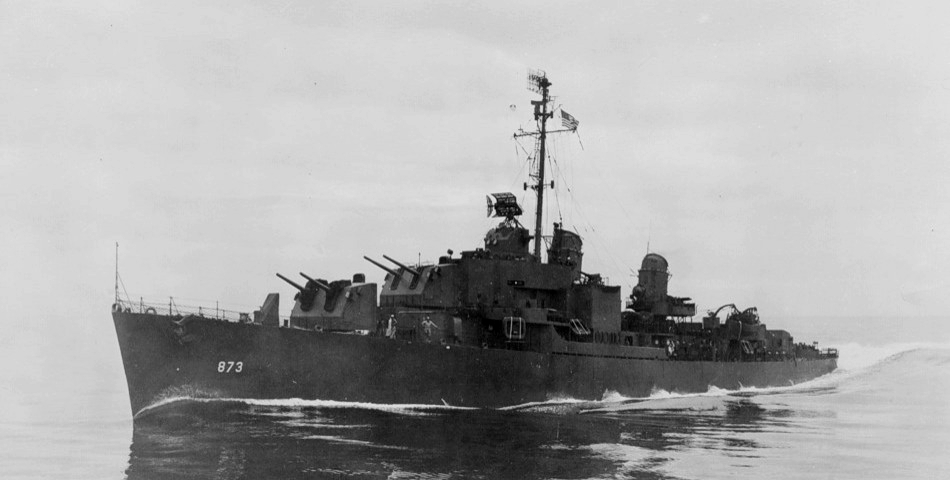
USS Hawkins (DD-873)

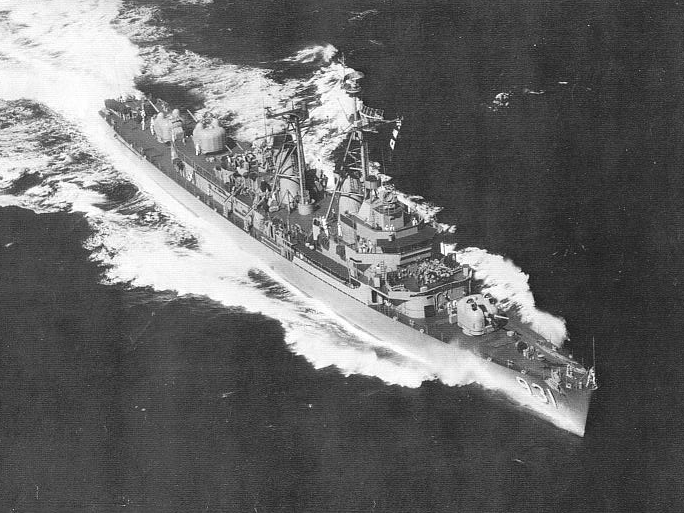
USS Forrest Sherman (DD-931)

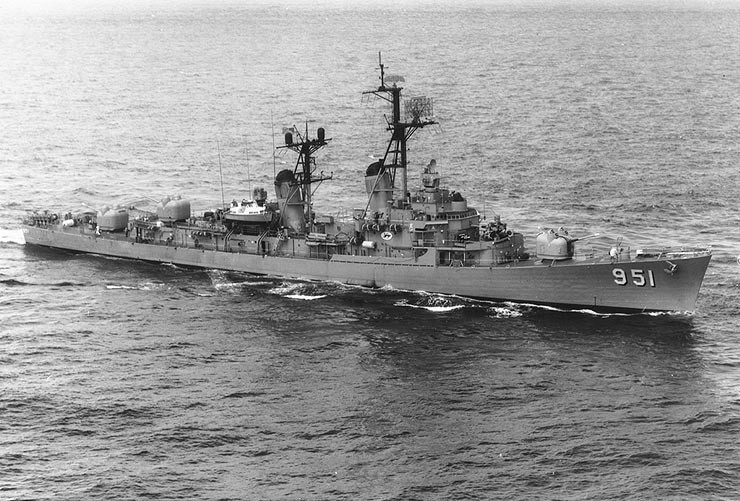
USS Turner Joy (DD-951)

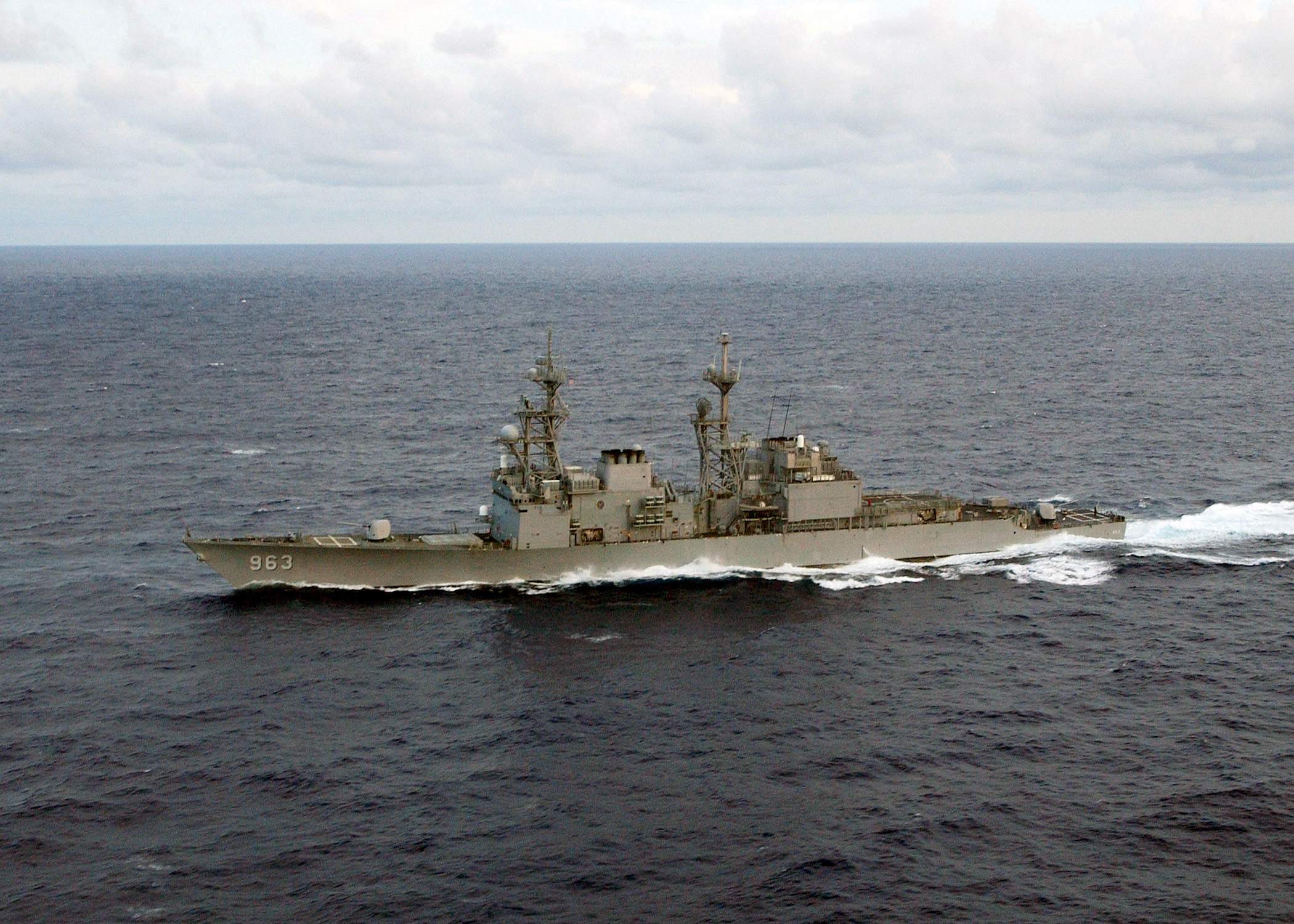
USS Spruance (DD-963)

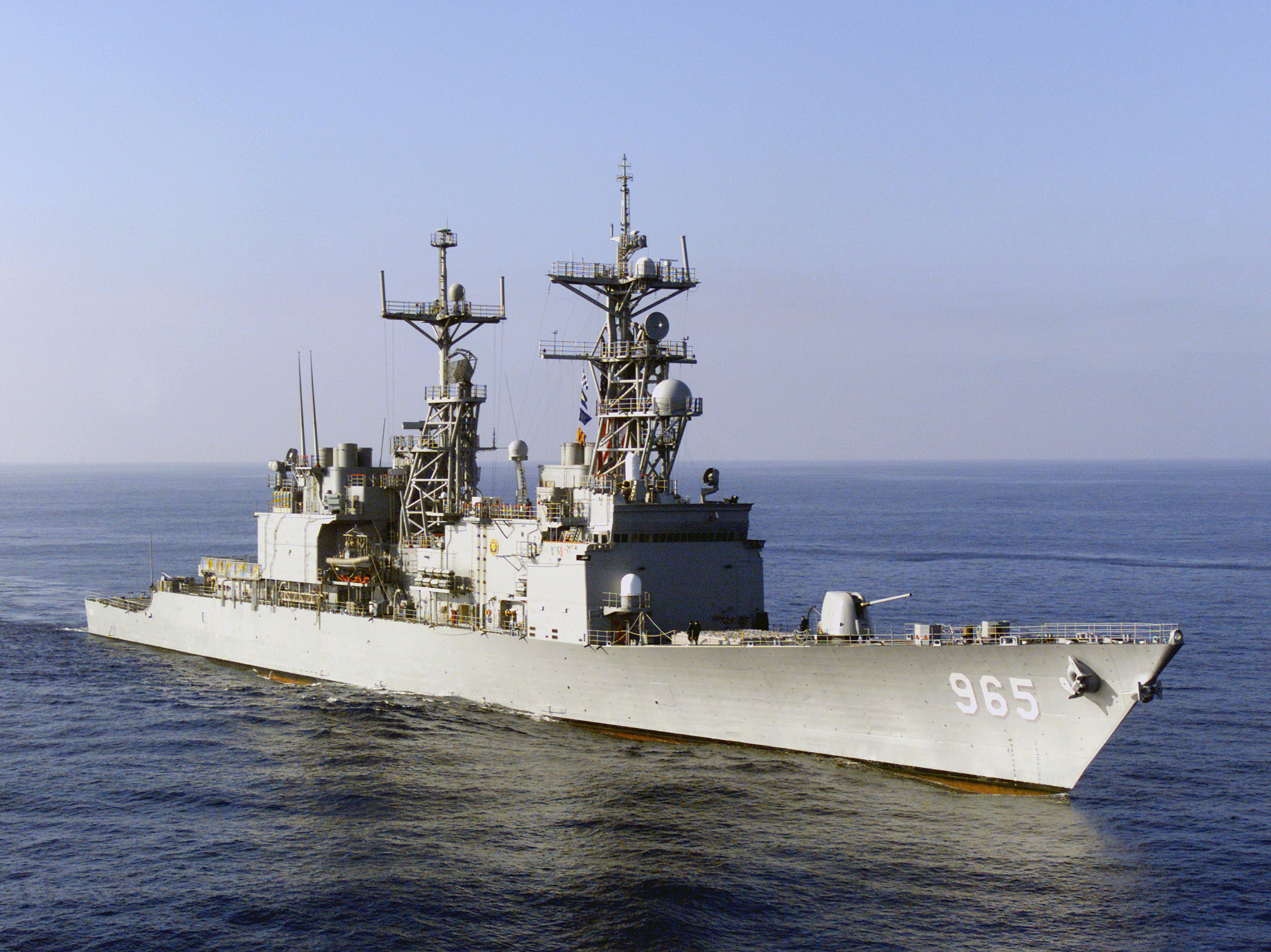
USS Kinkaid (DD-965)

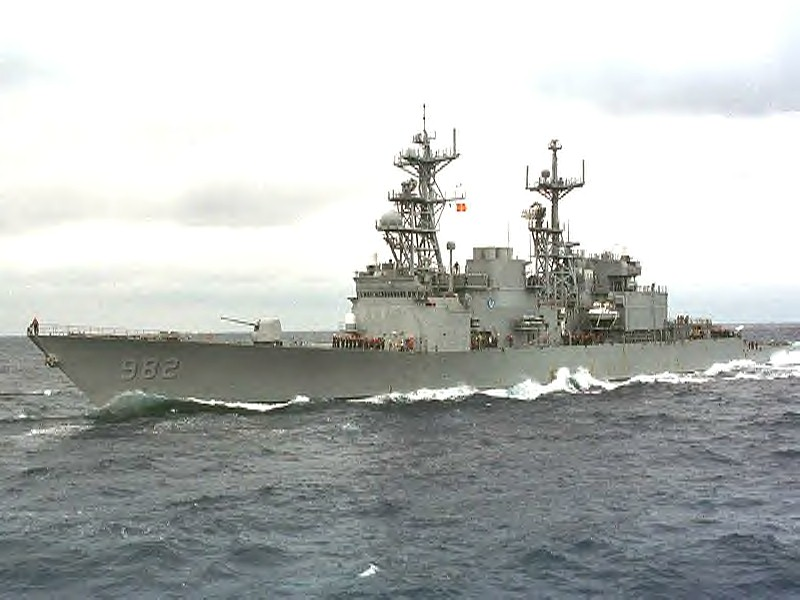
USS Nicholson (DD-982)

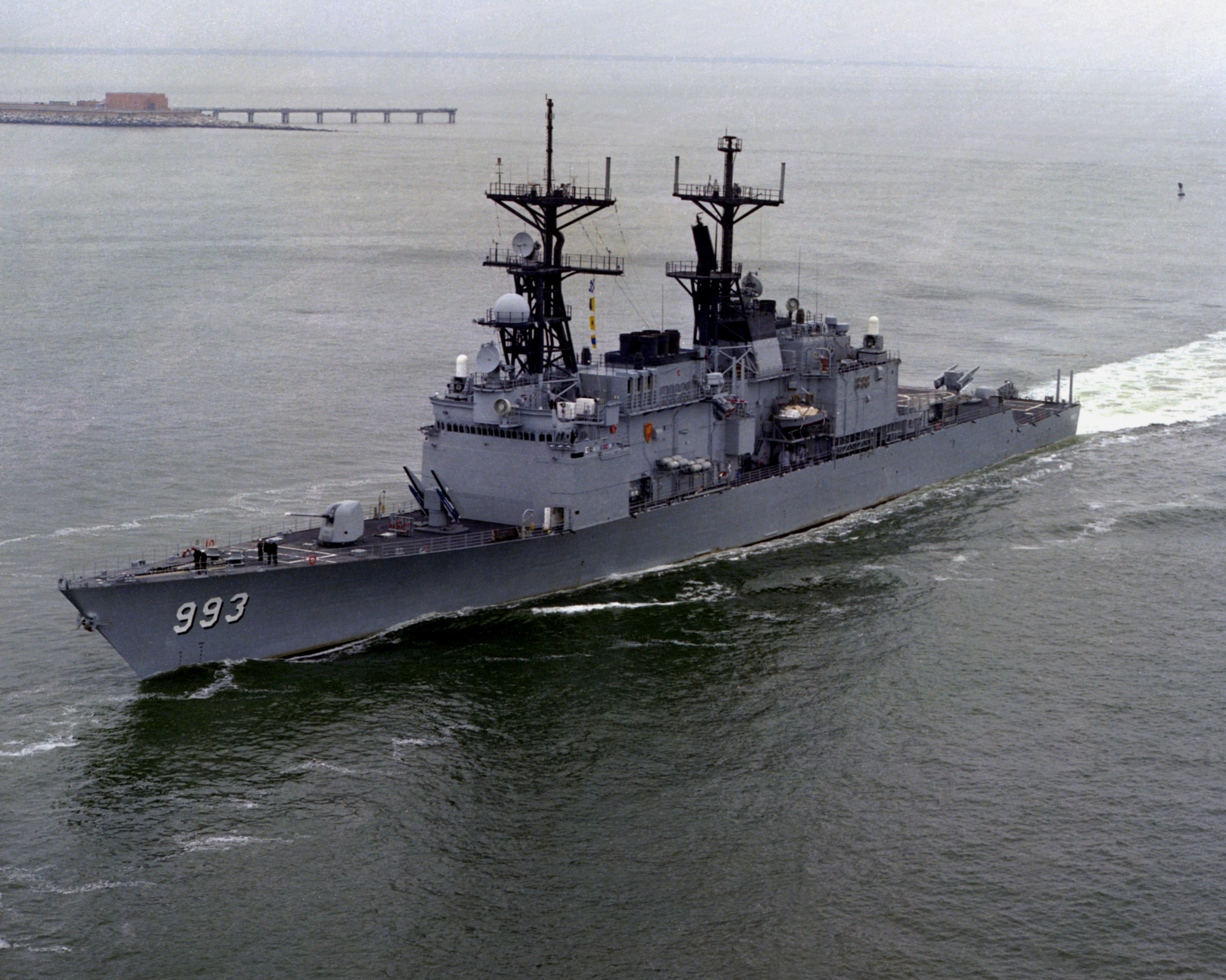
USS Kidd (DDG-993)

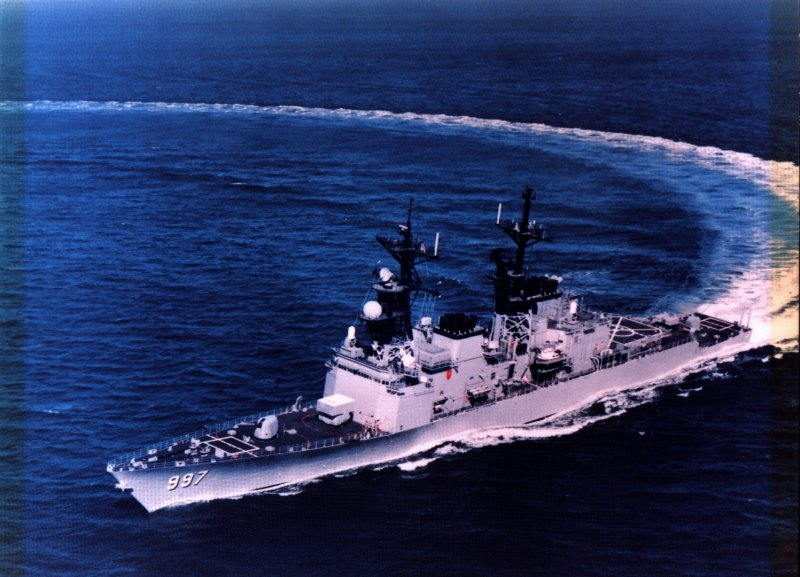
USS Hayler (DD-997)

List of United States Navy destroyers
Ship name	Hull number	Ship class	Notes	Refs
Bainbridge	DD-1	Bainbridge class		
Barry	DD-2	Bainbridge class		
Chauncey	DD-3	Bainbridge class	sunk in collision 19 November 1917, 21 killed	
Dale	DD-4	Bainbridge class		
Decatur	DD-5	Bainbridge class		
Hopkins	DD-6	Bainbridge class		
Hull	DD-7	Bainbridge class		
Lawrence	DD-8	Bainbridge class		
Macdonough	DD-9	Bainbridge class		
Paul Jones	DD-10	Bainbridge class		
Perry	DD-11	Bainbridge class		
Preble	DD-12	Bainbridge class		
Stewart	DD-13	Bainbridge class		
Truxtun	DD-14	Truxtun class		
Whipple	DD-15	Truxtun class		
Worden	DD-16	Truxtun class		
Smith	DD-17	Smith class		
Lamson	DD-18	Smith class		
Preston	DD-19	Smith class		
Flusser	DD-20	Smith class		
Reid	DD-21	Smith class		
Paulding	DD-22	Paulding class		
Drayton	DD-23	Paulding class		
Roe	DD-24	Paulding class		
Terry	DD-25	Paulding class		
Perkins	DD-26	Paulding class		
Sterett	DD-27	Paulding class		
McCall	DD-28	Paulding class		
Burrows	DD-29	Paulding class		
Warrington	DD-30	Paulding class		
Mayrant	DD-31	Paulding class		
Monaghan	DD-32	Paulding class		
Trippe	DD-33	Paulding class		
Walke	DD-34	Paulding class		
Ammen	DD-35	Paulding class		
Patterson	DD-36	Paulding class		
Fanning	DD-37	Paulding class		
Jarvis	DD-38	Paulding class		
Henley	DD-39	Paulding class		
Beale	DD-40	Paulding class		
Jouett	DD-41	Paulding class		
Jenkins	DD-42	Paulding class		
Cassin	DD-43	Cassin class		
Cummings	DD-44	Cassin class		
Downes	DD-45	Cassin class		
Duncan	DD-46	Cassin class		
Aylwin	DD-47	Aylwin class		
Parker	DD-48	Aylwin class		
Benham	DD-49	Aylwin class		
Balch	DD-50	Aylwin class		
O'Brien	DD-51	O'Brien class		
Nicholson	DD-52	O'Brien class		
Winslow	DD-53	O'Brien class		
McDougal	DD-54	O'Brien class		
Cushing	DD-55	O'Brien class		
Ericsson	DD-56	O'Brien class		
Tucker	DD-57	Tucker class		
Conyngham	DD-58	Tucker class		
Porter	DD-59	Tucker class		
Wadsworth	DD-60	Tucker class		
Jacob Jones	DD-61	Tucker class	sunk by torpedo 6 December 1917, 66 killed	
Wainwright	DD-62	Tucker class		
Sampson	DD-63	Sampson class		
Rowan	DD-64	Sampson class		
Davis	DD-65	Sampson class		
Allen	DD-66	Sampson class		
Wilkes	DD-67	Sampson class		
Shaw	DD-68	Sampson class		
Caldwell	DD-69	Caldwell class		
Craven	DD-70	Caldwell class	to Britain September 1940	
Gwin	DD-71	Caldwell class		
Conner	DD-72	Caldwell class	to Britain September 1940	
Stockton	DD-73	Caldwell class	to Britain September 1940	
Manley	DD-74	Caldwell class	later AG-28, APD-1	
Wickes	DD-75	Wickes class	to Britain September 1940	
Philip	DD-76	Wickes class	to Britain September 1940	
Woolsey	DD-77	Wickes class	sunk in collision 21 February 1921, 16 killed	
Evans	DD-78	Wickes class	to Britain September 1940	
Little	DD-79	Wickes class	later APD-4, sunk by naval gunfire 5 September 1942, 65 killed	
Kimberly	DD-80	Wickes class		
Sigourney	DD-81	Wickes class	to Britain September 1940	
Gregory	DD-82	Wickes class	later APD-3, sunk by naval gunfire 5 September 1942, 24 killed	
Stringham	DD-83	Wickes class	later APD-6	
Dyer	DD-84	Wickes class		
Colhoun	DD-85	Wickes class	later APD-2, sunk in air attack 30 August 1942, 51 killed	
Stevens	DD-86	Wickes class		
McKee	DD-87	Wickes class		
Robinson	DD-88	Wickes class	to Britain September 1940	
Ringgold	DD-89	Wickes class	to Britain September 1940	
McKean	DD-90	Wickes class	later APD-5, sunk in air attack 17 November 1943, 116 killed	
Harding	DD-91	Wickes class		
Gridley	DD-92	Wickes class		
Fairfax	DD-93	Wickes class	to Britain September 1940	
Taylor	DD-94	Wickes class		
Bell	DD-95	Wickes class		
Stribling	DD-96	Wickes class	later DM-1	
Murray	DD-97	Wickes class	later DM-2	
Israel	DD-98	Wickes class	later DM-3	
Luce	DD-99	Wickes class	later DM-4	
Maury	DD-100	Wickes class	later DM-5	
Lansdale	DD-101	Wickes class	later DM-6	
Mahan	DD-102	Wickes class	later DM-7	
Schley	DD-103	Wickes class	later APD-14	
Champlin	DD-104	Wickes class		
Mugford	DD-105	Wickes class		
Chew	DD-106	Wickes class		
Hazelwood	DD-107	Wickes class		
Williams	DD-108	Wickes class	to Canada September 1940	
Crane	DD-109	Wickes class		
Hart	DD-110	Wickes class	later DM-8	
Ingraham	DD-111	Wickes class	later DM-9	
Ludlow	DD-112	Wickes class	later DM-10	
Rathburne	DD-113	Wickes class	later APD-25	
Talbot	DD-114	Wickes class	later APD-7	
Waters	DD-115	Wickes class	later APD-8	
Dent	DD-116	Wickes class	later APD-9	
Dorsey	DD-117	Wickes class	later DMS-1	
Lea	DD-118	Wickes class		
Lamberton	DD-119	Wickes class	later DMS-2	
Radford	DD-120	Wickes class		
Montgomery	DD-121	Wickes class	later DM-17, mined 17 October 1944, 4 killed, scrapped	
Breese	DD-122	Wickes class	later DM-18	
Gamble	DD-123	Wickes class	later DM-15, bombed 18 February 1945, 6 killed or missing, later scuttled	
Ramsay	DD-124	Wickes class	later DM-16, AG-98	
Tattnall	DD-125	Wickes class	later APD-19	
Badger	DD-126	Wickes class		
Twiggs	DD-127	Wickes class	to Britain September 1940	
Babbitt	DD-128	Wickes class	later AG-102	
DeLong	DD-129	Wickes class		
Jacob Jones	DD-130	Wickes class		
Buchanan	DD-131	Wickes class	to Britain September 1940, intentionally destroyed in the St. Nazaire Raid on 28 March 1942	
Aaron Ward	DD-132	Wickes class	to Britain September 1940	
Hale	DD-133	Wickes class	to Britain September 1940	
Crowninshield	DD-134	Wickes class	to Britain September 1940	
Tillman	DD-135	Wickes class	to Britain September 1940	
Boggs	DD-136	Wickes class	later IX-36, DMS-3, AG-19	
Kilty	DD-137	Wickes class	later APD-15	
Kennison	DD-138	Wickes class	later AG-83	
Ward	DD-139	Wickes class	later APD-16, sunk by Kamikaze 7 December 1944	
Claxton	DD-140	Wickes class	to Britain September 1940	
Hamilton	DD-141	Wickes class	later DMS-18, AG-111	
Tarbell	DD-142	Wickes class		
Yarnall	DD-143	Wickes class	to Britain September 1940	
Upshur	DD-144	Wickes class	later AG-103	
Greer	DD-145	Wickes class		
Elliot	DD-146	Wickes class	later DMS-4, AG-104	
Roper	DD-147	Wickes class	later APD-20	
Breckinridge	DD-148	Wickes class	later AG-112	
Barney	DD-149	Wickes class	later AG-113	
Blakeley	DD-150	Wickes class		
Biddle	DD-151	Wickes class	later AG-114	
Du Pont	DD-152	Wickes class	later AG-80	
Bernadou	DD-153	Wickes class		
Ellis	DD-154	Wickes class	later AG-115	
Cole	DD-155	Wickes class	later AG-116	
J. Fred Talbott	DD-156	Wickes class	later AG-81	
Dickerson	DD-157	Wickes class	later APD-21, scuttled after Kamikaze attack 4 April 1945, 54 killed	
Leary	DD-158	Wickes class		
Schenck	DD-159	Wickes class	later AG-82	
Herbert	DD-160	Wickes class	later APD-22	
Palmer	DD-161	Wickes class	later DMS-5, sunk by Kamikaze Lingayen Gulf 7 January 1945, 28 killed and missing	
Thatcher	DD-162	Wickes class	to Canada September 1940	
Walker	DD-163	Wickes class	later IX-44	
Crosby	DD-164	Wickes class	later APD-17	
Meredith	DD-165	Wickes class		
Bush	DD-166	Wickes class		
Cowell	DD-167	Wickes class	to Britain September 1940	
Maddox	DD-168	Wickes class	to Britain September 1940	
Foote	DD-169	Wickes class	to Britain September 1940	
Kalk	DD-170	Wickes class	to Canada September 1940	
Burns	DD-171	Wickes class	later DM-11	
Anthony	DD-172	Wickes class	later DM-12	
Sproston	DD-173	Wickes class	later DM-13	
Rizal	DD-174	Wickes class	later DM-14	
MacKenzie	DD-175	Wickes class	to Canada September 1940	
Renshaw	DD-176	Wickes class		
O'Bannon	DD-177	Wickes class		
Hogan	DD-178	Wickes class	later DMS-6, AG-105	
Howard	DD-179	Wickes class	later DMS-7, AG-106	
Stansbury	DD-180	Wickes class	later DMS-8, AG-107	
Hopewell	DD-181	Wickes class	to Britain September 1940, sunk by torpedo 19 August 1941, 88 killed	
Thomas	DD-182	Wickes class	to Britain September 1940	
Haraden	DD-183	Wickes class	to Britain September 1940	
Abbot	DD-184	Wickes class	to Britain September 1940	
Bagley	DD-185	Wickes class	to Britain September 1940	
Clemson	DD-186	Clemson class	later AVP-17, AVD-4, APD-31	
Dahlgren	DD-187	Clemson class		
Goldsborough	DD-188	Clemson class	later AVP-18, AVD-5, APD-32	
Semmes	DD-189	Clemson class		
Satterlee	DD-190	Clemson class	to Britain September 1940, sunk by torpedo 31 January 1942, 138 killed	
Mason	DD-191	Clemson class	to Britain September 1940, sunk by torpedo 18 October 1941, 44 killed	
Graham	DD-192	Clemson class		
Abel P. Upshur	DD-193	Clemson class	to Britain September 1940	
Hunt	DD-194	Clemson class	to Britain September 1940	
Welborn C. Wood	DD-195	Clemson class	to Britain September 1940	
George E. Badger	DD-196	Clemson class	later AVP-16, AVD-3, APD-33	
Branch	DD-197	Clemson class	to Britain September 1940, sunk by torpedo 11 April 1943, 139 killed	
Herndon	DD-198	Clemson class	to Britain September 1940	
Dallas	DD-199	Clemson class		
—N/a	DD-200 – DD-205	Clemson class	cancelled 3 February 1919	
Chandler	DD-206	Clemson class	later DMS-9, AG-108	
Southard	DD-207	Clemson class	later DMS-10, wrecked by Typhoon Louise Okinawa October 1945	
Hovey	DD-208	Clemson class	later DMS-11, sunk by Kamikaze Lingayen Gulf 7 January 1945, 48 killed	
Long	DD-209	Clemson class	later DMS-12, sunk by Kamikaze Lingayen Gulf 6 January 1945	
Broome	DD-210	Clemson class	later AG-96	
Alden	DD-211	Clemson class		
Smith Thompson	DD-212	Clemson class		
Barker	DD-213	Clemson class		
Tracy	DD-214	Clemson class	later DM-19	
Borie	DD-215	Clemson class		
John D. Edwards	DD-216	Clemson class		
Whipple	DD-217	Clemson class	later AG-117	
Parrott	DD-218	Clemson class		
Edsall	DD-219	Clemson class		
MacLeish	DD-220	Clemson class	later AG-87	
Simpson	DD-221	Clemson class	later AG-97	
Bulmer	DD-222	Clemson class	later AG-86	
McCormick	DD-223	Clemson class	later AG-118	
Stewart	DD-224	Clemson class		
Pope	DD-225	Clemson class		
Peary	DD-226	Clemson class	later DMS-17 sunk by mines 13 September 1944	
Pillsbury	DD-227	Clemson class		
John D. Ford	DD-228	Clemson class	later AG-119	
Truxtun	DD-229	Clemson class		
Paul Jones	DD-230	Clemson class	later AG-120	
Hatfield	DD-231	Clemson class	later AG-84	
Brooks	DD-232	Clemson class	later APD-10	
Gilmer	DD-233	Clemson class	later APD-11	
Fox	DD-234	Clemson class	later AG-85	
Kane	DD-235	Clemson class	later APD-18	
Humphreys	DD-236	Clemson class	later APD-12	
McFarland	DD-237	Clemson class	later AVD-14, conversion to APD-26 canceled	
James K. Paulding	DD-238	Clemson class		
Overton	DD-239	Clemson class	later APD-23	
Sturtevant	DD-240	Clemson class		
Childs	DD-241	Clemson class	later AVP-14, AVD-1	
King	DD-242	Clemson class		
Sands	DD-243	Clemson class	later APD-13	
Williamson	DD-244	Clemson class	later AVP-15, AVD-2, APD-27	
Reuben James	DD-245	Clemson class	sunk by torpedo 31 October 1941, 100 killed	
Bainbridge	DD-246	Clemson class		
Goff	DD-247	Clemson class		
Barry	DD-248	Clemson class	later APD-29, sunk by Kamikaze 21 June 1945	
Hopkins	DD-249	Clemson class	later DMS-13	
Lawrence	DD-250	Clemson class		
Belknap	DD-251	Clemson class	later AVD-8, APD-34, heavily damaged by Kamikaze 11 January 1945 (never repaired and decommissioned in August 1945), 38 killed	
McCook	DD-252	Clemson class	to Canada September 1940	
McCalla	DD-253	Clemson class	to Britain September 1940	
Rodgers	DD-254	Clemson class	to Britain September 1940	
Osmond Ingram	DD-255	Clemson class	later AVD-9, APD-35	
Bancroft	DD-256	Clemson class	to Canada September 1940	
Welles	DD-257	Clemson class	to Britain September 1940	
Aulick	DD-258	Clemson class	to Britain September 1940	
Turner	DD-259	Clemson class	later YW-56, IX-98	
Gillis	DD-260	Clemson class	later AVD-12	
Delphy	DD-261	Clemson class	wrecked 8 September 1923, 3 killed	
McDermut	DD-262	Clemson class		
Laub	DD-263	Clemson class	to Britain September 1940	
McLanahan	DD-264	Clemson class	to Britain September 1940	
Edwards	DD-265	Clemson class	to Britain September 1940	
Greene	DD-266	Clemson class	later AVD-13, APD-36, wrecked by Typhoon Louise Okinawa October 1945	
Ballard	DD-267	Clemson class	later AVD-10	
Shubrick	DD-268	Clemson class	to Britain September 1940	
Bailey	DD-269	Clemson class	to Britain September 1940	
Thornton	DD-270	Clemson class	later AVD-11	
Morris	DD-271	Clemson class		
Tingey	DD-272	Clemson class		
Swasey	DD-273	Clemson class	to Britain September 1940	
Meade	DD-274	Clemson class	to Britain September 1940	
Sinclair	DD-275	Clemson class	later IX-37	
McCawley	DD-276	Clemson class		
Moody	DD-277	Clemson class		
Henshaw	DD-278	Clemson class		
Meyer	DD-279	Clemson class		
Doyen	DD-280	Clemson class		
Sharkey	DD-281	Clemson class		
Toucey	DD-282	Clemson class		
Breck	DD-283	Clemson class		
Isherwood	DD-284	Clemson class		
Case	DD-285	Clemson class		
Lardner	DD-286	Clemson class		
Putnam	DD-287	Clemson class		
Worden	DD-288	Clemson class		
Flusser	DD-289	Clemson class		
Dale	DD-290	Clemson class		
Converse	DD-291	Clemson class		
Reid	DD-292	Clemson class		
Billingsley	DD-293	Clemson class		
Charles Ausburn	DD-294	Clemson class		
Osborne	DD-295	Clemson class		
Chauncey	DD-296	Clemson class	wrecked 8 September 1923, no fatalities	
Fuller	DD-297	Clemson class	wrecked 8 September 1923, no fatalities	
Percival	DD-298	Clemson class		
John Francis Burnes	DD-299	Clemson class		
Farragut	DD-300	Clemson class		
Somers	DD-301	Clemson class		
Stoddert	DD-302	Clemson class		
Reno	DD-303	Clemson class		
Farquhar	DD-304	Clemson class		
Thompson	DD-305	Clemson class		
Kennedy	DD-306	Clemson class		
Paul Hamilton	DD-307	Clemson class		
William Jones	DD-308	Clemson class		
Woodbury	DD-309	Clemson class	wrecked 8 September 1923, no fatalities	
S. P. Lee	DD-310	Clemson class	wrecked 8 September 1923, no fatalities	
Nicholas	DD-311	Clemson class	wrecked 8 September 1923, no fatalities	
Young	DD-312	Clemson class	wrecked 8 September 1923, 20 killed	
Zeilin	DD-313	Clemson class		
Yarborough	DD-314	Clemson class		
La Vallette	DD-315	Clemson class		
Sloat	DD-316	Clemson class		
Wood	DD-317	Clemson class		
Shirk	DD-318	Clemson class		
Kidder	DD-319	Clemson class		
Selfridge	DD-320	Clemson class		
Marcus	DD-321	Clemson class		
Mervine	DD-322	Clemson class		
Chase	DD-323	Clemson class		
Robert Smith	DD-324	Clemson class		
Mullany	DD-325	Clemson class		
Coghlan	DD-326	Clemson class		
Preston	DD-327	Clemson class		
Lamson	DD-328	Clemson class		
Bruce	DD-329	Clemson class		
Hull	DD-330	Clemson class		
Macdonough	DD-331	Clemson class		
Farenholt	DD-332	Clemson class		
Sumner	DD-333	Clemson class		
Corry	DD-334	Clemson class		
Melvin	DD-335	Clemson class		
Litchfield	DD-336	Clemson class	later AG-95	
Zane	DD-337	Clemson class	later DMS-14, AG-109	
Wasmuth	DD-338	Clemson class	later DMS-15, sunk in storm by own depth charges, 29 December 1942	
Trever	DD-339	Clemson class	later DMS-16, AG-110	
Perry	DD-340	Clemson class		
Decatur	DD-341	Clemson class		
Hulbert	DD-342	Clemson class	later AVP-19, AVD-6, conversion to APD-28 canceled	
Noa	DD-343	Clemson class	later APD-24, sunk in collision 12 September 1944, no deaths	
William B. Preston	DD-344	Clemson class	later AVP-20, AVD-7	
Preble	DD-345	Clemson class	later DM-20, AG-99	
Sicard	DD-346	Clemson class	later DM-21, AG-100	
Pruitt	DD-347	Clemson class	later DM-22, AG-101	
Farragut	DD-348	Farragut class		
Dewey	DD-349	Farragut class		
Hull	DD-350	Farragut class		
Macdonough	DD-351	Farragut class		
Worden	DD-352	Farragut class		
Dale	DD-353	Farragut class		
Monaghan	DD-354	Farragut class		
Aylwin	DD-355	Farragut class		
Porter	DD-356	Porter class	begin FY34	
Selfridge	DD-357	Porter class		
McDougal	DD-358	Porter class	later AG-126	
Winslow	DD-359	Porter class	later AG-127	
Phelps	DD-360	Porter class		
Clark	DD-361	Porter class		
Moffett	DD-362	Porter class		
Balch	DD-363	Porter class		
Mahan	DD-364	Mahan class		
Cummings	DD-365	Mahan class		
Drayton	DD-366	Mahan class		
Lamson	DD-367	Mahan class		
Flusser	DD-368	Mahan class		
Reid	DD-369	Mahan class		
Case	DD-370	Mahan class		
Conyngham	DD-371	Mahan class		
Cassin	DD-372	Mahan class		
Shaw	DD-373	Mahan class		
Tucker	DD-374	Mahan class		
Downes	DD-375	Mahan class		
Cushing	DD-376	Mahan class		
Perkins	DD-377	Mahan class		
Smith	DD-378	Mahan class		
Preston	DD-379	Mahan class	end FY34	
Gridley	DD-380	Gridley class	begin FY35	
Somers	DD-381	Somers class		
Craven	DD-382	Gridley class		
Warrington	DD-383	Somers class		
Dunlap	DD-384	Mahan class		
Fanning	DD-385	Mahan class		
Bagley	DD-386	Bagley class		
Blue	DD-387	Bagley class		
Helm	DD-388	Bagley class		
Mugford	DD-389	Bagley class		
Ralph Talbot	DD-390	Bagley class		
Henley	DD-391	Bagley class		
Patterson	DD-392	Bagley class		
Jarvis	DD-393	Bagley class	end FY35	
Sampson	DD-394	Somers class	begin FY36	
Davis	DD-395	Somers class		
Jouett	DD-396	Somers class		
Benham	DD-397	Benham class		
Ellet	DD-398	Benham class		
Lang	DD-399	Benham class		
McCall	DD-400	Gridley class		
Maury	DD-401	Gridley class		
Mayrant	DD-402	Benham class		
Trippe	DD-403	Benham class		
Rhind	DD-404	Benham class		
Rowan	DD-405	Benham class		
Stack	DD-406	Benham class		
Sterett	DD-407	Benham class		
Wilson	DD-408	Benham class	end FY36	
Sims	DD-409	Sims class	begin FY37	
Hughes	DD-410	Sims class		
Anderson	DD-411	Sims class		
Hammann	DD-412	Sims class		
Mustin	DD-413	Sims class		
Russell	DD-414	Sims class		
O'Brien	DD-415	Sims class		
Walke	DD-416	Sims class		
Morris	DD-417	Sims class		
Roe	DD-418	Sims class		
Wainwright	DD-419	Sims class		
Buck	DD-420	Sims class	end FY37	
Benson	DD-421	Benson class	begin FY38	
Mayo	DD-422	Benson class		
Gleaves	DD-423	Gleaves class		
Niblack	DD-424	Gleaves class		
Madison	DD-425	Benson class		
Lansdale	DD-426	Benson class		
Hilary P. Jones	DD-427	Benson class		
Charles F. Hughes	DD-428	Benson class	end FY38	
Livermore	DD-429	Gleaves class	begin FY39	
Eberle	DD-430	Gleaves class		
Plunkett	DD-431	Gleaves class		
Kearny	DD-432	Gleaves class		
Gwin	DD-433	Gleaves class		
Meredith	DD-434	Gleaves class		
Grayson	DD-435	Gleaves class		
Monssen	DD-436	Gleaves class	end FY39	
Woolsey	DD-437	Gleaves class	begin FY40	
Ludlow	DD-438	Gleaves class		
Edison	DD-439	Gleaves class		
Ericsson	DD-440	Gleaves class		
Wilkes	DD-441	Gleaves class		
Nicholson	DD-442	Gleaves class		
Swanson	DD-443	Gleaves class		
Ingraham	DD-444	Gleaves class	end FY40	
Fletcher	DD-445	Fletcher class	see Two-Ocean Navy Act	
Radford	DD-446	Fletcher class		
Jenkins	DD-447	Fletcher class		
La Vallette	DD-448	Fletcher class		
Nicholas	DD-449	Fletcher class		
O'Bannon	DD-450	Fletcher class		
Chevalier	DD-451	Fletcher class		
Percival	DD-452	Fletcher class	cancelled	
Bristol	DD-453	Gleaves class	begin FY41	
Ellyson	DD-454	Gleaves class	later DMS-19	
Hambleton	DD-455	Gleaves class	later DMS-20	
Rodman	DD-456	Gleaves class	later DMS-21	
Emmons	DD-457	Gleaves class	later DMS-22, sunk after Kamikaze attack 6 April 1945, 60 killed	
Macomb	DD-458	Gleaves class	later DMS-23	
Laffey	DD-459	Benson class		
Woodworth	DD-460	Benson class	end FY41	
Forrest	DD-461	Gleaves class	later DMS-24	
Fitch	DD-462	Gleaves class	later DMS-25	
Corry	DD-463	Gleaves class		
Hobson	DD-464	Gleaves class	later DMS-26, sunk in collision 26 April 1952, 176 killed	
Saufley	DD-465	Fletcher class		
Waller	DD-466	Fletcher class		
Strong	DD-467	Fletcher class		
Taylor	DD-468	Fletcher class		
De Haven	DD-469	Fletcher class		
Bache	DD-470	Fletcher class		
Beale	DD-471	Fletcher class		
Guest	DD-472	Fletcher class		
Bennett	DD-473	Fletcher class		
Fullam	DD-474	Fletcher class		
Hudson	DD-475	Fletcher class		
Hutchins	DD-476	Fletcher class		
Pringle	DD-477	Fletcher class		
Stanly	DD-478	Fletcher class		
Stevens	DD-479	Fletcher class		
Halford	DD-480	Fletcher class		
Leutze	DD-481	Fletcher class		
Watson	DD-482	Fletcher class	cancelled	
Aaron Ward	DD-483	Gleaves class		
Buchanan	DD-484	Gleaves class		
Duncan	DD-485	Gleaves class		
Lansdowne	DD-486	Gleaves class		
Lardner	DD-487	Gleaves class		
McCalla	DD-488	Gleaves class		
Mervine	DD-489	Gleaves class	later DMS-31	
Quick	DD-490	Gleaves class	later DMS-32	
Farenholt	DD-491	Benson class		
Bailey	DD-492	Benson class		
Carmick	DD-493	Gleaves class	later DMS-33	
Doyle	DD-494	Gleaves class	later DMS-34	
Endicott	DD-495	Gleaves class	later DMS-35	
McCook	DD-496	Gleaves class	later DMS-36	
Frankford	DD-497	Gleaves class		
Philip	DD-498	Fletcher class		
Renshaw	DD-499	Fletcher class		
Ringgold	DD-500	Fletcher class		
Schroeder	DD-501	Fletcher class		
Sigsbee	DD-502	Fletcher class		
Stevenson	DD-503	Stevenson class	cancelled	
Stockton	DD-504	Stevenson class	cancelled	
Thorn	DD-505	Stevenson class	cancelled	
Turner	DD-506	Stevenson class	cancelled	
Conway	DD-507	Fletcher class		
Cony	DD-508	Fletcher class		
Converse	DD-509	Fletcher class		
Eaton	DD-510	Fletcher class		
Foote	DD-511	Fletcher class		
Spence	DD-512	Fletcher class		
Terry	DD-513	Fletcher class		
Thatcher	DD-514	Fletcher class		
Anthony	DD-515	Fletcher class		
Wadsworth	DD-516	Fletcher class		
Walker	DD-517	Fletcher class		
Brownson	DD-518	Fletcher class		
Daly	DD-519	Fletcher class		
Isherwood	DD-520	Fletcher class		
Kimberly	DD-521	Fletcher class		
Luce	DD-522	Fletcher class		
—N/a	DD-523 – DD-525	Fletcher class	cancelled	
Abner Read	DD-526	Fletcher class		
Ammen	DD-527	Fletcher class		
Mullany	DD-528	Fletcher class		
Bush	DD-529	Fletcher class		
Trathen	DD-530	Fletcher class		
Hazelwood	DD-531	Fletcher class		
Heermann	DD-532	Fletcher class		
Hoel	DD-533	Fletcher class		
McCord	DD-534	Fletcher class		
Miller	DD-535	Fletcher class		
Owen	DD-536	Fletcher class		
The Sullivans	DD-537	Fletcher class		
Stephen Potter	DD-538	Fletcher class		
Tingey	DD-539	Fletcher class		
Twining	DD-540	Fletcher class		
Yarnall	DD-541	Fletcher class		
—N/a	DD-542 – DD-543	Fletcher class	cancelled	
Boyd	DD-544	Fletcher class		
Bradford	DD-545	Fletcher class		
Brown	DD-546	Fletcher class		
Cowell	DD-547	Fletcher class		
—N/a	DD-548 – DD-549	Fletcher class	cancelled	
Capps	DD-550	Fletcher class		
David W. Taylor	DD-551	Fletcher class		
Evans	DD-552	Fletcher class		
John D. Henley	DD-553	Fletcher class		
Franks	DD-554	Fletcher class		
Haggard	DD-555	Fletcher class		
Hailey	DD-556	Fletcher class		
Johnston	DD-557	Fletcher class		
Laws	DD-558	Fletcher class		
Longshaw	DD-559	Fletcher class		
Morrison	DD-560	Fletcher class		
Prichett	DD-561	Fletcher class		
Robinson	DD-562	Fletcher class		
Ross	DD-563	Fletcher class		
Rowe	DD-564	Fletcher class		
Smalley	DD-565	Fletcher class		
Stoddard	DD-566	Fletcher class		
Watts	DD-567	Fletcher class		
Wren	DD-568	Fletcher class		
Aulick	DD-569	Fletcher class		
Charles Ausburne	DD-570	Fletcher class		
Claxton	DD-571	Fletcher class		
Dyson	DD-572	Fletcher class		
Harrison	DD-573	Fletcher class		
John Rodgers	DD-574	Fletcher class		
McKee	DD-575	Fletcher class		
Murray	DD-576	Fletcher class		
Sproston	DD-577	Fletcher class		
Wickes	DD-578	Fletcher class		
William D. Porter	DD-579	Fletcher class		
Young	DD-580	Fletcher class		
Charrette	DD-581	Fletcher class		
Conner	DD-582	Fletcher class		
Hall	DD-583	Fletcher class		
Halligan	DD-584	Fletcher class		
Haraden	DD-585	Fletcher class		
Newcomb	DD-586	Fletcher class		
Bell	DD-587	Fletcher class		
Burns	DD-588	Fletcher class		
Izard	DD-589	Fletcher class		
Paul Hamilton	DD-590	Fletcher class		
Twiggs	DD-591	Fletcher class		
Howorth	DD-592	Fletcher class		
Killen	DD-593	Fletcher class		
Hart	DD-594	Fletcher class		
Metcalf	DD-595	Fletcher class		
Shields	DD-596	Fletcher class		
Wiley	DD-597	Fletcher class		
Bancroft	DD-598	Benson class		
Barton	DD-599	Benson class		
Boyle	DD-600	Benson class		
Champlin	DD-601	Benson class		
Meade	DD-602	Benson class		
Murphy	DD-603	Benson class		
Parker	DD-604	Benson class		
Caldwell	DD-605	Benson class		
Coghlan	DD-606	Benson class		
Frazier	DD-607	Benson class		
Gansevoort	DD-608	Benson class		
Gillespie	DD-609	Benson class		
Hobby	DD-610	Benson class		
Kalk	DD-611	Benson class		
Kendrick	DD-612	Benson class		
Laub	DD-613	Benson class		
MacKenzie	DD-614	Benson class		
McLanahan	DD-615	Benson class		
Nields	DD-616	Benson class		
Ordronaux	DD-617	Benson class		
Davison	DD-618	Gleaves class	later DMS-37	
Edwards	DD-619	Gleaves class		
Glennon	DD-620	Gleaves class		
Jeffers	DD-621	Gleaves class	later DMS-27	
Maddox	DD-622	Gleaves class		
Nelson	DD-623	Gleaves class		
Baldwin	DD-624	Gleaves class		
Harding	DD-625	Gleaves class	later DMS-28	
Satterlee	DD-626	Gleaves class		
Thompson	DD-627	Gleaves class	later DMS-38	
Welles	DD-628	Gleaves class		
Abbot	DD-629	Fletcher class		
Braine	DD-630	Fletcher class		
Erben	DD-631	Fletcher class		
Cowie	DD-632	Gleaves class	later DMS-39	
Knight	DD-633	Gleaves class	later DMS-40	
Doran	DD-634	Gleaves class	later DMS-41	
Earle	DD-635	Gleaves class	later DMS-42	
Butler	DD-636	Gleaves class	later DMS-29	
Gherardi	DD-637	Gleaves class	later DMS-30	
Herndon	DD-638	Gleaves class		
Shubrick	DD-639	Gleaves class		
Beatty	DD-640	Gleaves class		
Tillman	DD-641	Gleaves class		
Hale	DD-642	Fletcher class	conversion to DMS-43 canceled	
Sigourney	DD-643	Fletcher class		
Stembel	DD-644	Fletcher class		
Stevenson	DD-645	Gleaves class		
Stockton	DD-646	Gleaves class		
Thorn	DD-647	Gleaves class		
Turner	DD-648	Gleaves class		
Albert W. Grant	DD-649	Fletcher class		
Caperton	DD-650	Fletcher class		
Cogswell	DD-651	Fletcher class		
Ingersoll	DD-652	Fletcher class		
Knapp	DD-653	Fletcher class		
Bearss	DD-654	Fletcher class		
John Hood	DD-655	Fletcher class		
Van Valkenburgh	DD-656	Fletcher class		
Charles J. Badger	DD-657	Fletcher class		
Colahan	DD-658	Fletcher class		
Dashiell	DD-659	Fletcher class		
Bullard	DD-660	Fletcher class		
Kidd	DD-661	Fletcher class		
Bennion	DD-662	Fletcher class		
Heywood L. Edwards	DD-663	Fletcher class		
Richard P. Leary	DD-664	Fletcher class		
Bryant	DD-665	Fletcher class		
Black	DD-666	Fletcher class		
Chauncey	DD-667	Fletcher class		
Clarence K. Bronson	DD-668	Fletcher class		
Cotten	DD-669	Fletcher class		
Dortch	DD-670	Fletcher class		
Gatling	DD-671	Fletcher class		
Healy	DD-672	Fletcher class		
Hickox	DD-673	Fletcher class		
Hunt	DD-674	Fletcher class		
Lewis Hancock	DD-675	Fletcher class		
Marshall	DD-676	Fletcher class		
McDermut	DD-677	Fletcher class		
McGowan	DD-678	Fletcher class		
McNair	DD-679	Fletcher class		
Melvin	DD-680	Fletcher class		
Hopewell	DD-681	Fletcher class		
Porterfield	DD-682	Fletcher class		
Stockham	DD-683	Fletcher class		
Wedderburn	DD-684	Fletcher class		
Picking	DD-685	Fletcher class		
Halsey Powell	DD-686	Fletcher class		
Uhlmann	DD-687	Fletcher class		
Remey	DD-688	Fletcher class		
Wadleigh	DD-689	Fletcher class		
Norman Scott	DD-690	Fletcher class		
Mertz	DD-691	Fletcher class		
Allen M. Sumner	DD-692	Allen M. Sumner class		
Moale	DD-693	Allen M. Sumner class		
Ingraham	DD-694	Allen M. Sumner class		
Cooper	DD-695	Allen M. Sumner class		
English	DD-696	Allen M. Sumner class		
Charles S. Sperry	DD-697	Allen M. Sumner class		
Ault	DD-698	Allen M. Sumner class		
Waldron	DD-699	Allen M. Sumner class		
Haynsworth	DD-700	Allen M. Sumner class		
John W. Weeks	DD-701	Allen M. Sumner class		
Hank	DD-702	Allen M. Sumner class		
Wallace L. Lind	DD-703	Allen M. Sumner class		
Borie	DD-704	Allen M. Sumner class		
Compton	DD-705	Allen M. Sumner class		
Gainard	DD-706	Allen M. Sumner class		
Soley	DD-707	Allen M. Sumner class		
Harlan R. Dickson	DD-708	Allen M. Sumner class		
Hugh Purvis	DD-709	Allen M. Sumner class		
Gearing	DD-710	Gearing class		
Eugene A. Greene	DD-711	Gearing class		
Gyatt	DD-712	Gearing class		
Kenneth D. Bailey	DD-713	Gearing class		
William R. Rush	DD-714	Gearing class		
William M. Wood	DD-715	Gearing class		
Wiltsie	DD-716	Gearing class		
Theodore E. Chandler	DD-717	Gearing class		
Hamner	DD-718	Gearing class		
Epperson	DD-719	Gearing class		
Castle	DD-720	Gearing class	cancelled	
Woodrow R. Thompson	DD-721	Gearing class	cancelled	
Barton	DD-722	Allen M. Sumner class		
Walke	DD-723	Allen M. Sumner class		
Laffey	DD-724	Allen M. Sumner class		
O'Brien	DD-725	Allen M. Sumner class		
Meredith	DD-726	Allen M. Sumner class		
De Haven	DD-727	Allen M. Sumner class		
Mansfield	DD-728	Allen M. Sumner class		
Lyman K. Swenson	DD-729	Allen M. Sumner class		
Collett	DD-730	Allen M. Sumner class		
Maddox	DD-731	Allen M. Sumner class		
Hyman	DD-732	Allen M. Sumner class		
Mannert L. Abele	DD-733	Allen M. Sumner class		
Purdy	DD-734	Allen M. Sumner class		
Robert H. Smith	DD-735	Allen M. Sumner class		
Thomas E. Fraser	DD-736	Allen M. Sumner class		
Shannon	DD-737	Allen M. Sumner class		
Harry F. Bauer	DD-738	Allen M. Sumner class		
Adams	DD-739	Allen M. Sumner class		
Tolman	DD-740	Allen M. Sumner class		
Drexler	DD-741	Allen M. Sumner class		
Frank Knox	DD-742	Gearing class		
Southerland	DD-743	Gearing class		
Blue	DD-744	Allen M. Sumner class		
Brush	DD-745	Allen M. Sumner class		
Taussig	DD-746	Allen M. Sumner class		
Samuel N. Moore	DD-747	Allen M. Sumner class		
Harry E. Hubbard	DD-748	Allen M. Sumner class		
Henry A. Wiley	DD-749	Allen M. Sumner class		
Shea	DD-750	Allen M. Sumner class		
J. William Ditter	DD-751	Allen M. Sumner class		
Alfred A. Cunningham	DD-752	Allen M. Sumner class		
John R. Pierce	DD-753	Allen M. Sumner class		
Frank E. Evans	DD-754	Allen M. Sumner class		
John A. Bole	DD-755	Allen M. Sumner class		
Beatty	DD-756	Allen M. Sumner class		
Putnam	DD-757	Allen M. Sumner class		
Strong	DD-758	Allen M. Sumner class		
Lofberg	DD-759	Allen M. Sumner class		
John W. Thomason	DD-760	Allen M. Sumner class		
Buck	DD-761	Allen M. Sumner class		
Henley	DD-762	Allen M. Sumner class		
William C. Lawe	DD-763	Gearing class		
Lloyd Thomas	DD-764	Gearing class		
Keppler	DD-765	Gearing class		
Lansdale	DD-766	Gearing class	cancelled	
Seymour D. Owens	DD-767	Gearing class	cancelled	
Hoel	DD-768	Gearing class	cancelled	
Abner Read	DD-769	Gearing class	cancelled	
Lowry	DD-770	Allen M. Sumner class		
Lindsey	DD-771	Allen M. Sumner class		
Gwin	DD-772	Allen M. Sumner class		
Aaron Ward	DM-34	Allen M. Sumner class		
Hugh W. Hadley	DD-774	Allen M. Sumner class		
Willard Keith	DD-775	Allen M. Sumner class		
James C. Owens	DD-776	Allen M. Sumner class		
Zellars	DD-777	Allen M. Sumner class		
Massey	DD-778	Allen M. Sumner class		
Douglas H. Fox	DD-779	Allen M. Sumner class		
Stormes	DD-780	Allen M. Sumner class		
Robert K. Huntington	DD-781	Allen M. Sumner class		
Rowan	DD-782	Gearing class		
Gurke	DD-783	Gearing class		
McKean	DD-784	Gearing class		
Henderson	DD-785	Gearing class		
Richard B. Anderson	DD-786	Gearing class		
James E. Kyes	DD-787	Gearing class		
Hollister	DD-788	Gearing class		
Eversole	DD-789	Gearing class		
Shelton	DD-790	Gearing class		
Seaman	DD-791	Gearing class	cancelled	
Callaghan	DD-792	Fletcher class		
Cassin Young	DD-793	Fletcher class		
Irwin	DD-794	Fletcher class		
Preston	DD-795	Fletcher class		
Benham	DD-796	Fletcher class		
Cushing	DD-797	Fletcher class		
Monssen	DD-798	Fletcher class		
Jarvis	DD-799	Fletcher class		
Porter	DD-800	Fletcher class		
Colhoun	DD-801	Fletcher class		
Gregory	DD-802	Fletcher class		
Little	DD-803	Fletcher class		
Rooks	DD-804	Fletcher class		
Chevalier	DD-805	Gearing class		
Higbee	DD-806	Gearing class		
Benner	DD-807	Gearing class		
Dennis J. Buckley	DD-808	Gearing class		
—N/a	DD-809 – DD-816	Gearing class	cancelled	
Corry	DD-817	Gearing class		
New	DD-818	Gearing class		
Holder	DD-819	Gearing class		
Rich	DD-820	Gearing class		
Johnston	DD-821	Gearing class		
Robert H. McCard	DD-822	Gearing class		
Samuel B. Roberts	DD-823	Gearing class		
Basilone	DD-824	Gearing class		
Carpenter	DD-825	Gearing class		
Agerholm	DD-826	Gearing class		
Robert A. Owens	DD-827	Gearing class		
Timmerman	DD-828	Gearing class	later AG-152	
Myles C. Fox	DD-829	Gearing class		
Everett F. Larson	DD-830	Gearing class		
Goodrich	DD-831	Gearing class		
Hanson	DD-832	Gearing class		
Herbert J. Thomas	DD-833	Gearing class		
Turner	DD-834	Gearing class		
Charles P. Cecil	DD-835	Gearing class		
George K. MacKenzie	DD-836	Gearing class		
Sarsfield	DD-837	Gearing class		
Ernest G. Small	DD-838	Gearing class		
Power	DD-839	Gearing class		
Glennon	DD-840	Gearing class		
Noa	DD-841	Gearing class		
Fiske	DD-842	Gearing class		
Warrington	DD-843	Gearing class		
Perry	DD-844	Gearing class		
Bausell	DD-845	Gearing class		
Ozbourn	DD-846	Gearing class		
Robert L. Wilson	DD-847	Gearing class		
Witek	DD-848	Gearing class		
Richard E. Kraus	DD-849	Gearing class	later AG-151	
Joseph P. Kennedy Jr.	DD-850	Gearing class	museum ship	
Rupertus	DD-851	Gearing class		
Leonard F. Mason	DD-852	Gearing class		
Charles H. Roan	DD-853	Gearing class		
—N/a	DD-854 – DD-856	Gearing class	cancelled	
Bristol	DD-857	Allen M. Sumner class		
Fred T. Berry	DD-858	Gearing class		
Norris	DD-859	Gearing class		
McCaffery	DD-860	Gearing class		
Harwood	DD-861	Gearing class		
Vogelgesang	DD-862	Gearing class		
Steinaker	DD-863	Gearing class		
Harold J. Ellison	DD-864	Gearing class		
Charles R. Ware	DD-865	Gearing class		
Cone	DD-866	Gearing class		
Stribling	DD-867	Gearing class		
Brownson	DD-868	Gearing class		
Arnold J. Isbell	DD-869	Gearing class		
Fechteler	DD-870	Gearing class		
Damato	DD-871	Gearing class		
Forrest Royal	DD-872	Gearing class		
Hawkins	DD-873	Gearing class		
Duncan	DD-874	Gearing class		
Henry W. Tucker	DD-875	Gearing class		
Rogers	DD-876	Gearing class		
Perkins	DD-877	Gearing class		
Vesole	DD-878	Gearing class		
Leary	DD-879	Gearing class		
Dyess	DD-880	Gearing class		
Bordelon	DD-881	Gearing class		
Furse	DD-882	Gearing class		
Newman K. Perry	DD-883	Gearing class		
Floyd B. Parks	DD-884	Gearing class		
John R. Craig	DD-885	Gearing class		
Orleck	DD-886	Gearing class		
Brinkley Bass	DD-887	Gearing class		
Stickell	DD-888	Gearing class		
O'Hare	DD-889	Gearing class		
Meredith	DD-890	Gearing class		
—N/a	DD-891 – DD-926	Gearing class	cancelled	
Mitscher	DD-927	Mitscher class	later DL-2	
John S. McCain	DD-928	Mitscher class	later DL-3	
Willis A. Lee	DD-929	Mitscher class	later DL-4	
Wilkinson	DD-930	Mitscher class	later DL-5	
Forrest Sherman	DD-931	Forrest Sherman class		
John Paul Jones	DD-932	Forrest Sherman class		
Barry	DD-933	Forrest Sherman class		
Hanazuki	DD-934	Akizuki class	war prize, Japan	
T35	DD-935	Elbing-class torpedo boat	war prize, German T-35 to France	
Decatur	DD-936	Forrest Sherman class		
Davis	DD-937	Forrest Sherman class		
Jonas Ingram	DD-938	Forrest Sherman class		
Z-39	DD-939	1936A (Mob) class	war prize, German Z-39 to France	
Manley	DD-940	Forrest Sherman class		
Du Pont	DD-941	Forrest Sherman class		
Bigelow	DD-942	Forrest Sherman class		
Blandy	DD-943	Forrest Sherman class		
Mullinnix	DD-944	Forrest Sherman class		
Hull	DD-945	Forrest Sherman class		
Edson	DD-946	Forrest Sherman class		
Somers	DD-947	Forrest Sherman class		
Morton	DD-948	Forrest Sherman class		
Parsons	DD-949	Forrest Sherman class		
Richard S. Edwards	DD-950	Forrest Sherman class		
Turner Joy	DD-951	Forrest Sherman class		
Charles F. Adams	DD-952	Charles F. Adams class		
John King	DD-953	Charles F. Adams class		
Lawrence	DD-954	Charles F. Adams class		
Biddle	DD-955	Charles F. Adams class		
Barney	DD-956	Charles F. Adams class		
Henry B. Wilson	DD-957	Charles F. Adams class		
Lynde McCormick	DD-958	Charles F. Adams class		
Towers	DD-959	Charles F. Adams class		
Akizuki	DD-960	Akizuki class		
Teruzuki	DD-961	Akizuki class		
Shah Jehan	DD-962	Ch subclass		
Spruance	DD-963	Spruance class		
Paul F. Foster	DD-964	Spruance class		
Kinkaid	DD-965	Spruance class		
Hewitt	DD-966	Spruance class		
Elliot	DD-967	Spruance class		
Arthur W. Radford	DD-968	Spruance class		
Peterson	DD-969	Spruance class		
Caron	DD-970	Spruance class		
David R. Ray	DD-971	Spruance class		
Oldendorf	DD-972	Spruance class		
John Young	DD-973	Spruance class		
Comte de Grasse	DD-974	Spruance class		
O'Brien	DD-975	Spruance class		
Merrill	DD-976	Spruance class		
Briscoe	DD-977	Spruance class		
Stump	DD-978	Spruance class		
Conolly	DD-979	Spruance class		
Moosbrugger	DD-980	Spruance class		
John Hancock	DD-981	Spruance class		
Nicholson	DD-982	Spruance class		
John Rodgers	DD-983	Spruance class		
Leftwich	DD-984	Spruance class		
Cushing	DD-985	Spruance class		
Harry W. Hill	DD-986	Spruance class		
O'Bannon	DD-987	Spruance class		
Thorn	DD-988	Spruance class		
Deyo	DD-989	Spruance class		
Ingersoll	DD-990	Spruance class		
Fife	DD-991	Spruance class		
Fletcher	DD-992	Spruance class		
Kidd	DDG-993	Kidd class	ordered by the Imperial Iranian Navy as Kourosh; completed as Kidd	
Callaghan	DDG-994	Kidd class	ordered by the Imperial Iranian Navy as Daryush; completed as Callaghan	
Scott	DDG-995	Kidd class	ordered by the Imperial Iranian Navy as Nader; completed as Scott	
Chandler	DDG-996	Kidd class	ordered by the Imperial Iranian Navy as Andushirvan; completed as Chandler	
Hayler	DD-997	Spruance class		

== Destroyer leaders ==
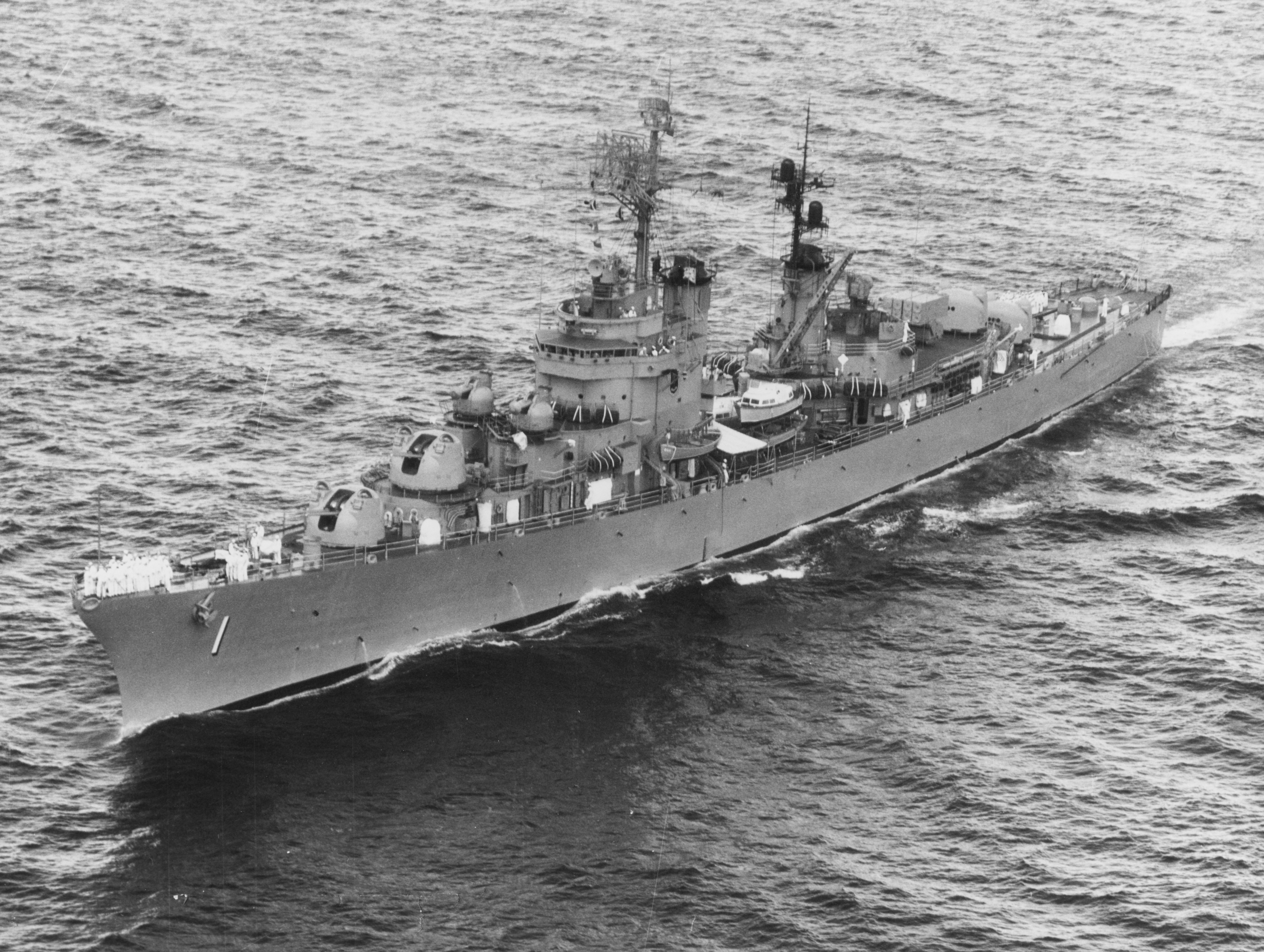
USS Norfolk (DL-1)

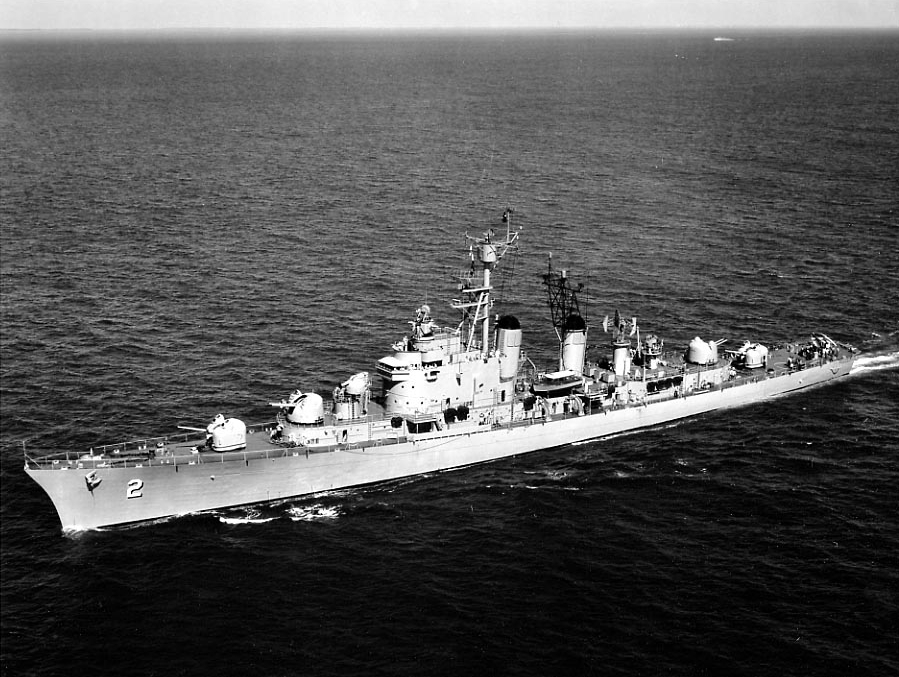
USS Mitscher (DL-2)

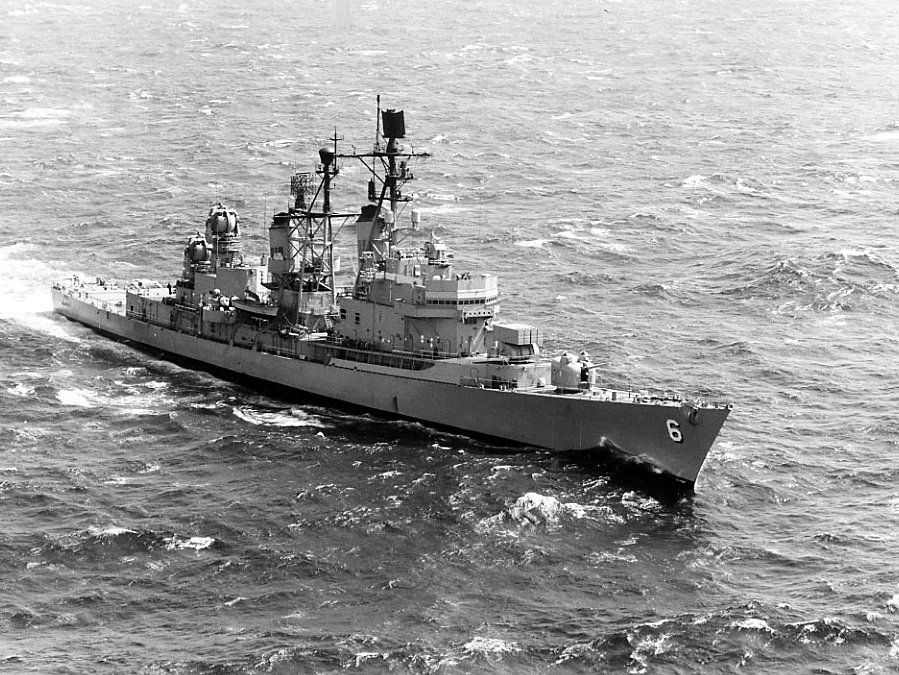
USS Farragut (DLG-6)

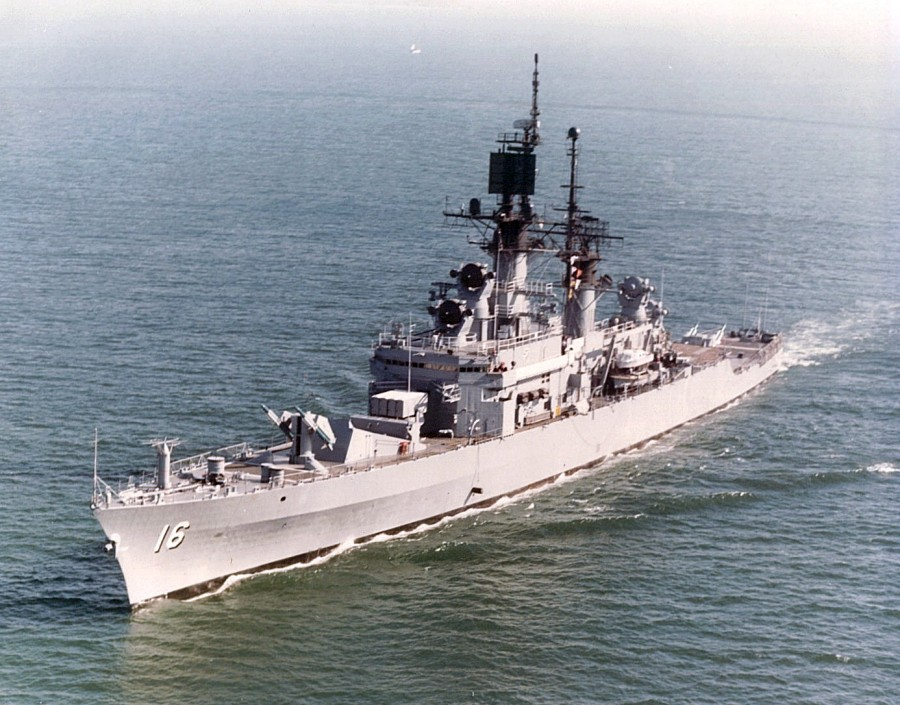
USS Leahy (DLG-16)

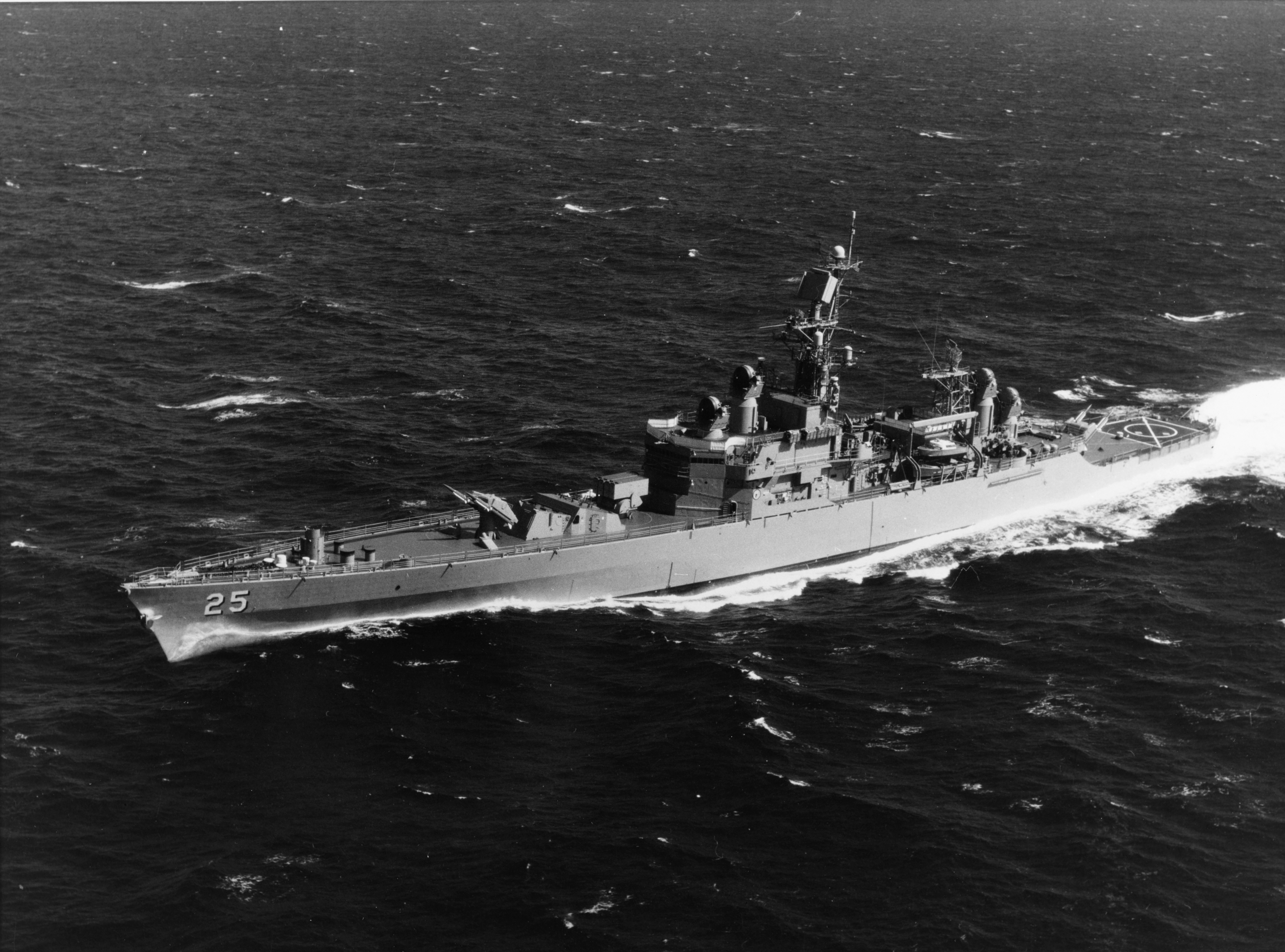
USS Bainbridge (DLGN-25)

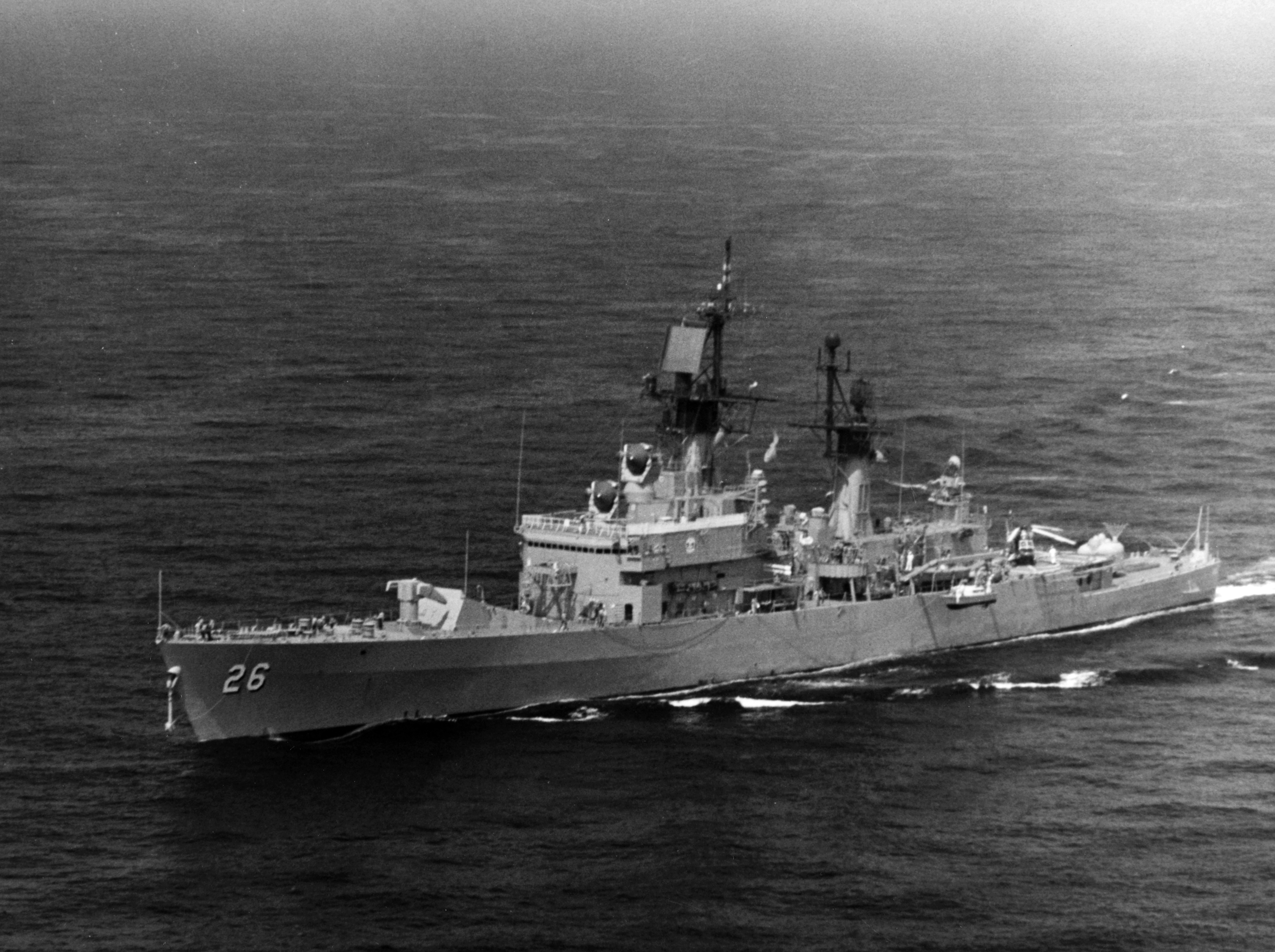
USS Belknap (DLG-26)

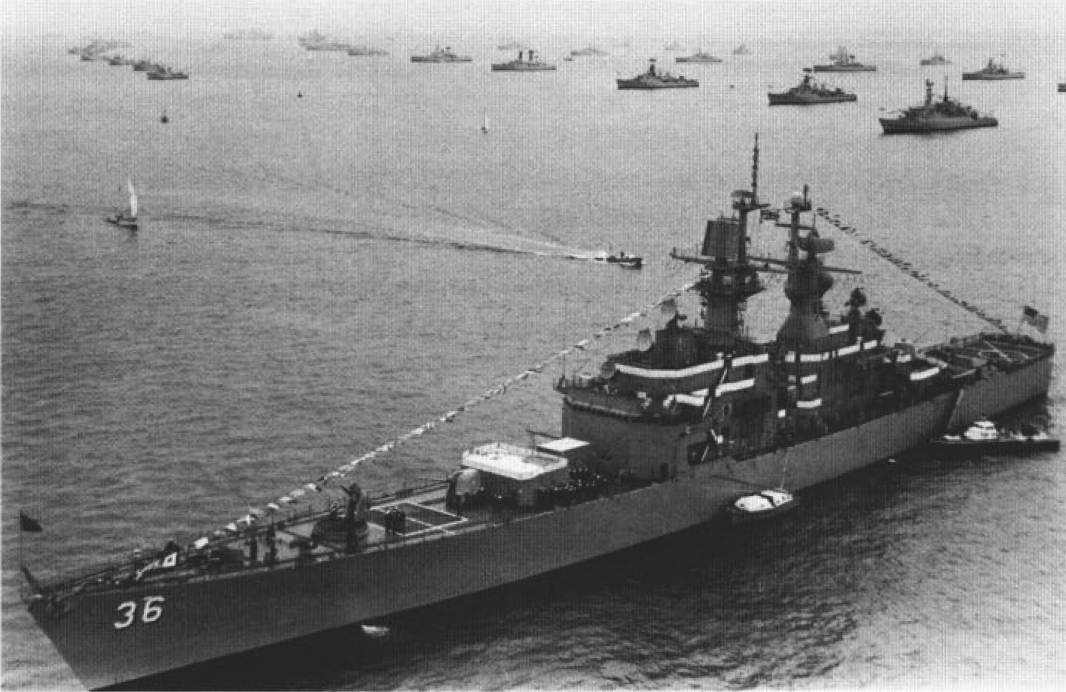
USS California (DLGN/CGN-36)

The DL category was established in 1951, with the abolition of the experimental CLK category. CLK-1 became DL-1 and DDs 927–930 became DLs 2–5. By the mid-1950s the term destroyer leader had been dropped in favor of frigate. The DLG sequence was deactivated in the 1975 fleet realignment, most DLGs and DLGNs were reclassified as CGs and CGNs, 30 June 1975. However, DLG 6–15 became DDG 37–46. DL-1 through DL-5 had been decommissioned prior to this time; DLG-6 Farragut through DLG-15 Preble became DDG-37 through DDG-46. DLG-16 Leahy through DLGN-40 Mississippi became CG-16 through CGN-40.

List of United States Navy destroyer leaders
Ship name	Hull number	Ship class	Notes	Refs
Norfolk	DL-1	Norfolk	ex-CLK-1	
Mitscher	DL-2	Mitscher class	ex-DD-927, later DDG-35	
John S. McCain	DL-3	Mitscher class	ex-DD-928, later DDG-36	
Willis A. Lee	DL-4	Mitscher class	ex-DD-929	
Wilkinson	DL-5	Mitscher class	ex-DD-930	
Farragut	DL-6	Farragut class		
Luce	DL-7	Farragut class		
Macdonough	DL-8	Farragut class		
Coontz	DLG-9	Farragut class		
King	DLG-10	Farragut class		
Mahan	DLG-11	Farragut class		
Dahlgren	DLG-12	Farragut class		
William V. Pratt	DLG-13	Farragut class		
Dewey	DLG-14	Farragut class		
Preble	DLG-15	Farragut class		
Leahy	DLG-16	Leahy-class cruiser		
Harry E. Yarnell	DLG-17	Leahy-class cruiser		
Worden	DLG-18	Leahy-class cruiser		
Dale	DLG-19	Leahy-class cruiser		
Richmond K. Turner	DLG-20	Leahy-class cruiser		
Gridley	DLG-21	Leahy-class cruiser		
England	DLG-22	Leahy-class cruiser		
Halsey	DLG-23	Leahy-class cruiser		
Reeves	DLG-24	Leahy-class cruiser		
Bainbridge	DLGN-25	Bainbridge		
Belknap	DLG-26	Belknap-class cruiser		
Josephus Daniels	DLG-27	Belknap-class cruiser		
Wainwright	DLG-28	Belknap-class cruiser		
Jouett	DLG-29	Belknap-class cruiser		
Horne	DLG-30	Belknap-class cruiser		
Sterett	DLG-31	Belknap-class cruiser		
William H. Standley	DLG-32	Belknap-class cruiser		
Fox	DLG-33	Belknap-class cruiser		
Biddle	DLG-34	Belknap-class cruiser		
Truxtun	DLGN-35	Truxtun		
California	DLGN-36	California-class cruiser		
South Carolina	DLGN-37	California-class cruiser		
Virginia	DLGN-38	Virginia-class cruiser		
Texas	DLGN-39	Virginia-class cruiser		
Mississippi	DLGN-40	Virginia-class cruiser		
Arkansas	CGN-41	Virginia-class cruiser	Arkansas was authorized after the 1975 fleet reorganization and was never designated with or carried the hull classification symbol DLGN	

== Guided missile destroyers ==
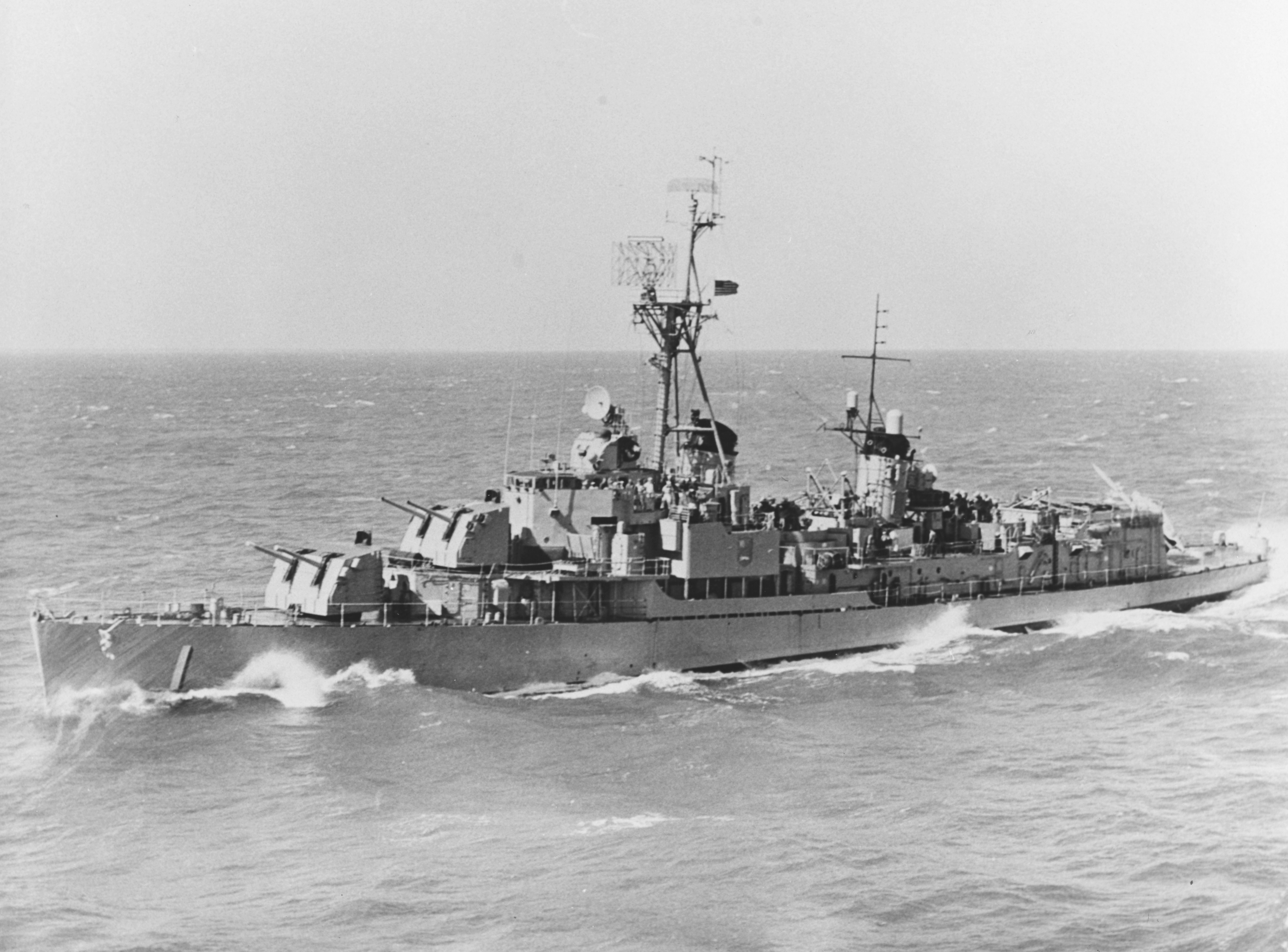
USS Gyatt (DDG-1)

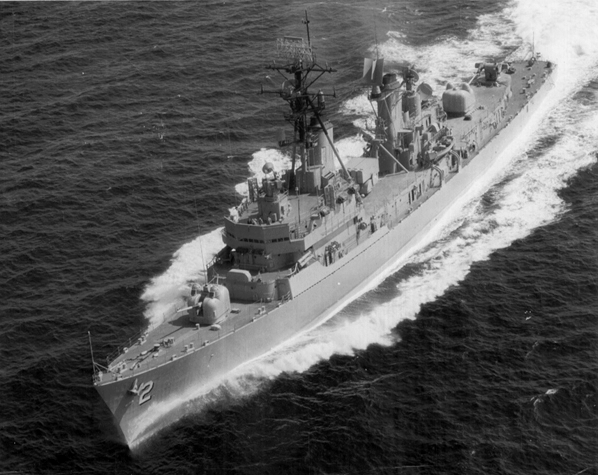
USS Charles F. Adams (DDG-2)

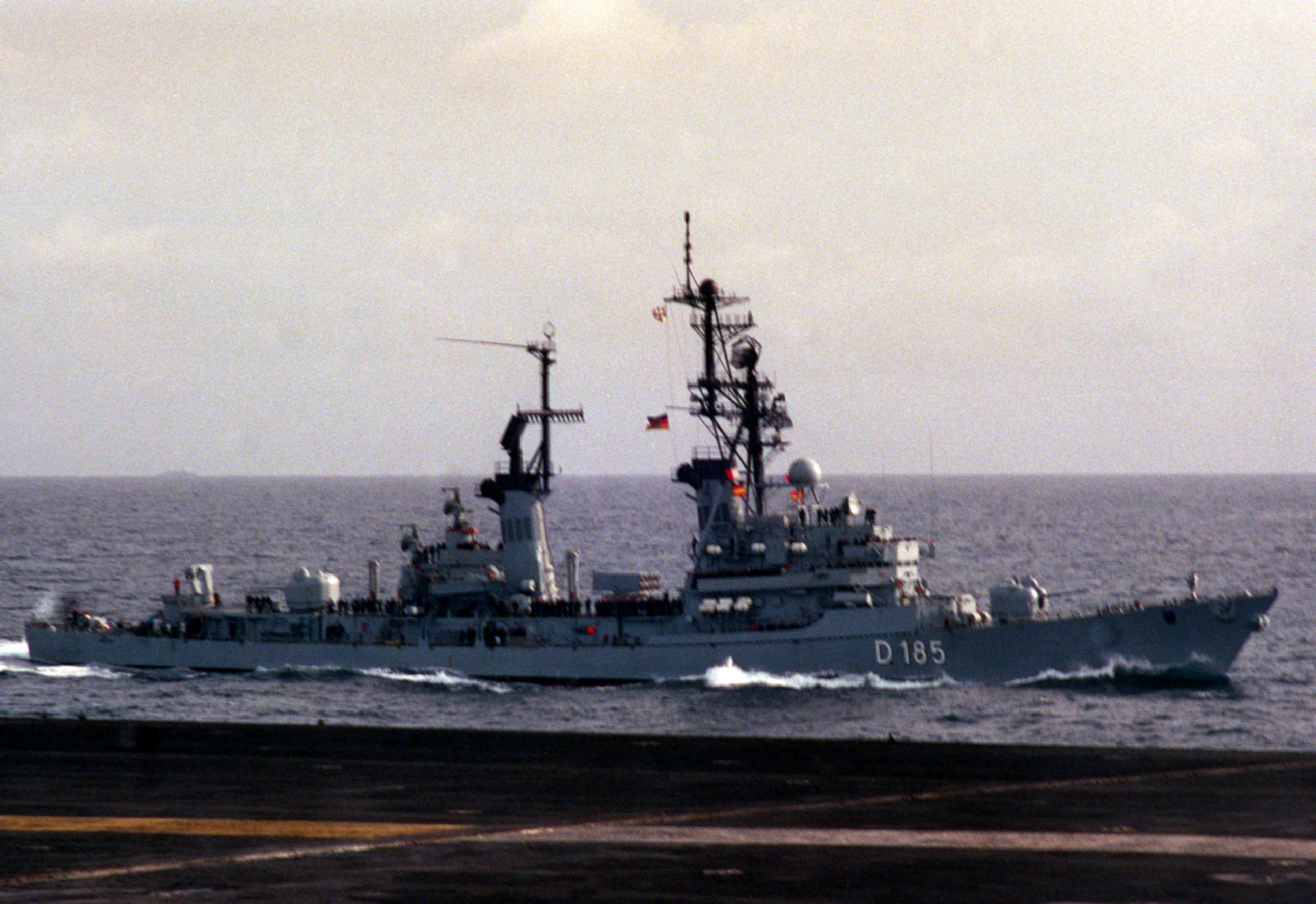
West German destroyer Lütjens (D185)

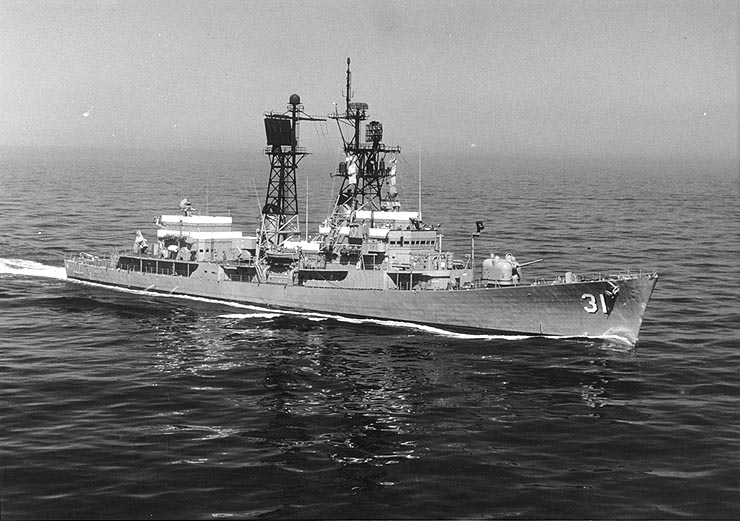
USS Decatur (DDG-31)

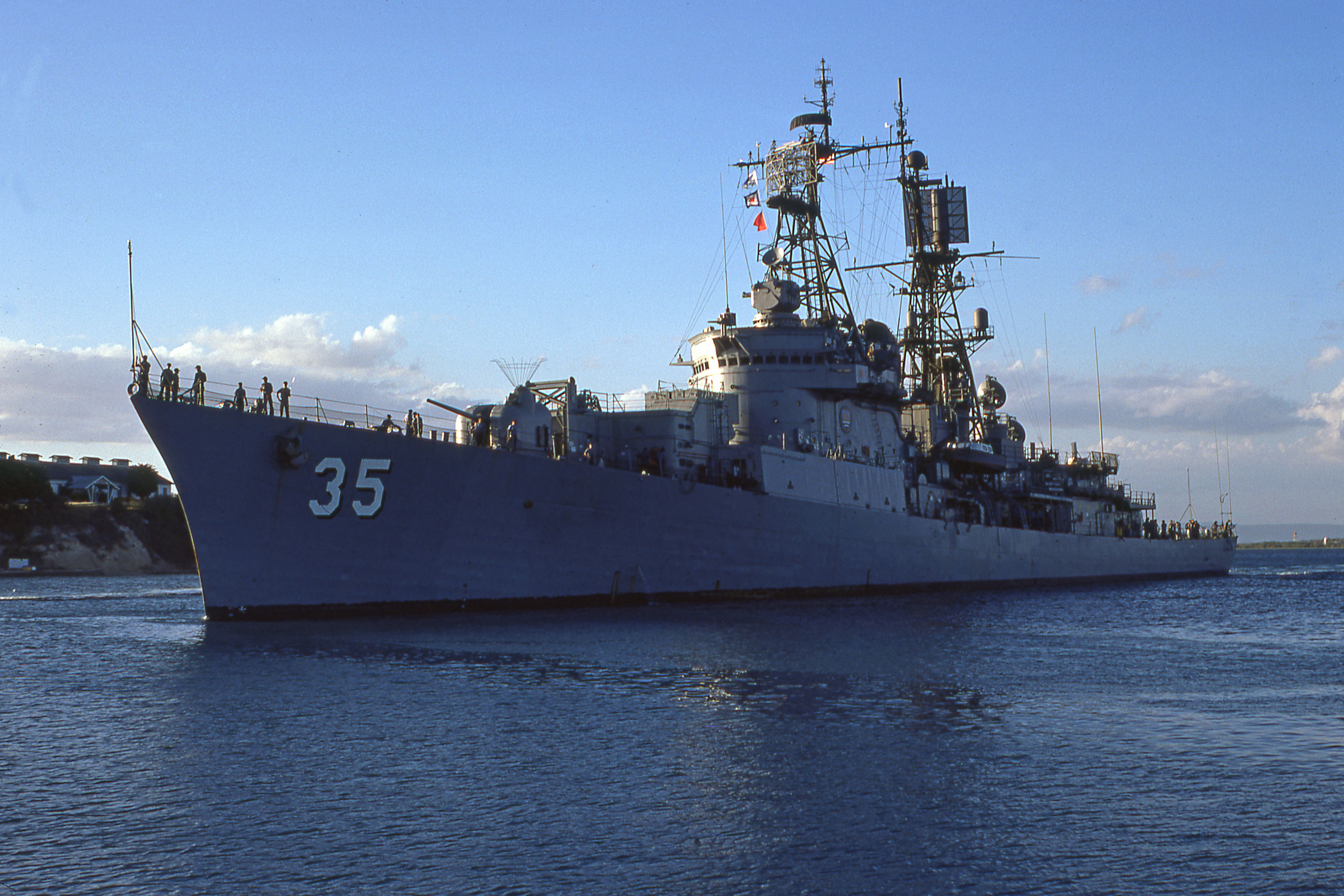
USS Mitscher (DDG-35)

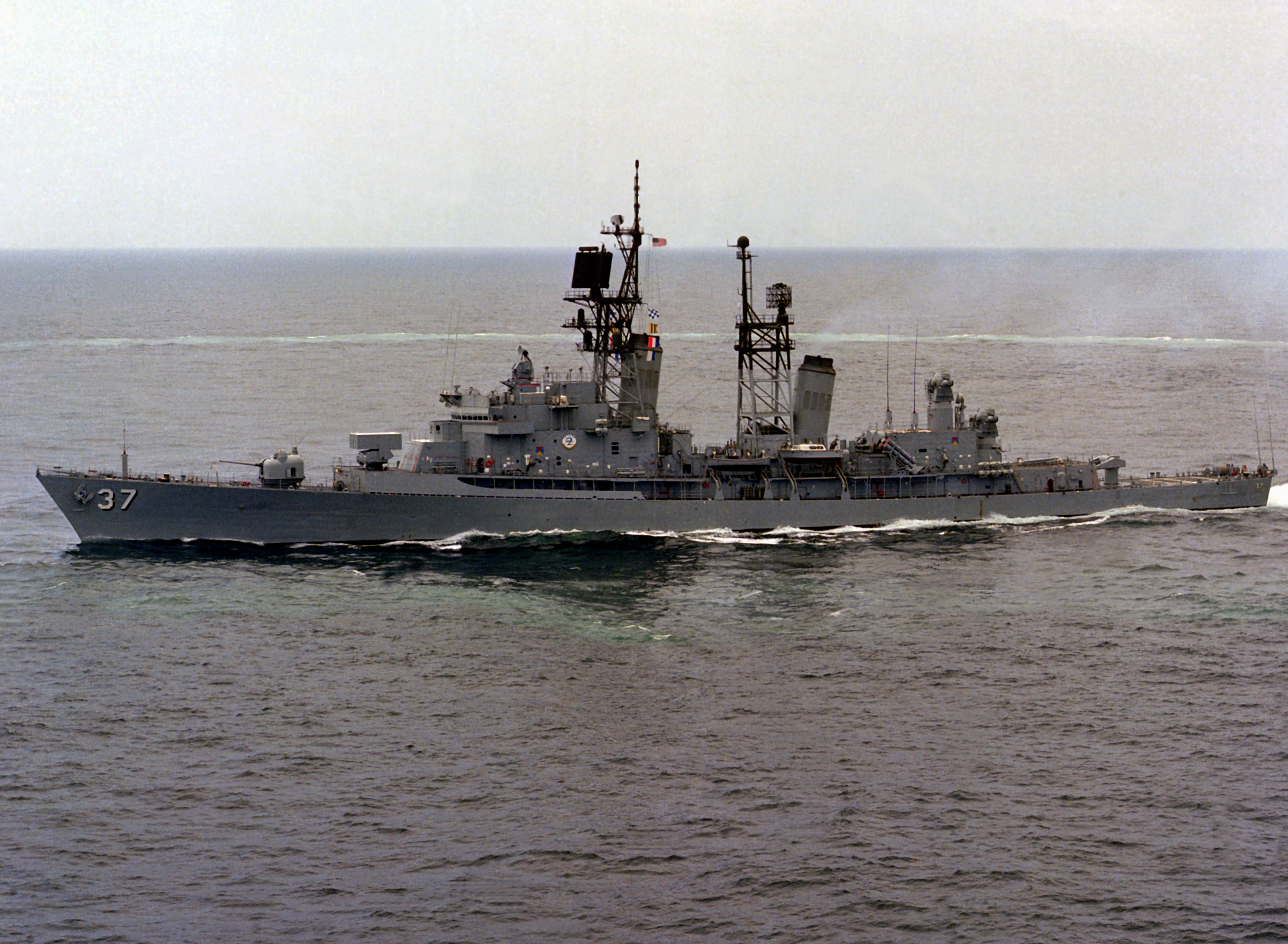
USS Farragut (DDG-37)

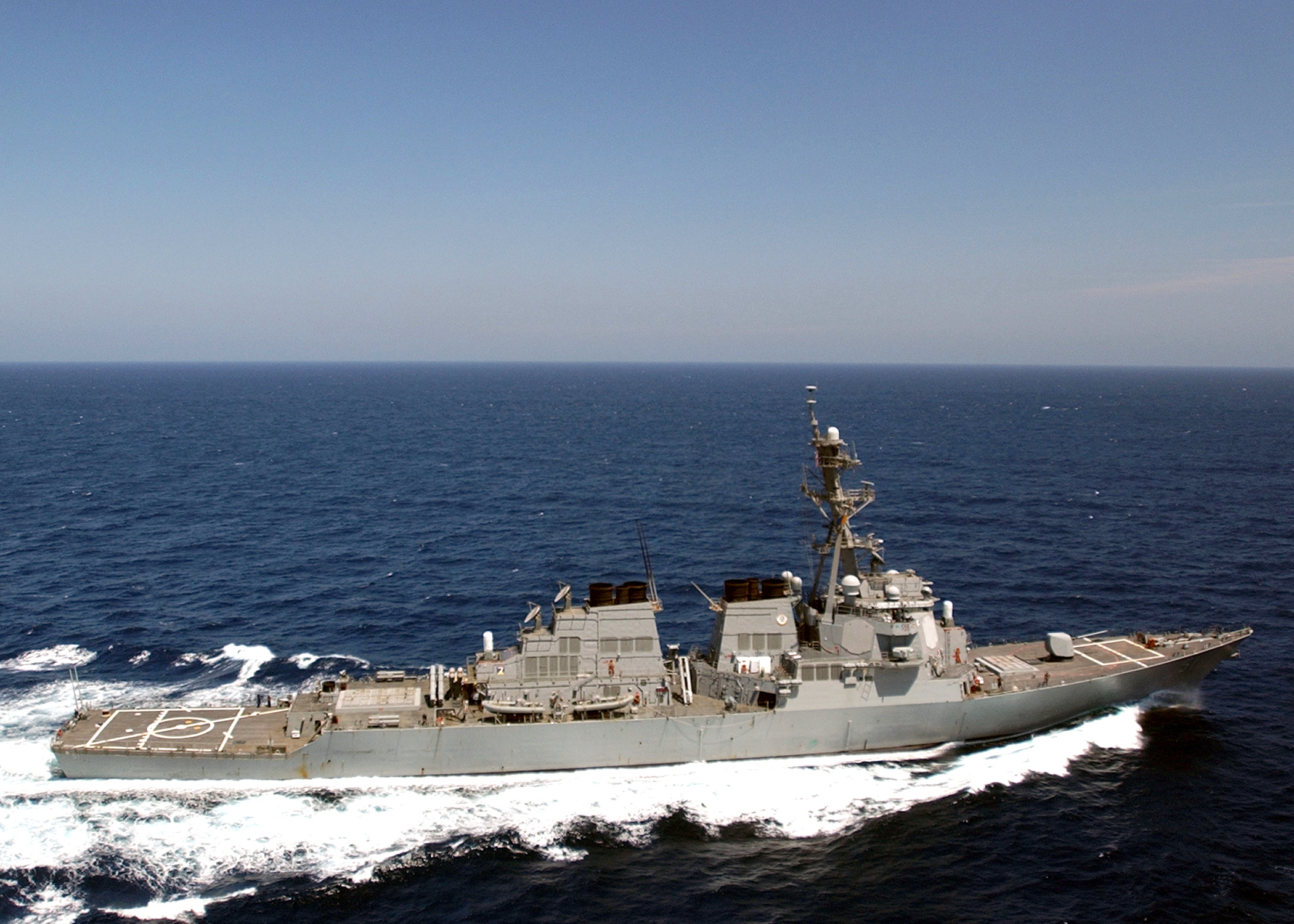
Arleigh Burke (DDG-51)

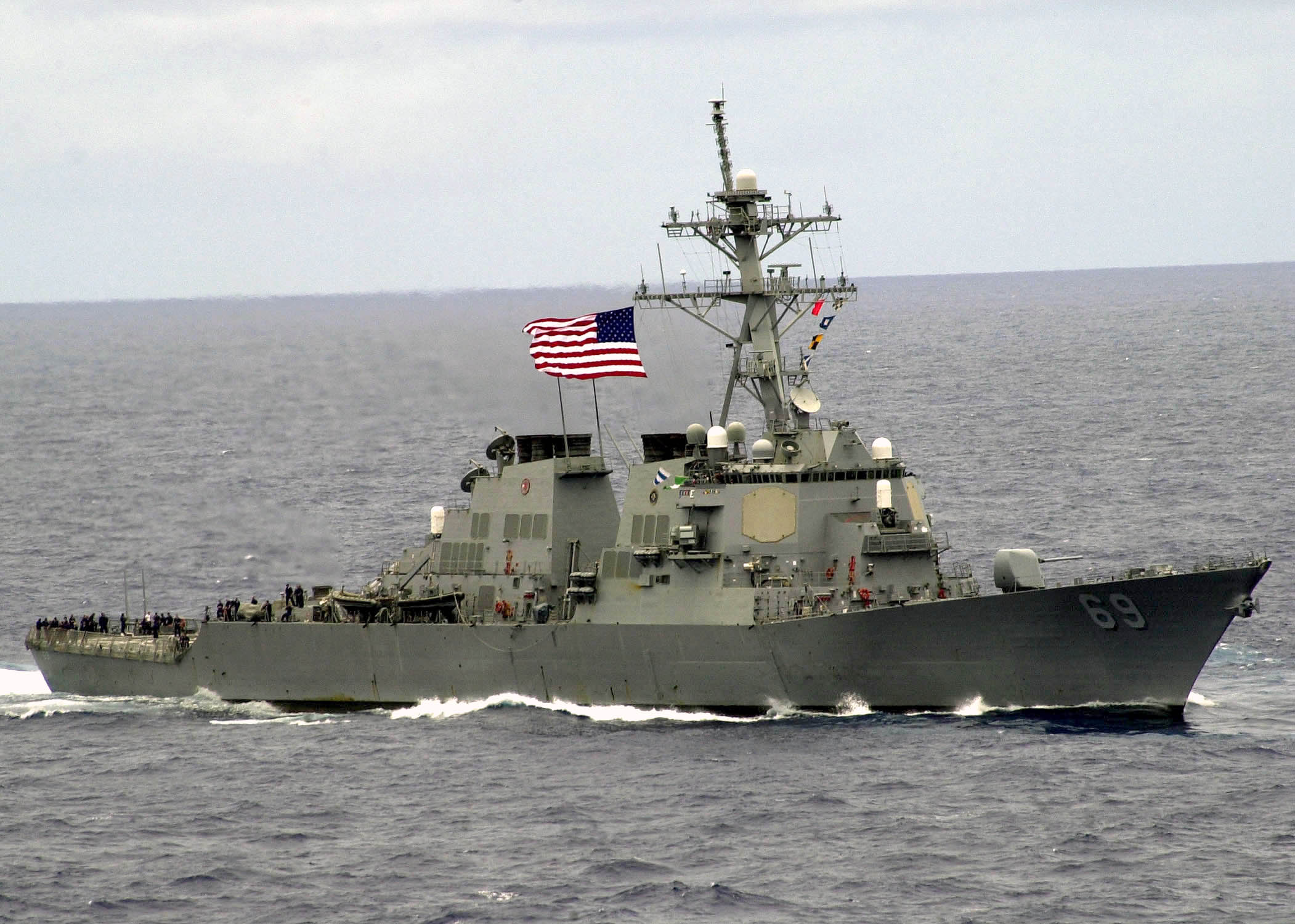
USS Milius (DDG-69)

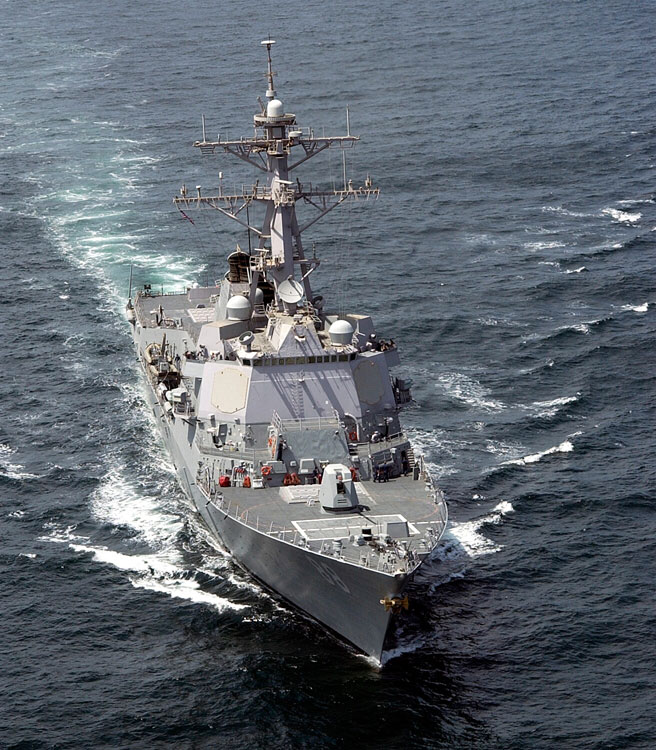
USS Preble (DDG-88)

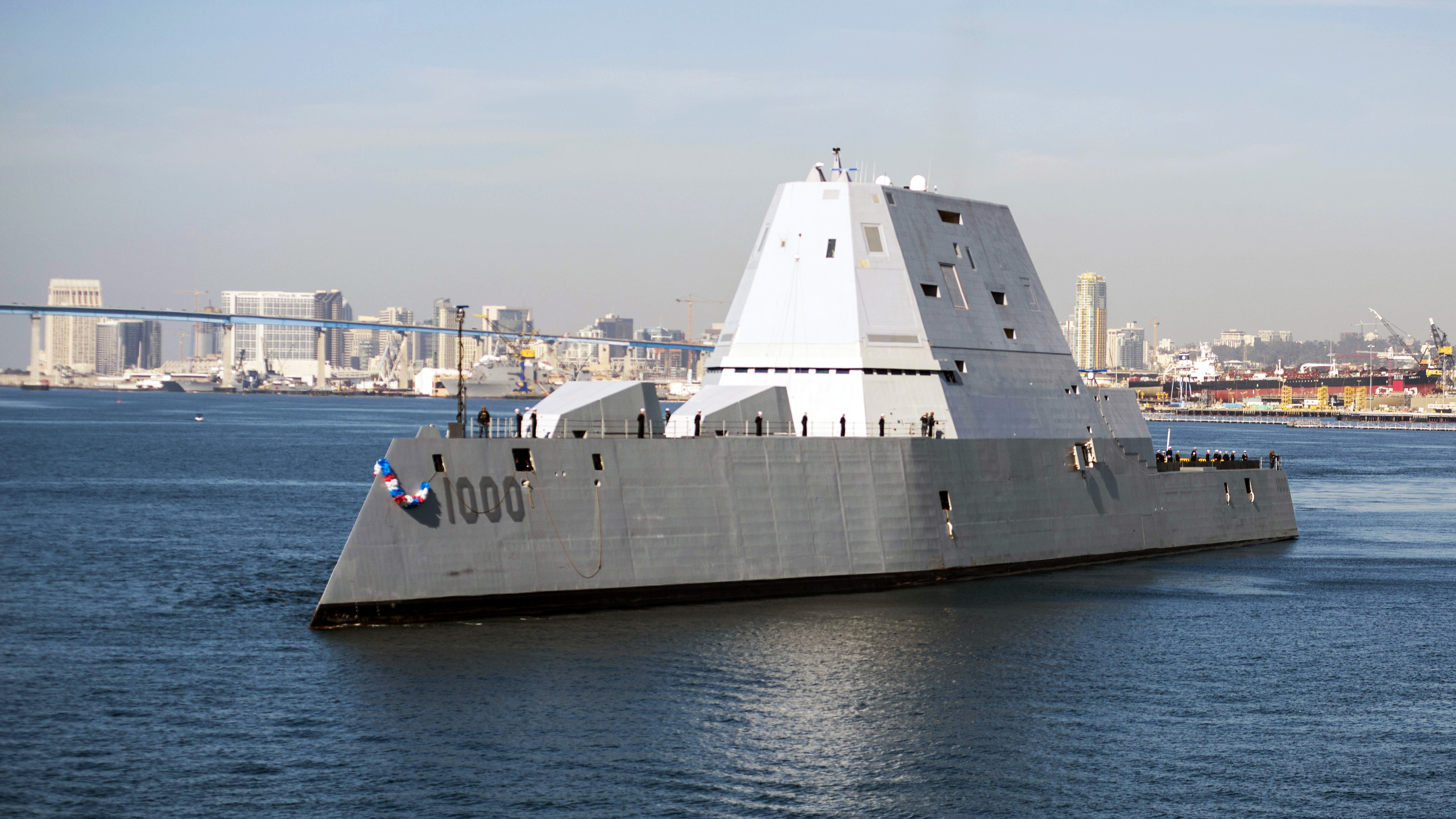
USS Zumwalt (DDG-1000)

The guided missile destroyer sequence has three irregularities: four DDGs are numbered as if they were Destroyers in the original sequence (DDG-993, -994, -995 and -996), two were redesignated as guided missile cruisers (CG) (DDG-47 and DDG-48), and two numbers were skipped (DDG-49 and DDG-50). The Zumwalt class picks up at DDG-1000.

List of United States Navy guided missile destroyers
Ship name	Hull number	Ship class	Notes	Refs
Gyatt	DDG-1	Gearing class		
Charles F. Adams	DDG-2	Charles F. Adams class		
John King	DDG-3	Charles F. Adams class		
Lawrence	DDG-4	Charles F. Adams class		
Biddle/Claude V. Rickets	DDG-5	Charles F. Adams class		
Barney	DDG-6	Charles F. Adams class		
Henry B. Wilson	DDG-7	Charles F. Adams class		
Lynde McCormick	DDG-8	Charles F. Adams class		
Towers	DDG-9	Charles F. Adams class		
Sampson	DDG-10	Charles F. Adams class		
Sellers	DDG-11	Charles F. Adams class		
Robison	DDG-12	Charles F. Adams class		
Hoel	DDG-13	Charles F. Adams class		
Buchanan	DDG-14	Charles F. Adams class		
Berkeley	DDG-15	Charles F. Adams class		
Joseph Strauss	DDG-16	Charles F. Adams class		
Conyngham	DDG-17	Charles F. Adams class		
Semmes	DDG-18	Charles F. Adams class		
Tattnall	DDG-19	Charles F. Adams class		
Goldsborough	DDG-20	Charles F. Adams class		
Cochrane	DDG-21	Charles F. Adams class		
Benjamin Stoddert	DDG-22	Charles F. Adams class		
Richard E. Byrd	DDG-23	Charles F. Adams class		
Waddell	DDG-24	Charles F. Adams class		
HMAS Perth	DDG-25	Charles F. Adams class		
HMAS Hobart	DDG-26	Charles F. Adams class		
HMAS Brisbane	DDG-27	Charles F. Adams class		
D185 Lütjens	DDG-28	Lütjens class		
D186 Mölders	DDG-29	Lütjens class		
D187 Rommel	DDG-30	Lütjens class		
Decatur	DDG-31	Forrest Sherman class		
John Paul Jones	DDG-32	Forrest Sherman class		
Parsons	DDG-33	Forrest Sherman class		
Somers	DDG-34	Forrest Sherman class		
Mitscher	DDG-35	Mitscher class	ex-DL-2	
John S. McCain	DDG-36	Mitscher class	ex-DL-3	
Farragut	DDG-37	Farragut class		
Luce	DDG-38	Farragut class		
Macdonough	DDG-39	Farragut class		
Coontz	DDG-40	Farragut class		
King	DDG-41	Farragut class		
Mahan	DDG-42	Farragut class		
Dahlgren	DDG-43	Farragut class		
William V. Pratt	DDG-44	Farragut class		
Dewey	DDG-45	Farragut class		
Preble	DDG-46	Farragut class		
Ticonderoga	DDG-47	Ticonderoga-class cruiser	became CG-47, shifted to CG 47 Jan 1980	
Yorktown	DDG-48	Ticonderoga-class cruiser	became CG-48, shifted to CG 48 Jan 1980	
Vincennes	DDG-49	Ticonderoga-class cruiser	never officially designated DDG-49, shifted to CG 49 Jan 1980	
Valley Forge	DDG-50	Ticonderoga-class cruiser	never officially designated DDG-50, shifted to CG 50 Jan 1980	
Arleigh Burke	DDG-51	Arleigh Burke class		
Barry	DDG-52	Arleigh Burke class		
John Paul Jones	DDG-53	Arleigh Burke class		
Curtis Wilbur	DDG-54	Arleigh Burke class		
Stout	DDG-55	Arleigh Burke class		
John S. McCain	DDG-56	Arleigh Burke class		
Mitscher	DDG-57	Arleigh Burke class		
Laboon	DDG-58	Arleigh Burke class		
Russell	DDG-59	Arleigh Burke class		
Paul Hamilton	DDG-60	Arleigh Burke class		
Ramage	DDG-61	Arleigh Burke class		
Fitzgerald	DDG-62	Arleigh Burke class		
Stethem	DDG-63	Arleigh Burke class		
Carney	DDG-64	Arleigh Burke class		
Benfold	DDG-65	Arleigh Burke class		
Gonzalez	DDG-66	Arleigh Burke class		
Cole	DDG-67	Arleigh Burke class		
The Sullivans	DDG-68	Arleigh Burke class		
Milius	DDG-69	Arleigh Burke class		
Hopper	DDG-70	Arleigh Burke class		
Ross	DDG-71	Arleigh Burke class		
Mahan	DDG-72	Arleigh Burke class		
Decatur	DDG-73	Arleigh Burke class		
McFaul	DDG-74	Arleigh Burke class		
Donald Cook	DDG-75	Arleigh Burke class		
Higgins	DDG-76	Arleigh Burke class		
O'Kane	DDG-77	Arleigh Burke class		
Porter	DDG-78	Arleigh Burke class		
Oscar Austin	DDG-79	Arleigh Burke class		
Roosevelt	DDG-80	Arleigh Burke class		
Winston Churchill	DDG-81	Arleigh Burke class		
Lassen	DDG-82	Arleigh Burke class		
Howard	DDG-83	Arleigh Burke class		
Bulkeley	DDG-84	Arleigh Burke class		
McCampbell	DDG-85	Arleigh Burke class		
Shoup	DDG-86	Arleigh Burke class		
Mason	DDG-87	Arleigh Burke class		
Preble	DDG-88	Arleigh Burke class		
Mustin	DDG-89	Arleigh Burke class		
Chafee	DDG-90	Arleigh Burke class		
Pinckney	DDG-91	Arleigh Burke class		
Momsen	DDG-92	Arleigh Burke class		
Chung-Hoon	DDG-93	Arleigh Burke class		
Nitze	DDG-94	Arleigh Burke class		
James E. Williams	DDG-95	Arleigh Burke class		
Bainbridge	DDG-96	Arleigh Burke class		
Halsey	DDG-97	Arleigh Burke class		
Forrest Sherman	DDG-98	Arleigh Burke class		
Farragut	DDG-99	Arleigh Burke class		
Kidd	DDG-100	Arleigh Burke class		
Gridley	DDG-101	Arleigh Burke class		
Sampson	DDG-102	Arleigh Burke class		
Truxtun	DDG-103	Arleigh Burke class		
Sterett	DDG-104	Arleigh Burke class		
Dewey	DDG-105	Arleigh Burke class		
Stockdale	DDG-106	Arleigh Burke class		
Gravely	DDG-107	Arleigh Burke class		
Wayne E. Meyer	DDG-108	Arleigh Burke class		
Jason Dunham	DDG-109	Arleigh Burke class		
William P. Lawrence	DDG-110	Arleigh Burke class		
Spruance	DDG-111	Arleigh Burke class		
Michael Murphy	DDG-112	Arleigh Burke class		
John Finn	DDG-113	Arleigh Burke class		
Ralph Johnson	DDG-114	Arleigh Burke class		
Rafael Peralta	DDG-115	Arleigh Burke class		
Thomas Hudner	DDG-116	Arleigh Burke class		
Paul Ignatius	DDG-117	Arleigh Burke class		
Daniel Inouye	DDG-118	Arleigh Burke class		
Delbert D. Black	DDG-119	Arleigh Burke class		
Carl M. Levin	DDG-120	Arleigh Burke class		
Frank E. Petersen Jr.	DDG-121	Arleigh Burke class		
John Basilone	DDG-122	Arleigh Burke class		
Lenah H. Sutcliffe Higbee	DDG-123	Arleigh Burke class		
Harvey C. Barnum Jr.	DDG-124	Arleigh Burke class	(Note: Not in service, as of November 2024)	
Jack H. Lucas	DDG-125	Arleigh Burke class		
Louis H. Wilson Jr.	DDG-126	Arleigh Burke class		
Patrick Gallagher	DDG-127	Arleigh Burke class		
Ted Stevens	DDG-128	Arleigh Burke class		
Jeremiah Denton	DDG-129	Arleigh Burke class		
William Charette	DDG-130	Arleigh Burke class		
George M. Neal	DDG-131	Arleigh Burke class		
Quentin Walsh	DDG-132	Arleigh Burke class		
Sam Nunn	DDG-133	Arleigh Burke class		
John E. Kilmer	DDG-134	Arleigh Burke class		
Thad Cochran	DDG-135	Arleigh Burke class		
Richard G. Lugar	DDG-136	Arleigh Burke class		
John F. Lehman	DDG-137	Arleigh Burke class		
J. William Middendorf	DDG-138	Arleigh Burke class		
Telesforo Trinidad	DDG-139	Arleigh Burke class		
Thomas G. Kelley	DDG-140	Arleigh Burke class		
Ernest E. Evans	DDG-141	Arleigh Burke class		
Charles J. French	DDG-142	Arleigh Burke class		
Richard J. Danzig	DDG-143	Arleigh Burke class		
Michael G. Mullen	DDG-144	Arleigh Burke class		
Intrepid	DDG-145	Arleigh Burke class		
Robert Kerrey	DDG-146	Arleigh Burke class		
Ray Mabus	DDG-147	Arleigh Burke class		
Kyle Carpenter	DDG-148	Arleigh Burke class		
Robert R. Ingram	DDG-149	Arleigh Burke class		
Zumwalt	DDG-1000	Zumwalt class		
Michael Monsoor	DDG-1001	Zumwalt class		
Lyndon B. Johnson	DDG-1002	Zumwalt class		

== See also ==
- List of current ships of the United States Navy
- List of United States Navy ships
- List of United States Navy losses in World War II § Destroyers (DD) - abbreviated list
- List of U.S. Navy ships sunk or damaged in action during World War II § Destroyer (DD) - detailed list
