= List of Fletcher-class destroyers =

List of Fletcher-class destroyers and their final dispositions. There were 175 of them built during World War II. Twenty-five ships (DD 445 to DD 451, and DD 465 to DD 482) were ordered under authorisation of 27 March 1934 (the Vinson-Trammell Act), while the others were authorised under the Act of 19 July 1940.

== Ships in class ==
Ships of the Fletcher destroyer class
Name	Hull no.	Builder	Laid down	Launched	Commissioned/Recommissioned	Decommissioned	Fate
Fletcher	DD-445	Federal Shipbuilding and Drydock Company, Kearny, New Jersey	2 October 1941	3 May 1942	30 June 1942	15 January 1947	Sold for scrap, 22 February 1972
Fletcher	DD-445	Federal Shipbuilding and Drydock Company, Kearny, New Jersey	2 October 1941	3 May 1942	3 October 1949	1 October 1969	Sold for scrap, 22 February 1972
Radford	DD-446	Federal Shipbuilding and Drydock Company, Kearny, New Jersey	2 October 1941	3 May 1942	22 July 1942	17 January 1946	Sold for scrap October 1970
Radford	DD-446	Federal Shipbuilding and Drydock Company, Kearny, New Jersey	2 October 1941	3 May 1942	17 October 1949	10 November 1969	Sold for scrap October 1970
Jenkins	DD-447	Federal Shipbuilding and Drydock Company, Kearny, New Jersey	27 November 1941	21 June 1942	31 July 1942	1 May 1946	Sold for scrap, 17 February 1971
Jenkins	DD-447	Federal Shipbuilding and Drydock Company, Kearny, New Jersey	27 November 1941	21 June 1942	2 November 1951	2 July 1969	Sold for scrap, 17 February 1971
La Vallette	DD-448	Federal Shipbuilding and Drydock Company, Kearny, New Jersey	27 November 1941	21 June 1942	12 August 1942	16 April 1946	Sold to Peru as parts donor, 26 July 1974 scrapped
Nicholas	DD-449	Bath Iron Works, Bath, Maine	3 March 1941	19 February 1942	4 June 1942	12 June 1946	Sold for scrap, October 1970
Nicholas	DD-449	Bath Iron Works, Bath, Maine	3 March 1941	19 February 1942	19 February 1951	30 January 1970	Sold for scrap, October 1970
O'Bannon	DD-450	Bath Iron Works, Bath, Maine	3 March 1941	19 February 1942	26 June 1942	21 May 1946	Sold for scrap, 6 June 1970
O'Bannon	DD-450	Bath Iron Works, Bath, Maine	3 March 1941	19 February 1942	19 February 1951	30 January 1970	Sold for scrap, 6 June 1970
Chevalier	DD-451	Bath Iron Works, Bath, Maine	30 April 1941	11 April 1942	20 July 1942	—N/a	Sunk, Naval Battle of Vella Lavella, 6 October 1943
Saufley	DD-465	Federal Shipbuilding and Drydock Company, Kearny, New Jersey	27 January 1942	19 July 1942	29 August 1942	12 June 1946	Sunk as target, 20 February 1968
Saufley	DD-465	Federal Shipbuilding and Drydock Company, Kearny, New Jersey	27 January 1942	19 July 1942	15 December 1949	29 January 1965	Sunk as target, 20 February 1968
Waller	DD-466	Federal Shipbuilding and Drydock Company, Kearny, New Jersey	12 February 1942	15 August 1942	1 October 1942	10 June 1946	Sunk as target, 17 June 1970
Waller	DD-466	Federal Shipbuilding and Drydock Company, Kearny, New Jersey	12 February 1942	15 August 1942	5 July 1950	15 July 1969	Sunk as target, 17 June 1970
Strong	DD-467	Bath Iron Works, Bath, Maine	30 April 1941	17 May 1942	7 August 1942	—N/a	Sunk, 5 July 1943
Taylor	DD-468	Bath Iron Works, Bath, Maine	28 August 1941	7 June 1942	28 August 1942	31 May 1946	Transferred to Italy, 2 July 1969
Taylor	DD-468	Bath Iron Works, Bath, Maine	28 August 1941	7 June 1942	3 December 1951	3 June 1969	Transferred to Italy, 2 July 1969
De Haven	DD-469	Bath Iron Works, Bath, Maine	27 September 1941	28 June 1942	21 September 1942	—N/a	Sunk, 1 February 1943
Bache	DD-470	Bethlehem Steel Corporation, Staten Island, New York	19 November 1941	7 July 1942	14 November 1942	4 February 1946	Wrecked, 6 February 1968
Bache	DD-470	Bethlehem Steel Corporation, Staten Island, New York	19 November 1941	7 July 1942	1 October 1951	1 March 1968	Wrecked, 6 February 1968
Beale	DD-471	Bethlehem Steel Corporation, Staten Island, New York	19 December 1941	24 August 1942	23 December 1942	11 April 1946	Sunk as target, 24 June 1969
Beale	DD-471	Bethlehem Steel Corporation, Staten Island, New York	19 December 1941	24 August 1942	1 November 1951	30 September 1968	Sunk as target, 24 June 1969
Guest	DD-472	Boston Navy Yard	27 September 1941	20 February 1942	15 December 1942	4 June 1946	Transferred to Brazil, 5 June 1959
Bennett	DD-473	Boston Navy Yard	10 December 1941	16 April 1942	9 February 1943	18 April 1946	Transferred to Brazil, 15 December 1959
Fullam	DD-474	Boston Navy Yard	10 December 1941	16 April 1942	2 March 1943	15 January 1947	Sunk as target, 7 July 1962
Hudson	DD-475	Boston Navy Yard	20 February 1942	3 June 1942	13 April 1943	31 May 1946	Sold for scrap, 27 November 1973
Hutchins	DD-476	Boston Navy Yard	27 September 1941	20 February 1942	17 November 1942	30 November 1945	Sold for scrap, January 1948
Pringle	DD-477	Charleston Navy Yard	31 July 1941	2 May 1942	15 September 1942	—N/a	Sunk, 16 April 1945
Stanly	DD-478	Charleston Navy Yard	15 September 1941	May 2, 1942	15 October 1942	October 1946	Sold for scrap, 16 December 1971
Stevens	DD-479	Charleston Navy Yard	30 December 1941	24 June 1942	1 February 1943	2 July 1946	Sold for scrap, 27 November 1973
Halford	DD-480	Puget Sound Naval Shipyard	3 June 1941	29 October 1942	10 April 1943	15 May 1946	Sold for scrap, 2 April 1970
Leutze	DD-481	Puget Sound Naval Shipyard	3 June 1941	29 October 1942	4 March 1944	6 December 1945	Sold for scrap, 17 June 1947
Watson	DD-482	Federal Shipbuilding and Drydock Company, Kearny, New Jersey	—N/a				Contract cancelled 7 January 1946
Philip	DD-498	Federal Shipbuilding and Drydock Company, Kearny, New Jersey	7 May 1942	13 October 1942	21 November 1942	1 February 1946	Sank in a storm, 2 February 1972
Philip	DD-498	Federal Shipbuilding and Drydock Company, Kearny, New Jersey	7 May 1942	13 October 1942	30 June 1950	30 September 1968	Sank in a storm, 2 February 1972
Renshaw	DD-499	Federal Shipbuilding and Drydock Company, Kearny, New Jersey	7 May 1942	13 October 1942	5 December 1942	February 1947	Sold for scrap, October 1970
Renshaw	DD-499	Federal Shipbuilding and Drydock Company, Kearny, New Jersey	7 May 1942	13 October 1942	June 1950	14 February 1970	Sold for scrap, October 1970
Ringgold	DD-500	Federal Shipbuilding and Drydock Company, Kearny, New Jersey	25 June 1942	11 November 1942	30 December 1942	23 March 1946	Transferred to West German Navy, 14 July 1959
Schroeder	DD-501	Federal Shipbuilding and Drydock Company, Kearny, New Jersey	25 June 1942	11 November 1942	1 January 1943	29 April 1946	Sold for scrap, 1 January 1974
Sigsbee	DD-502	Federal Shipbuilding and Drydock Company, Kearny, New Jersey	22 July 1942	7 December 1942	23 January 1943	31 March 1947	Sold for scrap, 31 July 1975
Conway	DD-507	Bath Iron Works, Bath, Maine	5 November 1941	16 August 1942	9 October 1942	25 June 1946	Sunk as a target 26 June 1970
Conway	DD-507	Bath Iron Works, Bath, Maine	5 November 1941	16 August 1942	8 November 1950	15 November 1969	Sunk as a target 26 June 1970
Cony	DD-508	Bath Iron Works, Bath, Maine	24 December 1941	16 August 1942	30 October 1942	18 June 1946	Sunk as a target, 20 March 1970
Cony	DD-508	Bath Iron Works, Bath, Maine	24 December 1941	16 August 1942	17 November 1949	2 July 1969	Sunk as a target, 20 March 1970
Converse	DD-509	Bath Iron Works, Bath, Maine	23 February 1942	30 August 1942	20 November 1942	23 April 1946	Transferred to Spain, 1 July 1959
Eaton	DD-510	Bath Iron Works, Bath, Maine	17 March 1942	20 September 1942	4 December 1942	21 June 1946	Sunk as target, 27 March 1970
Eaton	DD-510	Bath Iron Works, Bath, Maine	17 March 1942	20 September 1942	11 December 1951	30 May 1969	Sunk as target, 27 March 1970
Foote	DD-511	Bath Iron Works, Bath, Maine	14 April 1942	11 October 1942	22 December 1942	18 April 1946	Sold for scrap, 2 January 1974
Spence	DD-512	Bath Iron Works, Bath, Maine	18 May 1942	27 October 1942	8 January 1943	—N/a	Foundered, 18 December 1944
Terry	DD-513	Bath Iron Works, Bath, Maine	8 June 1942	22 November 1942	26 January 1943	11 July 1947	Transferred to Peru 26 July 1974 for spare parts
Thatcher	DD-514	Bath Iron Works, Bath, Maine	20 June 1942	6 December 1942	10 February 1943	23 November 1945	Sold for scrap, 23 January 1948
Anthony	DD-515	Bath Iron Works, Bath, Maine	17 August 1942	20 December 1942	26 February 1943	17 April 1946	Transferred to West Germany, 17 January 1958
Wadsworth	DD-516	Bath Iron Works, Bath, Maine	18 August 1942	10 January 1943	16 March 1943	18 April 1946	Transferred to West Germany, 6 October 1959
Walker	DD-517	Bath Iron Works, Bath, Maine	31 August 1942	31 January 1943	3 April 1943	31 May 1946	Sold to Italy, 2 July 1969
Walker	DD-517	Bath Iron Works, Bath, Maine	31 August 1942	31 January 1943	15 September 1950	2 July 1969	Sold to Italy, 2 July 1969
Brownson	DD-518	Bethlehem Steel Corporation, Staten Island, New York	15 February 1942	24 September 1942	3 February 1943	—N/a	Sunk, 26 December 1943
Daly	DD-519	Bethlehem Steel Corporation, Staten Island, New York	29 April 1942	24 October 1942	10 March 1943	18 April 1946	Sold for scrap, 22 April 1976
Daly	DD-519	Bethlehem Steel Corporation, Staten Island, New York	29 April 1942	24 October 1942	6 July 1951	2 May 1960	Sold for scrap, 22 April 1976
Isherwood	DD-520	Bethlehem Steel Corporation, Staten Island, New York	12 May 1942	24 November 1942	12 April 1943	1 February 1946	Loaned to Peru, 8 October 1961
Isherwood	DD-520	Bethlehem Steel Corporation, Staten Island, New York	12 May 1942	24 November 1942	5 April 1951	11 September 1961	Loaned to Peru, 8 October 1961
Kimberly	DD-521	Bethlehem Steel Corporation, Staten Island, New York	27 July 1942	4 February 1943	22 May 1943	5 February 1947	Loaned to Taiwan, 1 June 1967
Kimberly	DD-521	Bethlehem Steel Corporation, Staten Island, New York	27 July 1942	4 February 1943	8 February 1951	15 January 1954	Loaned to Taiwan, 1 June 1967
Luce	DD-522	Bethlehem Steel Corporation, Staten Island, New York	24 August 1942	6 March 1943	21 June 1943	—N/a	Sunk, 4 May 1945
Abner Read	DD-526	Bethlehem Shipbuilding Corporation, San Francisco, California	30 October 1941	18 August 1942	5 February 1943	—N/a	Sunk, 1 November 1944
Ammen	DD-527	Bethlehem Shipbuilding Corporation, San Francisco, California	29 November 1941	17 September 1942	20 March 1943	15 April 1946	Sold for scrap, 20 April 1961
Ammen	DD-527	Bethlehem Shipbuilding Corporation, San Francisco, California	29 November 1941	17 September 1942	5 April 1951	15 September 1960	Sold for scrap, 20 April 1961
Mullany	DD-528	Bethlehem Shipbuilding Corporation, San Francisco, California	15 January 1942	10 October 1942	23 April 1943	14 February 1946	Transferred to Taiwan, 6 October 1971
Mullany	DD-528	Bethlehem Shipbuilding Corporation, San Francisco, California	15 January 1942	10 October 1942	8 March 1951	6 October 1971	Transferred to Taiwan, 6 October 1971
Bush	DD-529	Bethlehem Shipbuilding Corporation, San Francisco, California	12 February 1942	27 October 1942	10 May 1943	—N/a	Sunk, 6 April 1945
Trathen	DD-530	Bethlehem Shipbuilding Corporation, San Francisco, California	17 March 1942	22 October 1942	28 May 1943	18 January 1946	Used as target hulk November 1973, scrapped
Trathen	DD-530	Bethlehem Shipbuilding Corporation, San Francisco, California	17 March 1942	22 October 1942	1 August 1951	11 May 1965	Used as target hulk November 1973, scrapped
Hazelwood	DD-531	Bethlehem Shipbuilding Corporation, San Francisco, California	11 April 1942	20 November 1942	18 June 1943	18 January 1946	Sold for scrap 14 April 1976
Hazelwood	DD-531	Bethlehem Shipbuilding Corporation, San Francisco, California	11 April 1942	20 November 1942	12 September 1951	19 March 1965	Sold for scrap 14 April 1976
Heermann	DD-532	Bethlehem Shipbuilding Corporation, San Francisco, California	8 May 1942	5 December 1942	6 July 1943	12 June 1946	Transferred to Argentina, 14 August 1961.
Heermann	DD-532	Bethlehem Shipbuilding Corporation, San Francisco, California	8 May 1942	5 December 1942	12 September 1951	20 December 1957	Transferred to Argentina, 14 August 1961.
Hoel	DD-533	Bethlehem Shipbuilding Corporation, San Francisco, California	4 June 1942	19 December 1942	19 July 1943	—N/a	Sunk, Battle off Samar, 25 October 1944
McCord	DD-534	Bethlehem Shipbuilding Corporation, San Francisco, California	17 March 1942	10 January 1943	19 August 1943	15 January 1947	Sold for scrap 2 January 1974
McCord	DD-534	Bethlehem Shipbuilding Corporation, San Francisco, California	17 March 1942	10 January 1943	1 August 1951	9 June 1954	Sold for scrap 2 January 1974
Miller	DD-535	Bethlehem Shipbuilding Corporation, San Francisco, California	18 August 1942	15 February 1943	31 August 1943	19 December 1945	Sold for scrap, 31 July 1975
Miller	DD-535	Bethlehem Shipbuilding Corporation, San Francisco, California	18 August 1942	15 February 1943	19 May 1951	30 June 1964	Sold for scrap, 31 July 1975
Owen	DD-536	Bethlehem Shipbuilding Corporation, San Francisco, California	17 September 1942	21 March 1943	20 September 1943	10 December 1946	Sold for scrap, 27 November 1973
Owen	DD-536	Bethlehem Shipbuilding Corporation, San Francisco, California	17 September 1942	21 March 1943	17 August 1951	27 May 1958	Sold for scrap, 27 November 1973
The Sullivans	DD-537	Bethlehem Shipbuilding Corporation, San Francisco, California	10 October 1942	4 April 1943	30 September 1943	10 January 1946	Donated to Buffalo and Erie County Naval & Military Park, Buffalo, New York
The Sullivans	DD-537	Bethlehem Shipbuilding Corporation, San Francisco, California	10 October 1942	4 April 1943	6 July 1951	7 January 1965	Donated to Buffalo and Erie County Naval & Military Park, Buffalo, New York
Stephen Potter	DD-538	Bethlehem Shipbuilding Corporation, San Francisco, California	27 October 1942	28 April 1943	21 October 1943	21 September 1945	Sold for scrap, 27 November 1973
Stephen Potter	DD-538	Bethlehem Shipbuilding Corporation, San Francisco, California	27 October 1942	28 April 1943	29 March 1951	21 April 1958	Sold for scrap, 27 November 1973
Tingey	DD-539	Bethlehem Shipbuilding Corporation, San Francisco, California	22 October 1942	28 May 1943	25 November 1943	March 1946	Sunk as target, May 1966
Tingey	DD-539	Bethlehem Shipbuilding Corporation, San Francisco, California	22 October 1942	28 May 1943	27 January 1951	30 November 1963	Sunk as target, May 1966
Twining	DD-540	Bethlehem Shipbuilding Corporation, San Francisco, California	20 November 1942	11 July 1943	1 December 1943	14 June 1946	Sold to Taiwan, 16 August 1971
Twining	DD-540	Bethlehem Shipbuilding Corporation, San Francisco, California	20 November 1942	11 July 1943	10 June 1950	1 July 1971	Sold to Taiwan, 16 August 1971
Yarnall	DD-541	Bethlehem Shipbuilding Corporation, San Francisco, California	5 December 1942	25 July 1943	30 December 1943	15 January 1947	Loaned to Taiwan, 10 June 1968
Yarnall	DD-541	Bethlehem Shipbuilding Corporation, San Francisco, California	5 December 1942	25 July 1943	28 February 1951	30 September 1958	Loaned to Taiwan, 10 June 1968
Boyd	DD-544	Bethlehem Steel Company, San Pedro, California, Terminal Island	2 April 1942	29 October 1942	8 May 1943	15 January 1947	Transferred to Turkey, 1 October 1969
Boyd	DD-544	Bethlehem Steel Company, San Pedro, California, Terminal Island	2 April 1942	29 October 1942	24 November 1950	1 October 1969	Transferred to Turkey, 1 October 1969
Bradford	DD-545	Bethlehem Steel Company, San Pedro, California, Terminal Island	28 April 1942	12 December 1942	12 June 1943	11 July 1946	Transferred to Hellenic Navy, 27 September 1962
Bradford	DD-545	Bethlehem Steel Company, San Pedro, California, Terminal Island	28 April 1942	12 December 1942	27 October 1950	28 September 1961	Transferred to Hellenic Navy, 27 September 1962
Brown	DD-546	Bethlehem Steel Company, San Pedro, California, Terminal Island	27 June 1942	21 February 1943	10 July 1943	1 August 1946	Transferred to Hellenic Navy, 27 September 1962
Brown	DD-546	Bethlehem Steel Company, San Pedro, California, Terminal Island	27 June 1942	21 February 1943	27 October 1950	9 February 1962	Transferred to Hellenic Navy, 27 September 1962
Cowell	DD-547	Bethlehem Steel Company, San Pedro, California, Terminal Island	7 September 1942	18 March 1943	23 August 1943	22 July 1946	Transferred to Argentina, 17 August 1971
Cowell	DD-547	Bethlehem Steel Company, San Pedro, California, Terminal Island	7 September 1942	18 March 1943	21 September 1951	17 August 1971	Transferred to Argentina, 17 August 1971
Capps	DD-550	Gulf Shipbuilding Corporation, Chickasaw, Alabama	12 June 1941	31 May 1942	23 June 1943	15 January 1947	Transferred to Spain, 15 May 1957
David W. Taylor	DD-551	Gulf Shipbuilding Corporation, Chickasaw, Alabama	12 June 1941	4 July 1942	18 September 1943	17 August 1946	Leased to Spain, 15 May 1957
Evans	DD-552	Gulf Shipbuilding Corporation, Chickasaw, Alabama	21 July 1941	4 October 1942	11 December 1943	7 November 1945	Sold for scrap, 11 February 1947
John D. Henley	DD-553	Gulf Shipbuilding Corporation, Chickasaw, Alabama	21 July 1941	15 November 1942	2 February 1944	30 April 1946	Sold for scrap, May 1970
Franks	DD-554	Seattle-Tacoma Shipbuilding Corporation, Seattle, Washington	8 March 1942	7 December 1942	30 July 1943	31 May 1946	Sold for scrap, 1 August 1973
Haggard	DD-555	Seattle-Tacoma Shipbuilding Corporation, Seattle, Washington	27 March 1942	9 February 1943	31 August 1943	1 November 1945	Sold for scrap, 3 March 1946
Hailey	DD-556	Seattle-Tacoma Shipbuilding Corporation, Seattle, Washington	11 April 1942	9 March 1943	30 September 1943	27 January 1946	Loaned to Brazil, 20 July 1961
Hailey	DD-556	Seattle-Tacoma Shipbuilding Corporation, Seattle, Washington	11 April 1942	9 March 1943	27 April 1951	3 November 1960	Loaned to Brazil, 20 July 1961
Johnston	DD-557	Seattle-Tacoma Shipbuilding Corporation, Seattle, Washington	6 May 1942	25 March 1943	27 October 1943	—N/a	Sunk, Battle off Samar 25 October 1944
Laws	DD-558	Seattle-Tacoma Shipbuilding Corporation, Seattle, Washington	19 May 1942	22 April 1943	18 November 1943	10 December 1946	Sold for scrap, 3 December 1973
Laws	DD-558	Seattle-Tacoma Shipbuilding Corporation, Seattle, Washington	19 May 1942	22 April 1943	2 November 1951	30 March 1964	Sold for scrap, 3 December 1973
Longshaw	DD-559	Seattle-Tacoma Shipbuilding Corporation, Seattle, Washington	16 June 1942	4 June 1943	4 December 1943	—N/a	Ran aground, 18 May 1945
Morrison	DD-560	Seattle-Tacoma Shipbuilding Corporation, Seattle, Washington	30 June 1942	4 July 1943	18 December 1943	—N/a	Sunk, 4 May 1945
Prichett	DD-561	Seattle-Tacoma Shipbuilding Corporation, Seattle, Washington	20 July 1942	31 July 1943	15 January 1944	14 March 1946	Transferred to Italy, 17 January 1970
Prichett	DD-561	Seattle-Tacoma Shipbuilding Corporation, Seattle, Washington	20 July 1942	31 July 1943	17 August 1951	10 January 1970	Transferred to Italy, 17 January 1970
Robinson	DD-562	Seattle-Tacoma Shipbuilding Corporation, Seattle, Washington	12 August 1942	28 August 1943	31 January 1944	12 June 1946	Sunk as target, 13 April 1982
Robinson	DD-562	Seattle-Tacoma Shipbuilding Corporation, Seattle, Washington	12 August 1942	28 August 1943	3 August 1951	1 April 1964	Sunk as target, 13 April 1982
Ross	DD-563	Seattle-Tacoma Shipbuilding Corporation, Seattle, Washington	7 September 1942	10 September 1943	21 February 1944	4 June 1946	Sunk as a target, 26 January 1978
Ross	DD-563	Seattle-Tacoma Shipbuilding Corporation, Seattle, Washington	7 September 1942	10 September 1943	27 October 1951	6 November 1959	Sunk as a target, 26 January 1978
Rowe	DD-564	Seattle-Tacoma Shipbuilding Corporation, Seattle, Washington	7 December 1942	30 September 1943	13 March 1944	31 January 1947	Sunk as a target, 23 February 1978
Rowe	DD-564	Seattle-Tacoma Shipbuilding Corporation, Seattle, Washington	7 December 1942	30 September 1943	5 October 1951	6 November 1959	Sunk as a target, 23 February 1978
Smalley	DD-565	Seattle-Tacoma Shipbuilding Corporation, Seattle, Washington	14 February 1943	27 October 1943	31 March 1944	18 July 1946	Sold for scrap, 4 January 1966
Smalley	DD-565	Seattle-Tacoma Shipbuilding Corporation, Seattle, Washington	14 February 1943	27 October 1943	3 July 1951	30 September 1957	Sold for scrap, 4 January 1966
Stoddard	DD-566	Seattle-Tacoma Shipbuilding Corporation, Seattle, Washington	10 March 1943	19 November 1943	15 April 1944	8 July 1946	Sunk in an exercise, 22 July 1997
Stoddard	DD-566	Seattle-Tacoma Shipbuilding Corporation, Seattle, Washington	10 March 1943	19 November 1943	9 March 1951	26 September 1969	Sunk in an exercise, 22 July 1997
Watts	DD-567	Seattle-Tacoma Shipbuilding Corporation, Seattle, Washington	26 March 1943	31 December 1943	29 April 1944	12 April 1946	Sold for scrap, 5 September 1974
Watts	DD-567	Seattle-Tacoma Shipbuilding Corporation, Seattle, Washington	26 March 1943	31 December 1943	6 July 1951	26 September 1969	Sold for scrap, 5 September 1974
Wren	DD-568	Seattle-Tacoma Shipbuilding Corporation, Seattle, Washington	24 April 1943	29 January 1944	20 May 1944	13 July 1946	Sold for scrap, 22 October 1975
Wren	DD-568	Seattle-Tacoma Shipbuilding Corporation, Seattle, Washington	24 April 1943	29 January 1944	7 September 1951	30 December 1963	Sold for scrap, 22 October 1975
Aulick	DD-569	Consolidated Steel Corporation, Orange, Texas	14 May 1941	2 March 1942	27 October 1942	18 April 1946	Transferred to Hellenic Navy, 21 August 1959
Charles Ausburne	DD-570	Consolidated Steel Corporation, Orange, Texas	14 May 1941	16 March 1942	24 November 1942	18 April 1946	Transferred to West Germany, 12 April 1960
Claxton	DD-571	Consolidated Steel Corporation, Orange, Texas	25 June 1941	1 April 1942	8 December 1942	18 April 1946	Transferred to West Germany, 16 December 1959
Dyson	DD-572	Consolidated Steel Corporation, Orange, Texas	25 June 1941	15 April 1942	30 December 1942	31 March 1947	Transferred to West Germany, 17 February 1960
Harrison	DD-573	Consolidated Steel Corporation, Orange, Texas	25 June 1941	4 May 1942	25 January 1943	1 April 1946	Sold to Mexico, 19 Aug 1970
John Rodgers	DD-574	Consolidated Steel Corporation, Orange, Texas	25 July 1941	7 May 1942	9 February 1943	25 May 1946	Transferred to Mexico, 19 Aug 1970
McKee	DD-575	Consolidated Steel Corporation, Orange, Texas	2 March 1942	2 August 1942	31 March 1943	25 February 1946	Sold for scrap, 2 January 1974
Murray	DD-576	Consolidated Steel Corporation, Orange, Texas	16 March 1942	16 August 1942	20 April 1943	27 March 1946	Sold for scrap, 16 August 1966
Murray	DD-576	Consolidated Steel Corporation, Orange, Texas	16 March 1942	16 August 1942	16 October 1951	1 June 1965	Sold for scrap, 16 August 1966
Sproston	DD-577	Consolidated Steel Corporation, Orange, Texas	1 April 1942	31 August 1942	19 May 1943	18 January 1946	Sold for scrap, 15 September 1971
Sproston	DD-577	Consolidated Steel Corporation, Orange, Texas	1 April 1942	31 August 1942	15 September 1950	30 September 1968	Sold for scrap, 15 September 1971
Wickes	DD-578	Consolidated Steel Corporation, Orange, Texas	15 April 1942	13 September 1942	16 June 1943	20 December 1945	Sunk as target 8 April 1974
William D. Porter	DD-579	Consolidated Steel Corporation, Orange, Texas	7 May 1942	27 September 1942	6 July 1943	—N/a	Sunk, 10 June 1945
Young	DD-580	Consolidated Steel Corporation, Orange, Texas	7 May 1942	15 October 1942	31 July 1943	January 1947	Sunk as a target, 6 March 1970
Charrette	DD-581	Boston Navy Yard	20 February 1942	3 June 1942	18 May 1943	15 January 1947	Transferred to Hellenic Navy, 16 June 1959
Conner	DD-582	Boston Navy Yard	6 April 1942	18 July 1942	8 June 1943	5 July 1946	Transferred to Hellenic Navy, 15 September 1959
Hall	DD-583	Boston Navy Yard	16 April 1942	18 July 1942	6 July 1943	10 December 1946	Transferred to Hellenic Navy, 9 February 1960
Halligan	DD-584	Boston Navy Yard	9 November 1942	19 March 1943	19 August 1943	—N/a	Lost to mine, 26 March 1945
Haraden	DD-585	Boston Navy Yard	9 November 1942	19 March 1943	16 September 1943	2 July 1946	Sunk as a target, November 1973
Newcomb	DD-586	Boston Navy Yard	19 March 1943	4 July 1943	10 November 1943	20 November 1945	Scrapped, October 1947
Bell	DD-587	Charleston Navy Yard	30 December 1941	24 June 1942	4 March 1943	14 June 1946	Sunk as target, 11 May 1975
Burns	DD-588	Charleston Navy Yard	9 May 1942	8 August 1942	3 April 1943	25 June 1946	Sunk as a target, 20 June 1974
Izard	DD-589	Charleston Navy Yard	9 May 1942	8 August 1942	15 May 1943	31 May 1946	Sold for scrap, 2 April 1970
Paul Hamilton	DD-590	Charleston Navy Yard	20 January 1943	7 April 1943	25 October 1943	24 September 1945	Sold for scrap, 2 April 1970
Twiggs	DD-591	Charleston Navy Yard	20 January 1943	7 April 1943	4 November 1943	—N/a	Sunk, 16 June 1945
Howorth	DD-592	Puget Sound Naval Shipyard	26 November 1941	10 January 1943	3 April 1944	30 April 1946	Sunk as target, 8 March 1962
Killen	DD-593	Puget Sound Naval Shipyard	26 November 1941	10 January 1943	4 May 1944	9 July 1946	Sunk as a target, 15 April 1975
Hart	DD-594	Puget Sound Naval Shipyard	10 August 1943	25 September 1944	4 November 1944	31 May 1946	Sold for scrap, 3 December 1973
Metcalf	DD-595	Puget Sound Naval Shipyard	10 August 1943	25 September 1944	18 November 1944	March 1946	Sold for scrap, 6 June 1972
Shields	DD-596	Puget Sound Naval Shipyard	10 August 1943	25 September 1944	8 February 1945	14 June 1946	Transferred to Brazil, 1 July 1972
Shields	DD-596	Puget Sound Naval Shipyard	10 August 1943	25 September 1944	15 July 1950	1 July 1972	Transferred to Brazil, 1 July 1972
Wiley	DD-597	Puget Sound Naval Shipyard	10 August 1943	25 September 1944	22 February 1945	15 May 1946	Sold for scrap, 2 April 1970
Abbot	DD-629	Bath Iron Works, Bath, Maine	21 September 1942	17 February 1943	23 April 1943	21 May 1946	Sold for scrap, 31 July 1975
Abbot	DD-629	Bath Iron Works, Bath, Maine	21 September 1942	17 February 1943	26 February 1951	26 March 1965	Sold for scrap, 31 July 1975
Braine	DD-630	Bath Iron Works, Bath, Maine	12 October 1942	7 March 1943	11 May 1943	26 July 1946	Transferred to Argentina, 17 August 1971
Braine	DD-630	Bath Iron Works, Bath, Maine	12 October 1942	7 March 1943	6 April 1951	17 August 1971	Transferred to Argentina, 17 August 1971
Erben	DD-631	Bath Iron Works, Bath, Maine	28 October 1942	21 March 1943	28 May 1943	31 May 1946	Transferred to South Korea, 16 May 1963
Erben	DD-631	Bath Iron Works, Bath, Maine	28 October 1942	21 March 1943	19 May 1951	27 June 1958	Transferred to South Korea, 16 May 1963
Hale	DD-642	Bath Iron Works, Bath, Maine	23 November 1942	4 April 1943	15 June 1943	15 January 1947	Transferred to Colombia, 23 January 1961
Hale	DD-642	Bath Iron Works, Bath, Maine	23 November 1942	4 April 1943	24 March 1951	30 July 1960	Transferred to Colombia, 23 January 1961
Sigourney	DD-643	Bath Iron Works, Bath, Maine	7 December 1942	24 April 1943	29 June 1943	20 March 1946	Sold for scrap, 31 July 1975
Sigourney	DD-643	Bath Iron Works, Bath, Maine	7 December 1942	24 April 1943	7 September 1951	1 May 1960	Sold for scrap, 31 July 1975
Stembel	DD-644	Bath Iron Works, Bath, Maine	21 December 1942	8 May 1943	16 July 1943	31 May 1946	Loaned to Argentina, 7 August 1961
Stembel	DD-644	Bath Iron Works, Bath, Maine	21 December 1942	8 May 1943	9 November 1951	27 May 1958	Loaned to Argentina, 7 August 1961
Albert W. Grant	DD-649	Charleston Navy Yard	30 December 1942	29 May 1943	24 November 1943	16 July 1946	Sold for scrap, 30 May 1972
Caperton	DD-650	Bath Iron Works, Bath, Maine	11 January 1943	22 May 1943	30 July 1943	6 July 1946	Sunk as a target in the 1980s
Caperton	DD-650	Bath Iron Works, Bath, Maine	11 January 1943	22 May 1943	6 April 1951	27 April 1960	Sunk as a target in the 1980s
Cogswell	DD-651	Bath Iron Works, Bath, Maine	1 February 1943	5 June 1943	17 August 1943	30 April 1946	Transferred to Turkey, 1 October 1969
Cogswell	DD-651	Bath Iron Works, Bath, Maine	1 February 1943	5 June 1943	7 January 1951	1 October 1969	Transferred to Turkey, 1 October 1969
Ingersoll	DD-652	Bath Iron Works, Bath, Maine	18 February 1943	28 June 1943	31 August 1943	19 July 1946	Sunk as a target, 19 May 1974
Ingersoll	DD-652	Bath Iron Works, Bath, Maine	18 February 1943	28 June 1943	4 May 1951	20 January 1970	Sunk as a target, 19 May 1974
Knapp	DD-653	Bath Iron Works, Bath, Maine	8 March 1943	10 July 1943	16 September 1943	5 July 1946	Sold for scrap, 27 August 1973
Knapp	DD-653	Bath Iron Works, Bath, Maine	8 March 1943	10 July 1943	3 May 1951	4 March 1957	Sold for scrap, 27 August 1973
Bearss	DD-654	Gulf Shipbuilding Corporation, Chickasaw, Alabama	14 July 1942	25 July 1943	12 April 1944	31 January 1947	Sold for scrap, 14 April 1976
Bearss	DD-654	Gulf Shipbuilding Corporation, Chickasaw, Alabama	14 July 1942	25 July 1943	7 September 1951	30 December 1963	Sold for scrap, 14 April 1976
John Hood	DD-655	Gulf Shipbuilding Corporation, Chickasaw, Alabama	12 October 1942	25 October 1943	7 June 1944	3 July 1946	Sold for scrap, 12 April 1976
John Hood	DD-655	Gulf Shipbuilding Corporation, Chickasaw, Alabama	12 October 1942	25 October 1943	3 August 1951	30 June 1964	Sold for scrap, 12 April 1976
Van Valkenburgh	DD-656	Gulf Shipbuilding Corporation, Chickasaw, Alabama	15 November 1942	19 December 1943	2 August 1944	12 April 1946	Transferred to Turkey, 28 February 1967
Van Valkenburgh	DD-656	Gulf Shipbuilding Corporation, Chickasaw, Alabama	15 November 1942	19 December 1943	8 March 1951	26 February 1954	Transferred to Turkey, 28 February 1967
Charles J. Badger	DD-657	Bethlehem Steel Corporation, Staten Island, New York	24 September 1942	3 April 1943	23 July 1943	21 May 1946	Sold to Chile for parts, 10 May 1974
Charles J. Badger	DD-657	Bethlehem Steel Corporation, Staten Island, New York	24 September 1942	3 April 1943	10 September 1951	20 December 1957	Sold to Chile for parts, 10 May 1974
Colahan	DD-658	Bethlehem Steel Corporation, Staten Island, New York	24 October 1942	3 May 1943	23 August 1943	14 June 1946	Sunk as a target, 18 December 1966
Colahan	DD-658	Bethlehem Steel Corporation, Staten Island, New York	24 October 1942	3 May 1943	16 December 1950	1 August 1966	Sunk as a target, 18 December 1966
Dashiell	DD-659	Federal Shipbuilding and Drydock Company, Kearny, New Jersey	1 October 1942	6 February 1943	20 March 1943	30 March 1946	Sold for scrap, 21 September 1975
Dashiell	DD-659	Federal Shipbuilding and Drydock Company, Kearny, New Jersey	1 October 1942	6 February 1943	3 May 1951	29 April 1960	Sold for scrap, 21 September 1975
Bullard	DD-660	Federal Shipbuilding and Drydock Company, Kearny, New Jersey	16 October 1942	28 February 1943	9 April 1943	20 December 1946	Sold for scrap, 3 December 1973
Kidd	DD-661	Federal Shipbuilding and Drydock Company, Kearny, New Jersey	16 October 1942	28 February 1943	23 April 1943	10 December 1946	Museum ship
Kidd	DD-661	Federal Shipbuilding and Drydock Company, Kearny, New Jersey	16 October 1942	28 February 1943	28 March 1951	19 June 1964	Museum ship
Bennion	DD-662	Boston Navy Yard	19 March 1943	4 July 1943	14 December 1943	20 June 1946	Sold for scrap, 30 May 1973
Heywood L. Edwards	DD-663	Boston Navy Yard	4 July 1943	6 October 1943	26 January 1944	1 July 1946	Transferred to Japan, 10 March 1959
Richard P. Leary	DD-664	Boston Navy Yard	4 July 1943	6 October 1943	23 February 1944	10 December 1946	Transferred to Japan, 10 March 1959
Bryant	DD-665	Charleston Navy Yard	30 December 1942	29 May 1943	4 December 1943	15 January 1947	Sunk as a target, 24 August 1969
Black	DD-666	Federal Shipbuilding and Drydock Company, Kearny, New Jersey	14 November 1942	28 March 1943	21 May 1943	5 August 1946	Sold for scrap, 17 February 1971
Black	DD-666	Federal Shipbuilding and Drydock Company, Kearny, New Jersey	14 November 1942	28 March 1943	18 July 1951	26 September 1969	Sold for scrap, 17 February 1971
Chauncey	DD-667	Federal Shipbuilding and Drydock Company, Kearny, New Jersey	14 November 1942	28 March 1943	31 May 1943	19 December 1945	Sold for scrap, 2 January 1974
Chauncey	DD-667	Federal Shipbuilding and Drydock Company, Kearny, New Jersey	14 November 1942	28 March 1943	18 July 1950	14 May 1954	Sold for scrap, 2 January 1974
Clarence K. Bronson	DD-668	Federal Shipbuilding and Drydock Company, Kearny, New Jersey	9 December 1942	18 April 1943	11 June 1943	16 July 1946	Transferred to Turkey, 14 January 1967
Clarence K. Bronson	DD-668	Federal Shipbuilding and Drydock Company, Kearny, New Jersey	9 December 1942	18 April 1943	7 June 1951	29 June 1960	Transferred to Turkey, 14 January 1967
Cotten	DD-669	Federal Shipbuilding and Drydock Company, Kearny, New Jersey	8 February 1943	12 June 1943	24 July 1943	15 July 1946	Sold for scrap, 31 July 1975
Cotten	DD-669	Federal Shipbuilding and Drydock Company, Kearny, New Jersey	8 February 1943	12 June 1943	3 July 1951	2 May 1960	Sold for scrap, 31 July 1975
Dortch	DD-670	Federal Shipbuilding and Drydock Company, Kearny, New Jersey	2 March 1943	20 June 1943	7 August 1943	19 July 1946	Transferred to Argentina, 1 August 1961
Dortch	DD-670	Federal Shipbuilding and Drydock Company, Kearny, New Jersey	2 March 1943	20 June 1943	4 May 1951	13 December 1957	Transferred to Argentina, 1 August 1961
Gatling	DD-671	Federal Shipbuilding and Drydock Company, Kearny, New Jersey	3 March 1943	20 June 1943	19 August 1943	16 July 1946	Sold for scrap, 22 February 1977
Gatling	DD-671	Federal Shipbuilding and Drydock Company, Kearny, New Jersey	3 March 1943	20 June 1943	4 June 1951	2 May 1960	Sold for scrap, 22 February 1977
Healy	DD-672	Federal Shipbuilding and Drydock Company, Kearny, New Jersey	4 March 1943	4 July 1943	3 September 1943	11 July 1946	Sold for scrap, 12 April 1976
Healy	DD-672	Federal Shipbuilding and Drydock Company, Kearny, New Jersey	4 March 1943	4 July 1943	3 August 1951	11 March 1958	Sold for scrap, 12 April 1976
Hickox	DD-673	Federal Shipbuilding and Drydock Company, Kearny, New Jersey	12 March 1943	4 July 1943	10 September 1943	10 December 1946	Transferred to South Korea, 15 November 1968
Hickox	DD-673	Federal Shipbuilding and Drydock Company, Kearny, New Jersey	12 March 1943	4 July 1943	19 May 1951	20 December 1957	Transferred to South Korea, 15 November 1968
Hunt	DD-674	Federal Shipbuilding and Drydock Company, Kearny, New Jersey	31 March 1943	1 August 1943	22 September 1943	15 December 1945	Sold for scrap, 14 August 1975
Hunt	DD-674	Federal Shipbuilding and Drydock Company, Kearny, New Jersey	31 March 1943	1 August 1943	31 October 1951	30 December 1963	Sold for scrap, 14 August 1975
Lewis Hancock	DD-675	Federal Shipbuilding and Drydock Company, Kearny, New Jersey	31 March 1943	1 August 1943	29 September 1943	10 January 1946	Transferred to Brazil, 1 August 1967
Lewis Hancock	DD-675	Federal Shipbuilding and Drydock Company, Kearny, New Jersey	31 March 1943	1 August 1943	19 May 1951	18 December 1957	Transferred to Brazil, 1 August 1967
Marshall	DD-676	Federal Shipbuilding and Drydock Company, Kearny, New Jersey	29 April 1943	29 August 1943	16 October 1943	December 1945	Sold for scrap, July 1970
Marshall	DD-676	Federal Shipbuilding and Drydock Company, Kearny, New Jersey	29 April 1943	29 August 1943	27 April 1951	19 July 1969	Sold for scrap, July 1970
McDermut	DD-677	Federal Shipbuilding and Drydock Company, Kearny, New Jersey	14 June 1943	17 October 1943	19 November 1943	15 January 1947	Sold for scrap, 4 January 1966
McDermut	DD-677	Federal Shipbuilding and Drydock Company, Kearny, New Jersey	14 June 1943	17 October 1943	29 December 1950	16 December 1963	Sold for scrap, 4 January 1966
McGowan	DD-678	Federal Shipbuilding and Drydock Company, Kearny, New Jersey	30 June 1943	14 November 1943	20 December 1943	30 April 1946	Transferred to Spain, 1 December 1960
McGowan	DD-678	Federal Shipbuilding and Drydock Company, Kearny, New Jersey	30 June 1943	14 November 1943	6 July 1951	30 November 1960	Transferred to Spain, 1 December 1960
McNair	DD-679	Federal Shipbuilding and Drydock Company, Kearny, New Jersey	30 June 1943	14 November 1943	30 December 1943	28 May 1946	Sold for scrap, 10 June 1976
McNair	DD-679	Federal Shipbuilding and Drydock Company, Kearny, New Jersey	30 June 1943	14 November 1943	6 July 1951	30 December 1963	Sold for scrap, 10 June 1976
Melvin	DD-680	Federal Shipbuilding and Drydock Company, Kearny, New Jersey	6 July 1943	17 October 1943	24 November 1943	31 May 1946	Sold for scrap, 14 August 1975
Melvin	DD-680	Federal Shipbuilding and Drydock Company, Kearny, New Jersey	6 July 1943	17 October 1943	26 February 1951	13 January 1954	Sold for scrap, 14 August 1975
Hopewell	DD-681	Bethlehem Steel Company, San Pedro, California, Terminal Island	29 October 1942	2 May 1943	30 September 1943	15 January 1947	Sunk as target, 11 February 1972
Hopewell	DD-681	Bethlehem Steel Company, San Pedro, California, Terminal Island	29 October 1942	2 May 1943	28 March 1951	2 January 1970	Sunk as target, 11 February 1972
Porterfield	DD-682	Bethlehem Steel Company, San Pedro, California, Terminal Island	12 December 1942	13 June 1943	30 October 1943	15 July 1946	Sunk as a target, 18 July 1982
Porterfield	DD-682	Bethlehem Steel Company, San Pedro, California, Terminal Island	12 December 1942	13 June 1943	27 April 1951	7 November 1969	Sunk as a target, 18 July 1982
Stockham	DD-683	Bethlehem Shipbuilding Corporation, San Francisco, California	19 December 1942	25 June 1943	11 February 1944	30 August 1946	Sunk as target 17 February 1977
Stockham	DD-683	Bethlehem Shipbuilding Corporation, San Francisco, California	19 December 1942	25 June 1943	14 November 1951	2 September 1957	Sunk as target 17 February 1977
Wedderburn	DD-684	Bethlehem Shipbuilding Corporation, San Francisco, California	10 January 1943	1 August 1943	9 March 1944	April 4, 1946	Sold for scrap, 25 January 1972
Wedderburn	DD-684	Bethlehem Shipbuilding Corporation, San Francisco, California	10 January 1943	1 August 1943	21 November 1950	1 October 1969	Sold for scrap, 25 January 1972
Picking	DD-685	Bethlehem Steel Corporation, Staten Island, New York	24 November 1942	1 June 1943	21 September 1943	20 December 1945	Sunk as a target, 27 February 1997
Picking	DD-685	Bethlehem Steel Corporation, Staten Island, New York	24 November 1942	1 June 1943	26 January 1951	6 September 1969	Sunk as a target, 27 February 1997
Halsey Powell	DD-686	Bethlehem Steel Corporation, Staten Island, New York	3 February 1943	30 June 1943	25 October 1943	10 December 1946	Transferred to the Republic of Korea, 27 April 1968
Halsey Powell	DD-686	Bethlehem Steel Corporation, Staten Island, New York	3 February 1943	30 June 1943	27 April 1951	27 April 1968	Transferred to the Republic of Korea, 27 April 1968
Uhlmann	DD-687	Bethlehem Steel Corporation, Staten Island, New York	6 March 1943	30 July 1943	22 November 1943	14 June 1946	Sold for scrap, 21 March 1974
Uhlmann	DD-687	Bethlehem Steel Corporation, Staten Island, New York	6 March 1943	30 July 1943	23 May 1950	15 July 1972	Sold for scrap, 21 March 1974
Remey	DD-688	Bath Iron Works, Bath, Maine	22 March 1943	25 July 1943	30 September 1943	10 December 1946	Sold for scrap, 10 June 1976
Remey	DD-688	Bath Iron Works, Bath, Maine	22 March 1943	25 July 1943	14 November 1951	30 December 1963	Sold for scrap, 10 June 1976
Wadleigh	DD-689	Bath Iron Works, Bath, Maine	5 April 1943	7 August 1943	19 October 1943	20 June 1946	Transferred to Chile, 26 July 1972
Wadleigh	DD-689	Bath Iron Works, Bath, Maine	5 April 1943	7 August 1943	3 October 1951	28 June 1962	Transferred to Chile, 26 July 1972
Norman Scott	DD-690	Bath Iron Works, Bath, Maine	26 April 1943	28 August 1943	5 November 1943	30 April 1946	Sold for scrap, 3 December 1973
Mertz	DD-691	Bath Iron Works, Bath, Maine	10 May 1943	11 September 1943	19 November 1943	23 April 1946	Sold for scrap, 16 December 1971
Callaghan	DD-792	Bethlehem Steel Company, San Pedro, California, Terminal Island	21 February 1943	1 August 1943	27 November 1943	—N/a	Sunk, 28 July 1945
Cassin Young	DD-793	Bethlehem Steel Company, San Pedro, California, Terminal Island	18 March 1943	12 September 1943	31 December 1943	28 May 1946	Museum ship at the former Boston Navy Yard in Boston, Massachusetts
Cassin Young	DD-793	Bethlehem Steel Company, San Pedro, California, Terminal Island	18 March 1943	12 September 1943	8 September 1951	29 April 1960	Museum ship at the former Boston Navy Yard in Boston, Massachusetts
Irwin	DD-794	Bethlehem Steel Company, San Pedro, California, Terminal Island	2 May 1943	31 October 1943	14 February 1944	31 May 1946	Transferred to Brazil, 10 May 1968
Irwin	DD-794	Bethlehem Steel Company, San Pedro, California, Terminal Island	2 May 1943	31 October 1943	26 February 1951	10 January 1958	Transferred to Brazil, 10 May 1968
Preston	DD-795	Bethlehem Steel Company, San Pedro, California, Terminal Island	13 June 1943	12 December 1943	20 March 1944	24 April 1946	Transferred to Turkey, 15 November 1969
Preston	DD-795	Bethlehem Steel Company, San Pedro, California, Terminal Island	13 June 1943	12 December 1943	26 January 1951	15 November 1969	Transferred to Turkey, 15 November 1969
Benham	DD-796	Bethlehem Steel Corporation, Staten Island, New York	23 April 1943	30 August 1943	20 December 1943	18 October 1946	Loaned to Peru, 15 December 1960
Benham	DD-796	Bethlehem Steel Corporation, Staten Island, New York	23 April 1943	30 August 1943	24 March 1951	30 June 1960	Loaned to Peru, 15 December 1960
Cushing	DD-797	Bethlehem Steel Corporation, Staten Island, New York	3 May 1943	30 September 1943	17 January 1944	3 February 1947	Loaned to Brazil, 20 July 1961
Cushing	DD-797	Bethlehem Steel Corporation, Staten Island, New York	3 May 1943	30 September 1943	17 August 1951	8 November 1960	Loaned to Brazil, 20 July 1961
Monssen	DD-798	Bethlehem Steel Corporation, Staten Island, New York	1 June 1943	30 October 1943	14 February 1944	30 April 1946	Sold for scrap, 21 October 1963
Monssen	DD-798	Bethlehem Steel Corporation, Staten Island, New York	1 June 1943	30 October 1943	31 October 1951	September 1957 or 11 December 1957	Sold for scrap, 21 October 1963
Jarvis	DD-799	Seattle-Tacoma Shipbuilding Corporation, Seattle, Washington	7 June 1943	14 February 1944	3 June 1944	29 June 1946	Transferred to Spain, 3 November 1960
Jarvis	DD-799	Seattle-Tacoma Shipbuilding Corporation, Seattle, Washington	7 June 1943	14 February 1944	8 February 1951	24 October 1960	Transferred to Spain, 3 November 1960
Porter	DD-800	Seattle-Tacoma Shipbuilding Corporation, Seattle, Washington	6 July 1943	13 March 1944	24 June 1944	3 July 1946	Sold for scrap, 21 March 1974
Porter	DD-800	Seattle-Tacoma Shipbuilding Corporation, Seattle, Washington	6 July 1943	13 March 1944	9 February 1951	10 August 1953	Sold for scrap, 21 March 1974
Colhoun	DD-801	Seattle-Tacoma Shipbuilding Corporation, Seattle, Washington	3 August 1943	10 April 1944	8 July 1944	—N/a	Sunk, 6 April 1945
Gregory	DD-802	Seattle-Tacoma Shipbuilding Corporation, Seattle, Washington	31 August 1943	8 May 1944	29 July 1944	15 January 1947	Sunk as a target, 4 March 1971
Gregory	DD-802	Seattle-Tacoma Shipbuilding Corporation, Seattle, Washington	31 August 1943	8 May 1944	27 April 1951	1 February 1964	Sunk as a target, 4 March 1971
Little	DD-803	Seattle-Tacoma Shipbuilding Corporation, Seattle, Washington	13 September 1943	22 May 1944	19 August 1944	—N/a	Sunk, 3 May 1945
Rooks	DD-804	Seattle-Tacoma Shipbuilding Corporation, Seattle, Washington	27 October 1943	6 June 1944	2 September 1944	11 June 1946	Transferred to Chile, 26 July 1962
Rooks	DD-804	Seattle-Tacoma Shipbuilding Corporation, Seattle, Washington	27 October 1943	6 June 1944	19 May 1951	26 July 1962	Transferred to Chile, 26 July 1962
