= USS Smalley =

Fletcher-class destroyer

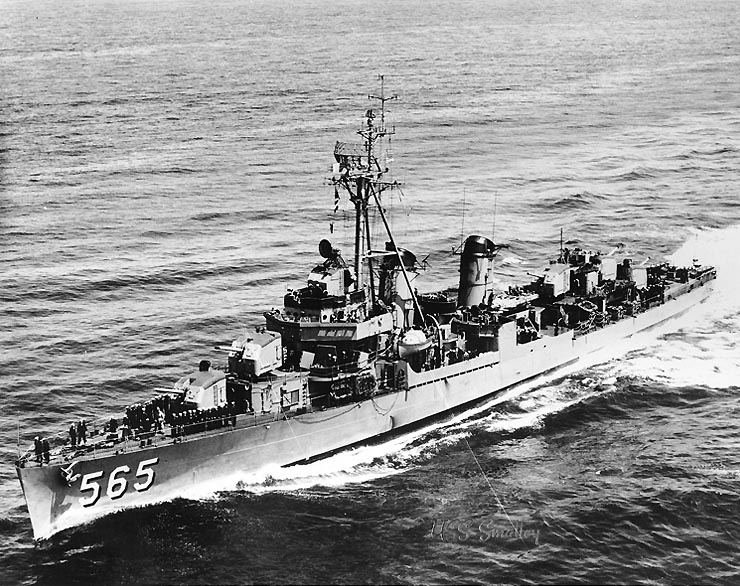
- USS Smalley (DD-565), underway, c. the mid-1950s

History

United States
- Namesake: Anthony A. Smalley
- Builder: Seattle-Tacoma Shipbuilding Corporation
- Laid down: 14 February 1943
- Launched: 27 October 1943
- Commissioned: 31 March 1944
- Decommissioned: 30 September 1957
- Stricken: 1 April 1965
- Fate: Sold for scrap, 4 January 1966

General characteristics
- Class & type: Fletcher-class destroyer
- Displacement: 2,050 tons
- Length: 376 ft 6 in (114.7 m)
- Beam: 39 ft 8 in (12.1 m)
- Draft: 17 ft 9 in (5.4 m)
- Propulsion: 60,000 shp (45 MW); 2 propellers
- Speed: 38 knots (70 km/h; 44 mph)
- Range: 6,500 nmi. (12,000 km); at 15 kt
- Complement: 319
- Armament: 5 × 5 in (130 mm), 10 × 40 mm AA guns, 7 × 20 mm AA guns, 10 × 21 inch (533 mm) torpedo tubes, 6 × depth charge projectors, 2 × depth charge tracks

USS Smalley (DD-565), was a Fletcher-class destroyer of the United States Navy.

== Namesake ==
Anthony A. Smalley was born in Massachusetts in 1836. He was commissioned Acting Master on 27 March 1862 for service during the American Civil War; but he subsequently became ill and his appointment was revoked on 1 September 1863. When his health permitted, Smalley applied for reinstatement, and he was commissioned Acting Ensign on 1 December 1863. He served in the North Atlantic Blockading Squadron on board USS Pequot and distinguished himself during the Second Battle of Fort Fisher. In the attack, Smalley was in command of an 18-man detachment from the Pequot which was responsible for digging trenches for the assault on the fort. He and his men also participated in the charge on the fort. Letters of commendation from his commanding officer praised his bravery and coolness while building the trenches under fire and while leading his men in the charge. Smalley was honorably discharged from the Navy on 3 August 1865. He died in Boston, Massachusetts on 24 January 1894.

== Construction and commissioning ==
Smalley was laid down on 14 February 1943 by the Seattle-Tacoma Shipbuilding Corporation, Seattle, Wash.; launched on 27 October 1943, sponsored by Miss Lina A. Mayo; and commissioned on 31 March 1944.

== History ==
Following shakedown, the ship and one destroyer got underway on 7 June 1944 to escort three troop transports to Hawaii. The convoy arrived at Pearl Harbor on 11 July 1944. On the 28th, the ship's complement manned the rail for President Franklin D. Roosevelt when he steamed into Pearl Harbor on board the cruiser USS Baltimore (CA-68).

On 8 August, Smalley sailed for the Aleutians. On 21 November 1944, the destroyer fired on buildings, tents, machine gun emplacements, and an airstrip on Matsuwa Island in the Japanese Kurils. In the bombardment, she fired 466 rounds. She later made three more similar bombardment missions during her Aleutian tour. On 18 April 1945, Smalley received orders back to Hawaii.

On 11 May, she joined USS Rowe (DD-564) and USS Stoddard (DD-566) in screening aircraft carrier USS Ticonderoga (CV-14) to Ulithi Atoll. A week later, planes from Ticonderoga struck Taroa Island. During this raid, Smalley rescued a crewman from a downed torpedo plane.

On 4 June 1945, Smalley arrived off Okinawa to help the Allied struggle for that bitterly contested island. Smalley was assigned close support radar picket duty. Her duty was twofold: antisubmarine patrolling and air defense of the transport area. Following this mission, she participated in the final assault on the Japanese home islands by offensive surface sweeps, control of Combat Air Patrol, reconnaissance missions, and shore bombardment. Her final shore bombardment occurred on 23 July 1945 when she shelled Chichi-jima.

Smalley returned to the United States in October 1945; and, a little over two years later, in January 1947, she was decommissioned. The ship was placed in the United States Atlantic Reserve Fleet at the Charleston Naval Shipyard.

The Korean War prompted the recommissioning of Smalley on 3 July 1951. After refresher training at Guantanamo Bay, Smalley sailed to Newport, R.I., arriving at her new homeport on 10 December 1951. Smalley spent all of 1952 on additional training coupled with maintenance and calibration of equipment; and, after a yard period in Boston in the spring of 1953, she sailed on 19 May for Korea. On 2 July, Smalley entered the Korean Combat Zone acting as plane guard for USS Princeton (CV-37). Smalley continued operating with TF 77 as the carriers of the force carried out the famous "Cherokee" strikes until the signing of the armistice on 27 July 1953.

Smalley remained in the former combat zone until early November. She performed such diverse tasks as ferrying 110 Marines from Sasebo, Japan, to Pusan, Korea, and assisting a South Korean fishing vessel in distress. In the latter case, she took on board the vessel's 29 men.

Smalley departed the Far East in November 1953 and returned to Newport on 15 January 1954. Her route homeward included calls at Hong Kong, Singapore, Ceylon, Saudi Arabia, Aden, Port Said, Piraeus, Cannes, and Gibraltar.

Smalley remained home ported in Newport, Rhode Island, until July 1955 when she got under-way for a northern Europe and a Mediterranean cruise. She visited England, Denmark, Finland, Scotland, Spain, France, and Turkey and worked with units of both the Danish and the British Fleets. Smalley sailed for home on 15 November and arrived in Newport on the 28th.

The year 1956 saw a cruise in Caribbean waters followed by a yard period. Then, in 1957, Smalley left Newport on what was to be her last operational assignment: a cruise with the Mideast Force showing the flag in ports along the eastern coast of Africa and along the shores of the Persian Gulf. En route to her new assignment, Smalley visited Sierra Leone, Cape Town, and Mombasa (Kenya) before arriving at Karachi, Pakistan, on 10 February. Following two return trips to Bahrain in the Persian Gulf, she departed the area in April and, after calling once again at Mombasa, Cape Town, Freetown, and Sierra Leone, Smalley returned home. On 12 June, Smalley went into dry dock at the Charleston Naval Shipyard; and, on 23 August 1957, Smalley departed her home port for the Philadelphia Naval Shipyard. She was decommissioned there and entered the United States Atlantic Reserve Fleet where she remained until she was struck from the Navy list on 1 April 1965 and sold to the Norfolk Shipbuilding and Drydock Corporation.

Smalley was awarded three battle stars for her World War II operations and one star for her Korean War service.
