= Fletcher-class destroyer =

1940s class of destroyers of the United States Navy

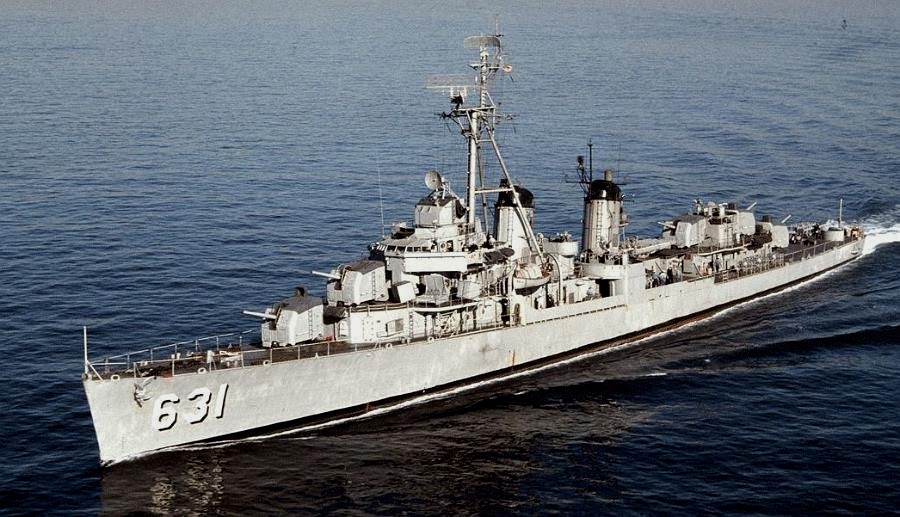
- USS Erben underway in the 1950s

Class overview
- Name: Fletcher class; 2100-ton destroyer
- Builders: Bethlehem; San Francisco, CA (18); Staten Island, NY (15); San Pedro, CA (10); Bath Iron Works, ME (31); Federal Shipbuilding, NJ (29); Seattle-Tacoma Shipbuilding, WA (21); Boston Navy Yard, MA (14); Consolidated Steel, TX (12); Charleston Navy Yard, SC (10); Puget Sound Navy Yard, WA (8); Gulf Shipbuilding, AL (7)
- Operators: United States Navy; Argentine Navy; Brazilian Navy; Chilean Navy; Colombian National Navy; Hellenic Navy; Italian Navy; Japan Maritime Self-Defense Force; Mexican Navy; Peruvian Navy; Republic of Korea Navy; Spanish Navy; Republic of China Navy; Turkish Navy; German Navy
- Preceded by: Gleaves class
- Succeeded by: Allen M. Sumner class
- Subclasses: (Japan) Ariake class; (West Germany) Zerstörer 1 class; (Italy) Fante class; (Spain) Lepanto class; (South Korea) Chungmu class; (Argentina) Brown class
- Cost: $6 million
- Built: 3 March 1941 to 22 February 1945
- In commission: 4 June 1942 to 1971 (USN), 2001 (Mexico)
- Completed: 175
- Cancelled: 9
- Lost: 19, plus 6 not repaired
- Preserved: 4; USS Cassin Young; USS The Sullivans; USS Kidd; Greek destroyer Velos

General characteristics
- Type: Destroyer
- Displacement: 2,050 tons (standard); 2,500 tons (full load)
- Length: 369.25 ft (112.55 m) wl, 376.5 ft (114.8 m) o/a
- Beam: 39.5 ft (12.0 m)
- Draft: 17.5 ft (5.3 m)
- Propulsion: 60,000 shp (45,000 kW); 4 oil-fired boilers; 2 geared steam turbines; 2 screws
- Speed: 36.5 knots (67.6 km/h; 42.0 mph)
- Range: 5,500 nmi (10,200 km; 6,300 mi) at 15 knots (28 km/h; 17 mph)
- Boats & landing craft carried: 2 × lifeboats
- Complement: 329 officers and enlisted
- Sensors & processing systems: Mk37 GFCS; SC surveillance radar; SG air-search radar
- Armament: Varied; see § Armament

The Fletcher class is a class of destroyers built by the United States during World War II. The class was designed in 1939 as a result of dissatisfaction with the earlier destroyer leader types of the Porter and Somers classes. Some went on to serve during the Korean War and into the Vietnam War.

The United States Navy (USN) commissioned 175 Fletcher-class destroyers between 1942 and 1944, more than any other destroyer class, and the design was generally regarded as highly successful. The Fletcher ships had a design speed of 38 knots (70 km/h; 44 mph) and a principal armament of five 5-inch (127 mm) guns in single mounts with 10 21-inch (530 mm) torpedo tubes in two quintuple centerline mounts. The Allen M. Sumner and Gearing classes were Fletcher derivatives.

The long-range Fletcher-class ships performed every task asked of a destroyer, from antisubmarine and antiaircraft warfare to surface action. They could cover the vast distances required by fleet actions in the Pacific and served almost exclusively in the Pacific Theater of Operations during World War II, during which they accounted for 29 Imperial Japanese Navy submarines sunk. In a massive effort, the Fletcher-class ships were built by shipyards across the United States, and after World War II ended, 11 were sold to countries that they had been built to fight against: Italy, Germany, and Japan, as well as other countries, where they had even longer, more distinguished careers. Three in the U.S. and one in Greece have been preserved as museum ships.

== Description ==
The Fletcher class (named for Admiral Frank F. Fletcher, Medal of Honor recipient) was the largest destroyer class ordered. It was also one of the most successful and popular with their crews. Compared to earlier classes built for the USN, the Fletcher ships carried a significant increase in lethal firepower, including antiaircraft (AA) weapons and increased armor plating; this contributed to greater displacement and overall weight and height increase. Their flush deck construction added structural strength, but it did make them cramped, as less crew space was available below decks compared with a raised forecastle.

== Design ==
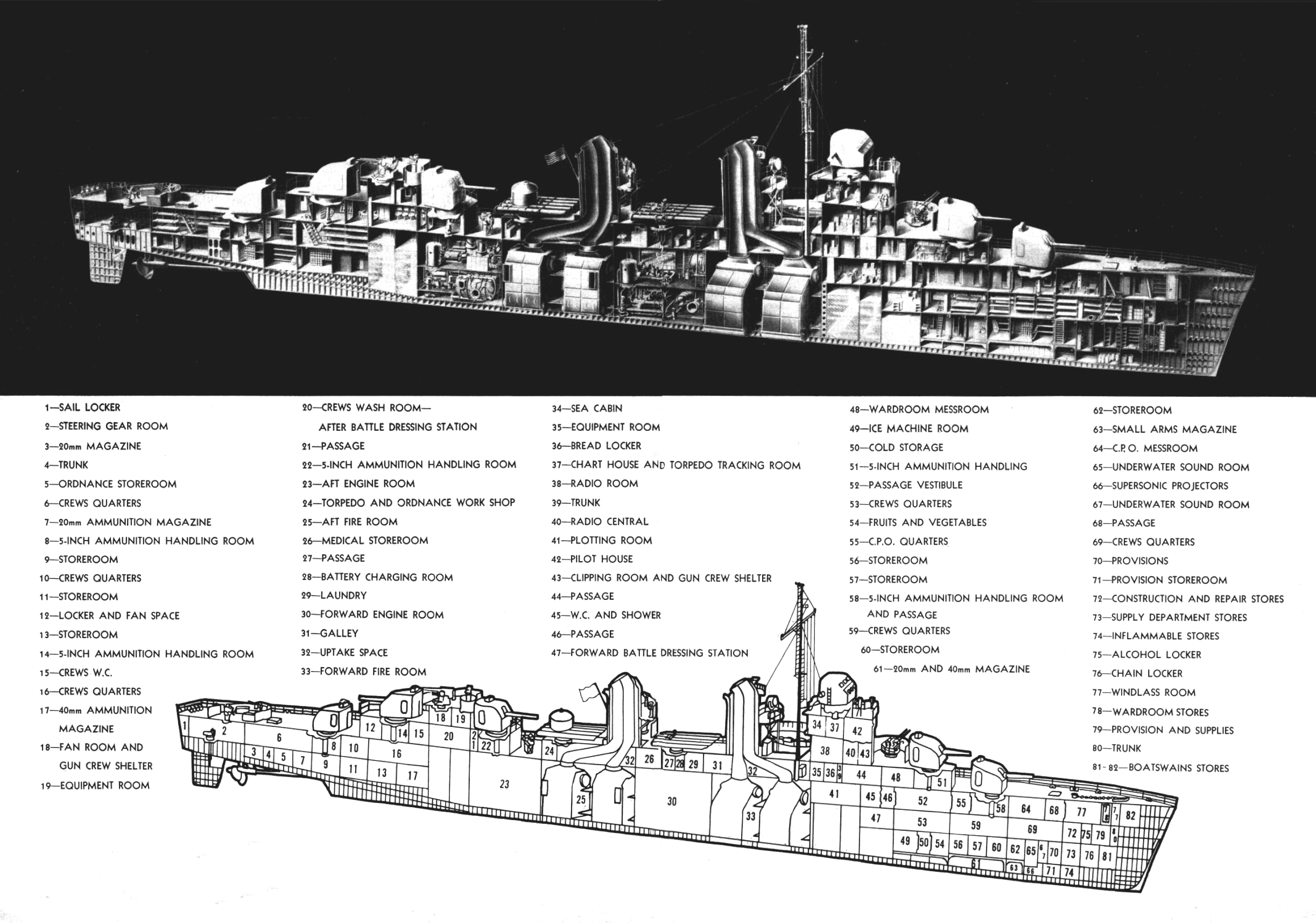
Technical drawing of the Fletcher-class destroyer

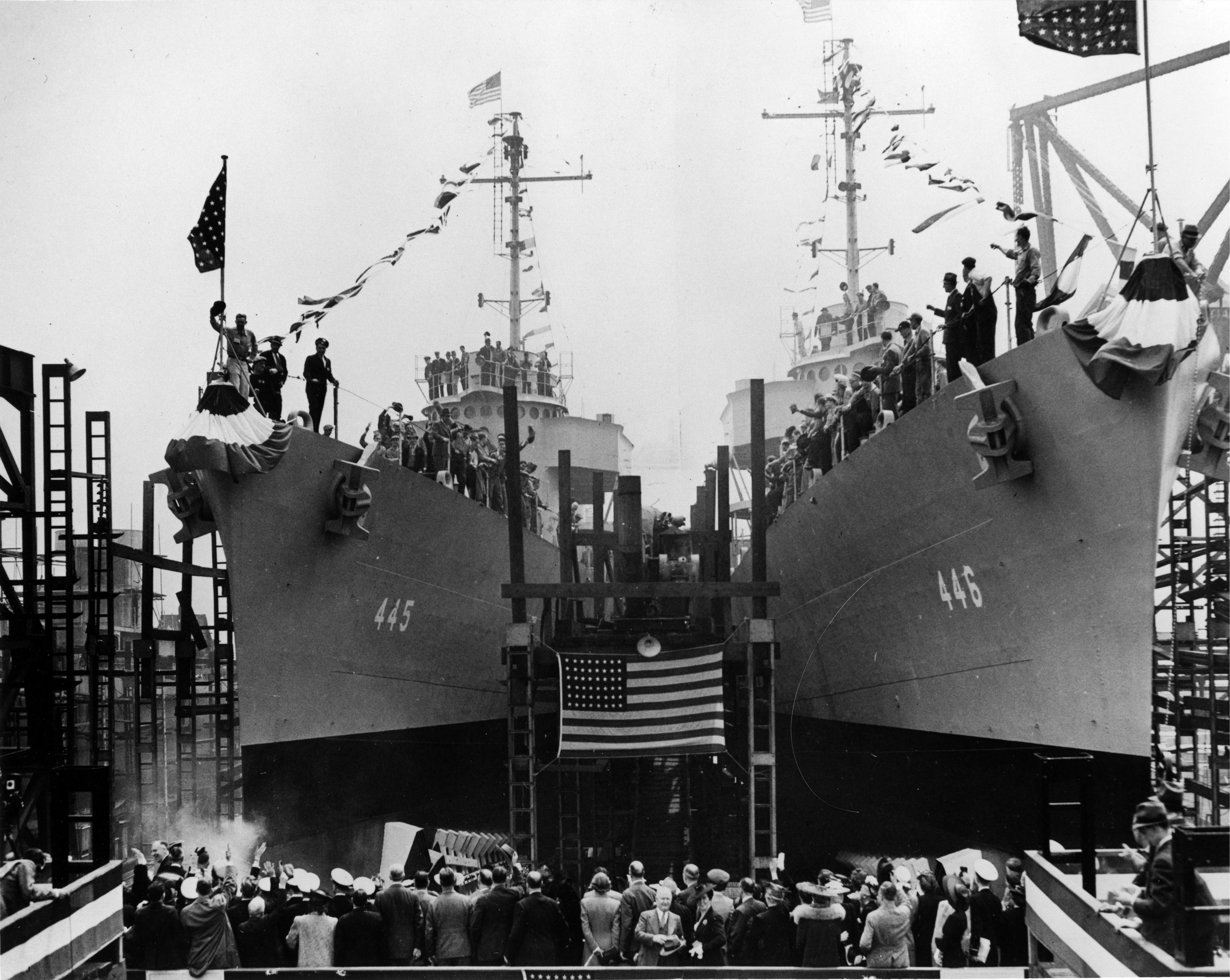
Launch of Fletcher and Radford, 3 May 1942

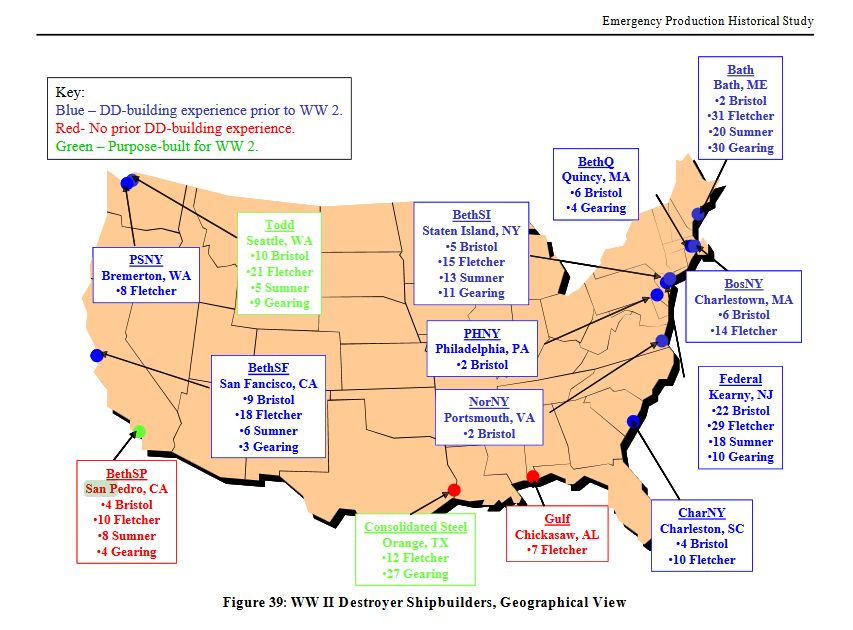
World War II Destroyer Shipbuilders map from Department of Defense (DoD)

The Fletcher class was the first generation of destroyers designed after the series of naval treaties that had limited ship designs heretofore. The growth in the design was in part a response to the challenge that had dogged USN designs in coping with long-range operations in the Pacific Ocean. They were also to carry no fewer than five 5 in (127 mm) guns and 10 deck-mounted torpedo tubes on the centerline, allowing them to meet any foreign design on equal terms. Compared to earlier designs, the Fletcher ships were large, allowing them to adapt to evolving defensive priorities through the addition of two quadruple 40 mm Bofors and six dual 20 mm Oerlikon AA guns. This addition to the AA suite required the deletion of the forward quintuple torpedo mount, a change done under the 4 April 1945 anti-kamikaze program.

The Fletcher class were not as top-heavy as the previous classes were, allowing them to take on additional equipment and weapons without major redesign. They were fortunate in catching American production at the right moment, becoming "the" destroyer design, with only the Fletcher-class derivatives, the Allen M. Sumner and Gearing classes, following it.

The first design inputs were in the fall of 1939 from questionnaires distributed around design bureaus and the Office of the Chief of Naval Operations. The design parameters were the armaments desired of the next destroyer. As such, the questions were of how many guns, torpedoes, and depth charges were seen as desirable. Also asked was at what point would the design grow large enough to become a torpedo target instead of a torpedo delivery system. The answer that came back was that five 5 in (127 mm) dual-purpose guns, 12 torpedoes, and 28 depth charges would be ideal, while a return to the 1,500-ton designs of the past was seen as undesirable. Speed requirements varied from 35 to 38 knots (65 to 70 km/h; 40 to 44 mph), and shortcomings in the earlier Sims class, which were top-heavy and needed lead ballast to correct this fault, caused the Fletcher design to be widened by 18 in (46 cm) of beam. As with other previous U.S. flush-deck destroyer designs, seagoing performance suffered. This was mitigated by deployment to the Pacific Ocean, which is relatively calm compared to the Atlantic.

To achieve 38 knots with a 500-ton increase in displacement, power was increased from 50,000 to 60,000 shp (37,000 to 45,000 kW) compared to the previous Benson and Gleaves classes. The Fletcher ships featured air-encased boilers producing steam at 600 psi (4,100 kPa) and 850 °F (450 °C), with two 350 kW steam turbine-driven electrical generators and a 100 kW emergency diesel generator. Typically, Babcock & Wilcox boilers and General Electric geared steam turbines were equipped, although other designs and manufacturers were probably used to maximize the rate of production.

== Armament ==
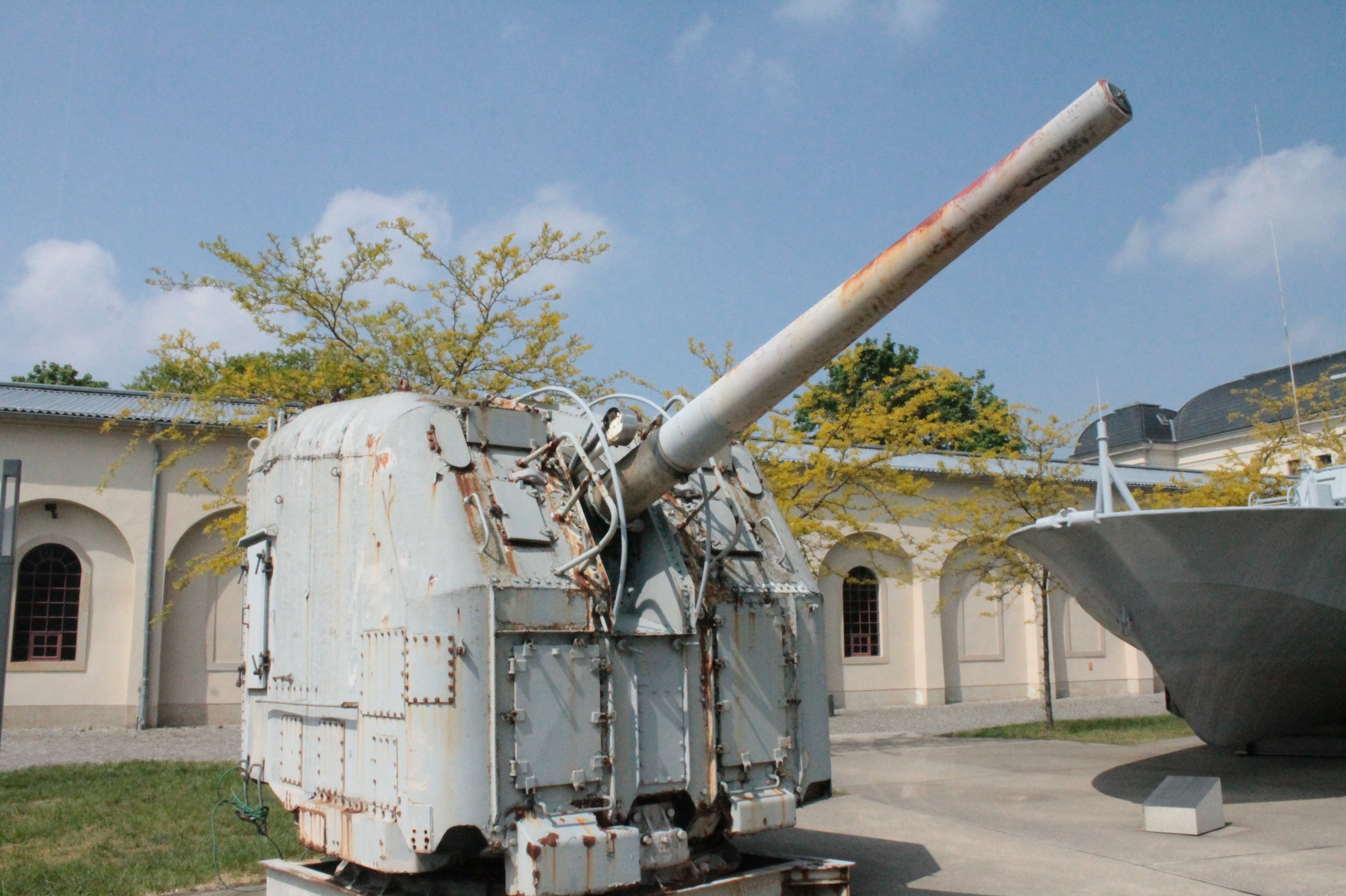
127 mm MK 30 gun from a Fletcher-class destroyer (1942) Bundeswehr Military History Museum, Dresden

Main gun armament was five dual-purpose 5-inch/38 caliber (127 mm) guns in single Mk 30 turrets (numbered bow-to-stern from one to five), guided by a Mark 37 fire control system, including a Mk 12 fire-control radar and a Mk 22 height-finder (replaced by the circular Mk 25 radar postwar) linked by a Mark 1A fire-control computer and stabilized by a Mk 6, 8,500 rpm gyroscope.

Ten 21 in (530 mm) torpedo tubes were fitted in two quintuple mounts amidships, firing the 21-inch Mark 15 torpedo. Antisubmarine armament was two racks for 300-pound (140 kg) depth charges at the stern and six K-gun 300-pound depth-charge throwers amidships.

AA armament initially was light, with a quadruple 1.1"/75 caliber gun located in an elevated tub between the numbers three and four 5-inch gun mounts and six Oerlikon 20 mm cannons (two in front of and below the bridge and four amidships). In June 1942, the 1.1" gun was replaced by a twin Bofors 40 mm gun mount; in some ships, another twin mount may have been added on the fantail between the depth-charge racks. In February 1943, the fantail-mounted Bofors was removed and one twin mount was placed on each side of the aft funnel, bringing the total number of 40 mm guns to six.

In 1942 and 1943, the number of Oerlikon cannons was steadily increased, with ships modified before leaving the shipyard with a seventh 20 mm mount in front of the bridge behind the number-two 5-inch gun mount and from one to three mounts on the flying bridge depending upon the configuration of the ship. In combat, commanders often requisitioned additional guns with some ships mounting up to thirteen 20 mm cannons. In June and July 1943, two more twin Bofors mounts were added in place of the 20 mm cannons in front of and below the bridge, giving ten 40 mm barrels. With this modification, the Oerlikon cannons were rearranged and their number was standardized at seven, four amidships and three in a heart-shaped mount on the fantail.

Due to the increasing threat from kamikaze attacks, beginning in July 1945, some ships returning to the United States for refits received further AA modifications. The forward set of torpedo tubes was removed, providing space to replace the two amidships twin 40 mm guns with two quadruple mountings (for a total of 14 guns). The seven single 20 mm guns were replaced with six twin mounts (four amidships and two on the fantail.

Three (Pringle, Stevens and Halford) were modified during construction by deleting the rear torpedo tube mount and the number-three 5-inch gun mount and putting an aircraft catapult in the space. This alteration was not a success and was not repeated. These three destroyers were later converted to the regular Fletcher-class configuration.

== Service ==
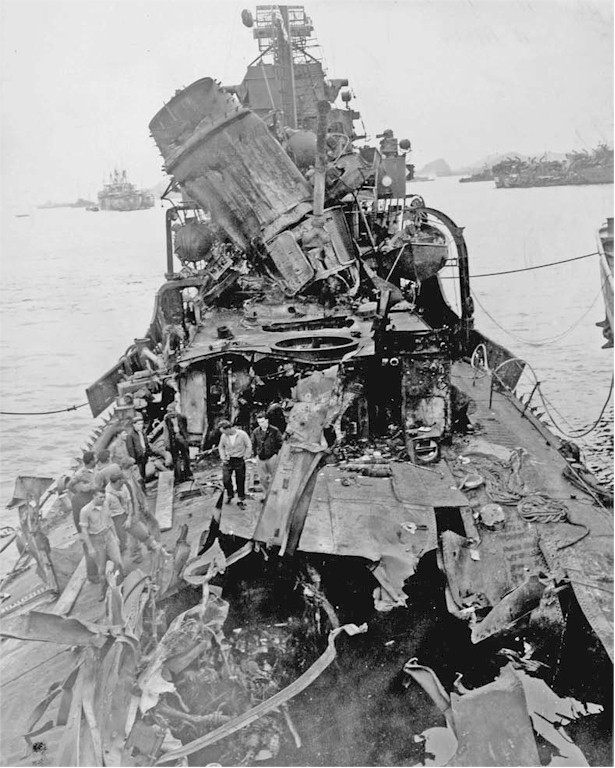
Kamikaze damage to Newcomb following action off Okinawa, 1945

Nineteen Fletchers were lost during World War II; a further six more were severely damaged, evaluated as constructive total losses, and not repaired. Postwar, the remaining ships were decommissioned and put into reserve. Of the 25 Fletcher ships sunk or deemed as constructive total losses, 17 were lost between March and July 1945 off Okinawa. These destroyers were mainly serving as radar pickets, covering the rest of the American fleet and landing forces from kamikaze attacks.

=== Ships lost ===
- De Haven, sunk by land-based Japanese aircraft off Savo Island, 1 February 1943
- Strong, torpedoed and sunk by the Japanese destroyer Niizuki between 19,000-22,000 yards during the battle of Kula Gulf, 5 July 1943, one of the longest ranged torpedo hits in history.
- Chevalier, scuttled after being torpedoed by the Japanese destroyer Yūgumo in the Naval Battle of Vella Lavella, 6 October 1943.
- Brownson, sunk by land-based Japanese aircraft off Cape Gloucester, 26 December 1943
- Hoel, sunk by gunfire from the Japanese battleships Yamato and Nagato and the heavy cruiser Haguro in the Battle off Samar, 25 October 1944.
- Johnston, sunk by gunfire from the Japanese battleship Yamato, light cruiser Yahagi, and destroyers Yukikaze, Isokaze, Urakaze, and Nowaki in the Battle off Samar, 25 October 1944.
- Abner Read, sunk by kamikazes in Leyte Gulf, 1 November 1944
- Spence, foundered in Typhoon Cobra, 18 December 1944
- Halligan, lost to a mine off Okinawa, 26 March 1945
- Bush, sunk by kamikazes off Okinawa, 6 April 1945
- Colhoun, sunk by kamikazes off Okinawa, 6 April 1945
- Pringle, sunk by kamikazes off Okinawa, 16 April 1945
- Little, sunk by kamikazes off Okinawa, 3 May 1945
- Luce, sunk by kamikazes off Okinawa, 4 May 1945
- Morrison, sunk by kamikazes off Okinawa, 4 May 1945
- Longshaw, scuttled after running aground and receiving heavy shore fire south of Naha, Okinawa, 18 May 1945
- William D. Porter, sunk by a kamikaze near miss off Okinawa, 10 June 1945
- Twiggs, sunk by kamikazes off Okinawa, 16 June 1945
- Callaghan, sunk by Yokosuka K5Y kamikaze biplanes off Okinawa, 28 July 1945
- Newcomb, damaged by kamikazes off Okinawa, 6 April 1945. Decommissioned, 20 November 1945. Sold for scrap, 28 March 1946.
- Leutze, damaged by kamikazes off Okinawa, 6 April 1945. Decommissioned, 6 December 1945. Sold for scrap, 17 June 1947.
- Hutchins, damaged by a suicide boat off Okinawa, 27 April 1945. Decommissioned, 30 November 1945. Sold for scrap, January 1948.
- Haggard, damaged by kamikazes off Okinawa, 29 April 1945. Decommissioned, 1 November 1945. Sold for scrap, 3 March 1946.
- Evans, damaged by kamikazes off Okinawa, 11 May 1945. Decommissioned, 7 November 1945. Sold for scrap, 11 February 1947.
- Thatcher, damaged by kamikazes off Okinawa, 20 May 1945. Decommissioned, 23 November 1945. Sold for scrap, 23 January 1948.

=== Korean War ===
With the outbreak of the Korean War, many were returned to active duty. During this time, 39 were refitted under project SCB 74A, reducing their overall main armament and the number of torpedo tubes to accommodate other weapons. A new ahead-throwing weapon called Weapon Alpha was installed in many of the ships. Others carried trainable Hedgehogs. Eighteen ships were redesignated as escort destroyers (DDE), optimized for antisubmarine warfare; these reverted to destroyer (DD) designation in 1962. The last Fletcher-class destroyer to be retired from USN service was the USS Ulhmann (DD-687), on July 15, 1972.

== Other navies ==
Many of the ships were sold to other navies during the mid-1950s, including:

Number of Fletcher-class destroyers sold to other navies
Country	No. sold
Argentina	5 (Note: Five Fletcher ships were transferred to the Argentine Navy in two batches. The first three ships were transferred in 1961 and two more in 1971. By the late 1970s, the ships were obsolete and they did not play a significant role in the Falklands War, being stricken that year for scrapping or use as a target ship.) (see Brown-class destroyer)
Brazil	7 (see Pará-class destroyer)
Chile	2
Colombia	1
Greece	7
Italy	3 (see Fante-class destroyer)
Japan	2 (see Ariake-class destroyer)
Mexico	2
Peru	2
South Korea	3 (see Chungmu-class destroyer)
Spain	5 (see Lepanto-class destroyer)
Republic of China (Taiwan)	4
Turkey	4
West Germany	6 (see Zerstörer 1-class destroyer)

Any ships remaining were broken up in the 1970s. The last Fletcher in service, BAM Cuitlahuac (ex-John Rodgers), left the Mexican navy in 2001, meaning the total service life of the ships stretched over almost six decades and into the 21st century.

List of Fletcher-class destroyers sold to other navies
Country	Pennant	name	Former name	Acquired	Fate
Argentina	D-20	ARA Almirante Brown	USS Heermann	14 August 1961	Scrapped in 1982
Argentina	D-21	ARA Espora	USS Dortch	16 August 1961	Scrapped in 1977
Argentina	D-22	ARA Rosales	USS Stembel	7 August 1961	Scrapped in 1982
Argentina	D-23	ARA Almirante Domecq Garcia	USS Braine	17 August 1971	Sunk as a target on 7 October 1983
Argentina	D-24	ARA Almirante Storni	USS Cowell	17 August 1971	Scrapped in 1982
Brazil	D27	Para	USS Guest	5 June 1959	struck in 1978, sunk as a target on 23 February 1983
Brazil	D28	Paraiba	USS Bennett	15 December 1959	struck and scrapped in 1978
Brazil	D29	Paraná	USS Cushing	20 July 1961	struck in 1973 and scrapped in 1982
Brazil	D30	Pernambuco	USS Hailey	20 July 1961	sunk as a target about 1982
Brazil	D31	Piaui	USS Lewis Hancock	1 August 1967	struck and scrapped in 1989
Brazil	D32	Santa Catarina	USS Irwin	10 May 1968	struck in 1988 and sunk as a target in 1990
Brazil	D33	Maranhao	USS Shields	1 July 1972	struck and scrapped in 1990
Chile	D-14	Blanco Encalada	USS Wadleigh	26 July 1962	struck in 1982, sunk as a target on 28 September 1991
Chile	D-15	Cochrane	USS Rooks	26 July 1962	struck in 1983, scrapped
Chile	N/A	—N/a	USS Charles J. Badger	10 May 1974	scrapped and cannibalized
Colombia	DD-01	ARC Antioquia	USS Hale	23 January 1961	struck in 1973, scrapped
Germany	D 170	Zerstörer 1	USS Anthony	1 January 1958	struck in 1976, sunk as a target on 16 May 1979
Germany	D 171	Zerstörer 2	USS Ringgold	14 July 1959	transferred to Hellenic Navy on 18 September 1981
Germany	D 172	Zerstörer 3	USS Wadsworth	6 October 1959	transferred to Hellenic Navy on 15 October 1980
Germany	D 178	Zerstörer 4	USS Claxton	16 December 1959	transferred to Hellenic Navy in February 1981
Germany	D 179	Zerstörer 5	USS Dyson	17 February 1960	transferred to Hellenic Navy in February 1982
Germany	D 180	Zerstörer 6	USS Charles Ausburne	12 April 1960	scrapped in October 1968
Greece	D-06	Aspis	USS Conner	15 September 1959	struck in 1991, scrapped in 1997
Greece	D-16	Velos	USS Charrette	16 June 1959	Active - In commission as museum ship since 1991
Greece	D-28	Thyella	USS Bradford	27 September 1962	struck in 1981, scrapped in 1981
Greece	D-42	Kimon	USS Ringgold	18 September 1981	struck in 1993, scrapped in 1993
Greece	D-56	Lonchi	USS Hall	9 February 1960	struck on 10 October 1990, scrapped in 1997
Greece	D-63	Navarinon	USS Brown	27 September 1962	struck in 1981, scrapped in 1981
Greece	D-65	Nearchos	USS Wadsworth	15 October 1980	struck in 1991, scrapped in 1991
Greece	D-85	Sfendoni	USS Aulick	21 August 1959	struck in 1991, scrapped in 1997
Greece	N/A	—N/a	USS Claxton	February 1981	scrapped and cannibalized
Greece	N/A	—N/a	USS Dyson	February 1982	scrapped and cannibalized
Italy	D-560	Lanciere	USS Taylor	2 July 1969	struck in 1971 and cannibalized to provide spare parts for her sisters in Italian service
Italy	D-561	Fante	USS Walker	2 July 1969	struck and broken up for scrap in 1977
Italy	D-555	Geniere	USS Prichett	17 January 1970	struck and broken up for scrap in 1975
Japan	DD-183	JDS Ariake	USS Heywood L. Edwards	10 March 1959	struck in 1974, scrapped in 1976
Japan	DD-184	JDS Yūgure	USS Richard P. Leary	10 March 1959	struck in 1974, scrapped on 1 July 1976
Mexico	E-01	ARM Cuauhtémoc	USS Harrison	19 August 1970	Dismantled
Mexico	E-02	ARM Cuitláhuac	USS John Rodgers	19 August 1970	Scrapped in 2011
Spain	D21	Lepanto	USS Capps	15 May 1957	struck in 1985, scrapped
Spain	D22	Almirante Ferrándiz	USS David W. Taylor	15 May 1957	struck in 1987, scrapped
Spain	D23	Almirante Valdés	USS Converse	1 July 1959	struck in 1986, scrapped in 1988
Spain	D24	Alcalá Galiano	USS Jarvis	3 November 1960	struck in 1988, scrapped
Spain	D25	Jorge Juan	USS McGowan	1 December 1960	struck in 1988, scrapped
South Korea	DD-91	ROKS Chung Mu	USS Erben	16 May 1963	possibly scrapped
South Korea	DD-92	ROKS Seoul	USS Halsey Powell	27 April 1968	struck in 1982, scrapped in 1982
South Korea	DD-93	ROKS Pusan	USS Hickox	15 November 1968	struck in 1989, scrapped in 1989
Taiwan (Republic of China)	DDG-108	ROCS Kwei Yang	USS Twining	16 August 1971	struck in 1999, scrapped
Taiwan (Republic of China)	DDG-109	ROCS Ching Yang	USS Mullany	6 October 1971	struck in 1999, sunk as a target on 1 November 2001
Taiwan (Republic of China)	DDG-918	ROCS An Yang	USS Kimberly	1 June 1967	struck in 1999, sunk as a target on 14 October 2003
Taiwan (Republic of China)	DDG-919	ROCS Kuen Yang	USS Yarnall	10 June 1968	struck in 1999, scrapped

== Surviving ships ==
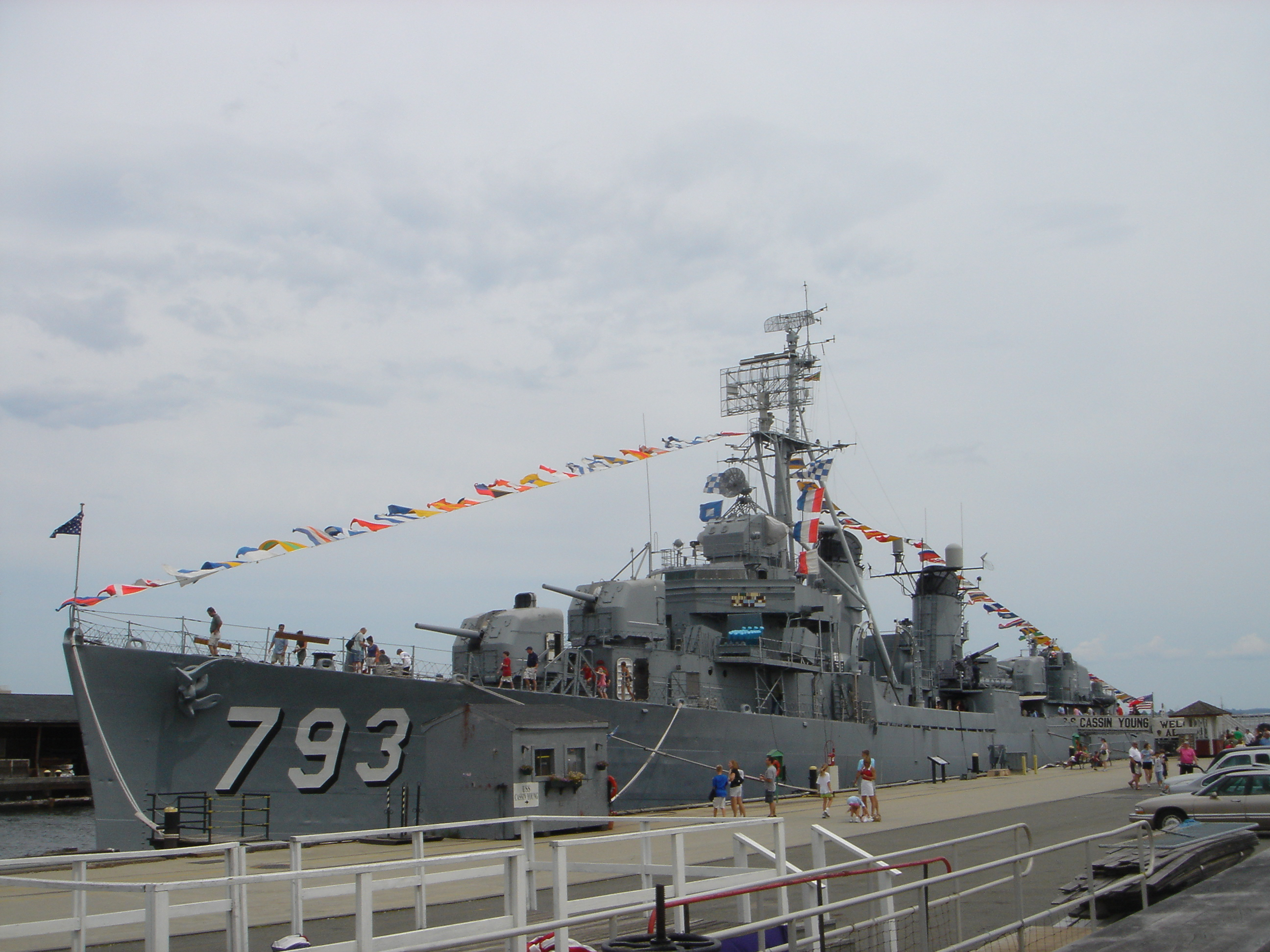
The former USS Cassin Young preserved as a museum ship in 2007

Four Fletcher-class destroyers are preserved as museum ships. Three are in the United States and one is in Greece, although only Kidd retains her World War II configuration.

Velos is the only vessel still in commission. Velos alongside G. Averof are ceremonially commissioned by the Hellenic Navy having Palaio Faliro as their base. Their crew are active Officers of Hellenic Navy. Velos still retains its complete armament and equipment (as modernized in 1950s). In September 2019 its crew took her to Thessaloniki for a short 3-month stay. As of 2026, she remains in Thessaloniki and is a featured attraction at the Thessaloniki Port Crane Monument.

All three American museum ships have been designated as National Historic Landmarks.

=== Surviving ships ===
- USS The Sullivans (DD-537), in Buffalo, New York
- USS Kidd (DD-661), in Baton Rouge, Louisiana
- USS Cassin Young (DD-793), in Boston, Massachusetts
- Velos (D16), ex USS Charrette, in Palaio Faliro, Greece

=== Surviving parts ===
- USS Fletcher (DD-445), in National Museum of the United States Navy, Washington, D.C.
- USS Radford (DD-446), in USS Orleck Naval Museum, Louisiana
- USS Nicholas (DD-449), in the Veterans Memorial Museum in Chehalis, Washington and at Center House, Marine Barracks, Washington, D.C.
- USS Renshaw (DD-499), in Portsmouth Naval Shipyard Museum, Virginia
- USS Foote (DD-511), in National Museum of the Pacific War, Texas
- USS Hailey (DD-556), on a naval base in Rio de Janeiro, Brazil
- USS Smalley (DD-565), in Freedom Park, Omaha, Nebraska
- USS Dyson (DD-572), in Heritage Veterans Memorial Plaza, Texas
- USS Izard (DD-589), in Ohio State University, Ohio
- USS Caperton (DD-650), aboard USS Kidd (DD-661), in Baton Rouge, Louisiana
- USS Knapp (DD-653), in Columbia River Maritime Museum, Oregon
- USS Chauncey (DD-667), aboard USS Kidd (DD-661), in Baton Rouge, Louisiana
- USS Monssen (DD-798), in Freedom Park, Nebraska
- Zerstörer 1 (D170) or Zerstörer 6 (D180), in Bundeswehr Military History Museum, Dresden
- Zerstörer 6 (D180), in Marbeck-Heiden train station, Marbeck
- ROCS Ching Yang (DD-9), in Yuanzhiluxiuxian Park, Tainan City and Táinán jūn shǐ gōngyuán Park, Tainan City
- ROKS Chungmu (DD-91), in Yongsan War Memorial, Seoul
- TCG İçel (D-344), in Derince Naval Base, Kocaeli, Turkey.

=== Notes ===
In 2018, Kidd was used as the filming location for the fictional USS Keeling DD-548 (codenamed Greyhound), from C. S. Forester's novel The Good Shepherd, in her appearance in the book's 2020 cinematic adaptation, Greyhound.

On 14 April 2022, museum ship USS The Sullivans sank at her pier in the Buffalo Naval Park. The depth of water prevented complete sinking. Since then, the ship has been refloated and restoration of the ship's electric system and interior spaces is ongoing.

On 29 March 2023, the Museum of Antidictatorial Struggle HS Velos D-16 sustained damage caused by a storm while docked at Nea Paralia, Thessaloniki. Two tug boats were sent out to prevent further damage by holding her in place. After an investigation by the Ministry of Shipping, the damage was deemed non-threatening to the stability and durability of the ship. Similarly on 19 November 2023 strong gales caused its stern to slam onto the promenade of Nea Paralia resulting in the stern being breached. The day after repair operations began.

== Ships in class ==
- See List of Fletcher-class destroyers

== See also ==
- List of destroyer classes of the United States Navy

== Bibliography ==
- Bauer, K. Jack; Roberts, Stephen S. (1991). Register of Ships of the U.S. Navy, 1775–1990: Major Combatants. Westport, Connecticut: Greenwood Press. ISBN 0-313-26202-0.
- Davis, Rick E. & Wright, Christopher C. (2010). "USN Aircraft-Handling Destroyers 1919 to 1943, Part I: 1919–1941". Warship International. XLVII (3): 265–278. ISSN 0043-0374.
- Friedman, Norman (2004). US Destroyers: An Illustrated Design History (Revised ed.). Annapolis: Naval Institute Press. ISBN 1-55750-442-3.
- Gardiner, Robert; Chesneau, Roger (1980). Conway's All the World's Fighting Ships 1922–1946. London: Conway Maritime Press. ISBN 0-83170-303-2.
- Gardiner, Robert; Chumbley, Stephen (1995). Conway's All the World's Fighting Ships 1947-1995. London: Conway Maritime Press. ISBN 1-55750-132-7.
- Silverstone, Paul H. (1965). U.S. Warships of World War II. London: Ian Allan Ltd. ISBN 0-7110-0157-X.
- Toby, A. Steven (2015). "Note on High Speed Destroyers' Maneuverability". Warship International. LII (1): 24–27. ISSN 0043-0374.
