= USS Shields =

Fletcher-class destroyer

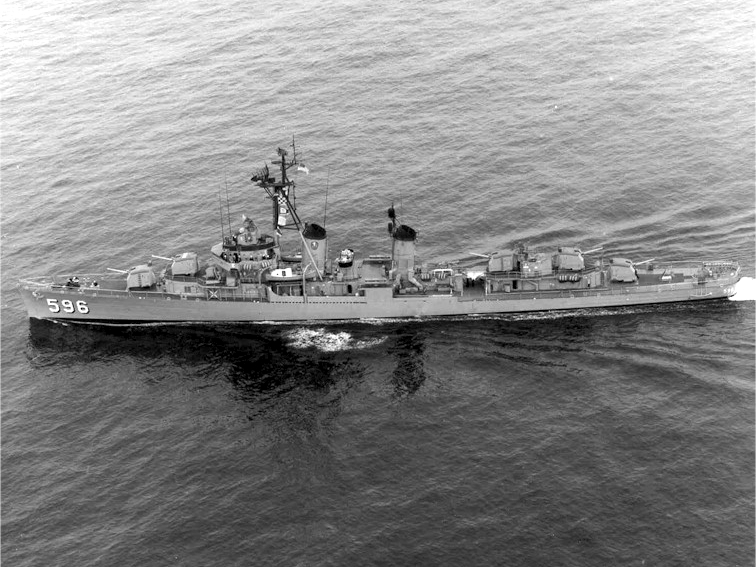
- USS Shields (DD-596) in the 1960s

History

United States
- Name: Shields
- Namesake: Thomas Shields
- Builder: Puget Sound Naval Shipyard
- Laid down: 10 August 1943
- Launched: 25 September 1944
- Commissioned: 8 February 1945
- Decommissioned: 1 July 1972
- Stricken: 1 July 1972
- Fate: Transferred to Brazil, 1 July 1972

Brazil
- Name: Maranhao
- Acquired: 1 July 1972
- Stricken: 1990
- Fate: Scrapped in 1990

General characteristics
- Class & type: Fletcher-class destroyer
- Displacement: 2,050 tons
- Length: 376 ft 6 in (114.76 m)
- Beam: 39 ft 8 in (12.09 m)
- Draft: 17 ft 9 in (5.41 m)
- Propulsion: 60,000 shp (45,000 kW); 2 propellers
- Speed: 35 knots (65 km/h; 40 mph)
- Range: 6,500 nmi (12,000 km; 7,500 mi) at 15 knots (28 km/h; 17 mph)
- Complement: 329
- Armament: 5 × 5 in (127 mm) guns; 4 × 40 mm AA guns; 4 × 20 mm AA guns; 10 × 21 in (533 mm) torpedo tubes; 6 × depth charge projectors; 2 × depth charge tracks

USS Shields (DD-596), was a Fletcher-class destroyer of the United States Navy.

== Namesake ==
Thomas Shields was born in New Castle, Delaware. He appointed midshipman on 2 January 1804. He served on USS Congress and USS Constitution until 1807 and was attached to the naval stations at Philadelphia and Baltimore. While aboard Constitution, he sustained an injury which rendered him physically incapable of performing all the duties required of a line officer. He requested appointment as Purser, which he received on 14 April 1809. He served on USS Nautilus until March 1811 when he was ordered to the New Orleans Naval Station. On 18 January 1815, following the Battle of New Orleans, he led a small expedition to harass the retreating British. He and his party succeeded in capturing numerous prisoners and destroyed several vessels. He remained at the New Orleans Naval Station until his death on 22 May 1827.

== Construction and commissioning ==
The keel of the destroyer, Shields, was laid on 10 August 1943 at Puget Sound Naval Shipyard, Bremerton, Washington. Sponsored by First Lieutenant Margaret Shields Farr, WAC, the great-granddaughter of Purser Shields, the destroyer was launched on 25 September 1944 and commissioned on 8 February 1945.

== World War II ==
Shields' shakedown cruise, interrupted by a nine-day escort assignment with the battleship USS Iowa, lasted from 7 March to 18 April 1945. She departed Puget Sound on 6 May and, after several days of operations in the vicinity of Pearl Harbor, Hawaii, shoved off for Eniwetok Atoll with convoy #PD-413-T. Her short period of combat service in World War II, 24 May – 15 August 1945, consisted almost entirely of escort duty between and patrol duty around Eniwetok, Ulithi, Leyte, Okinawa, and Borneo. Shields saw actual combat only once during the war; she shelled Japanese shore installations at Miri, Borneo, in support of Australian ground forces, on 26 June 1945.

Shields was at Buckner Bay, Okinawa, on 15 August 1945 when she received orders from CINCPACAREA to "cease all offensive activity against the Japanese." After a short cruise to Leyte, Subic Bay, and back to Okinawa, she got underway to rendezvous with Task Group 78.1 (TG 78.1) and serve as escort to units of Transport Squadron 17 (Transron 17), at that time ferrying occupation troops to Jinsen, Korea. The occupation commenced without opposition; and, on 12 September, she steamed out of Jinsen with Task Unit 71.5.1 (TU 71.5.1) bound for the waters off northern China.

For most of the remainder of 1945, Shields remained in the area of the Gulf of Po Hai. Her primary assignment here was to participate in the naval demonstrations being conducted off the coast of northern China. Throughout this period, she also reconnoitered the unstable situation at the port of Chefoo. Her travels while operating off northern China took her to most of the major ports on the Gulf of Po Hai, including Chefoo, Chinwangto, Weihaiwei, Taku, Dairen, and Port Arthur.

Shields rounded out her first Far Eastern tour with a mission to escort the aircraft carriers USS Antietam and USS Boxer to the end of the Seventh Fleet's area of responsibility and patrol duty with the Yangtze River Patrol Force based at Shanghai. She returned to San Pedro Bay, California, on 19 February 1946, having stopped along the way at Eniwetok and Pearl Harbor. She remained on the west coast until being decommissioned and placed in reserve on 14 June 1946.

== Korean War ==
Though decommissioned, Shields continued in an in-service status, participating in the reserve program. She was recommissioned into active service at the outbreak of the Korean War and recommissioned on 15 July 1950. Shields arrived in the Far East in September 1951 for the first of three Korean War tours. During this cruise, which lasted until February 1952, she patrolled the Korean coast in the area of the bombline and Kojo, providing fire support for the First ROK Corps and the First Marine Division. She participated in the assault on Kojo and provided harassing and interdiction fire. Her second Korean War tour, commencing on 1 November 1952, found her again cruising off the Korean coast near the bombline supporting the First ROK Corps and the Eighth Army. Later she took part in antisubmarine warfare exercises off the coasts of Japan and Okinawa and concluded the deployment training Chinese Nationalist naval forces at Taiwan. Stopping at Hong Kong and Japan, Shields returned to San Diego on 1 June 1953.

== 1954 – 1972 ==
After six months on the west coast, she departed for her third Far Eastern cruise. Arriving off Korea on 11 February 1954, she operated there with TF 77 until being detached, on 21 February, to proceed to the Philippine Islands. Shields conducted operations out of Subic Bay during the months of March and April, patrolling the coast of Indochina with Carrier TG 70.2. On 7 May, she embarked for Yokosuka, Japan, stopping en route for a diplomatic representation at Hong Kong. After a week of tender upkeep at Yokosuka, Shields put to sea with TF 77 to conduct battle exercises. She returned to San Diego on 18 July 1954.

Between 18 July 1954 and 30 November 1963, Shields was deployed to WESTPAC seven times. When not assigned to the western Pacific, she engaged in normal destroyer activities out of her home port, San Diego. One of the highlights of this decade of Shields' career was her participation in the commemoration of the triumphant return of Theodore Roosevelt's "Great White Fleet" to San Francisco. Another important occasion was the award of the Battle Efficiency "E" for overall combat readiness in August 1960.

On 30 November 1963, Shields ceased operations as an active fleet unit and was assigned as a Naval Reserve Training ship, part of Reserve Destroyer Squadron 27. With her full-time crew cut more than 50%, she spent the next 8 years working with the Development and Training Command to maintain the combat efficiency of reservists. After a survey of Shields in March 1972, it was determined that the cost of her modernization would be prohibitive and that she was only of marginal value to the Navy without it. Consequently, Shields was decommissioned on 1 July 1972 and sold to the Brazilian Navy.

Shields was awarded the Korean Presidential Unit Citation (Korea) and three battle stars for service in the Korean War.

== Brazilian service ==
She served as Maranhão until her scrapping in 1990.

== See also ==
- USS Marvin Shields (FF-1066)
