= USS Evans (DD-552) =

Fletcher-class destroyer

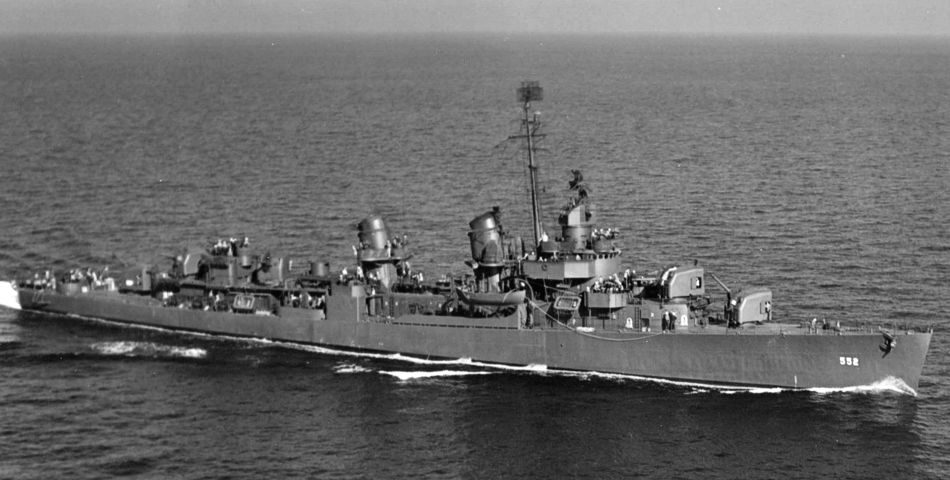
- USS Evans in December 1943

History

United States
- Name: USS Evans (DD-552)
- Namesake: Robley D. Evans (1846–1912), U.S. Navy rear admiral
- Nickname(s): "The Fighting Bob"
- Builder: Gulf Shipbuilding Corporation, Chickasaw, Alabama
- Laid down: 21 July 1941
- Launched: 4 October 1942
- Commissioned: 11 December 1943
- Decommissioned: 7 November 1945
- Stricken: 28 November 1945
- Fate: Sold for scrap 11 February 1947

General characteristics
- Class & type: Fletcher-class destroyer
- Displacement: 2,050 tons
- Length: approx. 376 ft 4 in (114.71 m)
- Beam: 39 ft 8 in (12.09 m)
- Draft: 17 ft 9 in (5.41 m)
- Propulsion: 60,000 shp (45,000 kW); 2 propellers
- Speed: 35 knots (65 km/h; 40 mph)
- Range: 6,500 nmi (12,000 km; 7,500 mi) at 15 kn (28 km/h; 17 mph)
- Complement: 273
- Armament: 5 × single Mk 12 5 in (127 mm)/38 guns; 5 × twin 40 mm (1.6 in) Bofors AA guns; 7 × single 20 mm (0.8 in) Oerlikon AA guns; 2 × quintuple 21 in (533 mm) torpedo tubes; 6 × single depth charge throwers; 2 × depth charge racks

USS Evans (DD-552), a Fletcher-class destroyer, was the second ship of the United States Navy to be named for Rear Admiral Robley D. Evans (1846–1912).

== Construction and commissioning ==
Evans was launched on 4 October 1942 by the Gulf Shipbuilding Company at Chickasaw, Alabama sponsored by Mrs. C. E. Isherwood, and commissioned on 11 December 1943.

== Pacific service ==
=== Marianas ===
Evans reached Majuro on 29 March 1944 from Pearl Harbor and the East Coast, and after escorting Cimarron to a midocean fueling rendezvous, conducted independent antisubmarine patrols around Japanese-held atolls in the Marshall Islands until 13 May. After training in the Hawaiian Islands, she departed Pearl Harbor on 3 June to screen the fueling and aircraft replacement group supporting both the fast carrier task force and the carrier escort force during the assault and capture of Saipan which began on 15 June. She continued to screen this fueling group through the summer as the Marianas were won, returning to Eniwetok to replenish from time to time.

=== Palau and Ulithi ===
On 26 August 1944, Evans sailed from Eniwetok to screen the fueling and aircraft replacement group for the assault and occupation of the Palau Islands, and arriving at Ulithi on 30 October, served on patrol and escort duty there through 11 January 1945. After a special assignment to hunt submarines near Yap and to bombard that island, from 11 to 13 January, Evans sailed to Saipan, from which she screened transports to the landings on Iwo Jima on 19 February. She conducted shore bombardment and supported the troops ashore with harassing fire on Japanese positions, then screened escort carriers until 8 March, when she sailed to Ulithi.

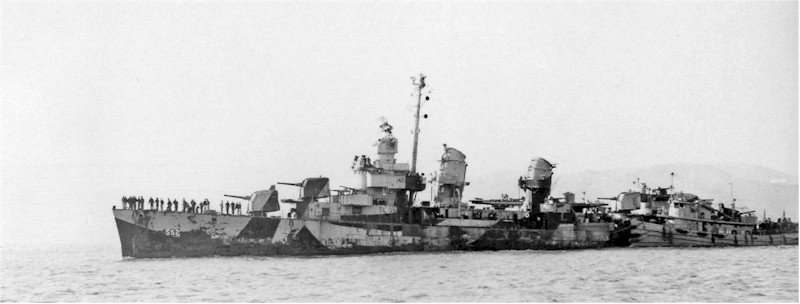
Broadside view of Evans showing her battle damage upon arrival at the Mare Island Navy Yard on 28 July 1945.

=== Okinawa ===
Evans cleared Ulithi on 21 March 1945 to screen escort carriers in pre-invasion air strikes on Okinawa and served with them through the 1 April assault on the island, and until 2 May, when she put into Kerama Retto. Eight days later, she got underway with Hugh W. Hadley for a radar picket station northwest of Okinawa. During the first night on station, 10–11 May, enemy planes were constantly in evidence; more than a hundred attacked the two destroyers and the two LCSs with them. Evans fought determinedly against this overwhelming assault, shooting down many of them, but in quick succession, four kamikazes struck her. After engineering spaces flooded, and she lost power, Evans' crew strove to save her, using portable fire extinguishers and bucket brigades. They succeeded, though 32 were killed and 27 wounded, and the ship was towed into Kerama Retto on 14 May for repairs. She was awarded the Presidential Unit Citation for high gallantry and achievement.

== Decommissioned and scrapped ==
After emergency repairs at Kerama Retto, Evans was towed to San Francisco, where she was decommissioned on 7 November, and stricken from the Naval Vessel Register on 28 November 1945. She was sold for scrap on 11 February 1947.

== Honors ==
In addition to the Presidential Unit Citation, Evans received five battle stars for her World War II service.

- Presidential Unit Citation
