= USS John Rodgers (DD-574) =

Fletcher-class destroyer

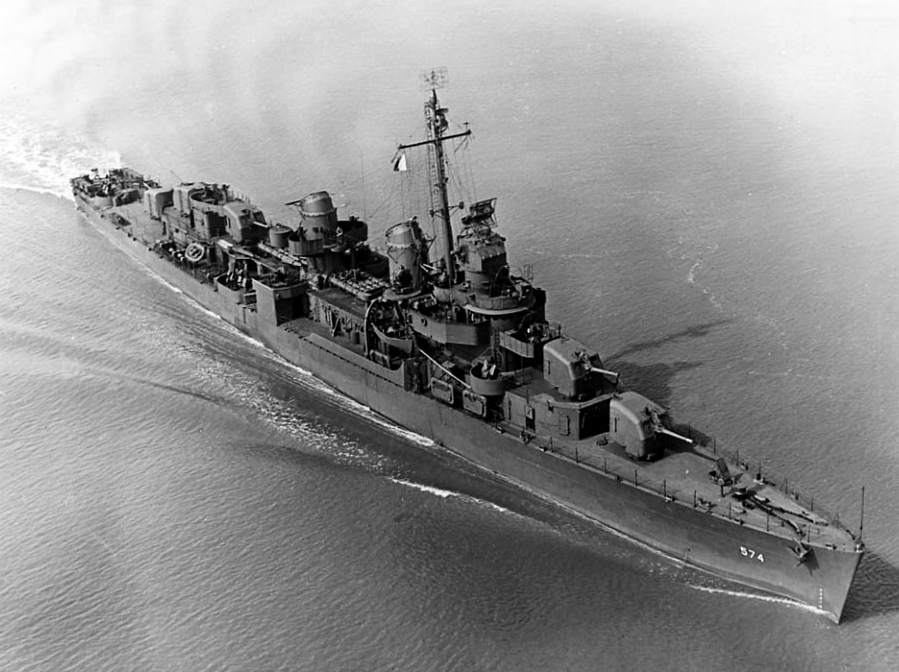
- USS John Rodgers (DD-574) at Charleston, South Carolina, 29 April 1943

History

United States
- Name: USS John Rodgers (DD-574)
- Namesake: three members of the Rodgers family
- Builder: Consolidated Steel Corporation, Orange, Texas
- Laid down: 25 July 1941
- Launched: 7 May 1942
- Sponsored by: Miss Helen Perry Rodgers
- Commissioned: 9 February 1943
- Decommissioned: 25 May 1946
- Stricken: 1 May 1968
- Fate: Transferred to Mexico, 19 Aug 1970

History

Mexico
- Name: ARM Cuitláhuac (E02)
- Namesake: Cuitláhuac
- Acquired: 19 Aug 1970
- Decommissioned: 2001
- Stricken: 16 July 2001
- Fate: Scrapped 2011

General characteristics
- Class & type: Fletcher-class destroyer
- Displacement: 2,050 tons
- Length: 376 ft 6 in (114.7 m)
- Beam: 39 ft 8 in (12.1 m)
- Draft: 17 ft 9 in (5.4 m)
- Propulsion: 60,000 shp (45 MW); 2 propellers
- Speed: 35 knots (65 km/h; 40 mph)
- Range: 6,500 nm at 15 kn (12,000 km at 28 km/h)
- Complement: 273
- Armament: 5 × 5 in (130 mm)/38 cal guns, 10 × 40 mm AA guns, 7 × 20 mm AA guns, 10 × 21 inch (533 mm) torpedo tubes, 6 × depth charge projectors, 2 × depth charge tracks

USS John Rodgers (DD-574) was a Fletcher-class destroyer of the United States Navy commissioned during World War II and the second ship to bear the name. She was named after three members of the Rodgers family who served in the Navy from the War of 1812 through World War I. John Rodgers served in several wartime actions in the Pacific, receiving 12 battle stars.

She was laid up shortly after the end of the war before being sold to the Mexican Navy in 1970, where she served until 2001 as BAM Cuitláhuac, becoming the last of the Fletcher-class destroyers in service. She was scrapped in Mexico in 2010-2011 after efforts failed to return her to the U.S. as a museum ship.

== Construction and commissioning ==
John Rodgers was laid down by Consolidated Steel Corporation, Orange, Texas, on 25 July 1941; launched 7 May 1942, sponsored by Miss Helen Perry Rodgers, daughter, great-grandniece, and great-granddaughter of the ship's namesakes; and commissioned 9 February 1943.

== Service history ==
=== United States Navy ===
==== 1943 ====
After shakedown in the Caribbean, John Rodgers departed Norfolk, Virginia on 13 May escorting a convoy through the Panama Canal to Pearl Harbor. Following a short working up period, she joined the screen of a fast carrier task force in August during raids on Marcus Island, Tarawa, and Wake Island which also gathered intelligence for future landings.

In November as part of a joint cruiser-destroyer force, she sailed for Empress Augusta Bay to support landings on Bougainville. While escorting transports, she assisted the Cruiser, Santa Fe in shooting down a Japanese torpedo bomber.

She then joined the destroyer screen of the Southern Attack Force for the invasion of the Gilbert Islands, protecting transports during the landings on Betio Island on 20 November and remained in the area until Tarawa Atoll was secure.

==== 1944 ====
Late in December, the destroyers sailed to Pearl Harbor to prepare for the next offensive, departing 22 January 1944 for the Marshall Islands. Benefiting from experience gained in previous engagements, the Navy launched a coordinated attack on Kwajalein Atoll on 31 January. John Rodgers provided anti-aircraft and anti-submarine protection, and supported the landing forces with her 5-inch guns. After the end of Japanese resistance on 7 February, she patrolled the Marshall Island area until late March. During April, she acted as escort for ships bringing troops and supplies during the assault of Hollandia.

In May, John Rodgers operated out of Guadalcanal screening convoys and shelling enemy positions. Early in June she sailed to the Marshall Islands to prepare for the Marianas Campaign and departed Eniwetok on 17 July with the Guam invasion force. Beginning on 21 July, John Rodgers fired over 3,600 5-inch rounds at targets on Guam helping to knock out defensive positions. She remained in the Mariana Islands until 4 August and provided an anti-submarine screen for transports ships.

In August, John Rodgers began preparations for the Morotai Invasion and departed Humboldt Bay on 14 September to support and screen the landings. After this operation, which provided the only Allied base from which to stage short-range fighters and bombers to Leyte, she remained on patrol in the area.

John Rodgers returned to Hollandia on 2 October to prepare for the invasion of the Philippines. She got underway for Leyte on 13 October and arrived to support landings 7 days later. Now commanded by Commander J. G. Franklin, she screened the ships carrying General Douglas MacArthur and his troops back to the Philippines. As American troops moved inland and took the airfields, she provided fire support, and patrolled the area.

==== 1945 ====
John Rodgers departed the Philippines 30 October for Mare Island Naval Shipyard, California, and a badly needed overhaul. In early January 1945, the destroyer sailed west to join Admiral Raymond Spruance's Task Force 58 (TF 58) on 7 February for carrier aircraft strikes on the Japanese homeland beginning 16 February. She sailed to the Bonin Islands to screen the carrier task force covering the invasion of Iwo Jima on 19 February, gaining a forward base for B-29 Superfortresses.

Following Iwo Jima, she resumed duty with the fast carrier task force raiding Japan while awaiting the invasion of Okinawa, the last major amphibious operation of the Pacific campaign. John Rodgers operated with the carriers as they bombed Japan and Okinawa. She screened the first assault on 1 April, protecting the carriers, and claiming two kamikazes shot down. She remained in the area supporting operations until Okinawa was secure on 21 June.

As the war closed, John Rodgers screened the 3rd Fleet during almost continuous raids on Japan. As the Flagship of Destroyer Squadron, 25 (DesRon 25) since September 1943, the USS John Rodgers led DesRon 25 in late July on the Suruga Wan anti-shipping sweep and approached within 1½ miles of the Japanese shoreline. Admiral William Halsey congratulated the division commander "Loud applause to you and your boys for a well-planned sweep conducted in the best destroyer tradition. You have been enrolled on the emperor's blacklist."

Following the atomic bombing of Hiroshima and Nagasaki and the subsequent collapse of Japan, the destroyer screened transports carrying occupation troops into Tokyo Bay on 6 September. The entry into Tokyo was a fitting climax for John Rodgers who had fought in almost every major offensive campaign of the Pacific War without losing a single man.

She sailed for home and arrived Boston, Massachusetts on 17 October. She moved to Charleston, South Carolina on 3 November, decommissioned there on 25 May 1946, and entered the Atlantic Reserve Fleet. She was moved to Philadelphia in 1954, and Orange, Texas, in 1968.

=== Mexican Navy ===
The ship was sold as-is to Mexico 19 Aug 1970. She served in the Mexican Navy as ARM Cuitláhuac (E 01), named after Cuitláhuac (?-1520), the second-to-last Aztec emperor of Mexico. Cuitláhuac was retired by the Mexican Navy on 16 July 2001, bringing to an end the 60-year service history of the Fletcher-class ships.

=== Post-deactivation ===
John Rodgers was acquired by Beauchamp Tower Corp., a small non-profit foundation based in Florida, in late 2006 with the stated purpose of returning her to Mobile, Alabama as a museum ship but the plans fell through, and John Rodgers was moored unattended at a granary pier at the Port of Lázaro Cárdenas, Mexico, accumulating more than $2 million in liens and penalties. The Mexican Government in 2008 announced plans to seize and dispose of her as a derelict, and on 2 August 2010, declared that the ship was abandoned property, ordering her to be scrapped.

The ship was dismantled in the port of Lázaro Cárdenas beginning in September 2010, and work was completed in April 2011.

== Awards ==
John Rodgers received 12 battle stars for her World War II service.
