= USS Chauncey (DD-667) =

Fletcher-class destroyer

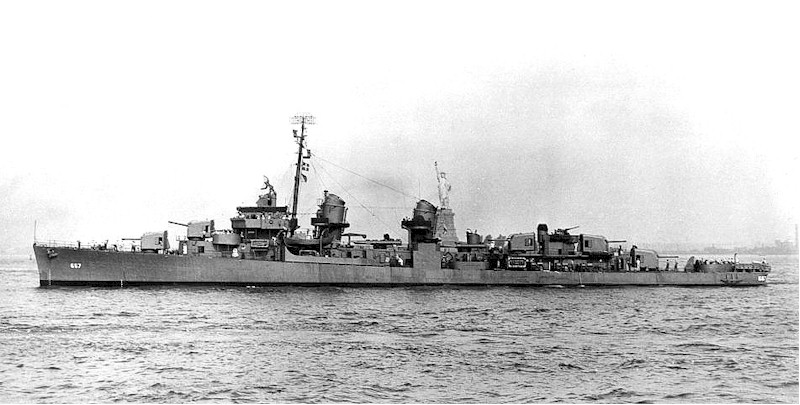
- USS Chauncey in New York Harbor with Statue of Liberty on 13 August 1943.

History

United States
- Name: Chauncey
- Namesake: Isaac Chauncey
- Builder: Federal Shipbuilding and Drydock Company, Kearny, New Jersey
- Laid down: 14 November 1942
- Launched: 28 March 1943
- Commissioned: 31 May 1943
- Decommissioned: 14 May 1954
- Stricken: 1 October 1972
- Fate: Sold 2 January 1974 for scrapping

General characteristics
- Class & type: Fletcher-class destroyer
- Displacement: 2,050 tons
- Length: 376 ft 6 in (114.76 m)
- Beam: 39 ft 8 in (12.09 m)
- Draft: 17 ft 9 in (5.41 m)
- Propulsion: 60,000 shp (45,000 kW); 2 propellers
- Speed: 35 knots (65 km/h; 40 mph)
- Range: 6,500 nmi (12,000 km; 7,500 mi) at 15 kn (28 km/h; 17 mph)
- Complement: 319
- Armament: 5 × single Mk 12 5 in (127 mm)/38 guns; 5 × twin 40 mm (1.6 in) Bofors AA guns; 7 × single 20 mm (0.8 in) Oerlikon AA guns; 2 × quintuple 21 in (533 mm) torpedo tubes; 6 × single depth charge throwers; 2 × depth charge racks

USS Chauncey (DD-667) was a Fletcher-class destroyer of the United States Navy, the third Navy ship named for Commodore Isaac Chauncey (1779–1840).

Chauncey was launched 28 March 1943 by Federal Shipbuilding and Dry Dock Company, Kearny, New Jersey; sponsored by Mrs. R. K. Anderson; and commissioned 31 May 1943.

== Service history ==
=== World War II ===
Clearing Norfolk, Virginia, 28 August 1943, Chauncey reached Pearl Harbor 19 September. She was assigned to the screen of a fast carrier task force for a punishing series of air strikes on Wake Island 5 and 6 October 1943. While screening the carriers, Chauncey rescued three downed aviators from the water. After a brief return to Pearl Harbor, Chauncey sailed with another carrier task force for Espiritu Santo, arriving 6 November 1943.

The destroyer sailed 3 days later for the air raids on Rabaul of 11 November, in coordination with the Bougainville landings. After the first successful strike launched by the carriers, enemy planes came swarming out to seek vengeance, and a furious 46-minute action, during which Chauncey's guns blazed almost continuously, resulted in a large number of splashed Japanese aircraft. Chauncey, continuing to screen the same carrier force, now sailed north to begin the preassault air strikes on Tarawa, 18, 19, and 20 November. As the landings began on 20 November, the carriers launched combat air patrol, antisubmarine searches, and close support strikes, which continued until the island was secured after furious fighting ashore. During this operation, Chauncey again helped drive a Japanese counterattack from the air above the ships she guarded.

With the Marshall Islands operation scheduled for the next month, Chauncey's force was assigned a strike at Kwajalein, center of Japanese air power in the Marshalls, and the shipping in its harbor. Air strikes were launched 4 December 1943 at Kwajalein and Wotje, but Japanese retaliation came in the evening, and Chauncey joined in the fire which splashed many enemy planes and drove them away just after midnight. Her task force sailed on to replenish and repair at Pearl Harbor. Bound for action once more, Chauncey sailed to Funafuti, where she made rendezvous with a seaplane tender whom she and another destroyer escorted up to Tarawa. After brief patrol duty there, she returned to Funafuti to prepare for the next operation, Majuro.

Chauncey sailed on 22 January 1944 to screen escort carriers north to Majuro, assaulted on 30 January. The destroyer screened and patrolled at Majuro and Kwajalein during the assault and occupation of the atolls, and in mid-March returned to the South Pacific. After 10 days early in April on watchful patrol off newly occupied Emirau Island, Chauncey screened escort carriers into position to cover the Aitape landings 22 April, and guarded them as they provided close air support, sailed north to replenish at Manus on 28 April, and returned to their covering strikes off New Guinea until 12 May.

Now Chauncey was assigned to guard the escort carriers assembling and rehearsing for the Marianas operation, and on 8 June 1944, arrived at Kwajalein for final preparations. She got underway two days later to screen carriers supporting the landings on Saipan with preassault raids on 13 and 14 June, and air cover during the assault on 15 June. Next day Chauncey joined the group operating off Guam for bombardments and air strikes, and her guns aided in driving off enemy air attacks on the 16th and 17th. Returning to Saipan, she screened carriers there until the 25th, when she got underway to escort transports to Eniwetok. She returned to operate with the carriers off Saipan and Guam from early July, and on 9 July began her part in the continuous bombardment of Guam before the landings there 21 July.

Chauncey continued to screen carriers covering operations on Guam through July, aside from an escort voyage to Eniwetok with unladen transports, and on 10 August, left Guam eastern bound for Eniwetok and repairs at Pearl Harbor. She returned to Manus to prepare for the massive Philippine operation, and on 14 October sailed for Leyte guarding the Southern Attack Force transports. She offered close-in protection during the landings on 20 October, and that night patrolled watchfully around the transports, which remained dangerously close to shore in order to speed their unloading. On 22 October, two days before the opening of the decisive Battle of Leyte Gulf, Chauncey cleared to escort unloaded ships to Manus, from which she made two voyages to escort ships to Leyte and Palau during November.

After overhaul and training off the west coast until late February 1945, the destroyer returned to Pearl Harbor. Here she was joined by a carrier, whom she escorted to Ulithi, where Chauncey was assigned to mighty Task Force 58 for the preliminaries to the Okinawa operation. The force got underway 14 March for strikes on airfields on Kyūshū and shipping in the Inland Sea and at Kure and Kobe, Chauncey and other destroyers providing the essential screening services. Japanese retaliation came in a bombing raid on 19 March, when carrier Franklin was badly damaged but kept afloat by her crew's heroic work. Chauncey moved in to protect the stricken giant, and to guard her as she was towed and later steamed under her own power toward safety. Japanese air attacks were beaten off once more on the 20th and 21st, Chauncey firing with the others to splash many enemy planes.

Her force launched prelanding strikes at Okinawa and nearby islands, and after the landings on 1 April 1945, supported the ground forces and protected the transports. Chauncey continued her screening, and from 6 April, when the first great kamikaze attacks were hurled at American shipping off Okinawa, fired often to drive the would-be suicides off. She also served in shore bombardment and radar picket duty until 29 May, when she sailed for repairs and replenishment in San Pedro Bay, Philippine Islands. She then joined Task Force 38 for the final smashing air raids on Japan.

Following the war, Chauncey remained in the Far East on occupation duty until 11 November, when she cleared Tsingtao, China for the west coast. She was placed out of commission in reserve at San Diego 19 December 1945.

=== Korean War ===
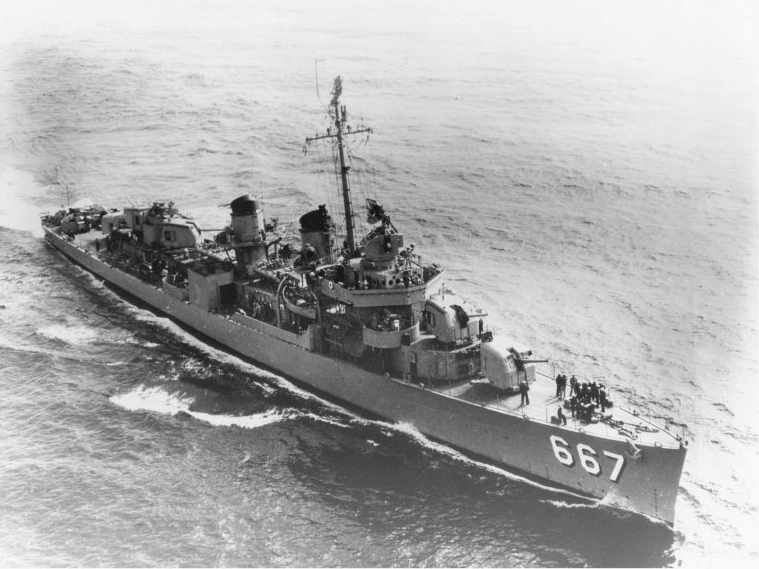
Chauncey in the 1950s.

Upon the outbreak of the Korean War, Chauncey was recommissioned 18 July 1950, and on 1 November, sailed to join the Atlantic Fleet. Chauncey operated from her home port at Norfolk, Virginia, along the east coast, and in the Caribbean, until 10 January 1953, when she got underway for the west coast on the first leg of a round-the-world voyage. Reaching Sasebo, Japan, 11 February, Chauncey screened the carriers of TF 77 off Korea during the final months preceding the Korean Armistice, and in June sailed on to call at Hong Kong, Singapore, Colombo, Aden, Athens, Naples, Cannes, and Gibraltar before her return to Norfolk 6 August.

Chauncey resumed her east coast and Caribbean operations until 14 May 1954, when she was again decommissioned and placed in reserve.

== Awards ==
Chauncey received seven battle stars for World War II service, and two for Korean service.
