= USS Rowe =

Fletcher-class destroyer

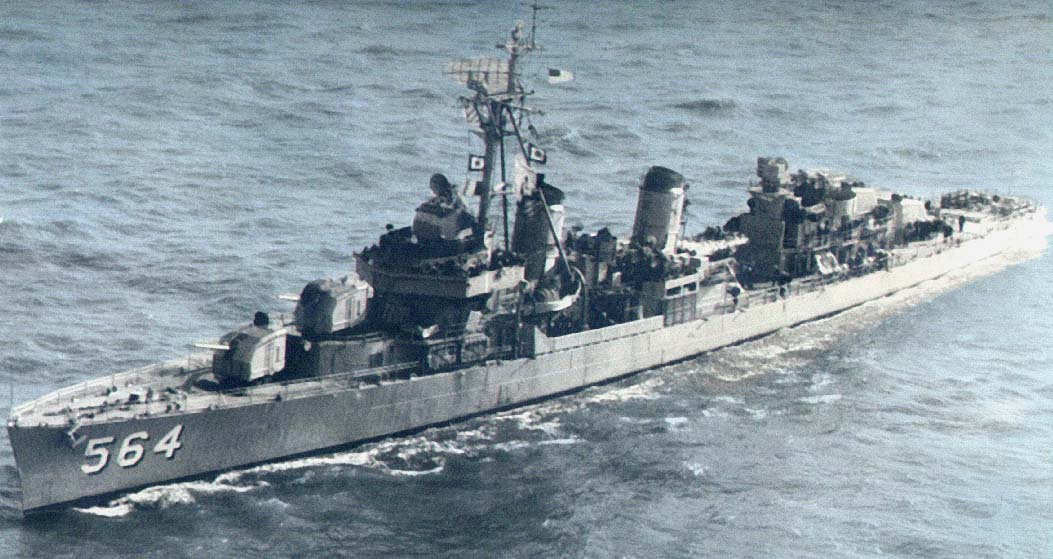
- USS Rowe in open sea

History

United States
- Namesake: John Rowe
- Builder: Seattle-Tacoma Shipbuilding Corporation
- Laid down: 7 December 1942
- Launched: 30 September 1943
- Commissioned: 13 March 1944 to 31 January 1947; 5 October 1951 to 6 November 1959
- Stricken: 1 December 1974
- Fate: Sunk as a target off the coast of Puerto Rico on 23 February 1978

General characteristics
- Class & type: Fletcher-class destroyer
- Displacement: 2,050 tons
- Length: 376 ft 6 in (114.7 m)
- Beam: 39 ft 8 in (12.1 m)
- Draft: 17 ft 9 in (5.4 m)
- Propulsion: 60,000 shp (45 MW); 2 propellers
- Speed: 35 knots (65 km/h)
- Range: 6500 nmi. (12,000 km) @ 15 kt
- Complement: 329
- Armament: 5 × 5 in (130 mm), 4 × 40 mm AA guns, 4 × 20 mm AA guns, 10 × 21 inch (533 mm) torpedo tubes, 6 × depth charge projectors, 2 × depth charge tracks

USS Rowe (DD-564) was a Fletcher-class destroyer of the United States Navy.

== Namesake ==
John Rowe was appointed midshipman in the Navy on 2 December 1799. He volunteered for Lieutenant Stephen Decatur's expedition into Tripoli Harbor during the First Barbary War. On 16 February 1804, USS Intrepid's crew boarded and set fire to USS Philadelphia, destroying the frigate, which had fallen into enemy hands. He was commissioned lieutenant on 21 March 1807 and resigned from the Navy on 27 August 1808.

== Construction and commissioning ==
Rowe was laid down 7 December 1942 by the Seattle-Tacoma Shipbuilding Co., Seattle, Wash.; launched 30 September 1943; sponsored by Mrs. Louise Bradley Roberson; and commissioned 13 March 1944.

== World War II ==
Following shakedown off San Diego, Rowe got underway for Pearl Harbor 24 May 1944. After 2 weeks of additional underway training in the Hawaiian Islands, she completed a round-trip escort run to Eniwetok, 16 June to 2 July, and on 3 August 1944 sailed as flagship of Destroyer Squadron 57 (DesRon 57) for Adak, Alaska, to report for duty with the 9th Fleet. She engaged in underway training there, and participated in three strikes against the Kurils; Matsuwa To Island on 21 November 1944, Suribati Wan on 3 January 1945, and Kurabu Zaki, Paramushiro Island on 18 February 1945. On 18 April, Destroyer Division 113 (DesDiv 113) was detached from the North Pacific Force and sailed for Pearl Harbor.

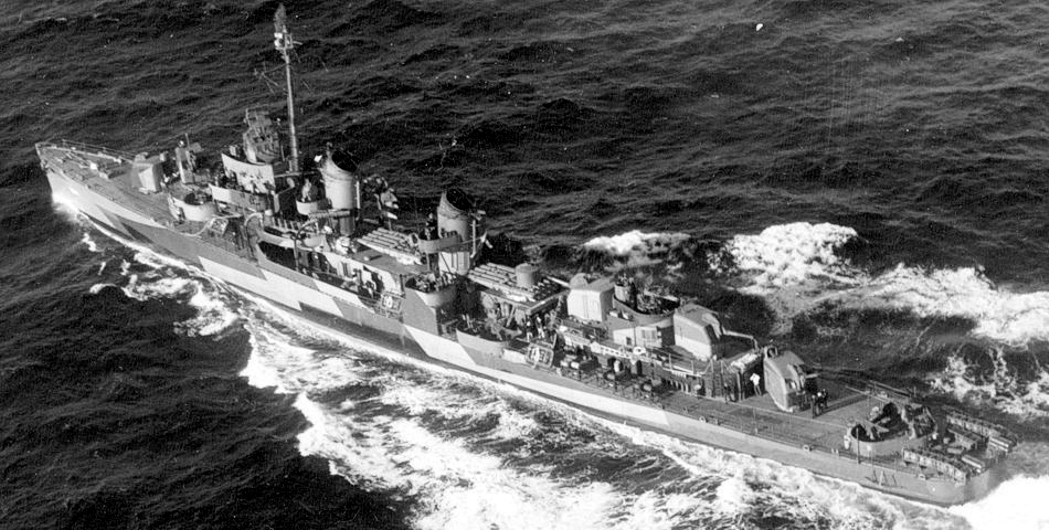
Rowe seen here in 1944.

Following repairs and training, Rowe sailed on 11 May for Ulithi with aircraft carrier Ticonderoga and her destroyer division. Arriving 22 May, she joined the 5th Fleet for duty and a week later left Ulithi in convoy for Okinawa. Reaching the Ryukyus 2 June, Rowe began radar picket duty. Fifteen days later, with DesDiv 113, she escorted the battleship Mississippi out of Hagushi anchorage and steamed for the Philippines, reaching San Pedro Bay, Leyte Gulf, 20 June.

Standing out of Leyte Gulf on 1 July, Rowe rendezvoused with Task Force 38 (TF 38) for screening and plane guard duties during attacks against the Japanese home islands—Honshū, Shikoku and Hokkaidō. The first strike was launched on 10 July against airfields and installations in the vicinity of Tokyo. Temporarily detached on 23 July 1945, Rowe participated in the bombardment of the town of Omura on Chichi Jima, then rejoined the carrier force.

When the official Japanese Instrument of Surrender was signed in Tokyo Bay on 2 September 1945, Rowe was still steaming with Task Group 38.4 (TG 38.4) in a patrol area east of Honshū Island, while the group's planes performed air observation missions over prisoner of war camps. Following a round-trip run to Eniwetok, Rowe steamed out of Tokyo Bay 18 November for Pearl Harbor and the United States.

Touching at San Diego, Calif., Rowe transited the Panama Canal 17 December and reached Philadelphia, Pa. 23 December. Arriving Charleston, S.C. 20 March 1946, Rowe decommissioned 31 January 1947 and was berthed at Charleston as a unit of the Atlantic Reserve Fleet.

== 1951–1959 ==
After almost 5 years, on 20 September 1951, Rowe was brought out of mothballs and recommissioned 5 October 1951. Following shakedown in the Guantanamo Bay area, Rowe conducted shore bombardment exercises at Culebra Island, Puerto Rico, and returned to Norfolk, Va. 12 March 1952 for local operations with DesDiv 322. In July she steamed to Halifax returning to Charleston in late August for a yard availability.

Following further training exercises in the Caribbean in early 1953, she made a midshipman cruise to Europe during the summer, and, during the fall, she undertook hunter-killer antisubmarine warfare exercises with Task Group 81.2 in the Caribbean.

On 20 April 1954 Rowe, with ComDesRon 32 embarked, got underway for duty in the Far East. Steaming via Panama, she reached Yokosuka, Japan, 28 May 1954. Three days later she and Fechteler got underway for Sasebo, thence to Pusan for patrol duties. Arriving the same day, they relieved Douglas H. Fox and Laffey on Korean patrol. On 4 June Rowe assisted crash boats and aircraft in a search for a United States Air Force plane that had crashed between Korea and Japan. Six members of the plane's crew and passengers were rescued. Rowe then towed an Air Force seaplane, which was unable to take off in the rough seas, to port. On 28 August 1954, Rowe completed her tour with the Seventh Fleet and prepared for the homeward leg of her round-the-world journey. Steaming via Suez and the Mediterranean, the division arrived in Norfolk 28 October 1954.

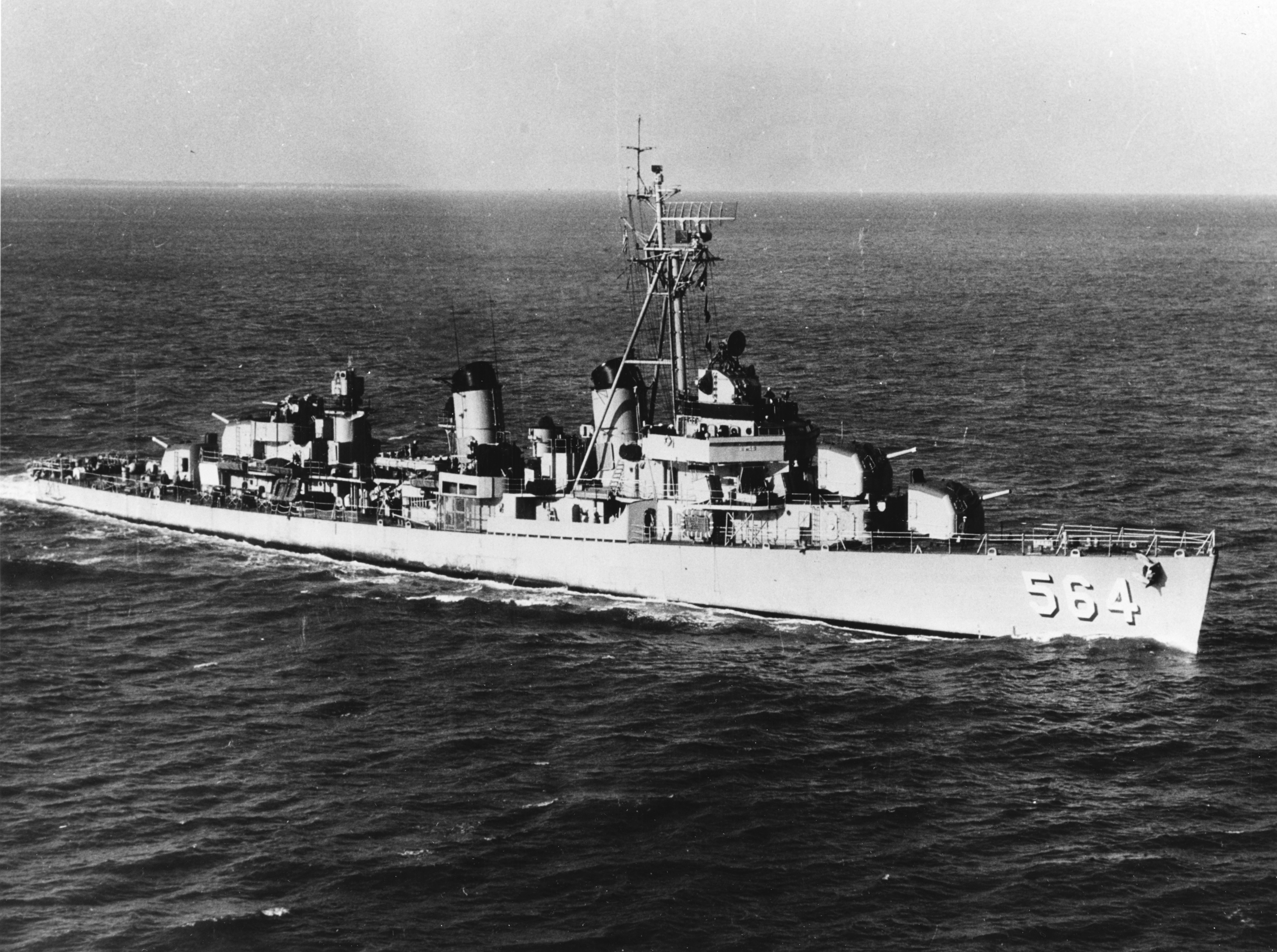
Rowe in the late 1950s.

The following months were spent in tender availability, upkeep, leave and local operations. On 20 June 1955, while conducting high-speed night carrier operations with Bennington, Rowe rescued a downed pilot. From 18 July through 19 September, Rowe participated in various CONVEX events and training exercises while operating with Commander, Anti-Submarine Warfare Forces, Atlantic Fleet. Rowe returned to Mediterranean duty on 5 November and served in the 6th Fleet returning to Norfolk 26 February 1956.

In June and July 1956, Rowe conducted another midshipman cruise, then resumed operations out of Norfolk. Attached to the 6th Fleet, 21 October 1957 to 5 March 1958, Rowe returned to European waters in June to call at ports in Sweden and Germany. Back in Norfolk in early August, she operated off the Atlantic and Gulf of Mexico coasts until decommissioned in November 1959 and berthed at Norfolk, where she remained until struck from the Navy Directory on 1 December 1974.

== Honors ==
Rowe earned three battle stars for World War II service.
