= Robert H. Smith-class destroyer =

Class of destroyer minelayers warship

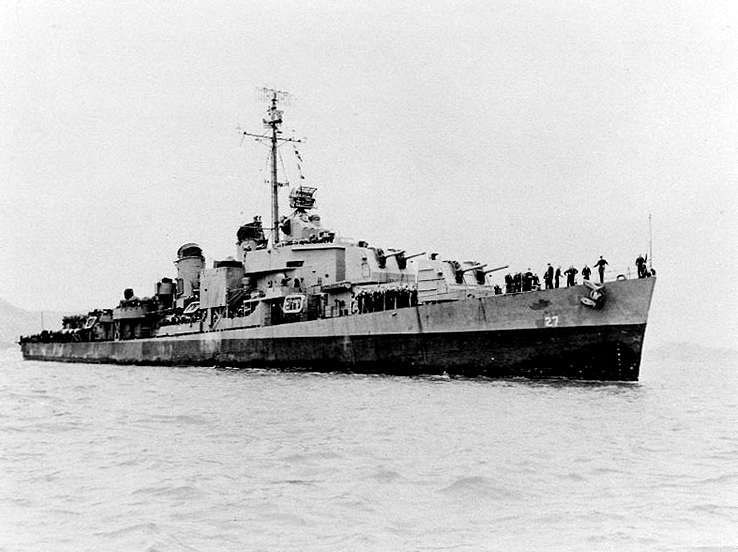
- USS Adams

Class overview
- Name: Robert H. Smith class
- Builders: Bath Iron Works, Maine (6); Bethlehem Staten Island, New York (3); Bethlehem San Pedro, California (3)
- Operators: United States Navy; Turkish Navy
- Built: 1943–1944
- Completed: 12
- Retired: 12

General characteristics
- Type: Destroyer minelayer
- Displacement: 2,200 tons (standard)
- Length: 376 ft 6 in (114.76 m)
- Beam: 40 ft 10 in (12.45 m)
- Draft: 18 ft 10 in (5.74 m)
- Installed power: 4 Babcock & Wilcox or Foster Wheeler boilers; 60,000 shp (45,000 kW)
- Propulsion: Two General Electric or Westinghouse geared steam turbines; Two shafts
- Speed: 34 kn (63 km/h) max
- Range: 4,600 nmi (8,500 km) at 15 kn (28 km/h)
- Complement: 363 standard
- Armament: 6 × 5 in (127 mm)/38 cal. guns (in 3 twin Mk 38 mounts); 12 × 40 mm Bofors AA guns (2 × 4, 2 × 2); 11 × 20 mm Oerlikon AA guns; 2 × Depth charge tracks; 4 × K-gun depth charge projectors; 80 × mines

The Robert H. Smith class of destroyer minelayers was built by the United States during World War II. The class was named for naval officer Robert H. Smith.

These vessels were all originally laid down as Allen M. Sumner-class destroyers and converted during construction in 1944. In that time the United States produced twelve Robert H. Smith-class destroyer minelayers. Their original hull numbers were DD-735-40, 749–51, and 771–73. None of the Robert H. Smith-class vessels ever laid a mine in wartime, though they were frequently employed in minesweeping. Minelayers did not carry torpedo tubes. Otherwise they were used interchangeably with other destroyer types. As radar pickets at Okinawa, Aaron Ward, Lindsey, and J. William Ditter were damaged by kamikazes, and Shea by a Baka bomb. Five of the class served actively in the 1950s, but all survivors were mothballed by the end of the decade and were disposed of in the 1970s. None of this class received FRAM conversions.

== Ships in class ==
Ship name	Hull no.	Builder	Laid down	Launched	Commissioned	Decommissioned	Fate
Robert H. Smith	DM-23 (ex-DD-735)	Bath Iron Works, Bath, Maine	10 January 1944	25 May 1944	4 August 1944	29 January 1947	Struck, 26 February 1971
Thomas E. Fraser	DM-24 (ex-DD-736)	Bath Iron Works, Bath, Maine	31 January 1944	10 June 1944	22 August 1944	12 September 1955	Sold for scrap, 12 June 1974
Shannon	DM-25 (ex-DD-737)	Bath Iron Works, Bath, Maine	14 February 1944	24 June 1944	8 September 1944	24 October 1955	Sold for scrap, May 1973
Harry F. Bauer	DM-26 (ex-DD-738)	Bath Iron Works, Bath, Maine	6 March 1944	9 July 1944	22 September 1944	12 March 1956	Sold for scrap, 1 June 1974
Adams	DM-27 (ex-DD-739)	Bath Iron Works, Bath, Maine	20 March 1944	23 July 1944	10 October 1944	December 1946	Sold for scrap, 16 December 1971
Tolman	DM-28 (ex-DD-740)	Bath Iron Works, Bath, Maine	10 April 1944	13 August 1944	27 October 1944	29 January 1947	Sunk as a target 25 January 1997
Henry A. Wiley	DM-29 (ex-DD-749)	Bethlehem Staten Island, Staten Island, New York	28 November 1943	21 April 1944	31 August 1944	29 January 1947	Sold for scrap, 30 May 1972
Shea	DM-30 (ex-DD-750)	Bethlehem Staten Island, Staten Island, New York	23 December 1943	20 May 1944	30 September 1944	9 April 1958	Sold for scrap, 1 September 1974
J. William Ditter	DM-31 (ex-DD-751)	Bethlehem Staten Island, Staten Island, New York	25 January 1944	4 July 1944	28 October 1944	28 September 1945	Scrapped, July 1946
Lindsey	DM-32 (ex-DD-771)	Bethlehem Shipbuilding, San Pedro, California, Terminal Island	12 September 1943	5 March 1944	20 August 1944	25 May 1946	Sunk as a target 1 May 1972
Gwin	DM-33 (ex-DD-772)	Bethlehem Shipbuilding, San Pedro, California, Terminal Island	31 October 1943	9 April 1944	30 September 1944	3 September 1946	Transferred to Turkey 15 August 1971
Gwin	DM-33 (ex-DD-772)	Bethlehem Shipbuilding, San Pedro, California, Terminal Island	31 October 1943	9 April 1944	8 July 1952	3 April 1958	Transferred to Turkey 15 August 1971
Aaron Ward	DM-34 (ex-DD-773)	Bethlehem Shipbuilding, San Pedro, California, Terminal Island	12 December 1943	5 May 1944	28 October 1944	28 September 1945	Stricken 11 October 1945; sold for scrap 1946

== Earlier Destroyer Minelayer (DM) conversions ==
The previous DM-classed vessels were all conversions from earlier flush-deck destroyers of WW1 vintage.

Ship name	Hull no.	Converted to DM	Fate
Stribling	DM-1 (ex-DD-96)	17 July 1920	Stricken 1 December 1936; target 20 July 1937
Murray	DM-2 (ex-DD-97)	17 July 1920	Stricken 7 January 1936
Israel	DM-3 (ex-DD-98)	17 July 1920	Stricken 25 January 1936
Luce	DM-4 (ex-DD-99)	17 July 1920	Stricken 7 January 1936
Maury	DM-5 (ex-DD-100)	17 July 1920	Stricken 22 October 1930
Lansdale	DM-6 (ex-DD-101)	17 July 1920	Stricken 25 January 1936
Mahan	DM-7 (ex-DD-102)	17 July 1920	Stricken 22 October 1930
Hart	DM-8 (ex-DD-110)	17 July 1920	Stricken 11 November 1931
Ingraham	DM-9 (ex-DD-111)	17 July 1920	Stricken 1 December 1936; target 23 July 1937
Ludlow	DM-10 (ex-DD-112)	17 July 1920	Stricken 18 November 1930
Burns	DM-11 (ex-DD-171)	March 1921	Sold 22 April 1932
Anthony	DM-12 (ex-DD-172)	July 1920	Stricken 1 December 1936; target 22 July 1937
Sproston	DM-13 (ex-DD-173)	July 1920	Stricken 1 December 1936; target 20 July 1937
Rizal	DM-14 (ex-DD-174)	July 1920	Stricken 11 November 1931
Gamble	DM-15 (ex-DD-123)	June 1930	Scuttled 16 July 1945
Ramsay	DM-16 (ex-DD-124)	June 1930	Stricken 13 November 1945
Montgomery	DM-17 (ex-DD-121)	January 1931	Stricken 28 April 1945
Breese	DM-18 (ex-DD-122)	January 1931	Sold 16 May 1946
Tracy	DM-19 (ex-DD-214)	January 1937	Stricken 7 February 1946
Preble	DM-20 (ex-DD-345)	June 1937	Stricken 3 January 1946
Sicard	DM-21 (ex-DD-346)	June 1937	Stricken 19 December 1945
Pruitt	DM-22 (ex-DD-347)	une 1937	Stricken 5 December 1945

== See also ==
- USS Terror
- Abdiel Class
- French cruiser Pluton
- HMS Adventure (M23)

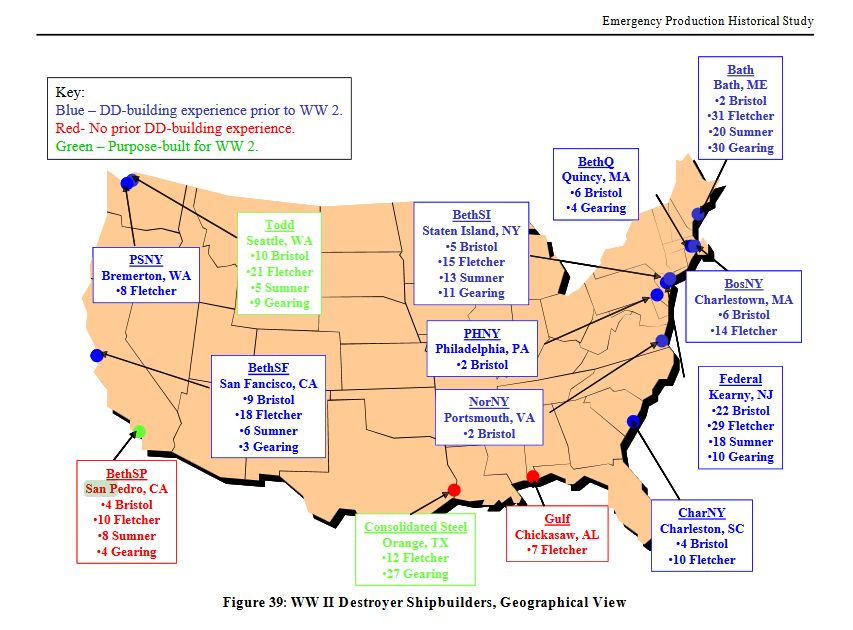
World War II destroyer shipbuilders map from Department of Defense (DoD)
