= USS Thomas E. Fraser =

Robert H. Smith-class destroyer minelayer

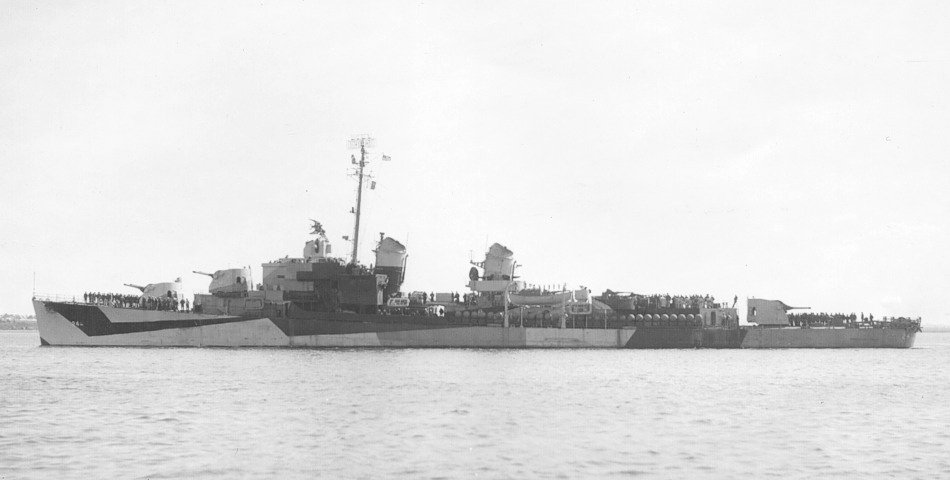
- USS Thomas E. Fraser off Boston in September 1944

History

United States
- Name: Thomas E. Fraser
- Namesake: Thomas E. Fraser
- Builder: Bath Iron Works, Bath, Maine
- Laid down: 31 January 1944
- Launched: 10 June 1944
- Commissioned: 22 August 1944
- Decommissioned: 12 September 1955
- Stricken: 1 November 1970
- Fate: Scrapped 1 June 1974

General characteristics
- Class & type: Robert H. Smith-class destroyer
- Displacement: 2,200 tons
- Length: 376 ft 6 in (114.76 m)
- Beam: 40 ft 10 in (12.45 m)
- Draft: 18 ft 10 in (5.74 m)
- Speed: 34 knots (63 km/h; 39 mph)
- Complement: 363 officers and enlisted
- Armament: 6 × 5 in (127 mm)/38 cal. guns; 12 × 40 mm guns; 8 × 20 mm guns; 2 depth charge tracks; 4 depth charge projectors

USS Thomas E. Fraser (DD-736/DM-24) was a Robert H. Smith-class destroyer minelayer in the United States Navy.

== Namesake ==
Thomas Edward Fraser was born on 6 February 1901 in Stafford Springs, Connecticut. He was appointed to the United States Naval Academy on 3 September 1920. After graduating on 4 June 1924, he served on the USS Wyoming for nearly a year and studied torpedo warfare at the Naval Torpedo Station, Newport, Rhode Island, before reporting for duty on board USS Worden on 17 January 1926. He served on that destroyer until 1 May 1930. Following assignments on USS Ellis and at the New York Navy Yard, Fraser reported on 1 March 1934 for duties in connection with the fitting out of USS Tuscaloosa. Assignments to the Philadelphia and Portsmouth Navy Yards followed in the late 1930s. During 1940 and 1941, he briefly commanded, in turn, destroyers USS Yarnall, USS Claxton and USS Broome.

On 10 November 1941, he became commanding officer of USS Walke and on 20 August 1942, he was appointed to the temporary rank of Commander. On the night of 14 and 15 November 1942, Walke was a part of Rear Admiral Willis Augustus Lee's Task Force 64, when it encountered a large Imperial Japanese Navy force off Savo Island attempting to bring reinforcements to Guadalcanal. Acting as the senior commander of the four destroyers of the task force, Fraser led them into action against the numerically superior Japanese force in the Second Naval Battle of Guadalcanal. The torpedoes and heavy gunfire of the Japanese vessels took a devastating toll on the American destroyers and shortly after midnight, Fraser gave the order to abandon the Walke. He was lost in the ensuing action and was posthumously awarded the Navy Cross.

== Construction and commissioning ==
Thomas E. Fraser was laid down as an Allen M. Sumner-class destroyer, DD-736, on 31 January 1944 at Bath, Maine, by the Bath Iron Works; named Thomas E. Fraser on 1 March 1944; launched on 10 June 1944; sponsored by Mrs. Thomas E. Fraser. The ship was reclassified as a destroyer minelayer and redesignated DM-24 on 20 July 1944; and commissioned on 22 August 1944.

== Service history ==
=== World War II ===
Following shakedown training out of Bermuda and mine warfare training out of Yorktown, Virginia, Thomas E. Fraser departed Norfolk, Virginia on 27 November and proceeded, via the Panama Canal Zone, to the west coast, arriving at San Diego, California on 12 December. After five days of intensive exercises off San Clemente Island, Thomas E. Fraser departed the California coast, steaming in company with Shannon and Harry F. Bauer. On 21 December, the destroyer minelayers rendezvoused with two transports and entered Pearl Harbor on 26 December. Thomas E. Fraser devoted the last days of 1944 and most of January 1945 to intensive exercises in the Hawaiian Islands to prepare for her role in the forthcoming assault on Iwo Jima.

=== Battle of Iwo Jima ===
On 27 January, Thomas E. Fraser got underway to screen Task Group 51.11 (TG 51.11) as it proceeded via Eniwetok to the Marianas Islands. On 11 February, she reached Saipan, the final staging point for the operation. On 16 February, the force sortied for Iwo Jima. Two hours before dawn on D-day, 19 February, the ship left the convoy screen to make an antisubmarine sweep through the transport area off the southern beaches of Iwo Jima. At 06:15, she completed the patrol and proceeded to take station in the anchorage screen.

After protecting the transports during the original landings, the minelayer proceeded in mid-afternoon to a fire support sector southeast of Mount Suribachi. At 17:37 — only 1,000 yards (910 m) from the nearest beach—she began delivering call fire under the direction of a shore fire control party. She poured in 5-inch gunfire on enemy machinegun and mortar nests on the northeast base of the formidable mountain. Shortly before sunset, she shifted her fire to positions in the caves near the base of Mount Suribachi. Japanese machinegunners on shore fired on the ship but did no damage. That evening, Thomas E. Fraser moved to a position southwest of Mount Suribachi and delivered call fire and illumination rounds throughout the night. Her star shells made it possible for Marine mortars to foil a Japanese attempt to infiltrate an American position via the sea. In the days that followed, Thomas E. Fraser alternated anchorage screening duties with fire support missions to assist Marines fighting ashore. Early on the morning of 21 February, as Thomas E. Fraser was firing on the northeast base of Mount Suribachi, a near miss by a large shell of undetermined origin caused a hole in her starboard side just below the main deck. Nevertheless, she continued firing on targets of opportunity until late in the afternoon when she returned to anchorage patrol.

During a dusk air raid alert on 23 February, Thomas E. Fraser opened fire on a Japanese airplane as it passed down the port side of the ship, but the raider disappeared, apparently unharmed.

Thomas E. Fraser remained off Iwo Jima through the first week in March, providing screening for the transports and fire support for the marines fighting ashore. She scored hits on enemy supply dumps, machinegun nests, and entrenchments, and knocked out numerous gun emplacements. At night, she often fired star shells or delivered harassment fire.

On 8 March, with the help of a plane spotter, her 5-inch guns scored three direct hits on a Japanese blockhouse. Shortly before sunset that day, she departed that battle-torn island, escorting USS Lakewood Victory.

=== Battle of Okinawa ===
Arriving at Ulithi on 11 March, the minelayer remained in the lagoon for eight days for upkeep, provisioning, and ammunition replenishment. On 19 March, she got underway in company with Mine Group 2 and steamed for the Ryukyu Islands. Before dawn on 25 March, the minesweepers began sweep operations — part of the large scale American efforts to prepare the waters of the Nansei Shoto for the planned assaults on Kerama Retto and Okinawa. The destroyer minelayer (DM) followed in the wake of the minesweepers, directing their movements and providing fire support. On that day, she fired at shore targets on a number of smaller islands of the Okinawa Gunto, observing direct hits. On 27 March, she fired at targets on the main island of Okinawa. The destroyer minelayer did not retire with the minesweeping group that evening but took up a patrol station off Okinawa and, throughout the night, fired illumination and harassment rounds on the island's southern beaches.

In the early hours of 29 March, Thomas E. Fraser fired on an attacking Mitsubishi G4M "Betty" bomber, bringing the Japanese plane down in flames. Air attacks became more frequent in the last days of March; and, after midnight on 31 March, the warship drove off an attack by a single Japanese plane. Minutes later, a dive bomber attacked. Hit by 5-inch gunfire from the ship, the enemy aircraft passed overhead and splashed astern. At 03:20, a low flying floatplane appeared without warning, dropped a bomb which exploded just off Thomas E. Fraser's port quarter, and disappeared into the night before the ship could fire a single shot. The DM continued her support and direction of the minesweeping group until the completion of its assigned sweeps later that day, then took up her station off Kerama Retto as an anchorage screening vessel.

While screening Mine Division 7 southwest of Kerama Retto on 2 April, the warship took two planes under fire in quick succession, repelling the first and hitting the second with automatic weapons fire as it passed overhead. The attacker burst into flame and splashed. As dawn approached, the ship fired on other aircraft but scored no more hits. After taking on ammunition at Kerama Retto that afternoon, Thomas E. Fraser got underway to join a transport task unit for night retirement. As the warship approached the convoy, seven "Bettys" attacked. Antiaircraft fire from the convoy and its escort downed four enemy planes. However, USS Henrico — five miles away — took a bomb hit; and a kamikaze found its mark on the fantail of transport USS Goodhue.

Thomas E. Fraser continued screening duties off Kerama Retto until 5 April when she got underway to help escort a convoy of transports to Saipan. En route, orders arrived detaching her from the convoy; and she proceeded with USS Bache to Guam where they arrived on 8 April.

Following the installation of a new radar antenna, Thomas E. Fraser moved to Saipan on 18 April and, two days later, headed back toward the Ryukyus with a convoy of tank landing ships. After conducting the convoy to a dispersal point off Nakagusuku Wan, the destroyer minelayer took up a screening station off the southern coast of Okinawa. On 28 April, a Japanese plane dove in low from the direction of the island, launched a torpedo which missed the ship, and escaped despite heavy antiaircraft fire. After dark, the ship repelled an enemy air raid and then steamed to assist a hospital ship which had been hit by a Japanese kamikaze. Finding USS Comfort damaged but proceeding under her own power, Thomas E. Fraser escorted the vessel to Guam where they arrived on 3 May.

The light minelayer was next ordered back to Okinawa to strengthen the thinning ranks of American destroyers on radar picket duty off that island. Steaming on her starboard screw while her port engine was being repaired, the warship left Apra Harbor on 4 May and arrived off Okinawa on 7 May to resume screening and radar picket duties. While operating in the transport screen off Hagushi Beach on 12 May, she helped to fight off a swarm of Japanese kamikazes during the raid in which one crashed into the battleship USS New Mexico.

Throughout the month, she alternated radar picket duty off Okinawa with maintenance and replenishment at Kerama Retto and Hagushi. Late in the day on 24 May, Thomas E. Fraser greeted the first planes of a concerted air attack from the north with gunfire and crashed one of her attackers on le Shima. The attack continued into the early hours of 25 May and was at last dispersed after 10 hours and 7 minutes. The ship then spent five days at Kerama Retto for the installation of fighter direction equipment and, on 30 May, resumed her picket duties southwest of Okinawa. As she steamed on station shortly before sunset on 1 June, two low-flying torpedo bombers made a surprise torpedo attack. Thomas E. Fraser successfully maneuvered to avoid the torpedoes dropped by the planes and joined the picket group in engaging the intruders.

On 6 June, Thomas E. Fraser relieved USS J. William Ditter, the badly battered target of a mass kamikaze attack, on picket station. Two days later, she returned to Kerama Retto and began preparations for a new assignment — hydrographic survey and sweeping operations between Kerama Retto and Sakishima Gunto. Operating mainly as a buoy planting ship, the destroyer minelayer accompanied minesweepers in the southern Nansei Shoto throughout June, returning twice to Kerama Retto to load radar buoys and undergo engineering maintenance. Toward sunset on 21 June, as she lay at anchor in Kerama Retto, Thomas E. Fraser took under fire an enemy plane which had penetrated the screen and had dropped a bomb on the forecastle of nearby USS Curtiss. Joining in the firing, the DM scored an assist when the Japanese plane splashed not far from the seaplane tender.

Into August, Thomas E. Fraser operated out of Buckner Bay, Okinawa, planting buoys to guide mine sweeping units clearing the East China Sea. After hostilities ceased, she steamed north to rendezvous with the 3rd Fleet. Delays kept the victorious forces hovering off the coast of Honshū for several days. On 25 August, the task force began its approach to Tokyo; and, on 27 August, Thomas E. Fraser patrolled Sagami Wan. On the morning of 28 August, she supported USS Ellyson and USS Hambleton as they helped to sweep the channel in preparation for the entry of cruiser USS San Diego into Tokyo Bay. She ended August supporting minesweepers clearing the Okinoyama minefield and was in Tokyo Bay on 2 September when the peace was signed on board USS Missouri.

=== 1945 ===
In September, the minelayer operated with sweep units clearing mines in Kii Suido, in Wakayama anchorage, and off the Pacific coast of the Japanese islands. While anchored in Wakanoura Wan on 17 and 18 September, she weathered a typhoon whose 100 knots (190 km/h; 120 mph) gusts forced her to use her engine to ease the strain on her anchor. When the storm abated, she sent out a party to aid survivors and to remove confidential gear and publications from YMS-478 which had broached and capsized.

She continued off the Japanese coast into October. Following a week at Buckner Bay, she got underway on 25 October for a new sweep area in the East China Sea. Assigned to lay buoys and to assist in navigation, the warship operated in the northern reaches of the East China Sea into November. On 17 November, she put in at Sasebo for fuel and upkeep. On 1 December, she broke out her homeward-bound pennant, and the next day departed Japan, steaming via Eniwetok and Pearl Harbor, and arriving in San Diego on 22 December.

=== 1946 – 1955 ===
On 26 December, she got underway and steamed via the Panama Canal Zone to Norfolk, Virginia, arriving there on 8 January 1946. Late in March, the destroyer minelayer put in at Charleston, South Carolina for overhaul and remained in that port until late in the year when she participated in a reserve training cruise with USS Wisconsin which continued into January 1947. From February until May, she operated out of various Caribbean ports; then returned to Norfolk. On the last day of June, she departed Hampton Roads; steamed to Recife, Brazil; then proceeded on to the African port of Monrovia for a courtesy and good-will visit during Liberia's centennial celebration. After stopping at Senegal, she returned to the east coast on 16 August.

The destroyer minelayer continued operations off the Atlantic coast ranging as far north as NS Argentia, Newfoundland and as far south as the Caribbean. On 1 December 1947, she was immobilized; but she was again back in service by May 1949. Following local operations out of Guantanamo Bay in July, the ship departed Hampton Roads early in August and called at Cherbourg, France, before returning to the Caribbean where she remained until she returned to Charleston in November.

In September 1950, she broke the routine of training operations off the east coast with a Mediterranean Sea deployment which continued until 22 January 1951 when she departed Oran. In June, she was again underway for European ports, this time on a midshipman cruise which took her to Copenhagen, Plymouth, and Lisbon. In July, she visited Cuba before returning to the east coast. For the next three years, she varied exercises off the Atlantic coast and in the Caribbean with brief voyages to Europe.

In February 1955, she engaged in mine planting off Key West, Florida in support of a fleet service mine test program, one of her last assignments. On 10 June 1955, she was placed in reserve; and, on 12 September 1955, she was decommissioned and placed in reserve at Portsmouth Naval Shipyard. Her name was struck from the Navy list on 1 November 1970 and she was scrapped on 1 June 1974 at the Philadelphia Navy Yard.

Thomas E. Fraser received three battle stars for World War II service.

As of 2009, no other ship in the United States Navy has been named Thomas E. Fraser.
