= USS Adams (DM-27) =

Robert H. Smith-class destroyer minelayer

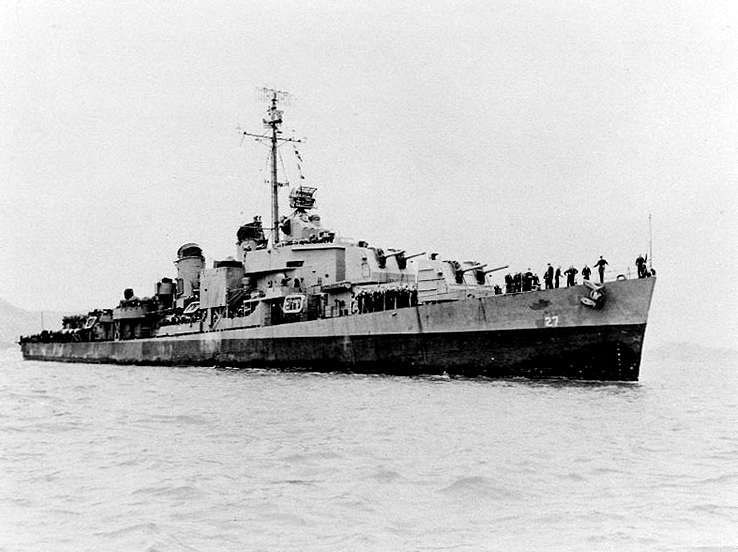
- Adams off San Francisco, California, 2 May 1945.

History

United States
- Name: Adams
- Namesake: Samuel Adams
- Builder: Bath Iron Works
- Laid down: 20 March 1944 as Destroyer (DD-739)
- Launched: 23 July 1944
- Commissioned: 10 October 1944
- Decommissioned: December 1946
- Reclassified: 20 July 1944 as Destroyer Minelayer DM-27; 1 January 1969 as Fast Minelayer MMD-27
- Stricken: 1 December 1970
- Fate: Sold for scrapping, 16 December 1971

General characteristics
- Class & type: Robert H. Smith-class destroyer
- Displacement: 2,200 tons
- Length: 376 ft 6 in (114.76 m)
- Beam: 40 ft 10 in (12.45 m)
- Draft: 18 ft 10 in (5.74 m)
- Speed: 34 knots (63 km/h; 39 mph)
- Complement: 363 officers and enlisted
- Armament: 6 x 5 in (127 mm)/38 cal. guns; 12 x 40 mm guns; 8 x 20 mm cannons; 2 x depth charge tracks; 4 x depth charge projectors; 80 mines

USS Adams (DM-27) was a destroyer minelayer in the United States Navy. She was named for Lieutenant, junior grade Samuel Adams. The other two USS Adams that have existed were named after the second president.

Adams was laid down as DD-739, an Allen M. Sumner-class destroyer, on 20 March 1944 at the Bath Iron Works in Bath, Maine. She was redesignated a Robert H. Smith-class destroyer minelayer DM-27, on 20 July 1944; launched on 23 July 1944, sponsored by Mrs. Maude Ryan Adams, the widow of Lieutenant Adams. Adams was commissioned at Boston, Massachusetts, on 10 October 1944.

== Service history ==
=== World War II ===
After fitting out there, she embarked upon her shakedown cruise on 1 November. That cruise, which took her to Bermuda waters, lasted for the entire month. On 29 November, she headed back toward the United States and arrived at Norfolk, Virginia, on 3 December. Following post-shakedown availability in the navy yard there, she put to sea on 11 December with Shea, bound for New York City and a rendezvous with Bennington. The two destroyer minelayers departed New York with the aircraft carrier on 15 December and set a course for the Panama Canal. The three warships transited the canal on 20 December and, on 22 December, headed for the California coast. They arrived at San Diego on 29 December and remained there two days undergoing repairs. On New Year's Day 1945, they got underway again, headed for Oahu, and they arrived in Pearl Harbor six days later.

For almost two months, Adams remained in the Hawaiian operating area. During that time, she acted as plane guard for Bataan while the carrier conducted carrier landing qualifications for naval aviators. She also carried out gunnery exercises and shore bombardment practice. The warship spent two periods in the Pearl Harbor Navy Yard—once for the installation of VF radar equipment and again to have her main deck plating strengthened. Early in February, she laid mines and tested mine detection equipment on them. Later, the warship conducted mine laying exercises. She finished out her tour of duty in the Hawaii area late in February with another plane guard mission with Bataan.

The destroyer minelayer stood out of Pearl Harbor on 2 March, bound for the western Pacific. She arrived in Ulithi Atoll on 14 March and remained until 19 March, when she put to sea with a task group of the Okinawa invasion force. The warship saw her first combat on 23 March, the day before she arrived off Okinawa. That evening, enemy aircraft attacked her task group. Adams sustained her first casualties when a projectile fired from the after five-inch mount exploded prematurely killing two sailors and injuring another 13. At dawn the following day, she began minesweeping operations off Okinawa. The destroyer minelayer provided gunfire support and mine destruction services to the wooden-hulled minesweepers doing the actual sweeping.

Those operations continued over the next few days in spite of Japanese air resistance. During that time, she was attacked by at least twelve different planes. She confirmed six kills and claimed probable kills of two others. On 28 March, one of those attackers splashed about 25 ft (7.6 m) from her port bow showering her with debris and gasoline.

She sustained damage in a collision with a salvage vessel that forced her into the anchorage at Kerama Retto for emergency repairs. On 1 April, while she was operating to the southeast of Kerama Retto, a badly damaged Japanese plane splashed close aboard her stern; and what must have been two bombs exploded under her fantail causing severe damage and jamming her rudders at hard right. While she steamed in righthand circles, two more kamikaze planes swooped in at her. Adams destroyed one while the other succumbed to the antiaircraft battery on Mullany, the ship dispatched to assist Adams. Later, Adams was towed into Kerama Retto to begin temporary repairs alongside Endymion.

Adams departed Kerama Retto on 7 April, bound ultimately for the United States and permanent repairs. She made stops at Guam and at Pearl Harbor before arriving at the Mare Island Navy Yard on 7 May. She completed repairs and post-repair trials and calibrations during the first week in July. On 6 July, she put to sea for exercises off Santa Catalina, CA and entered port at San Diego on 10 July. After brief post-repair shakedown training and inspections, the destroyer minelayer stood out of San Diego on 17 July on her way back to Hawaii. She arrived at Oahu on 23 July and spent the next 11 days in gunnery exercises—both antiaircraft and shore bombardment—in the Hawaiian operating area.

On 4 August, she and Koiner departed Pearl Harbor, bound for the western Pacific. The two warships stopped overnight on 11/12 August at Eniwetok Atoll where they picked up Sitka. They escorted the attack transport to the Marianas and arrived at Guam on 15 August, the day hostilities ceased.

=== Post war ===
The following day, she got underway for Okinawa, arrived in Buckner Bay on 18 August, and remained there through 31 August. On 1 September, she stood out of Buckner Bay on her way to Japan. She arrived off Kagoshima, Kyūshū, on 3 September and began sweeping a channel into the port. That operation continued until 9 September at which time she headed back toward Okinawa. She reached Buckner Bay on 11 September and re mained at anchor until 16 September. On that day, she put to sea to evade a typhoon but returned to port on 18 September.

She departed Okinawa again on 24 September, headed for Japan, and arrived in Ise Wan, Honshū, on 26 September, and began minesweeping operations in preparation for the landing of Army troops at Nagoya. She anchored in Ise Wan on 28 September and remained there while her commanding officer, serving as task group commander, directed the minesweeping mission. She remained at Ise Wan through the end of October. On 1 November, the destroyer minelayer laid a course for Sasebo where she arrived two days later. She stayed there through most of November provisioning units preparing to return home.

On 25 November, Adams left Sasebo to voyage to Kiirun, Taiwan, where she arrived on 28 November and reported for duty with Task Group (TG) 70.5. She returned to sea with TG 70.5 on 4 December for a 10-day minesweeping assignment in Taiwan Strait. At the conclusion of that mission, she returned to Kiirun on 15 December. Four days later, she put to sea with a convoy bound for Shanghai, China, and entered the Yangtze River on 21 December. Adams remained at Shanghai until 3 January 1946. Between 3 and 6 January, the warship voyaged back, to Sasebo where she rejoined the 5th Fleet.

Adams continued similar duty in Far Eastern waters until early April when she headed back to the United States. Upon her arrival home, she was assigned to the 1st Fleet and served in it until decommissioned in December. The destroyer minelayer was berthed with the San Diego Group, Pacific Reserve Fleet. She remained in reserve for almost 23 years. On 7 February 1955, while still in reserve, she was redesignated a fast minelayer MMD-27. Her name was finally struck from the Navy List on 1 December 1970, and she was sold to Chow's Iron & Steel Company, of Taiwan, on 16 December 1971.

== Awards ==
Adams earned one battle star for World War II service.
