= William Anthony (USMC) =

United States Marine

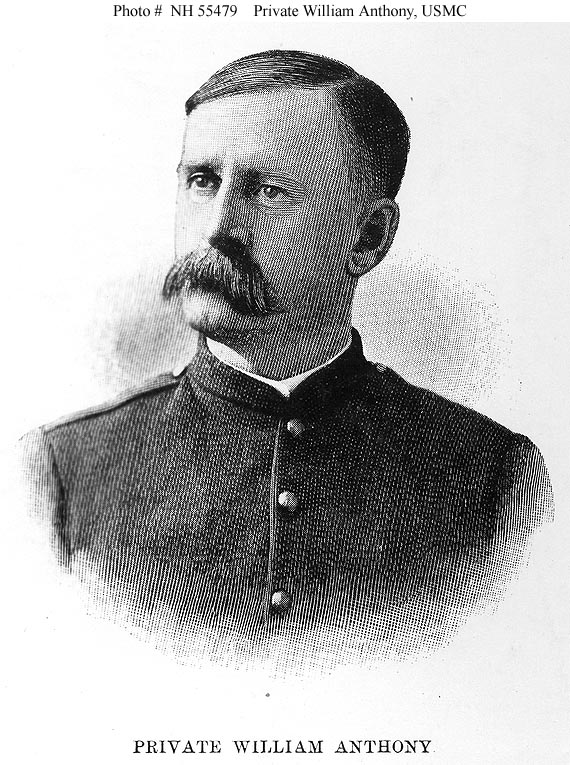
- Sergeant Major William Anthony, USMC
- Born: October 27, 1853; Albany, New York
- Died: November 24, 1899 (aged 46); New York City
- Military career
- Allegiance: United States of America
- Branch: United States Marine Corps
- Service years: 1875–1885 (U.S. Army); 1885–1899 (USMC)
- Rank: Sergeant Major
- Nickname: "The Nation's Hero"
- Conflicts: Spanish–American War; *Sinking of the Maine

William Anthony (October 27, 1853 – November 24, 1899) was a soldier in the United States Army and a Marine in the United States Marine Corps, who served during the Spanish–American War.

== Biography ==
Born in Albany, New York, Anthony enlisted in the Army on February 1, 1875, and served two five-year enlistments before joining the Marine Corps at Brooklyn, New York, on July 18, 1885. He served ashore (at the New York Navy Yard) and afloat (in the armored cruiser Brooklyn) before reporting for duty on May 12, 1897, in the Marine guard of the battleship Maine.

An explosion rocked Maine as she lay at anchor in Havana Harbor on the night of February 15, 1898. As she began to settle, Private Anthony, who was on watch at the time, hastened immediately forward toward the captain's cabin to inform him of the event. In the darkness, the Marine bumped into Captain Charles D. Sigsbee as the latter groped his way toward the outer hatch of the superstructure. Anthony apologized and made his report "that the ship has blown up and is sinking." The two men then proceeded together toward the quarterdeck.

"The special feature in this case of service performed by Private Anthony," Sigsbee later recounted in a letter to John D. Long, the Secretary of the Navy, "is that, on an occasion when a man's instinct would lead him to safety outside the ship, he started into the superstructure and toward the cabin, irrespective of the danger. Maine's former captain then recommended that the Marine be promoted to sergeant, which was accomplished on April 14, 1898.

Anthony had meanwhile joined the Marine guard of the cruiser Detroit on March 5, 1898, and served in that ship until transferred to duty at the Marine Barracks, New York Navy Yard, on September 10, of that year. Upon expiration of his enlistment, Anthony was honorably discharged at New York on June 26, 1899, with the rank of sergeant major.

Anthony died in New York City on November 24, 1899, and was buried at Evergreens Cemetery in Brooklyn five days later.

== Namesake ==
USS Anthony (DD-172) and USS Anthony (DD-515) were named for him.
