= USS Walke (DD-416) =

Sims-class destroyer

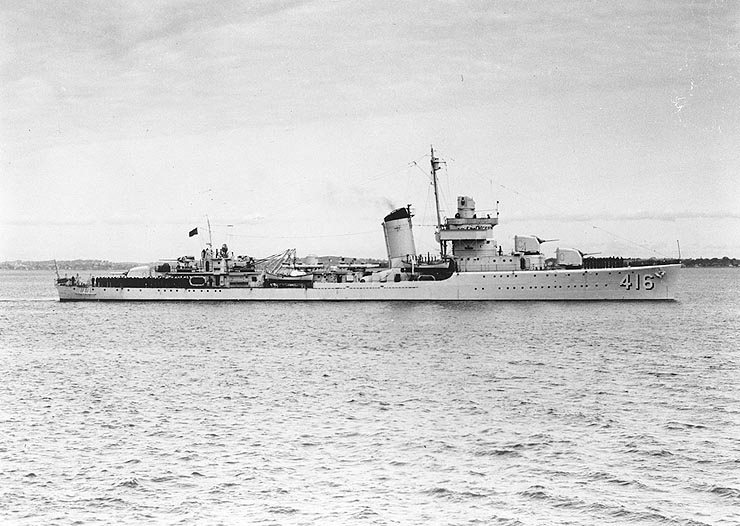
- Walke soon after completion, circa 1940

History

United States
- Name: Walke
- Builder: Boston Navy Yard
- Laid down: 31 May 1938
- Launched: 20 October 1939
- Commissioned: 27 April 1940
- Stricken: 13 January 1943
- Identification: DD-416
- Honors and awards: American Defense Service Medal ("Fleet" clasp, "A" device), Asiatic-Pacific Campaign Medal (3 stars), World War II Victory Medal
- Fate: Sunk in Naval Battle of Guadalcanal on 15 November 1942

General characteristics
- Class & type: Sims-class destroyer
- Displacement: 1,570 long tons (1,600 t) (std); 2,211 long tons (2,246 t) (full)
- Length: 348 ft 3 1/4 in (106.2 m)
- Beam: 36 ft 1 in (11.0 m)
- Draft: 13 ft 4.5 in (4.1 m)
- Propulsion: High-pressure super-heated boilers; Geared turbines with twin screws; 50,000 hp (37,000 kW)
- Speed: 35 knots (65 km/h; 40 mph)
- Range: 3,660 nmi (6,780 km; 4,210 mi) at 20 kn (37 km/h; 23 mph)
- Complement: 192 (10 officers/182 enlisted)
- Armament: 5 × 5 inch/38, in single mounts; 4 × .50 caliber/90, in single mounts; 8 × 21 inch torpedo tubes in two quadruple mounts; 2 × depth charge track, 10 depth charges
- Armor: None

USS Walke (DD-416) was a World War II-era Sims-class destroyer in the service of the United States Navy, named after Rear Admiral Henry A. Walke USN (1809–1896). Walke operated with the Neutrality Patrol in the Caribbean before World War II and fought in the Pacific Theater during the war before being sunk in the Naval Battle of Guadalcanal.

Walke was laid down by the Naval Shipyard at Boston in Massachusetts on 31 May 1938, launched on 20 October 1939 by Mrs. Clarence Dillon, grandniece of Rear Admiral Walke and commissioned on 27 April 1940.

== Service history ==
=== Inter-War period ===
Following fitting-out and engineering trials, Walke took on board torpedoes, warheads, and exercise warheads at the Naval Torpedo Station, Newport, Rhode Island, on 25 June and sailed for Norfolk, Virginia, on the following day. She reached Norfolk on 27 June and there embarked Second Lieutenant Donald B. Cooley, USMC, and 47 enlisted marines for transportation to Wichita, then in South American waters. Later that same day, in company with Wainwright, Walke got underway for Cuba.

After fueling at Guantanamo on 4 July, Walke got underway for Rio de Janeiro, Brazil, at 0658 on 6 July, again in company with Wainwright, En route, the destroyers were diverted to the mouth of the Surinam River, where Walke took on board an appendicitis patient from Wainwright for passage to Paramaribo for medical attention. After transferring the patient, Pvt. Lawrence P. Coghlan, USMC, ashore, Walke got underway for Pará, Brazil, where she fueled before pushing on for Rio de Janeiro.

Walke and Wainwright reached Rio on 19 July. Walke then transferred her marine passengers, half of the heavy cruiser's marine detachment, to Wichita while Wainwright transferred hers to Quincy. Due to unsettled conditions in the area, the two cruisers were in South American waters, "showing the flag" and evidencing strong American interest in the "good neighbors" south of the border.

Still operating in company with her sister ship, Walke visited Rio Grande do Sul, Brazil; Buenos Aires, Argentina; Santos and Bahia, Brazil, and made a return call to Buenos Aires before rendezvousing with Quincy and Wichita on 15 August. Walke took on board mail, freight, and embarked passengers from Wichita before getting underway and steaming via Bahia and Guantanamo Bay to the Boston Navy Yard where she arrived on the morning of 4 September. Walke underwent post-shakedown repairs for the rest of that month and all of October before she joined the United States Fleet as a unit of Destroyer Division 4, Destroyer Squadron 2, Patrol Force. In mid-November, she served as the vehicle for degaussing tests under the auspices of the Naval Ordnance Laboratory at Solomons Island, Maryland. Returning to Norfolk upon the conclusion of those tests, Walke set her course southward on 2 December, bound once more for Guantanamo Bay.

Walke's active service had begun in the spring of 1940, when Germany was unleashing her military might in Norway and the lowlands of western Europe to turn the so-called Phony War into the blitzkrieg which swept across northern France, driving British troops off the continent and knocking France out of the war. The resulting establishment of a new government in that country, more favorable to Germany, aroused fear in Allied and neutral circles that French fighting forces, particularly French warships, might be placed in German hands. Walke would have a role in seeing that this unfortunate development would never take place.

After fueling at San Juan on 6 December, the destroyer got underway on the afternoon of the following day on "Caribbean Patrol" in company with O'Brien. Rendezvousing with Moffett and Sims off Fort-de-France, Martinique, Walke and O’Brien patrolled the approaches to that port, keeping an eye on the movements of Vichy French warships Barfleur, Quercy, and Béarn, through 14 December. Walke then visited Castries, British West Indies, on 15 December and embarked Comdr. Lyman K. Swenson, Commander, Destroyer Division 17, who hoisted his pennant in her that day.

Walke put into Guantanamo Bay on 19 December 1940, and remained there into the new year, moored in a nest with Prairie, undergoing upkeep. In ensuing weeks, Walke operated in the Guantanamo Bay-Gonaïves, Haiti, areas, conducting battle and torpedo practices, engaging in a full slate of the training exercises assigned such ships in those areas. She then shifted to Fajardo, Puerto Rico, and operated from there through mid-March.

Walke then sailed north and arrived at Charleston, South Carolina, on 20 March 1941 for a period of repairs and alterations that lasted into May. She touched briefly at Norfolk between 10 and 13 May before reaching Newport, her base for the better part of the year, on the following day.

Walke then patrolled off the Atlantic coast between Norfolk and Newport well into June 1941 as the Atlantic Fleet's neutrality patrols were steadily extended eastward, closer to the European war zone. She departed Newport on 27 July and screened a convoy to Iceland, reaching Reykjavík on 6 August and turning toward Norfolk the same day, her charges safely delivered.

The destroyer subsequently returned to those northern climes in mid-September, after local operations in the Newport-Boston area — reaching Hvalfjörður on 14 September. She operated in Icelandic waters into late September, before she put into NS Argentia, Newfoundland, on 11 October, en route to Casco Bay, Maine.

=== World War II ===
Walke began an overhaul at the Boston Navy Yard on 25 November 1941 and completed it on 7 December 1941, the "day of infamy" on which Japan attacked Pearl Harbor and thrust the United States into war in the Pacific. Departing the yard on that day, Walke reached Norfolk on 12 December, via Casco Bay, and remained there until 16 December when she sailed for the Panama Canal and the Pacific

After reaching San Diego, California, on 30 December, Walke sailed with the newly formed Task Force 17 (TF17), bound for the South Pacific, on 6 January 1942, screening Yorktown as she covered the movement of reinforcements for the Marine garrison on American Samoa. The convoy subsequently arrived at Tutuila on 24 January. However, TF 17 remained in Samoan waters for only a short time, for it soon sailed north for the Marshall–Gilbert Islands area to deliver the first offensive blow to the enemy, only eight weeks after the bombing of Pearl Harbor.

Walke served in the antisubmarine screen and plane-guarded for the Yorktown as that carrier launched air strikes on suspected Japanese installations on the atolls of Jaluit, Makin, and Mili Atolls. Although Admiral Chester Nimitz, the Commander in Chief, Pacific Fleet (CinCPAC), considered the raids "well-conceived, well-planned, and brilliantly executed", the damage they actually caused was not as great as reported; and, outside the boost they gave to American morale, the attacks were only a minor nuisance to the Japanese. Nevertheless, the American Fleet had finally taken the war to the enemy.

Returning to Hawaiian waters on 7 February 1942, Walke trained in the Hawaiian area until 27 February, when she sailed for the Ellice Islands. She later exercised with TF 17 off New Caledonia in early March before she sailed, again screening Yorktown, for the New Guinea area, as part of the force put together to check Japanese expansion in that area.

By that time, the enemy advance to the southward, in the New Guinea-New Britain area, had gained considerable momentum with the occupation of Rabaul and Gasmata, New Britain; Kavieng, New Ireland; and on sites on Bougainville in the Solomon Islands and in the Louisiades. By the end of February 1942, it seemed probable that the Japanese were planning to mount an offensive in early March. TFs 11 and 17 were dispatched to the area. Vice Admiral Wilson Brown, in overall charge of the operation, initially selected Rabaul and Gasmata, in New Britain, and Kavieng, in New Ireland, as targets for the operation.

Walke then screened Yorktown as she launched air strikes on Tulagi in the Solomons on 4 May 1942 and later separated from that carrier with the "Support Force" (Australia, Hobart, Farragut and Perkins) to protect the southern mouth of the Jomard Passage. On the afternoon of 7 May, Japanese Aichi D3A Val dive bombers attacked the formation, but the heavy antiaircraft fire thrown up by the ships caused the enemy to retire without scoring any hits.

An hour after the Vals departed, however, Japanese twin-engined bombers appeared and made a torpedo attack from dead ahead. Again, a heavy volume of antiaircraft fire from Walke and the other destroyers peppered the skies. Five bombers splashed into the sea, and no torpedoes found their mark on the Allied ships. Later, 19 high altitude bombers passed over, dropping sticks of bombs that splashed harmlessly into the water. Antiaircraft fire proved ineffective, due to the high altitude maintained by the planes. However, the last group of planes were apparently American planes. The force commander, the Australian Rear Admiral John Crace, swore that the planes were Martin B-26 Marauders; Walke's commander, Commander Thomas E. Fraser, subsequently reported them to be B-17 Flying Fortresses. In any event, it was fortunate that the bombardiers were not too accurate.

On 7 March, Allied intelligence learned that a Japanese surface force, including transports, lay off Buna, Papua New Guinea. On the following day, Japanese troops went ashore at Lae and Salamaua, New Guinea, and secured those places by noon.

Three days later, Yorktown and Lexington launched air strikes against the newly established Japanese beachheads at Lae and Salamaua. The attack took the enemy by surprise. The planes from the two American flattops came in from over the Owen Stanley Mountains and inflicted damage on ships, small craft, and shore installations, before they retired.

Walke remained at sea with the Yorktown task force into April. Detached to escort Ramsay and Sumner, the destroyer reached Suva, in Fiji, on 19 April and got underway the next day, bound for the Tonga Islands. Reaching Tongatapu on 22 April, Walke fueled from Kaskaskia before she underwent boiler repairs and loaded depth charges prior to her return to TF 17.

Detached from the group because of a damaged starboard reduction gear, Walke headed to Australia for repairs and reached Brisbane on 12 May. Upon completion of the work on 29 May, the destroyer ran trials in the Brisbane River before being pronounced fit for service and sailed for New Caledonia on 9 June.

Arriving at Nouméa on 13 June, Walke fueled there before proceeding via Tongatapu to Pago Pago, American Samoa, Samoa. Assigned to Task Group 12.1 (TG 12.1), the destroyer sailed on 26 June for Bora Bora in the Society Islands. With the dissolution of TG 12.1 on 11 July, Walke then reported for duty to Commander, TG 6.7, the commanding officer of Castor. She then escorted Castor to San Francisco, California, arriving there on 2 August.

On 7 August, while Walke was undergoing repairs and alterations at the nearby Mare Island Navy Yard, the United States Navy wrested the initiative in the war from Japan by landing marines on Guadalcanal in the Solomon Islands. In ensuing months, the armed forces of the two nations struggled mightily for control of that island chain. The contest soon developed into a logistics race as each side tried to frustrate its opponent's efforts to reinforce and supply his forces fighting on Guadalcanal while doing all in his power to strengthen his own. Walke's future was to be inextricably tied to the almost daily, and nightly, American air and naval attempts to best the Japanese in their thrusts down New Georgia Sound the strategic body of water which stretches between the two lines of islands which make up the Solomons chain and lead to Guadalcanal.

Completing the yard work on 25 August, Walke ran her trials in San Francisco Bay and that day received orders to proceed to San Pedro, California, to rendezvous with the oiler Kankakee and escorted her from the west coast of the United States, via Nouméa, New Caledonia, to Tongatapu, arriving there on 9 September. The destroyer later escorted a convoy consisting of Kankakee, Navajo, and Arctic from Tongatapu to Nouméa, where she prepared for action in the Solomons.

==== Naval Battle of Guadalcanal ====
About sunset on 13 November 1942, the day after the Naval Battle of Guadalcanal began, Walke sortied with TF 64 which was built around Washington and South Dakota and, besides Walke, was screened by Preston, Gwin, and Benham. By late in the forenoon on 14 November, TF 64 had reached a point some 50 nmi (90 km) south-by-west from Guadalcanal.

Sighted by the enemy, who reported them as one battleship, one cruiser, and four destroyers, the American warships spent most of the day on 14 November avoiding contact with enemy planes. From the information available in dispatches, the commander of the American task force, Rear Admiral Willis A. Lee, knew of the presence of three groups of enemy ships in the area, one of which was formed around at least two battleships.

Proceeding through the flat calm sea and disposed in column formation with Walke leading, the American ships approached on a northerly course about nine miles (14 km) west of Guadalcanal.

Lee's ships continued making their passage, picking up Japanese voice transmissions on the radio while the ships' radar "eyes" scanned the darkness. At 0006 on 15 November, Washington received a report that indicated the presence of three ships, rounding the north end of Savo Island, headed westward. Almost simultaneously the flagship's radar picked up two ships on the same bearing.

Ten minutes later, Washington opened fire with her 16-inch (406 mm) guns; and, within seconds, South Dakota followed suit. Walke opened fire at 0026, maintaining a rapid barrage at what probably was Nagara. After checking fire within a few minutes, the lead destroyer opened up again at a Japanese destroyer 7,500 yards (6,900 m) to starboard (likely either Ayanami or Uranami) and, later, at gunflashes off her port side near Guadalcanal.

=== Sinking ===
Report of Action USS Walke (DD-416) 15 November 1942 (dated 30 November 1942 from Senior Officer Present - W.J. Collum Jr., Lieut. USN)

1. Task Force 64 engaged the enemy off Savo Island on the night of 14–15 November. US Forces formed in a column in the following order: WALKE, BENHAM, PRESTON, GWIN, WASHINGTON, SOUTH DAKOTA, under the command of USS WASHINGTON.

2. The wind was slight. Conditions of visibility were in general poor due to the enemy position close against shorelines of Salvo and Guadalcanal Islands. Radar ranges accurately obtainable only when enemy drew away from close island backgrounds.

3. Estimated order of events follows as all logs and records went down with the ship. The formations as described steamed on course 150 True between Florida and Savo Islands until approximately 00:20, reducing speed from 23 to 17 knots in search of the reported enemy. At 00:20 turned to course 270 True.

At 00:30 following action of WASHINGTON and South DAKOTA, WALKE opened fire to starboard on visible target believed to be a cruiser with a single raked stack. WALKE continued rapid fire on this target for two minutes with FOX DOG Radar range 11,000 yards. The target appeared to blow up under heavily concentrated fire. Our formation increased speed to 26 knots.

At 00:32 checked fired and shifted target to apparent enemy destroyer bearing one point on the starboard bow. Resumed rapid fire at the rage of 7,500 yards by Radar. Apparent straddled clearly visible followed by heavy black smoke. Flames were reported on the target as she disappeared behind the northwest point of Savo Island.

At 00:37 checked fire to shift target to port hand flashes of gunfire off Guadalcanal. Resumed rapid fire., Numerous gun flashes visible on starboard hand.

At 00:37 USS PRESTON blew up astern of WALKE.

At 00:39 attempted to shift torpedo battery from Curved Fire Ahead setup to Broadside Fire to Starboard when a heavy explosion occurred in the vicinity of frame 45 to starboard. WALKE had been straddled twice by gunfire immediately prior to this explosion caused by torpedo whose wake was observed. Following initial explosion, WALKE was struck by an apparent cruiser salvo. Shell hits were reported in the Radio Room, on the foremast, below the gig davits and in the vicinity of gun three. The explosion blew the forecastle and a section of the superstructure desk completely off as far aft as the bridge. Fires broke out throughout the forward section and the forward 20mm magazine exploded. The bulkhead of the forward fireroom was buckled, as was the main deck amidships. All engines were ordered to stop immediately and the commanding officer gave the order to abandon ship, which was sinking fast by the head. Only two life rafts were left in a condition to be freed. Depth charges were double checked and reported set on safe.

At 00:42 the ship disappeared stern last. The bow, detached, remained afloat.

At 00:43, an unknown number of WALKE's depth charges exploded, killing and seriously injuring many of the men in the water. The crew was organized in the water and seriously injured being placed on the rafts.

At approximately 02:00 an enemy submarine surfaced close to the rafts and illuminated all survivors for several minutes, but proceeded without incident. An enemy destroyer later illuminated survivors on the detached bow. There was much shouting from this vessel, but she also proceeded without taking action. Survivors were sighted and signaled at dawn by friendly aircraft. The USS MEADE was observed throughout the morning of 15 November firing on beached enemy transports. USS MEADE commenced picking up survivors with the aid of boats and cruiser aircraft at 14:00. 151 survivors were landed on Tulagi, where six died of wounds received in action. Total killed or missing in action were six officers and seventy-six enlisted.

4. During the action, the USS WALKE expended approximately 300 5inch anti-aircraft common projectiles. Gun three stood by throughout the action for illumination by star shells.

5. The courage and coolness of the entire crew was excellent throughout the action and the difficult period in the water. Morale and cooperation was so high on the part of all the officers and men that is it impossible to cite any individual above the group for exceptional heroism. //signed WJ Collum Jr., Lt. USN//

Japanese shells straddled Walke twice, and then a "Long Lance" torpedo slammed into her starboard side at a point almost directly below mount 52. Almost simultaneously, a salvo of shells from Nagara, Ayanami, and Uranami hurtled down upon the hapless destroyer, a deluge of steel that struck home with devastating effect in the radio room, the foremast, below the gig davits, and in the vicinity of mount 53, on the after deckhouse. Meanwhile, the torpedo had blown off the bow of the ship; and fire broke out as the forward 20-millimeter magazine blew up.

With the situation hopeless, Commander Thomas E. Fraser, Walke's commanding officer, ordered the ship abandoned. As the destroyer sank rapidly by the bow, only two life rafts could be launched. The others had been damaged irreparably. After the crew made sure that the depth charges were set on safe, they went over the side just before the ship slipped swiftly under the surface.

As Washington, dueling with Kirishima and smaller ships, swept through the flotsam and jetsam of battle, she briefly noted Walke's plight and that of Preston, which had also gone down under in a deluge of shells. At 0041, just a minute or so before Walke sank, life rafts from the battleship splashed into the sea for the benefit of the survivors. Although the destroyer's depth charges had apparently been set to "safe", some depth charges went off, killing a number of swimming survivors and seriously injuring others. As the battle went on ahead of them, the able-bodied survivors placed their more seriously wounded comrades on rafts.

Walke's survivors were, at one point, in two groups; some clinging to the still-floating bow section and others clustered around the two rafts that ship had been able to launch. During the harrowing night, they were twice illuminated by enemy warships but not molested, before the enemy switched off his searchlights and moved on.

At dawn, however, Walke's survivors, and those from Preston, witnessed the end of a quartet of Japanese transports beached during the night. Bombed and strafed by Army, Marine, and Navy planes, including aircraft from Enterprise, the four Japanese ships received the coup de grâce from the Meade that morning, just before the destroyer altered course and picked up the destroyermen from Walke and Preston.

Meade rescued 151 men from Walke, six of whom later died after they were brought ashore at Tulagi. Six officers, including Commander Fraser, and 76 men had died in the ship's fiery end off Savo Island. She was stricken from the Naval Vessel Register on 13 January 1943.

== 2025 Ocean Exploration Trusts Expedition ==
Located in the Solomon Islands, Iron Bottom Sound was the site of five major naval battles during the early years of the Pacific campaign during World War II. Over 100 naval vessels were lost during battles here, but only 30 have been located, and at least 21 remain to be found in the deep waters of Iron Bottom Sound.

On July 10, 2025, at a depth of over 900 meters E/V Nautilus definitively rediscovered Walke. Massive damage of the entire bow section, forward of the forwardmost torpedo launcher was confirmed. The EV Nautilus offered the first exploration of the Walke on July 18, 2025.

== Awards ==
Walke received three battle stars for her World War II service.
