= Harrellsville, North Carolina =

- Town
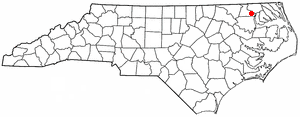
- Location of Harrellsville, North Carolina
- Coordinates: 36°18′06″N 76°47′30″W
- Country: United States
- State: North Carolina
- County: Hertford

Area
  - Total: 0.29 sq mi (0.75 km^{2})
  - Land: 0.29 sq mi (0.75 km^{2})
  - Water: 0 sq mi (0.00 km^{2})
- Elevation: 66 ft (20 m)

Population (2020)
  - Total: 85
  - Density: 293/sq mi (113.1/km^{2})
- Time zone: UTC-5 (Eastern (EST))
  - Summer (DST): UTC-4 (EDT)
- ZIP code: 27942
- Area code: 252
- FIPS code: 37-29720
- GNIS feature ID: 2406648

Harrellsville is a town in Hertford County, North Carolina, United States. As of the 2020 census, Harrellsville had a population of 85.

== Geography ==
Harrellsville is located in southeastern Hertford County. North Carolina Highway 45 runs through the town, leading northwest 11 miles (18 km) to Winton, the county seat, and south 7 miles (11 km) to Colerain.

According to the United States Census Bureau, Harrellsville has a total area of 0.29 square miles (0.75 km^{2}), all land.

== Demographics ==
Historical population
Census	Pop.	Note	%±
1890	110		—
1900	109		−0.9%
1910	140		28.4%
1920	131		−6.4%
1930	159		21.4%
1940	154		−3.1%
1950	167		8.4%
1960	171		2.4%
1970	165		−3.5%
1980	151		−8.5%
1990	106		−29.8%
2000	102		−3.8%
2010	106		3.9%
2020	85		−19.8%
U.S. Decennial Census

=== Racial and ethnic composition ===
Harrellsville town, North Carolina – Racial and ethnic composition Note: the US Census treats Hispanic/Latino as an ethnic category. This table excludes Latinos from the racial categories and assigns them to a separate category. Hispanics/Latinos may be of any race.
Race / Ethnicity (NH = Non-Hispanic)	Pop 2000	Pop 2010	Pop 2020	% 2000	% 2010	% 2020
White alone (NH)	77	81	61	75.49%	76.42%	71.76%
Black or African American alone (NH)	25	25	16	24.51%	23.58%	18.82%
Native American or Alaska Native alone (NH)	0	0	1	0.00%	0.00%	1.18%
Asian alone (NH)	0	0	0	0.00%	0.00%	0.00%
Native Hawaiian or Pacific Islander alone (NH)	0	0	0	0.00%	0.00%	0.00%
Other race alone (NH)	0	0	0	0.00%	0.00%	0.00%
Mixed race or Multiracial (NH)	0	0	4	0.00%	0.00%	4.71%
Hispanic or Latino (any race)	0	0	3	0.00%	0.00%	3.53%
Total	102	106	85	100.00%	100.00%	100.00%

=== 2000 census ===
As of the census of 2000, there were 102 people, 47 households, and 36 families residing in the town. The population density was 307.3 inhabitants per square mile (118.6/km^{2}). There were 50 housing units at an average density of 150.6 per square mile (58.1/km^{2}). The racial makeup of the town was 71.49% White, 21.51% African American, 0.00% Native American, 0.00% Asian, 0.00% Pacific Islander, 0.00% from other races, and 0.00% from two or more races. 0.00% of the population are Hispanic or Latino of any race.

There were 47 households, out of which 29.8% had children under the age of 18 living with them, 59.6% were married couples living together, 12.8% had a female householder with no husband present, and 21.3% were non-families. 21.3% of all households were made up of individuals, and 14.9% had someone living alone who was 65 years of age or older. The average household size was 2.17 and the average family size was 2.49.

In the town, the population was spread out, with 19.6% under the age of 18, 28.4% from 25 to 44, 28.4% from 45 to 64, and 23.5% who were 65 years of age or older. The median age was 49 years. For every 100 females, there were 100.0 males. For every 100 females age 18 and over, there were 90.7 males.

The median income for a household in the town was $32,000, and the median income for a family was $31,500. Males had a median income of $30,833 versus $30,000 for females. The per capita income for the town was $17,051. None of the population and none of the families were below the poverty line.

== History ==
The town of Harrellsville was founded in the 1820s by the Harrell families. A post office was established in 1827, and Abner Harrell became the postmaster in 1833. Originally known as Bethel, the town was changed to Harrellsville in the 1860s out of respect for Abner Harrell. Originally, Abner Harrell's house, one of the largest buildings in the town, remained standing until circa 2000, when the land it stood on was purchased and the house torn down.

The Harrellsville Historic District was listed on the National Register of Historic Places in 1995.

== Notable person ==
- Robert Holmes Smith (1898–1943) Commander, Squadron 2, U.S. Navy Pacific Submarine Fleet in World War II
