= USS Robert H. Smith =

Robert H. Smith-class destroyer minelayer

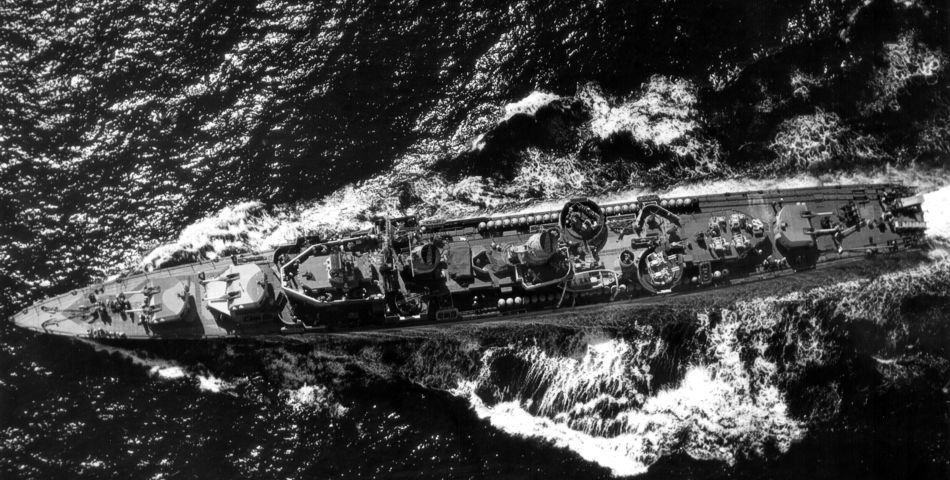
- USS Robert H. Smith (DM-23) underway c. 1944

History

United States
- Name: Robert H. Smith
- Namesake: Robert H. Smith
- Builder: Bath Iron Works
- Laid down: 10 January 1944
- Launched: 25 May 1944
- Commissioned: 4 August 1944
- Identification: DD-735
- Reclassified: DM-23, 19 July 1944
- Decommissioned: 29 January 1947
- Stricken: 26 February 1971

General characteristics
- Class & type: Robert H. Smith-class destroyer
- Displacement: 2,200 tons
- Length: 376 ft 6 in (114.76 m)
- Beam: 40 ft 10 in (12.45 m)
- Draft: 18 ft 10 in (5.74 m)
- Speed: 34 knots (63 km/h; 39 mph)
- Complement: 363 officers and enlisted
- Armament: 6 x 5 in (127 mm)/38 cal. guns; 12 x 40 mm guns; 8 x 20 mm cannons; 2 x depth charge tracks; 4 depth charge projectors

USS Robert H. Smith (DD-735/DM-23) was the lead ship of her class of destroyer minelayers in the United States Navy.

== Namesake ==
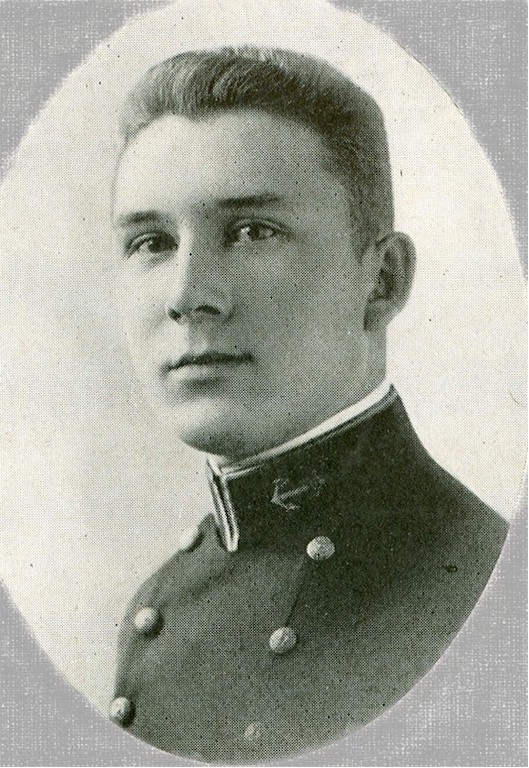
Robert Holmes Smith, c. 1920

Robert Holmes Smith was born on 8 August 1898 in Harrellsville, North Carolina. He graduated from the United States Naval Academy on 6 June 1919. After duty on various surface ships, he served with the Submarine Service for 17 years. He commanded USS Bonita, was an instructor at the New London submarine school, a member of the Naval Academy staff, Submarine Gunnery Officer with the Bureau of Navigation, Navigation Officer in USS Pennsylvania and Chief of Staff for Submarine Division, Atlantic Patrol Force. Following promotion to Captain, he commanded USS Sperry in the Pacific from May 1942 to January 1943. He was Commander of Squadron 2, Pacific Submarine Fleet, when he died in the crash of the Philippine Clipper flying boat in Northern California on 21 January 1943.

== Construction and career ==
Robert H. Smith was laid down on 10 January 1944 by Bath Iron Works, Bath, Maine and launched on 25 May 1944; sponsored by Mrs. Robert Holmes Smith. The vessel was redesignated DM-23 on 19 July 1944; and commissioned on 4 August 1944.

Following shakedown off Bermuda, the new destroyer minelayer transited the Panama Canal with a Pacific-bound convoy 28 November, arriving at San Pedro 9 December and Pearl Harbor 21 December.

=== Iwo Jima ===
On 27 January 1945, Robert H. Smith sailed as escort for a convoy of the 5th Amphibious Corps bound for Iwo Jima. During final amphibious rehearsals off Saipan, she rescued the crew of a downed B-29. She arrived off Iwo Jima early in the morning of D-day, 19 February 1945. For most of the next three weeks, she served on radar picket station 50 miles (80 km) north of the island, controlling CAP and reporting radar contacts. She also bombarded Japanese shore positions and acted as a screening ship for the night retirement formations.

=== Ulithi ===
Robert H. Smith departed Iwo Jima on 9 March and escorted a group of merchantmen as far as Saipan; and then sailed for Ulithi, arriving there 13 March. On 25 March she arrived off Kerama Retto with a group of minesweepers. During the pre-assault period, when she was twice attacked by kamikazes, Robert H. Smith acted as support ship for minesweepers, as radar picket ship, and as screening ship in night retirement formations. During the landings she screened the transport area; then departed 5 April with a convoy for Guam. On her return 21 April, she undertook six weeks of radar picket duty, undergoing numerous air attacks and downing five planes. On 4 June Robert H. Smith completed her radar picket duty. She spent a few more days screening the Okinawa transport area and supporting the amphibious attack on Iheya Point.

=== East China Sea ===
On 13 June Robert H. Smith began a long series of operations supporting minesweeping groups clearing an East China Sea area near Miyako Jima in the southern Ryukyu Islands. Air support was provided by a group of escort carriers with Robert H. Smith acting as primary fighter director ship. The operation lasted until 25 June. The next area to be swept was in the central part of the East China Sea about 100 miles (160 km) east of Shanghai. In that operation the ship acted as radar buoy layer and small craft supply ship, in addition to her fighter director activities.

=== Okinawa ===
In July, Robert H. Smith departed Okinawa for a large minefield in the northern part of the East China Sea about 100 miles (160 km) southwest of Kyūshū. However, scarcely a third of the area had been swept when the Japanese offer of surrender was accepted.

=== Yellow Sea ===
Robert H. Smith and other ships were suddenly recalled and sent to the Yellow Sea to sweep a channel to the occupation ports of Korea for the 7th Amphibious Corps. It later became the task of Robert H. Smith to lead the transport convoy through that channel on 7 September 1945. The group then proceeded to Sasebo to clear mines from the sea approaches to the ex-Japanese naval base for transports carrying occupation troops for Kyushu, Japan. After working in the Sasebo area for a few weeks, during which the ship was forced to ride out several typhoons, she joined a group of larger minesweepers in an operation in the Van Diemen Strait just south of Kyushu. She then operated with a minesweeping force in the Yellow Sea, and made a courier run from Sasebo to Kiirun to support minesweepers working in the straits of Formosa, returning to Sasebo by way of Shanghai.

=== End of World War II and fate ===
On 17 January 1946 Robert H. Smith sailed for the United States, reaching San Francisco on 7 February 1946. On 29 January 1947, she was placed out of commission in reserve and attached to the San Diego Group, Pacific Reserve Fleet.

She remained a part of the Pacific Reserve Fleet until 1971, when after being surveyed, she was found to be unfit for further service. Robert H. Smith was stricken from the Navy list on 26 February 1971.

Robert H. Smith earned five battle stars for World War II service.

As of 2009, no other ship in the United States Navy has been named Robert H. Smith.
