= Harrellsville Historic District =

Historic district in North Carolina, United States

- U.S. National Register of Historic Places
- U.S. Historic district
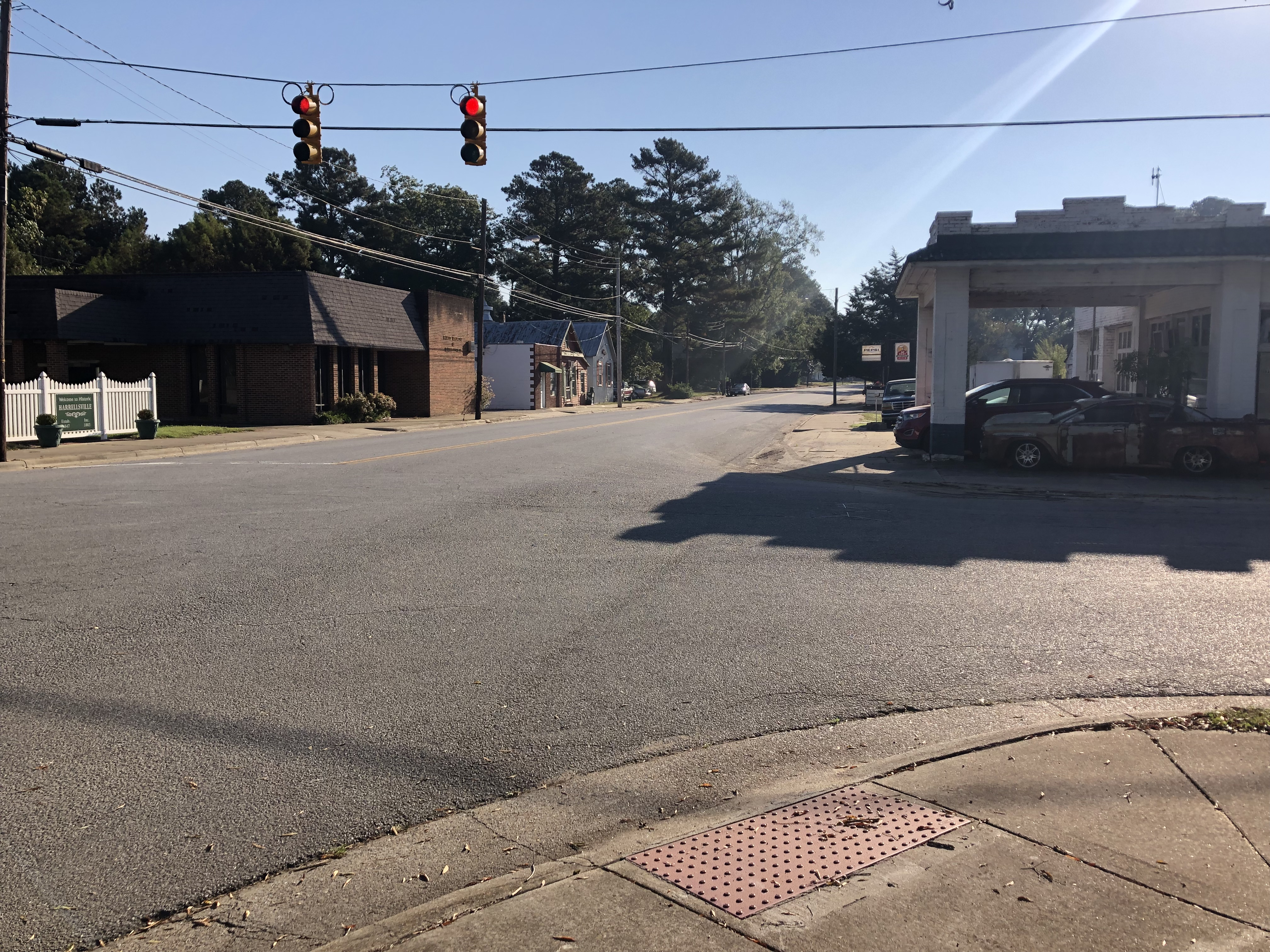
- Looking south at the intersection of Main St. and Quebec St.

- Location within North Carolina Location within the United States
- Location: Roughly, E. and W. Main St., Quebec St. and Tar Landing Rd., Harrellsville, North Carolina
- Coordinates: 36°18′05″N 76°47′31″W
- Area: 150 acres (61 ha)
- Built: 1827
- Architectural style: Greek Revival, Queen Anne, Bungalow/craftsman
- NRHP reference No.: 95001398
- Added to NRHP: November 29, 1995

Harrellsville Historic District is a national historic district located at Harrellsville, North Carolina. The district encompasses 69 contributing buildings, 12 contributing sites, and 4 contributing structures in the village of Harrellsville. The buildings include notable examples of Greek Revival, Queen Anne, and Bungalow / American Craftsman architecture built between about 1827 and 1945. Notable contributing resources include the Sharp Family Cemetery, Abner Harrell House (c. 1811), J.L. Smith House (1910-1915), Taylor Warehouse (1900), Work Projects Administration built School Gymnasium (1935) and Harrellsville School Auditorium (1940), John Bembury Sharp House (1833), and R.C. Mason & Son Store (1905).

It was listed on the National Register of Historic Places in 1995.
