= USS Anthony (DD-515) =

Fletcher-class destroyer

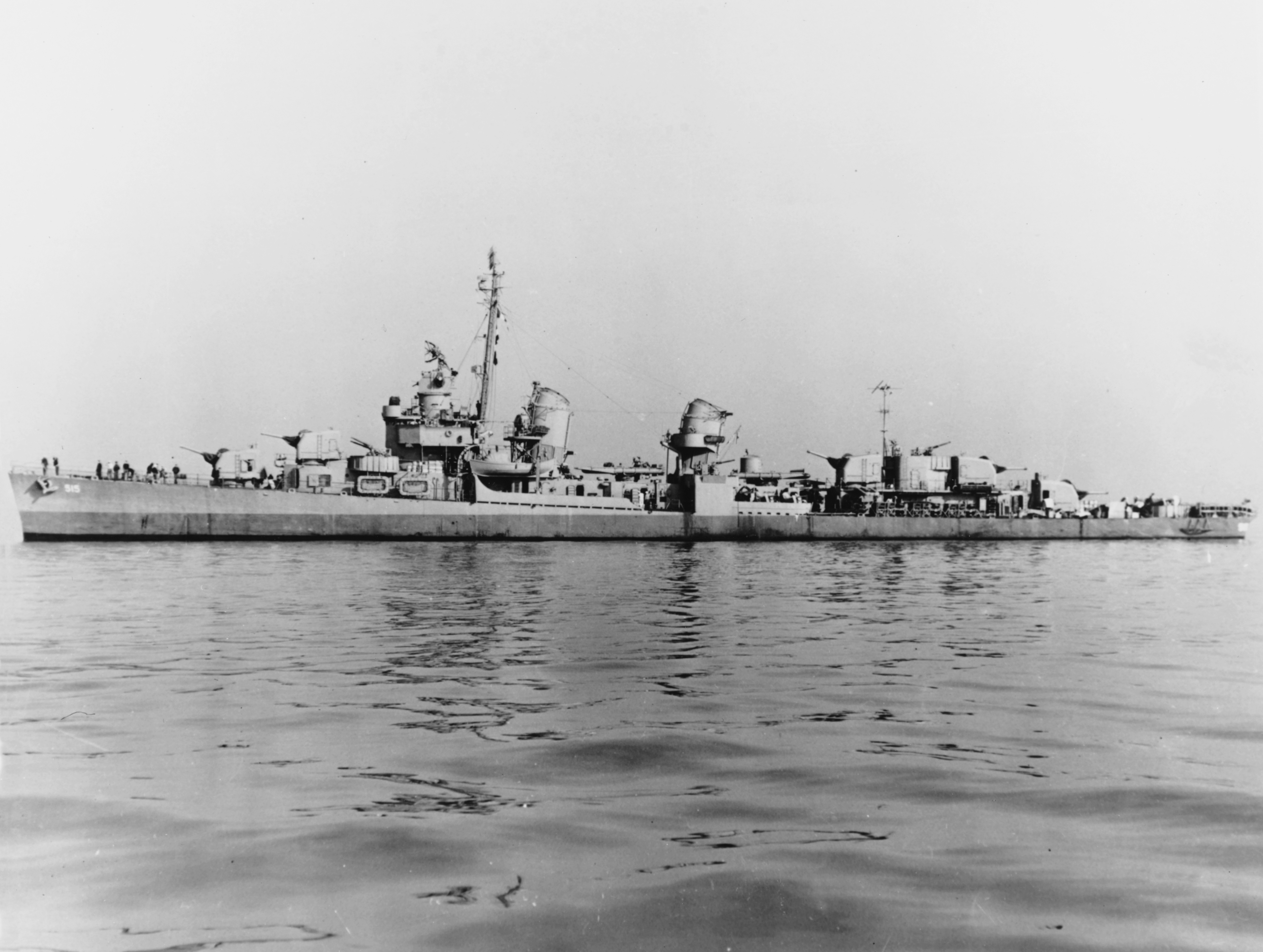
- USS Anthony (DD-515) off Mare Island Navy Yard, California, 8 December 1944

History

United States
- Name: Anthony
- Namesake: William Anthony
- Builder: Bath Iron Works
- Laid down: 17 August 1942
- Launched: 20 December 1942
- Commissioned: 26 February 1943
- Decommissioned: 17 April 1946
- Stricken: 15 April 1972
- Identification: DD-515
- Fate: Transferred to West Germany, 17 January 1958

West Germany
- Name: Zerstörer 1
- Acquired: 17 January 1958
- Stricken: 1976
- Identification: D170
- Fate: Sunk as a target, 16 May 1979

General characteristics
- Class & type: Fletcher-class destroyer; Zerstörer 1-class destroyer
- Displacement: 2,050 long tons (2,080 t)
- Length: 376 ft 6 in (114.76 m)
- Beam: 39 ft 8 in (12.09 m)
- Draft: 17 ft 9 in (5.41 m)
- Propulsion: 60,000 shp (45 MW) ; 2 propellers
- Speed: 35 knots (65 km/h; 40 mph)
- Range: 6,500 nmi (12,000 km; 7,500 mi) at 15 knots (28 km/h; 17 mph)
- Complement: 329
- Armament: As USS Anthony: 5 × single Mk 12 5 in (127 mm)/38 guns; 5 × twin 40 mm (1.6 in) Bofors AA guns; 7 × single 20 mm (0.8 in) Oerlikon AA guns; 2 × quintuple 21 in (533 mm) torpedo tubes; 6 × single depth charge throwers; 2 × depth charge racks; As Zerstörer 1: 4 × 5 in (127 mm)/38 cal. guns; 6 × 3 in (76 mm)/50 cal. AA guns; 5 × 21 in (533 mm) torpedo tubes; 2 x 21 in (533 mm) ASW torpedo tubes; 2 × Hedgehog launchers; 2 × depth charge tracks

USS Anthony (DD-515), a Fletcher-class destroyer, was the second ship of the United States Navy to be named for Marine Sergeant Major William Anthony (1853–1899).

== Construction ==
Anthony was laid down on 17 August 1942, at Bath, Maine, by the Bath Iron Works Corp.; launched on 20 December 1942; sponsored by Miss Alice Anthony and Miss Frances Anthony, granddaughters of Sergeant Major William Anthony; and commissioned at the Boston Navy Yard, on 26 February 1943.

== 1943 ==
The destroyer got underway on 26 March for a shakedown training out of Guantánamo Bay, Cuba, and arrived back in Boston on 27 April for a tender availability. She then headed for Norfolk, Virginia but departed Hampton Roads on 10 May, bound for the Pacific. After transiting the Panama Canal, Anthony joined the Pacific Fleet and arrived in Pearl Harbor on 31 May.

Two months of intensive training for the destroyer ensued. She left Hawaiian waters on 5 August in the screen of a convoy bound, via Pago Pago, Samoa, for Efate Island, New Hebrides. Anthony dropped anchor off Efate on 27 August.

Her next several weeks were devoted to more training exercises. Then, late in October, Anthony was among the destroyers escorting troop transports to the Solomon Islands for landings on Bougainville. She took part in a preinvasion bombardment and stood by while marines landed on the beaches of Empress Augusta Bay on 1 November. The destroyers pulled into Purvis Bay, Florida Island, on 3 November. However, she returned to Bougainville on 8 November to reinforce American naval forces off that island. Despite numerous air attacks, Anthony emerged unscathed from covering the transports during their successful unloading. She pulled into Tulagi on 15 November and soon began escorting ships carrying troops and supplies to various points in the Solomon Islands.

== 1944 ==
This routine was interrupted for the destroyer on 20 January 1944 by an order to proceed to Bougainville Strait. There, Anthony encountered several small Japanese ships and destroyed a gunboat and several barges before resuming her escort duties.

The ship got underway on 15 February to shepherd a group of LSTs to the landing sites on Green Island. Although Anthony was originally slated to perform gunfire support duties, the American troops encountered such light enemy opposition when they went ashore that she was not required to carry out that assignment.

After a brief respite at Purvis Bay, the destroyer sailed on 23 February to take part in a bombardment of the enemy stronghold at Rabaul, New Britain Island. Then, during March, she covered the invasion of Emirau Island before serving as an escort on several supply runs between Guadalcanal and Emirau.

On 24 April, Anthony was assigned to duty with a battleship task force. The destroyer screened New Mexico, Idaho, and Pennsylvania to Australia. The warships arrived at Sydney; and, on the 29th after a week of liberty in that city, Anthony weighed anchor on 6 May to return to Purvis Bay.

After brief training, Anthony and a group of ships sailed on 2 June for the invasion of the Marianas. They arrived in Kwajalein on 8 June to refuel, then turned westward toward the Marianas. On 14 June, the destroyer fired her guns on Saipan and, the next day, screened other ships during landings on Saipan. On 16 June, she bombarded Guam. The destroyer then detached to join Task Force 58 (TF 58), the Fast Carrier Task Force. Her duties then included screening the carriers and rescuing downed aviators.

On 8 July, Anthony began providing harassing fire on Guam, and the bombardment continued for several days. When relieved, the destroyer proceeded to Eniwetok to refuel and take on provisions. She returned to the action off Guam on 21 July and assumed antisubmarine patrol duty.

On 10 August, Anthony was ordered to proceed to Hawaii. She made an intermediate stop at Eniwetok before arriving at Pearl Harbor on the 20th. There, the ship was briefly dry-docked for repairs and then took part in training exercises off Maui. Anthony sailed for Ulithi on 15 September and arrived safely in that lagoon on 3 October. Shortly thereafter, the destroyer got underway to return to the west coast of the United States.

Soon after her reaching San Francisco, Calif. on 25 October, Anthony entered the Mare Island Navy Yard for an overhaul. She left the shipyard on 13 December to travel to San Diego for a week of refresher training. The destroyer departed the west coast on 20 December with a convoy bound for Hawaii and reached Pearl Harbor on 30 December.

== 1945 ==
There, she began preparations for the upcoming operations at Iwo Jima. Anthony and other ships of the invasion force got underway on 27 January 1945 and stopped en route at Eniwetok and Guam. The destroyer was assigned to the screen of transports carrying reserve forces. She conducted shore bombardment and night harassing fire off Iwo Jima until 6 March, when she got underway for the Philippines.

Anthony anchored in San Pedro Bay on 13 March. The ship began preparing for the assault on Okinawa. She left Philippine waters on 27 March and arrived on station off Okinawa on 1 April. But for one trip to Ulithi, the destroyer remained in the dangerous waters of that embattled island carrying out fire support, screening, and radar picket duties until late June. She underwent several Japanese air attacks during this time and claimed to have downed five enemy planes. On 27 May, kamikazes attacked Anthony and her sister ship Braine. When two succeeded in crashing into Braine, Anthony took all survivors on board and towed the damaged vessel to Kerama Retto.

Anthony had another close call on 7 June. While on radar picket station, she was again attacked by enemy aircraft. A kamikaze splashed along the destroyer's port side, leaving a large hole in her hull and carrying away lifelines and stanchions for 25 feet (7.6 m) on that side. Five crewmen either jumped or were blown into the water, but all were recovered safely. The ship remained on duty until 24 June, then returned to Leyte, Philippines, for an availability.

On 13 July, Anthony got underway for an anti-shipping sweep off the China coast between Fuzhou and Wenzhou. After touching back at Okinawa for refueling and replenishing, Anthony commenced another sweep on 26 July off the mouth of the Yangtze River. The destroyer returned to Okinawa on 1 August and operated from that base through the end of hostilities a fortnight later.

Anthony sailed on 7 September for duty supporting the occupation of Japan. She carried out minesweeping operations off Nagasaki and Sasebo and then anchored at Sasebo on 29 September. Anthony began the voyage home on 17 November and, after stops at Midway and Pearl Harbor, finally arrived in San Diego. Shortly thereafter, she got underway for the east coast and transited the Panama Canal en route to Charleston, South Carolina.

Preservation work began shortly after her arrival in Charleston to ready the ship for inactivation. Anthony was placed out of commission, in reserve, on 17 April 1946.

Anthony earned seven battle stars for her World War II service, and was awarded a Navy Unit Commendation for heroism during the Okinawa campaign.

== Zerstörer 1 (D170), 1958–1972 ==
On 17 January 1958, the destroyer was loaned to the Federal Republic of Germany, and renamed Zerstörer 1. She was returned to United States custody and simultaneously struck from the Navy list on 15 April 1972. The ship was then sold to West Germany on 27 June 1972 for cannibalization and scrapping. The ship was stricken in 1976. She was sunk by U-29 as a torpedo target in the Mediterranean on 16 May 1979.
