= USS Tolman =

Robert H. Smith-class destroyer minelayer

- USS Tolman (DM-28) October, 1944

History

United States
- Name: Tolman
- Namesake: Charles E. Tolman
- Builder: Bath Iron Works
- Laid down: 10 April 1944
- Launched: 13 August 1944
- Commissioned: 27 October 1944
- Decommissioned: 29 January 1947
- Stricken: 1 December 1970
- Fate: Sunk as a target 25 January 1997

General characteristics
- Class & type: Robert H. Smith-class destroyer
- Displacement: 2,200 tons
- Length: 376 ft 6 in (114.76 m)
- Beam: 40 ft 10 in (12.45 m)
- Draft: 18 ft 10 in (5.74 m)
- Speed: 34 knots (63 km/h; 39 mph)
- Complement: 363 officers and enlisted
- Armament: 6 x 5 in (130 mm) guns; 12 x 40 mm guns; 8 x 20 mm guns; 2 depth charge tracks; 4 depth charge projectors

USS Tolman (DD-740/DM-28/MMD-28) was a Robert H. Smith-class destroyer minelayer in the United States Navy.

== Namesake ==
Charles E. Tolman was born on 25 June 1903 in Concord, Massachusetts. He entered the United States Naval Academy in the summer of 1921 and graduated on 4 June 1925. After serving on the battleship USS Utah, he was transferred to USS Worden in 1926. Tolman then completed training courses at the Naval Torpedo Station, Newport, Rhode Island, and at the Submarine Base, New London, Connecticut. He served on submarines USS O-4 in 1928 and USS S-22 from 1929 to 1932 when he returned to the Naval Academy for two years. He then served on the submarine USS S-46 in 1934 and commanded USS S-30 from April 1935 to May 1937. He was attached to the Office of the Chief of Naval Operations for 17 months before assuming command of USS Spearfish (SS-190) on 7 October 1939. In January 1941, Tolman joined the staff of Commander, Submarines, Atlantic Fleet.

Commander Tolman became the commanding officer of USS De Haven upon its commissioning on 21 September 1942. The destroyer steamed to the South Pacific in November 1942 and supported operations in the Solomon Islands. On the afternoon of 1 February 1943, while escorting landing craft, De Haven was attacked by six Japanese dive bombers. Fighting off the attackers, the destroyer downed three enemy planes before a bomb struck its navigating bridge, stopped her and killed Tolman. Two more hits and a near miss doomed De Haven, which sank within two minutes. He was posthumously awarded the Navy Cross.

== Construction and career ==
Tolman was laid down as DD-740 on 10 April 1944 at Bath, Maine, by the Bath Iron Works; reclassified a destroyer minelayer and redesignated DM-28 on 19 July; launched on 13 August 1944; sponsored by Mrs. Helen Tolman; and commissioned on 27 October 1944.

The minelayer held her shakedown training off Bermuda during November and December and returned, via Norfolk, Virginia, to Boston, Massachusetts. On 13 January 1945, Tolman departed Boston to escort the cruiser Pittsburgh to the west coast. She called at San Diego on 27 January and then escorted the cruiser Birmingham to Hawaii. She participated in exercises at Pearl Harbor until 23 February before heading for Eniwetok and Ulithi. On 19 March, Tolman sortied from Ulithi with Task Group 52.4 to provide fire support and antisubmarine screening for the minesweepers clearing channels prior to the amphibious assault on the Ryukyu Islands. On 22 March, she began clearing the approaches to the beaches of Okinawa.

=== Okinawa campaign ===
Shortly after midnight on 28 March, she encountered eight Japanese motor torpedo boats. They closed to 4,000 yards (3,700 m) when Tolman opened fire with her 5-inch (127 mm) and 40-millimeter batteries. Tolman increased her speed to 34 knots (63 km/h; 39 mph) and maneuvered radically to avoid torpedoes. Two of the enemy boats exploded and sank as the remainder laid a smoke screen. The minelayer briefly lost contact, but used radar-controlled fire against the remaining boats and fired star shells to ferret them out. The last boat was seen to slow, apparently in trouble, just before it was blown up. The ship evidently made a clean sweep of the torpedo boats as a search revealed nothing, and no boats had been seen leaving the area.

Later that morning, Tolman was approximately 500 yards (460 m) from the minesweeper Skylark when Skylark struck and detonated a mine against her hull. As Tolman moved in to pass a tow line to the stricken ship, Skylark hit a second mine and began settling rapidly. Tolman backed full to clear the mined area, but her boats, together with PC-1228 and PC-1179, rescued 105 survivors.

On 29 March, during several air attacks, Tolman reported downing one plane of three in the first raid; one of two in the second attack; and, with the aid of the destroyer Barton and the minesweeper Wiley, two of three in the third. Later, she shot down a kamikaze that was approaching her in a dive. The minelayer then proceeded to Kerama Retto to transfer Skylark's survivors to other ships.

On the morning of 30 March, Tolman contacted three Japanese torpedo boats at a range of 3,000 yards (2,700 m). She went ahead at flank speed and made a hard turn to port. One torpedo passed astern and another was reported off her starboard bow. A third exploded astern, causing considerable vibration. On 3 April, she screened Transport Division 17 to a waiting area approximately 150 miles (240 km) southeast of Okinawa and remained there for 10 days before returning to the Hagushi beaches.

Tolman grounded off Nagunna Reef on the morning of 19 April and remained aground. Two tugs then pulled her free on 25 April, and the salvage ship Clamp towed her to Kerama Retto for repairs. She entered drydock on 15 May and was not ready for sea until late in June. On 28 June, the ship got underway for the United States. After arriving at San Pedro on 21 July, she began permanent repairs that were completed on 8 November.

=== Postwar and fate ===
The minelayer stood out for the Far East early in December and arrived at Sasebo on the day after Christmas. She operated out of Sasebo until February 1946 and then shifted her base of operations to Pusan, Korea, for three months. The ship began the return voyage to California on 4 May and arrived at San Francisco on 27 May 1946. Proceeding down the coast to San Diego in January 1947, she was decommissioned on 29 January 1947. Tolman was reclassified a fast minelayer, MMD-28, in January 1969. She was struck from the Navy list on 1 December 1970.

After being struck from the Navy List, Tolman was utilized as a target ship up and down the California coast for many years. Since Tolman was decommissioned in 1947, and not used again, by the 1980s, Tolman was a treasure trove of wartime parts. At that time, the caretakers of the destroyer Kidd removed several tons of hard to find parts, to help restore Kidd to her wartime appearance. After 25 years of being used for target practice and spare parts, Tolman was sunk as a target on 25 January 1997.

== Awards and honors ==
Tolman received one battle star for World War II service.
