= Samuel Adams (naval officer) =

US Navy officer (1912–1942)

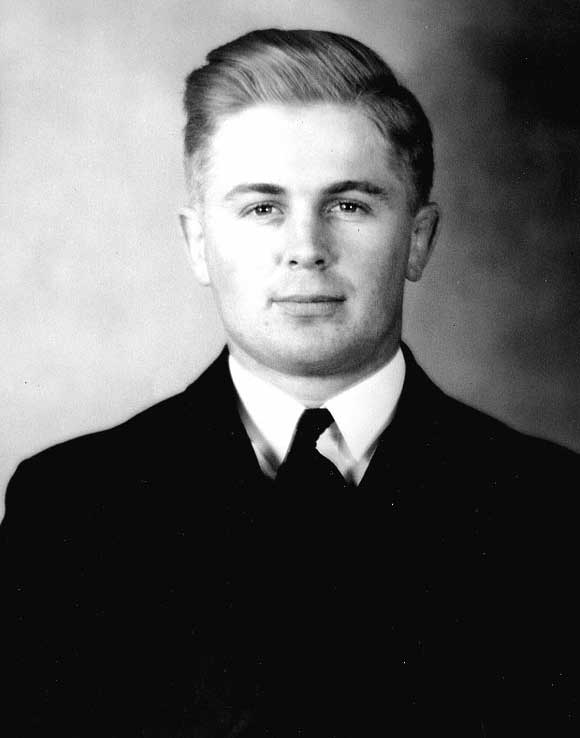
- Born: April 10, 1912; Northampton, Massachusetts
- Died: June 5, 1942 (aged 30); Killed in action in the Pacific theatre
- Military career
- Allegiance: United States of America
- Branch: United States Navy
- Service years: 1935–1942
- Rank: Lieutenant
- Conflicts: World War II: Battle of Coral Sea; Battle of Midway
- Awards: Navy Cross (3)

Samuel Adams (April 10, 1912 – June 5, 1942) was an officer in the United States Navy decorated for action in the Battle of Midway during World War II.

== Biography ==
Born in Northampton, Massachusetts, Adams was appointed to the United States Naval Academy from the state's second Congressional district in 1931, and graduated in 1935 with an appointment to the rank of ensign. One of his classmates was Eugene B. Fluckey. Adams was assigned to sea duty on battleships, serving aboard USS West Virginia in June and July 1935 before being reassigned to USS Tennessee until January 2, 1938. He was then accepted to flight school at NAS Pensacola, where he earned wings as a naval aviator on January 17, 1939.

Soon promoted to lieutenant (j.g.), Adams was assigned to aircraft carrier duty, first aboard USS Saratoga (CV-3) for one month (April–May 1939) and then with Bombing Squadron (VB) 5 aboard USS Yorktown (CV-5), from May 13, 1939 to the end of his career. While with Yorktown, Adams flew Northrop BT-1s, later transitioning with the rest of the squadron to the SBD Dauntless aircraft, flying escort for North Atlantic convoys until the U.S. entered the war. He was promoted to lieutenant on October 1, 1941.

After the attack on Pearl Harbor, Yorktown was sent to the Pacific theater. Adams took part in raids in the Gilbert and Marshall Islands. He led raids on land and sea targets in and around Jaluit on February 1, 1942, against shipping off New Guinea on March 10, and on the island of Tulagi on May 4. He participated in the Battle of the Coral Sea on May 7 and 8. During this period Adams was twice awarded the Navy Cross.

The six Japanese aircraft carriers that had played a crucial role in the attack on Pearl Harbor became a primary focus of U.S. naval efforts in the ensuing Pacific campaign. Four of these ships were part of a battle group involved in the Battle of Midway; three were set ablaze in that battle on June 4, 1942. The fourth, the Hiryū, remained unscathed. At about 2:40 P.M. local time on June 5, Adams and his wingman, Lt. Harlan Dickson, spotted her and her battle group, consisting of two battleships, three heavy cruisers and four destroyers. Under fire from a Zero fighter, Adams radioed the ships' location (31°15' N., 179°05' W., moving north at approximately 20 knots). Because of this, the U.S. battle group was able to put the Hiryū out of action, and inflict major damage on the rest of the battle group.

On June 5, Adams spotted the Japanese destroyer Tanikaze and attacked; his plane disappeared in the clouds and was never seen again, presumed downed by anti-aircraft fire from the destroyer. Also killed in the attack was Adams's radioman Joseph Karrol.

Adams was posthumously awarded a third Navy Cross for the mission in which he located the Hiryū.

== Namesake ==
The U.S. Navy destroyer USS Adams (DM-27), which saw duty in the latter part of World War II, was named in his honor and christened by his widow, Mrs. Maude Ryan Adams.

== Award Citations ==
=== Navy Cross (first award) ===

The President of the United States of America takes pride in presenting the Navy Cross (Posthumously) to Lieutenant Samuel Adams (NSN: 0-74937), United States Navy, for extraordinary heroism in operations against the enemy while serving as Pilot of a carrier-based Navy Dive Bomber in Bombing Squadron FIVE (VB-5), attached to the U.S.S. YORKTOWN (CV-5), in action against enemy Japanese forces at Salamaua and Lae, New Guinea, on 10 March 1942. Leading his division in a dive-bombing attack against a formation of Japanese cruisers and destroyers, Lieutenant Adams, in the face of heavy anti-aircraft fire, personally made one of several direct heavy bomb hits on a light cruiser, causing serious damage and probable destruction of the hostile vessel. His superb leadership and outstanding courage were in keeping with the highest traditions of the United States Naval Service.

=== Navy Cross (second award) ===

The President of the United States of America takes pleasure in presenting a Gold Star in lieu of a Second Award of the Navy Cross to Lieutenant Samuel Adams (NSN: 0-74937), United States Navy, for extraordinary heroism in operations against the enemy while serving as Pilot of a carrier-based Navy Dive Bomber in Bombing Squadron FIVE (VB-5), attached to the U.S.S. YORKTOWN (CV-5), in dive bombing attacks against enemy Japanese forces at Tulagi Harbor on 4 May 1942, and in an attack on an enemy aircraft carrier in the Battle of the Coral Sea on 7 and 8 May 1942. Pressing home these attacks in the face of tremendous anti-aircraft fire and, on 8 May, also harassed by heavy aircraft opposition, Lieutenant Adams assisted greatly in the sinking or damaging of the carrier and eight other enemy vessels. His conscientious devotion to duty and gallant self-command against formidable odds contributed materially to the success of our forces in the Battle of the Coral Sea.

=== Navy Cross (third award) ===

The President of the United States of America takes pleasure in presenting a Second Gold Star in lieu of a Third Award of the Navy Cross to Lieutenant Samuel Adams (NSN: 0-74937), United States Navy, for extraordinary heroism in operations against the enemy while serving as Pilot of a carrier-based Navy Scouting Plane in Scouting Squadron FIVE (VS-5), attached to the U.S.S. YORKTOWN (CV-5), in action against enemy Japanese during the Air Battle of Midway, 4–6 June 1942. Locating major enemy units, Lieutenant Adams, in a persistent and vigorous effort to maintain contact, pressed home repeated attacks against harassing enemy aircraft until he finally succeeded in driving them off. Throughout the duration of his bold assaults, despite the distraction of concentrated anti-aircraft fire and power fighter opposition, he, with superb presence of mind and keen appreciation of the value of uninterrupted information, kept sending out complete contact and amplifying reports, which later enabled our forces to attack the last remaining Japanese aircraft carrier. His gallant perseverance and conscientious devotion to duty contributed in large measure to the defeat of the enemy and were in keeping with the highest traditions of the United States Naval Service.

=== Air Medal ===
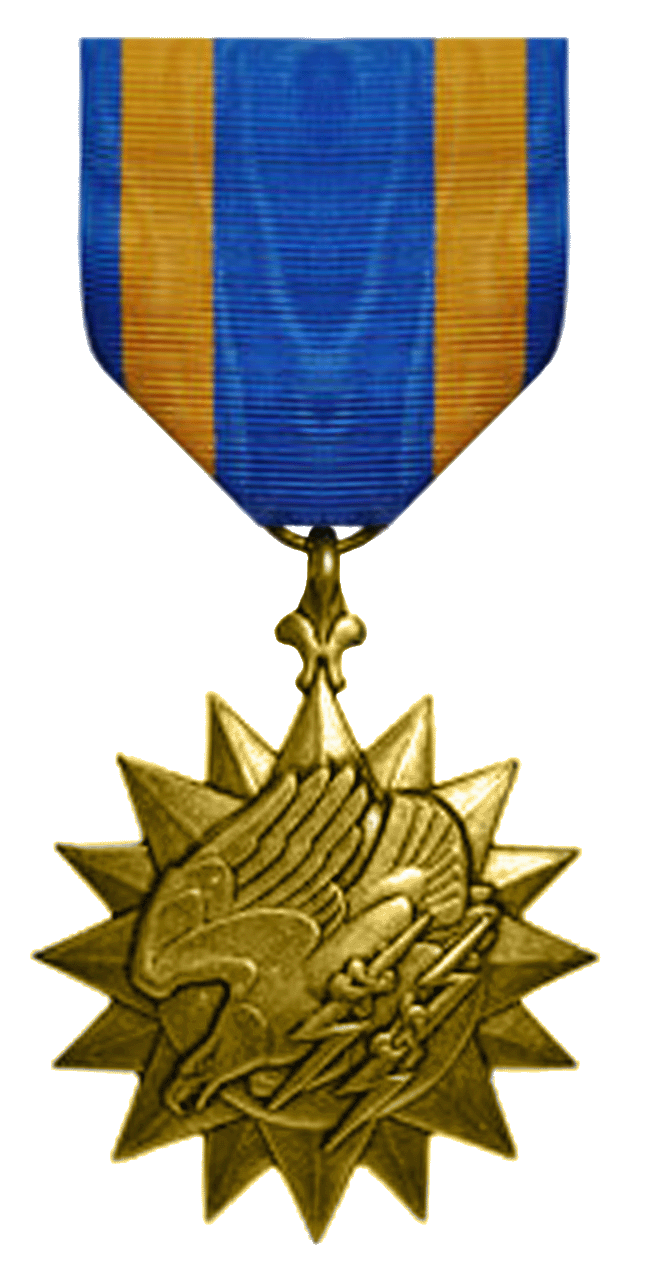

The President of the United States of America takes pride in presenting the Air Medal (Posthumously) to Lieutenant Samuel Adams (NSN: 0-74937), United States Navy, for meritorious achievement in aerial flight as a Section Leader in Bombing Squadron FIVE (VB-5), attached to the U.S.S. YORKTOWN (CV-5), in action against enemy Japanese forces on Jaluit Atoll, Marshall Islands, 1 February 1942. Participating in the first raid of the war by Naval forces against Japanese-controlled territory, Lieutenant Adams led his section through darkness and extremely hazardous weather conditions over an area on which little advance information had been obtained and, reaching the target, executed a dive-bombing and strafing attack in the face of heavy anti-aircraft fire to inflict severe damages on shore installations and enemy vessels in the harbor. By his courage, skilled airmanship and devotion to duty, Lieutenant Adams upheld the highest traditions of the United States Naval Service.

== See also ==
- List of people who disappeared mysteriously at sea
