= USS Henry A. Wiley =

Robert H. Smith-class destroyer minelayer

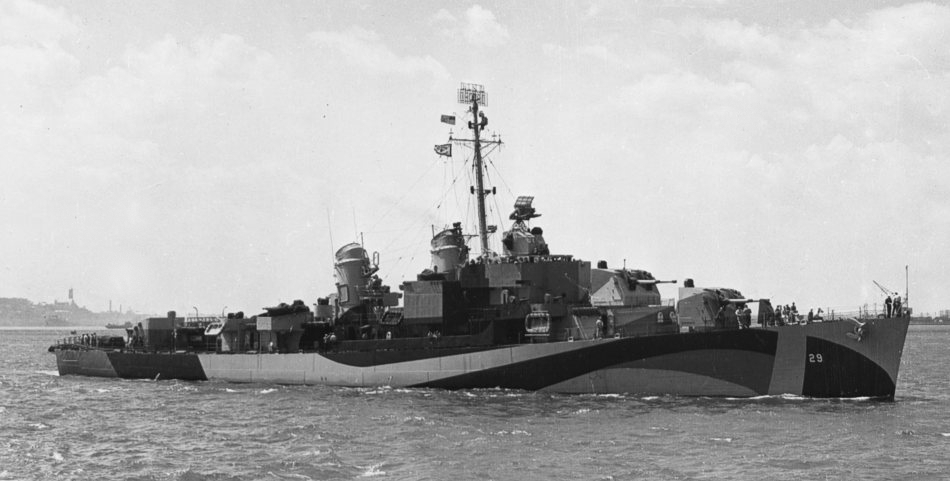
- InsertAltTextHere

History

United States
- Name: Henry A. Wiley
- Namesake: Henry A. Wiley
- Builder: Bethlehem Mariners Harbor, Staten Island, New York
- Launched: 21 April 1944
- Commissioned: 31 August 1944
- Decommissioned: 29 January 1947
- Stricken: 15 October 1970
- Fate: Sold for scrapping, 30 May 1972

General characteristics
- Class & type: Robert H. Smith-class destroyer
- Displacement: 2,200 tons
- Length: 376 ft 5 in (114.73 m)
- Beam: 41 ft (12 m)
- Draft: 15 ft 8 in (4.78 m)
- Speed: 34 knots (63 km/h; 39 mph)
- Complement: 336 officers and enlisted
- Armament: 3 x 5 in (127 mm)/38 cal. guns; 8 x 20 mm cannons

USS Henry A. Wiley (DD-749/DM-29/MMD-29) was a Robert H. Smith-class destroyer minelayer in the United States Navy. She was named for Admiral Henry A. Wiley.

Henry A. Wiley was launched on 21 April 1944 as DD-749 by Bethlehem Steel Company, Staten Island, New York; sponsored by Mrs. Elizabeth W. Robb, daughter of Admiral Henry A. Wiley. The ship was reclassified DM-29 20 July 1944 and commissioned on 31 August 1944.

== Service history ==
After shakedown in the Caribbean Sea, the new minelayer rendezvoused with the battleships Texas, Arkansas, and Missouri and sailed 8 November for the Pacific to earn her nickname "Hammering Hank." Henry A. Wiley reached Pearl Harbor on 9 December to prepare for the impending Iwo Jima campaign. As escort to the battleship New York, she rendezvoused with other ships of the Gunfire and Covering Force off the rocky Japanese island on 16 February 1945, three days before the initial landings. She remained there until 9 March, to provide fire support and screen ships often operating a mere 400 yards (370 m) from Mount Suribachi. The minelayer poured some 3,600 rounds into the Japanese fortress.

A second and even more arduous campaign followed for Henry A. Wiley—Okinawa, the largest amphibious operation of the Pacific war. Reaching her position 23 March, D-day minus eight, she began to screen minesweepers as they cleared channels for transports and support ships. Japanese resistance was fierce and air attacks were almost unceasing. On 28 March, Henry A. Wiley downed two kamikaze planes, and the next morning in 15 hectic minutes saw a bomb explode 50 yards (46 m) astern, downed two more kamikazes, and rescued a downed fighter pilot. While screening transports on 1 April, D-day at Okinawa, Henry A. Wiley destroyed her fifth kamikaze.

The battle-tried ship then shifted to radar picket duty and spent a total of 34 days on this important task, alerting other ships of enemy air attacks. During this period, Henry A. Wiley took 64 Japanese aircraft under fire, destroying several of them. The morning of 4 May proved especially eventful. She began by downing a Mitsubishi G4M "Betty" at 0307. When her sister ship, Luce, was reported sinking, Henry A. Wiley proceeded to her aid, but came under heavy air attack. In less than a quarter-hour of heavy fighting, the ship splashed three kamikazes and two Baka bombers, one of which was closing from the starboard quarter when it was hit by Henry A. Wiley's accurate fire. It hit the water, bounced over the fantail, and exploded just off the port quarter. Having expended nearly 5,000 rounds of 5-inch and anti-aircraft ammunition, the minelayer then proceeded to rescue survivors from Luce. For her actions off Okinawa, which resulted in the destruction of 15 Japanese planes, Henry A. Wiley received the Presidential Unit Citation, and her skipper the Navy Cross and Legion of Merit.

From Okinawa, Henry A. Wiley sailed for the East China Sea, entering 12 June to screen minesweepers attempting to clear that vast body of water. She remained on this duty, with brief respites at Buckner Bay, until peace came. Even this duty was ushered in to the sound of "Hammering Hank's" guns, as on the night of 14 August, 24 hours before final orders to cease offensive operations against the Japanese were received, she went to General Quarters 6 times at the approach of aircraft, finally opening fire on the 6th run as an attack run commenced. Henry A. Wiley remained in the Pacific to screen and guide minesweepers through the end of 1945. She streamed her homeward bound pennant 17 January 1946 and on 7 February reached San Francisco, California via Eniwetok and Pearl Harbor. Henry A. Wiley decommissioned at San Francisco 29 January 1947 and went into reserve at San Diego, California. Henry A. Wiley was struck from the Naval Vessel Register on 15 October 1970 and sold for scrapping on 30 May 1972.

In addition to the Presidential Unit Commendation, Henry A. Wiley received four battle stars for her participation in World War II.

As of 2009, no other ship has been named Henry A. Wiley.
