= USS Maple (1893) =

Lighthouse tender in the US Navy

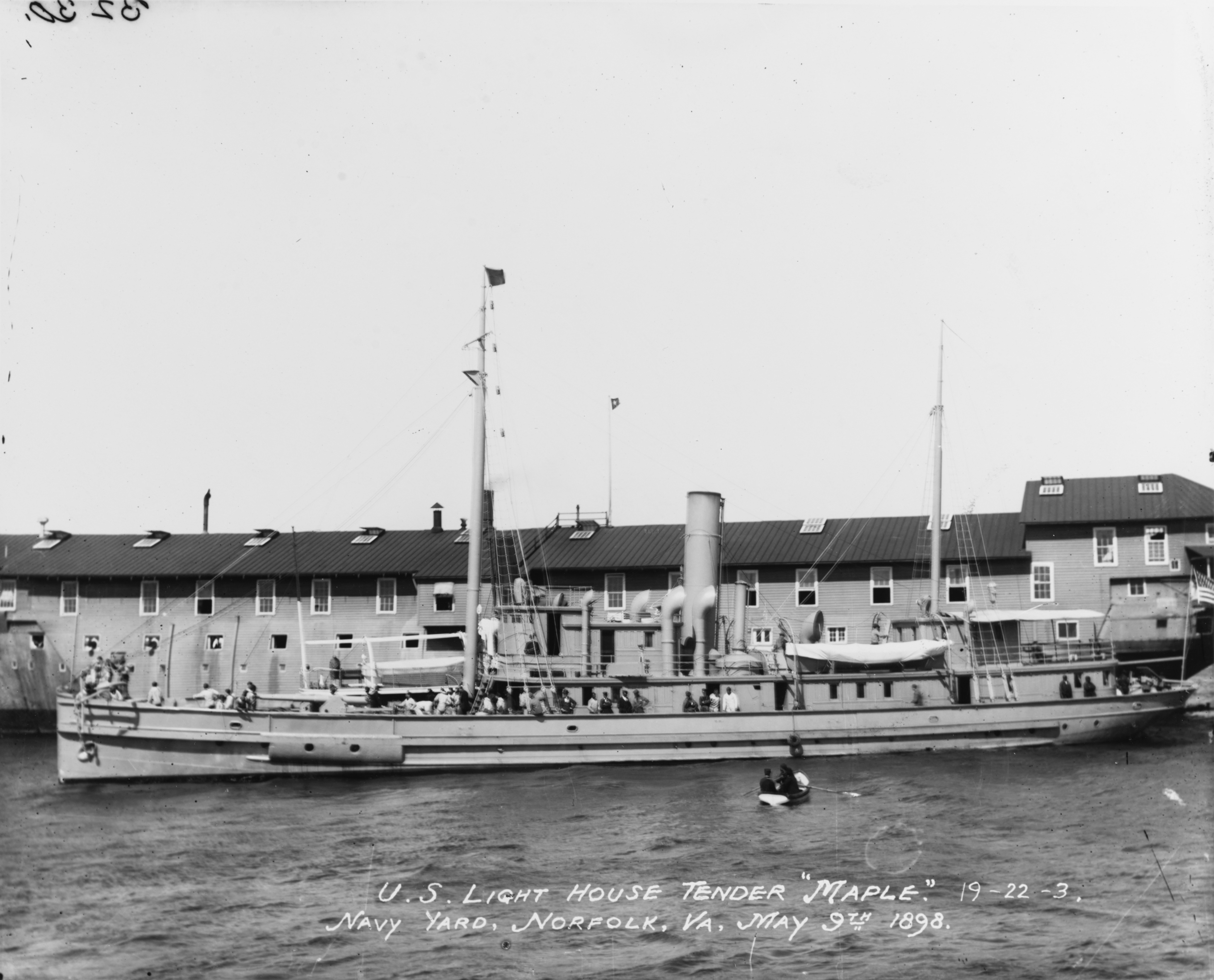
- USS Maple while under conversion for Spanish–American War service at the Norfolk Navy Yard in Portsmouth, Virginia, on 9 May 1898. The receiving ship USS Franklin is in the background.

History

United States Lighthouse Board
- Name: USLHT Maple
- Namesake: Maple, any of the trees and shrubs of the genus Acer
- Builder: Samuel L. Moore & Sons, Elizabethport, New Jersey
- Cost: $93,888.90
- Completed: 1893
- Acquired: 26 May 1893 (delivery)
- Fate: Transferred to U.S. Navy upon delivery
- Acquired: 6 February 1899 (from U.S. Navy)
- Commissioned: 1899
- Fate: Transferred to U.S. Lighthouse Service 1910

History

United States Navy
- Name: USS Maple
- Namesake: Previous name retained
- Acquired: May 1893 (from U.S. Lighthouse Board)
- Commissioned: June 1893
- Fate: Transferred to U.S. Lighthouse Board 6 February 1899
- Acquired: 11 April 1917 (from U.S. Lighthouse Service)
- Commissioned: 1 November 1918
- Decommissioned: 1 July 1919
- Fate: Transferred to U.S. Lighthouse Service 1 July 1919

History

United States Lighthouse Service
- Name: USLHT Maple
- Namesake: Previous name retained
- Acquired: 1910 (from U.S. Lighthouse Board)
- Fate: Transferred to U.S. Navy 11 April 1917
- Acquired: 1 July 1919 (from U.S. Navy)
- Decommissioned: 1933
- Fate: Sold into commercial service 29 October 1933; Converted into barge McLain No. 300; Later renamed Nichols No. 6; Scrapped 1949

General characteristics
- Type: Lighthouse tender
- Tonnage: 392 GRT
- Displacement: 799 long tons (812 t)
- Length: 164 ft (50.0 m) overall; 155 ft (47.2 m) between perpendiculars
- Beam: 30 ft (9.1 m)
- Draft: 1893: 11 ft 10 in (3.6 m); 1919: 7 ft 3 in (2.2 m) to 12 ft (3.7 m)
- Propulsion: 1893: Two coal-fired Scotch marine boilers, two 325-ihp (275-kw) compound fore-and-aft steam engines, two shafts; 1901: Boilers replaced; 1933: Engines removed
- Complement: 1893: 26; 1919: 30
- Armament: 1893: 2 × quick-firing guns (in U.S. Navy service); 1919: 2 × guns (in U.S. Navy service)

USS Maple, was a lighthouse tender that served in the United States Navy from 1893 to 1899, seeing service as an auxiliary ship during the Spanish–American War in 1898, and from 1917 to 1919, operating as a patrol vessel during World War I. She also served as USLHT Maple in the United States Lighthouse Board fleet from 1899 to 1910 and in the United States Lighthouse Service from 1910 to 1933.

== Construction and acquisition ==
USLHT Maple was built as a lighthouse tender in 1893 at Elizabethport, New Jersey. She was delivered to the United States Lighthouse Board on 26 May 1893. The Lighthouse Board transferred her to the United States Navy immediately upon delivery.

== Service history ==
=== U.S. Navy, 1893–1899 ===
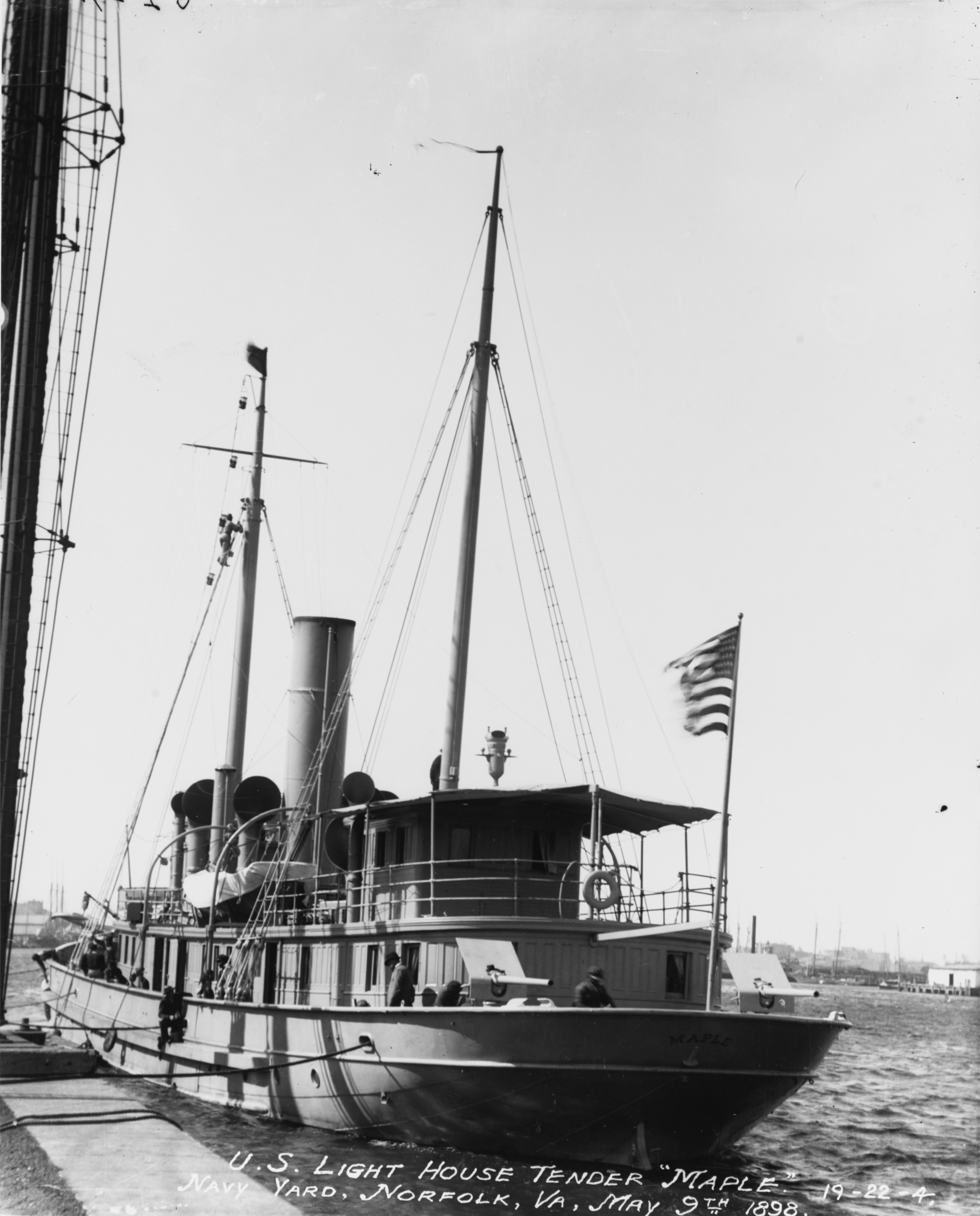
Maple undergoing conversion for Spanish–American War service at the Norfolk Navy Yard in Portsmouth, Virginia, on 9 May 1898.

The U.S. Navy commissioned the ship as USS Maple in June 1893. When the Spanish–American War broke out in April 1898, she was converted for war service at the Norfolk Navy Yard in Portsmouth, Virginia, her conversion including the installation of two quick-firing guns. After the completion of her conversion, she deployed to the Caribbean, where she operated with the U.S. Navy forces blockading Cuba. The war ended in August 1898, but Maple remained off Cuba until 20 September 1898. The Navy cited Maple for "conspicuous service" during the war.

After the war Maple underwent repairs. The Navy transferred her to the U.S. Lighthouse Board on 6 February 1899.

=== Lighthouse Board and Lighthouse Service, 1899–1917 ===
Once again USLHT Maple, the ship was assigned to lighthouse tender duty in the 5th Lighthouse District, with her home port at Baltimore, Maryland. In 1901, her Scotch marine boilers were replaced. While leaving the Old Point Dock at Norfolk, Virginia, on 20 June 1907 she struck the steamer Augusta on the port bow, doing US$500 in damage to Augusta . In 1910, the Lighthouse Board was abolished and replaced by the new United States Lighthouse Service, and Maple became part of the Lighthouse Service fleet.

=== U.S. Navy, 1917–1919 ===
The United States entered World War I on 6 April 1917, and on 11 April 1917, the Lighthouse Service transferred Maple to the U.S. Navy for war service. After Maple underwent conversion for naval service as a patrol vessel, the Navy commissioned her as USS Maple on 1 November 1918. Assigned to the 5th Naval District, Maple performed patrol duties off Norfolk, Virginia, through the end of the war on 11 November 1918 and in the war's aftermath until 1 July 1919, when the Navy both decommissioned her and transferred her back to the U.S. Lighthouse Service.

=== Lighthouse Service and commercial use, 1919–1949 ===
As USLHT Maple, the ship returned to lighthouse tender service for the Lighthouse Service. She continued these duties until she was decommissioned in 1933. She was sold into commercial service on 29 October 1933.

The ship's engines were removed before the end of 1933, and she was converted into the commercial barge Nichols No. 6. Later she was sold to the McLain Caroline Line, Inc., of New York City, which renamed her McLain No. 300. McClain No. 300 was retired from service in 1948 and scrapped in 1949.
