= USS Shea =

Robert H. Smith-class destroyer minelayer (1944–1958)

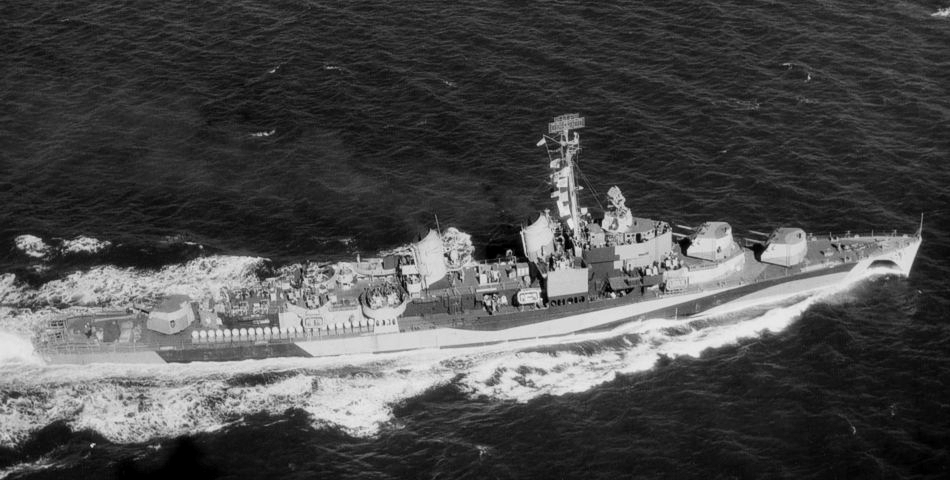

History

United States
- Name: Shea
- Builder: Bethlehem Mariners Harbor, Staten Island
- Laid down: 23 December 1943
- Launched: 20 May 1944
- Commissioned: 30 September 1944
- Decommissioned: 9 April 1958
- Stricken: 1 September 1973
- Fate: Sold for scrap, 1 September 1974

General characteristics
- Class & type: Robert H. Smith-class destroyer
- Displacement: 2,200 tons
- Length: 376 ft 6 in (114.76 m)
- Beam: 40 ft (12 m)
- Draft: 18 ft 8 in (5.69 m)
- Speed: 34.2 knots (63.3 km/h; 39.4 mph)
- Complement: 363 officers and enlisted
- Armament: 6 × 5 in (127 mm)/38 cal. guns (in 3 twin Mk 38 mounts); 12 × 40 mm Bofors AA guns (2 × 4, 2 × 2); 11 × 20 mm Oerlikon AA guns; 2 × Depth charge tracks; 4 × K-gun depth charge projectors; 80 × mines

USS Shea (DD-750/DM-30/MMD-30) was a Robert H. Smith-class destroyer minelayer in the United States Navy.

== Namesake ==
John Joseph Shea was born on 13 January 1898 in Cambridge, Massachusetts. He enlisted in the United States Naval Reserve Force (USNRF) on 11 June 1918. At the time of his release from active duty in 1919, he was promoted to the rank of Ensign. He was honorably discharged in 1921 and reappointed in 1923. With the abolition of the USNRF in 1925, he was transferred to the Fleet Reserve. In 1941, he was transferred to the Regular Navy in the rank of Lieutenant commander.

He was serving on the aircraft carrier USS Wasp on 15 September 1942, when it was torpedoed and sunk by the Imperial Japanese Navy. He directed the fight against the inferno on the carrier's flight deck and was leading out another hose to continue the struggle against the fires in a ready ammunition room when an explosion occurred. He probably died in that explosion, but, lacking concrete proof of death, he was declared missing in action until a year and a day later when he was declared legally dead. He was posthumously awarded the Navy Cross and Purple Heart medals and promoted to Commander.

== History ==
Shea was laid down on 23 December 1943 by Bethlehem Steel Company yard at Staten Island, New York, as DD-750, an Allen M. Sumner-class destroyer and launched on 20 May 1944; sponsored by Mrs. John J. Shea. The ship was modified to be a destroyer minelayer and redesignated DM-30 in late 1944; and commissioned at the New York Navy Yard on 30 September 1944.

Shea spent 15 more days completing her fitting-out. She then loaded ammunition at Earle and Bayonne, New Jersey, returned briefly to New York and departed for her shakedown cruise on 21 October 1944. She completed shakedown training at and around Great Sound Bay, Bermuda, and was underway for Norfolk, Virginia, on 16 November. Shea's crew underwent a month of further training in the Norfolk area before embarking, 13 December, for Brooklyn, New York, arriving the next day.

=== Marshall Islands ===
From Brooklyn, Shea moved on to San Francisco. Sailing with Task Group 27.3 (TG 27.3), she transited the Panama Canal, 20–22 December, and made San Francisco on the last day of 1944. Four days later, she was underway for Pearl Harbor, Hawaii, and 13 more days of training exercises. Another round of training complete, she steamed out of Pearl Harbor bound for Eniwetok Atoll in the western Pacific, arriving on 2 March. After 17 days in the vicinity of Eniwetok, her crew engaged in still more of the perennial training exercises. Shea departed for Ulithi Atoll on the first leg of her cruise into the real war at Okinawa.

=== Okinawa ===
On 19 March 1945, she sailed from Ulithi and joined TG 52.3. By 24 March, Shea was off Okinawa helping prepare the way for the 1 April invasion. While her primary mission was to protect and assist the minesweepers clearing the area of mines, she also stood radar picket duty all around Okinawa. During the period 24 March – 4 May, she was constantly fending off Japanese air attacks and guarding against enemy submarines. Moreover, she probably sank or severely damaged at least one submarine and, on 16 April, in the space of ten minutes, downed seven planes.

On the morning of 4 May 1945, Shea was en route to radar picket duty 20 miles northeast of Zampa Misaki, Okinawa. She arrived just after 06:00, having encountered two Japanese aircraft along the way, firing on both and possibly downing one. Upon receipt of reports indicating the approach of large Japanese air formations, Shea's crew went to General Quarters. Soon thereafter, a "considerable smoke haze blew over the ship from the Hagushi beaches" and "visibility was at a maximum 5.000 yards". At 08:54 a single Mitsubishi G4M "Betty" was sighted six miles distant; and, four minutes later, one was shot down by Shea-directed CAP. At 08:59, five minutes after the initial sighting, a lookout spotted a Japanese Yokosuka MXY-7 Ohka on Shea's starboard beam, closing the ship at better than 450 knots (830 km/h; 520 mph). Almost instantaneously, the Ohka crashed into Shea "on the starboard side of her bridge structure, entering the sonar room, traversing the chart house, passageway and batch, and exploding beyond the port side on the surface of the water. Fire broke out on the mess deck, and in CIC, the chart house, division commander's stateroom, No. 2 upper handling room, and compartment A-304-L."

Shea lost all ship's communications, 5-inch gun mounts numbers 1 and 2 were inoperative; and the forward port 20-millimeter guns were damaged. The main director was jammed and the gyro and computer rendered unserviceable. One officer and 34 men were killed, and 91 others were wounded to varying degrees.

With repair parties and survivors from damaged areas scurrying about, helping the wounded and fighting fires, Shea, listing 5 degrees to port, began limping off to Haeushi and medical assistance. She arrived there at 10:52; her most seriously wounded crew members were transferred to USS Crescent City; and the bodies of the 35 dead were removed for burial on Okinawa. Shea then resumed her limping, this time to Kerama Retto anchorage. At Kerama Retto, she underwent repairs and disgorged all but 10 percent of her ammunition. In addition, much of her gear, particularly radar and fighter direction equipment, was transferred to DesRon 2 for distribution to less severely damaged ships. After a memorial service on 11 May for her dead crewmen and the removal of some armament, Shea was underway on 15 May to join convoy OKU No. 4 (TU 51.29.9), heading for Ulithi Atoll.

Shea got underway from Ulithi on 27 May 1945 and, after a three-day layover at Pearl Harbor, departed for Philadelphia on 9 June. She arrived at the Philadelphia Navy Yard on 2 July, visiting San Diego and transiting the Panama Canal en route. Shea underwent extensive repairs and post-repair trials before leaving Philadelphia on 11 October for shakedown at Casco Bay, Maine. While in the area, Shea celebrated her first peacetime Navy Day at Bath, Maine.

From 1946 to late 1953, Shea was engaged in normal operations with the Atlantic Fleet. Assigned to Min-Div 2 and based at Charleston, South Carolina, she ranged the Atlantic seaboard and Caribbean Sea. This employment was interrupted late in 1950 by a Mediterranean cruise, during which she visited Trieste on a liaison mission with the British armed forces in the area. Shea returned to Charleston and the Atlantic Fleet on 1 February 1951 and remained so engaged until September 1953 when she reentered the Pacific.

Shea spent the remainder of her active service in the Pacific, based at Long Beach, California. She participated in numerous minelaying and antisubmarine exercises off the west coast, covering the area from Mexico north to British Columbia and west to Hawaii. In the spring of 1954, she made her only excursion out of that area when she took part in the atomic tests conducted at Eniwetok Atoll in the Marshall Islands. This was her first and only return to any of her old World War II haunts. She arrived back in Long Beach on 28 May and remained in the area until 9 April 1958 when she was placed out of commission in reserve. Shea continued in this reserve status until 1 September 1973 at which time, after being surveyed and deemed not to be up to fleet standards, she was stricken from the Navy list. She was sold for scrap on 1 September 1974.

Shea earned one battle star for her part in the Okinawa campaign during World War II.

As of 2009, no other ship has been named Shea.

== Citation ==
The Secretary of the Navy issued the following statement:

"For outstanding heroism in action while attached to an Amphibious Force during operations for the seizure of enemy Japanese-held Okinawa, Ryukyu Islands, from 24 March to 4 May 1945. Operation in waters protected by enemy mines and numerous suicide craft, the U.S.S. SHEA rendered distinctive service in providing effective cover for our minesweeper groups against hostile attack by air, surface, submarine, and shore fire. A natural and frequent target for heavy Japanese aerial attack, she fought her guns valiantly to down nine planes and assist in the destruction of three others, accounting for six of the total of nine within a period of ten minutes during action in April. After downing an attacking plane on 4 May, the SHEA turned her guns on a second plane which came in out of the sun, maintaining furious fire on the high-speed target until it struck her superstructure on the starboard side, penetrating the bridge without exploding and emerged on the port side to explode and perforate the side with shrapnel. Saved from complete destruction by prompt damage control measures, the SHEA had achieved a record of gallantry in combat, reflecting the highest credit upon her courageous and skilled officers and men and upon the United States Naval Service."

All personnel attached to and serving on board the U.S.S. SHEA from 24 March to 4 May 1945, are authorized to wear the NAVY UNIT COMMENDATION Ribbon.

/s/ John L. Sullivan, Secretary of the Navy
