= USS Anthony (DD-172) =

Wickes-class destroyer

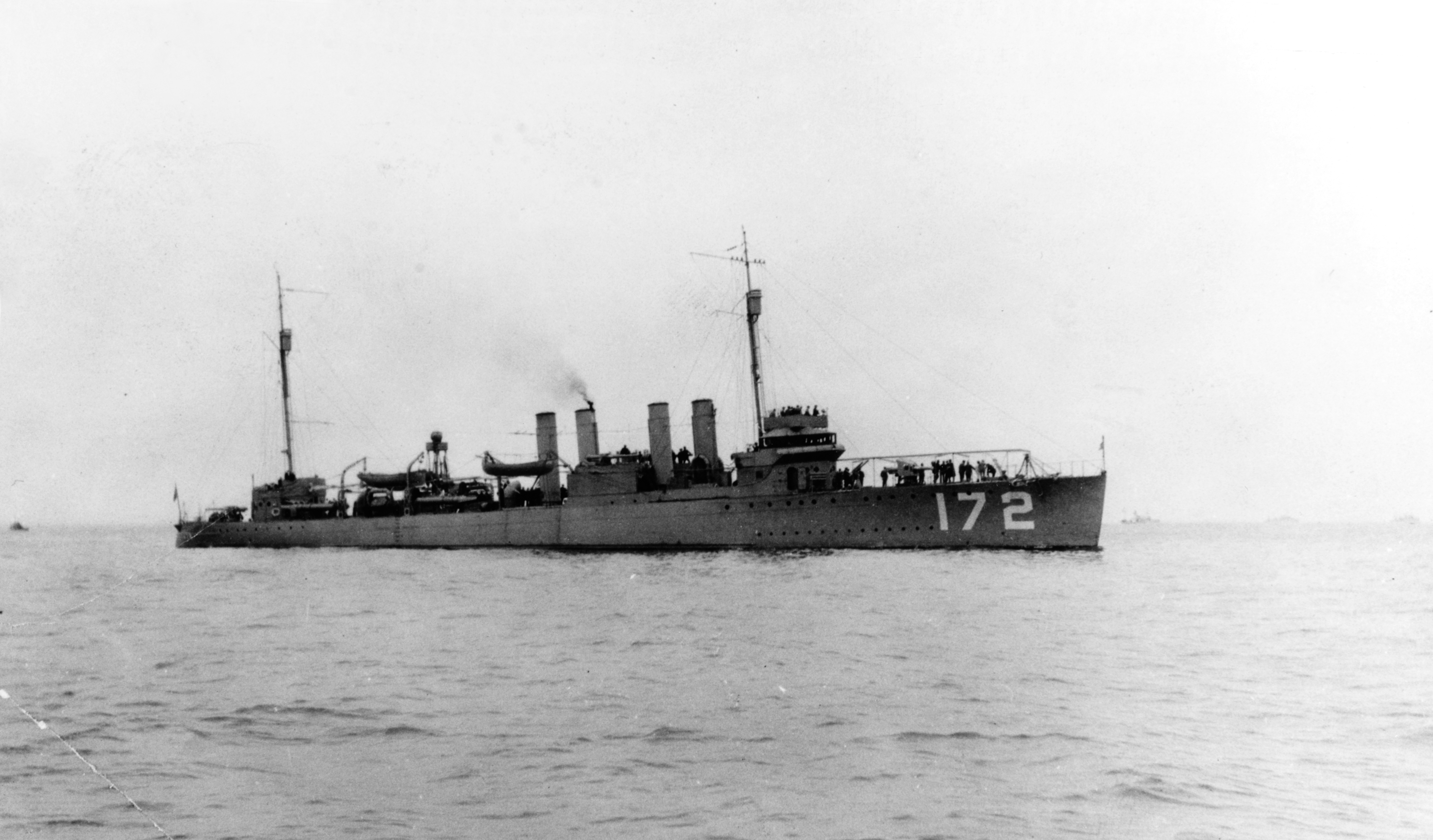
- USS Anthony, in Pacific Coast waters, circa 1920

History

United States
- Namesake: William Anthony
- Builder: Union Iron Works, San Francisco, California
- Cost: $1,395,393 (hull and machinery)
- Laid down: 18 April 1918
- Launched: 10 August 1918
- Commissioned: 19 June 1919
- Decommissioned: 30 June 1922
- Reclassified: DM-12, 16 November 1920
- Stricken: 1 December 1936
- Fate: Sunk as target, 22 July 1937

General characteristics
- Class & type: Wickes-class destroyer
- Displacement: 1,202–1,208 long tons (1,221–1,227 t) (standard); 1,295–1,322 long tons (1,316–1,343 t) (deep load)
- Length: 314 ft 4 in (95.8 m)
- Beam: 30 ft 11 in (9.42 m)
- Draught: 9 ft 10 in (3.0 m)
- Installed power: 27,000 shp (20,000 kW); 4 water-tube boilers
- Propulsion: 2 shafts, 2 steam turbines
- Speed: 35 knots (65 km/h; 40 mph) (design)
- Range: 2,500 nautical miles (4,600 km; 2,900 mi) at 20 knots (37 km/h; 23 mph) (design)
- Complement: 6 officers, 108 enlisted men
- Armament: 4 × single 4-inch (102 mm) guns; 2 × single 1-pounder AA guns; 4 × triple 21 inch (533 mm) torpedo tubes; 2 × depth charge rails

USS Anthony (DD-172) was a Wickes-class destroyer built for the United States Navy during World War I.

== Description ==
The Wickes class was an improved and faster version of the preceding Caldwell-class. Two different designs were prepared to the same specification that mainly differed in the turbines and boilers used. The ships built to the Bethlehem Steel design, built in the Fore River and Union Iron Works shipyards, mostly used Yarrow boilers that deteriorated badly during service and were mostly scrapped during the 1930s. The ships displaced 1,202–1,208 long tons (1,221–1,227 t) at standard load and 1,295–1,322 long tons (1,316–1,343 t) at deep load. They had an overall length of 314 feet 4 inches (95.8 m), a beam of 30 feet 11 inches (9.4 m) and a draught of 9 feet 10 inches (3.0 m). They had a crew of 6 officers and 108 enlisted men.

Performance differed radically between the ships of the class, often due to poor workmanship. The Wickes class was powered by two steam turbines, each driving one propeller shaft, using steam provided by four water-tube boilers. The turbines were designed to produce a total of 27,000 shaft horsepower (20,000 kW) intended to reach a speed of 35 knots (65 km/h; 40 mph). The ships carried 225 long tons (229 t) of fuel oil which was intended gave them a range of 2,500 nautical miles (4,600 km; 2,900 mi) at 20 knots (37 km/h; 23 mph).

The ships were armed with four 4-inch (102 mm) guns in single mounts and were fitted with two 1-pounder guns for anti-aircraft defense. Their primary weapon, though, was their torpedo battery of a dozen 21 inch (533 mm) torpedo tubes in four triple mounts. In many ships a shortage of 1-pounders caused them to be replaced by 3-inch (76 mm) anti-aircraft (AA) guns. They also carried a pair of depth charge rails. A "Y-gun" depth charge thrower was added to many ships.

== Construction and career ==
Anthony, named for Marine Sergeant Major William Anthony, was launched 10 August 1918 by Union Iron Works, San Francisco, California; sponsored by Miss Grace Heathcote; commissioned 19 June 1919 and reported to Destroyer Division Pacific. Anthony operated on the west coast between San Diego and Bremerton, Washington, until June 1921. She sailed on 8 September 1919 from San Francisco to Port Angeles, Washington, to attend the ceremonies of the newly organized Pacific Fleet. Anthony visited Victoria, British Columbia, 11 September and returned Secretary of the Navy Josephus Daniels to Bremerton on 12 September. On 13 September she passed review, with other units of the fleet, before President Woodrow Wilson in Oregon (BB-3) and, on 14 September before the Secretary of the Navy.

On 16 November 1920 Anthony was designated a light minelayer, DM-12. In October 1921 she joined Mine Division 1, Mine Squadron 2 and operated in the Pearl Harbor area until placed out of commission on 30 June 1922 at Pearl Harbor. She was towed to San Diego in 1937, used as a target, and sunk off the California coast on 22 July 1937.
