= USS J. William Ditter =

Robert H. Smith-class destroyer minelayer

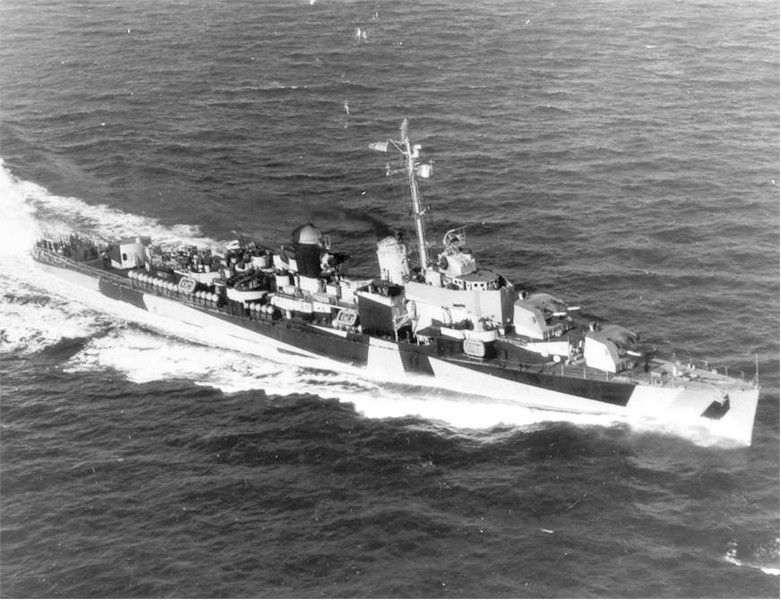
- At Norfolk, January 1945, in camouflage Measure 32, Design 3d.

History

United States
- Name: J. William Ditter
- Builder: Bethlehem Shipbuilding Corporation, Staten Island, New York
- Launched: 4 July 1944
- Commissioned: 28 October 1944
- Decommissioned: 28 September 1945
- Fate: Scrapped in July 1946

General characteristics
- Class & type: Robert H. Smith-class destroyer
- Displacement: 2,200 tons
- Length: 376 ft 6 in (114.76 m)
- Beam: 40 ft 10 in (12.45 m)
- Draft: 14 ft 2 in (4.32 m)
- Speed: 36.5 knots (67.6 km/h; 42.0 mph)
- Complement: 336 officers and enlisted
- Armament: 6 x 5 in (127 mm)/38 cal. guns; 12 x 40 mm guns; 8 x 20 mm cannons; 2 x depth charge tracks; 4 x depth charge projectors

USS J. William Ditter (DD-751/DM-31) was a Robert H. Smith-class destroyer minelayer in the United States Navy. She was named for Congressman J. William Ditter. J. William Ditter was launched as DD-751 by Bethlehem Shipbuilding Corporation, Staten Island, New York, 4 July 1944; sponsored by Mrs. J. William Ditter, widow of Congressman Ditter. The ship was reclassified DM-31 19 July 1944; and commissioned at New York Navy Yard 28 October 1944.

== Service history ==
=== October 1944 - May 1945 ===
J. William Ditter completed her shakedown off Bermuda in December. She sailed from Norfolk, Virginia 13 January 1945, and after transiting the Panama Canal and touching at San Diego, California arrived Pearl Harbor 10 February.

==== Battle of Okinawa ====
As the Navy's island-hopping thrust toward Japan reached its climax, Ditter sailed 2 March for Eniwetok and Ulithi, departing the latter base 19 March for Okinawa. She arrived 25 March off the critical island, soon to be the scene of the largest amphibious assault of the Pacific war, and began hazardous minesweeping operations. The next day she dodged a torpedo during an encounter with a Japanese submarine. On 29 March she discovered two suicide boats off Okinawa, and sank one of them with gunfire. By the day of the invasion, 1 April, Ditter and her sister mine-craft had swept the channels and laid marker buoys, contributing importantly to the success of the initial landing. Next day her duties shifted to convoy escort, as the versatile ship protected transports on night retirement away from Okinawa. On the night of 2 April the ship shot down two bombers, and she continued to come under air attack in the days that followed as the' Japanese made an effort to stop the invasion with kamikaze tactics.

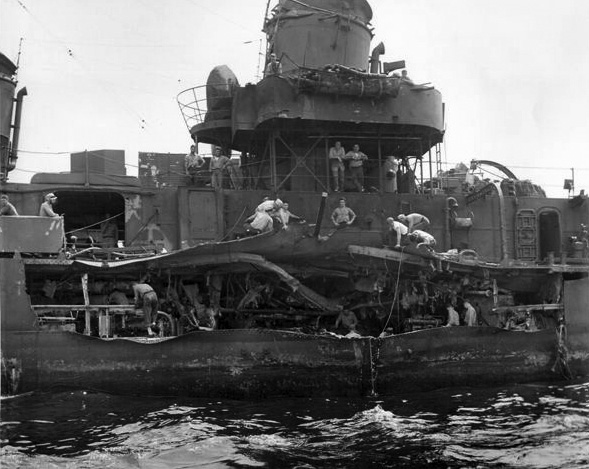
The kamikaze damage sustained in 1945.

J. William Ditter was assigned radar picket duty 12 April, and, subsequently, became the target of heavy air attack. She shot down several planes and assisted with several more until retiring to Kerama Retto 30 April. The ship was soon back on picket duty, however, and engaged in numerous battles with Japanese aircraft.

=== June 1945 - July 1946 ===
While patrolling with Harry F. Bauer and Ellyson 6 June, J. William Ditter was attacked by a large group of kamikazes. The ship's gun crews downed five of the planes; but a sixth glanced off her No. 2 stack; and another crashed into her on the port side near the main deck. The ship lost all power and suffered many casualties; but damage control kept her afloat until she could be towed by tug Ute to Kerama Retto the next day. Eventually she was repaired enough to steam to Saipan on 10 July and begin the voyage home. She touched at San Diego and the Canal Zone before arriving New York 12 July 1945. J. William Ditter was decommissioned there on 28 September 1945 and was scrapped in July 1946.

== Merits and legacy ==
J. William Ditter received one battle star for World War II service.

As of 2009, no other ship has been named J. William Ditter.
