= Gangwon-class destroyer =

Destroyers of the South Korean Navy

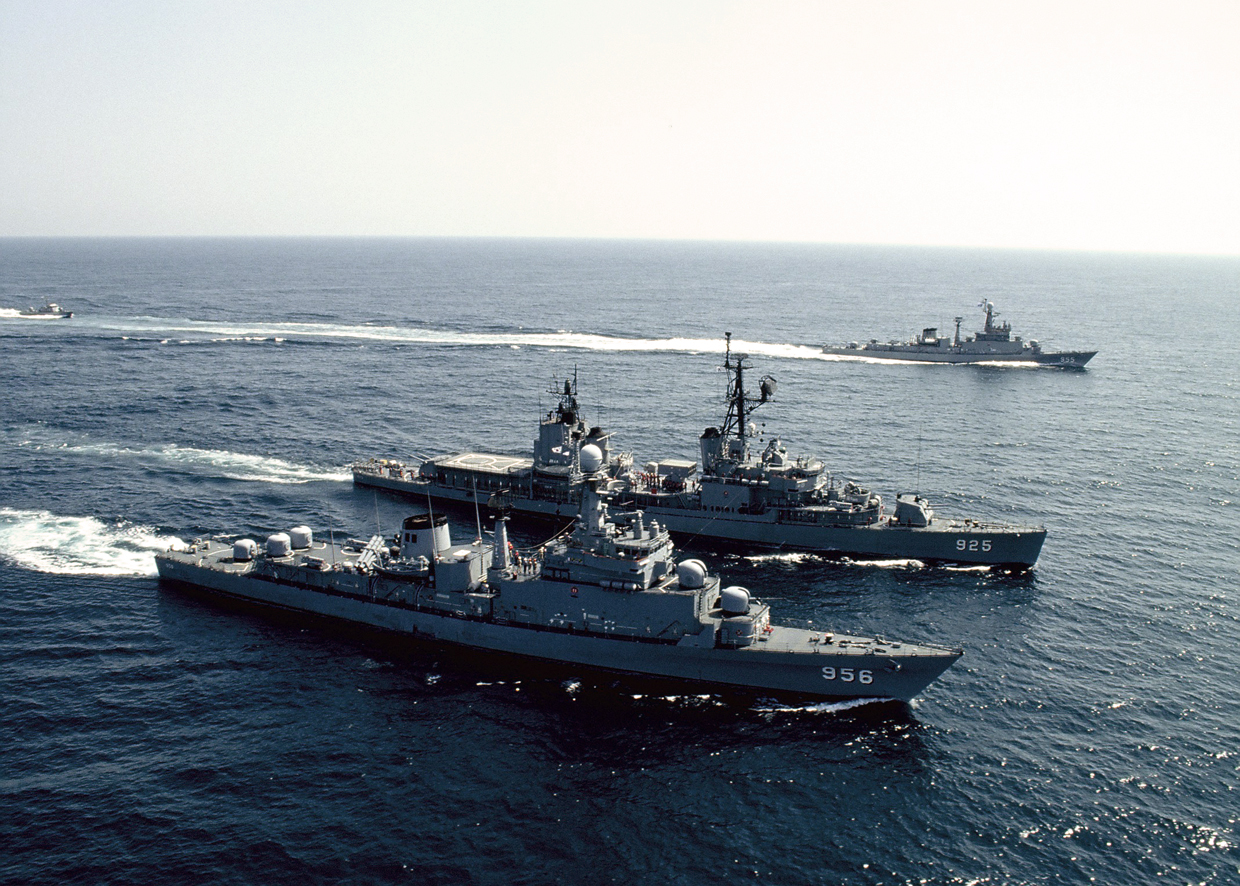
- ROKS Jeonju

Class overview
- Name: Gangwon
- Builders: Federal Shipbuilding and Drydock Company; Consolidated Steel Corporation; Bath Iron Works
- Operators: Republic of Korea Navy
- Preceded by: Daegu class
- Succeeded by: Gwanggaeto the Great class
- Subclasses: Gearing class
- Built: 1944-1946
- In commission: 1974-2001
- Planned: 5
- Completed: 5
- Retired: 5
- Preserved: ROKS Jeonju

General characteristics
- Type: Destroyer
- Displacement: 2,616 long tons (2,658 t) standard; 3,460 long tons (3,516 t) full
- Length: 390.5 ft (119.0 m)
- Beam: 40.9 ft 10 in (12.72 m)
- Draft: 14.3 ft 8 in (4.56 m)
- Propulsion: 4 × GM Mod. 16-278A diesel engines with electric drive, 60,000 shp (45 MW); 2 × screws
- Speed: 36.8 knots (68.2 km/h; 42.3 mph)
- Range: 4,500 nmi (8,300 km) at 20 kn (37 km/h; 23 mph)
- Complement: 350
- Sensors & processing systems: 1 × AN/SPS-10B surface-search radar; 1 × AN/SPS-37 air-search radar; 1 × AN/WLR-1 radar warning receiver; 1 × Mark 37 Director
- Electronic warfare & decoys: 1 × AN/ULQ-6 ECM; 1 × T-Mk 6 Fanfare
- Armament: 1970s: 2 × twin 5"/38 cal guns; 2 × triple Mark 46 torpedo tubes; 2 × quad RGM-84C Harpoons; 1 × RUR-5 ASROC; 2 × Mark 10 Hedgehog mortars; 1 × depth charge track; 1980s: 2 × twin 5"/38 cal guns; 1 × twin 40 mm bofors; 2 × Sea Vulcan; 1 × RUR-5 ASROC; 2 × twin RGM-84C Harpoons; 2 × triple Mark 46 torpedo tubes; 2 × Mark 10 Hedgehog mortars; 1 × depth charge track
- Aircraft carried: 1 × Aérospatiale Alouette III
- Aviation facilities: Single hangar and helipad

The Gangwon class was a class of 5 destroyers of the Republic of Korea Navy. They entered service in 1974; the last one was decommissioned in 2001.

== History ==
These were ships used by the U.S. Navy during World War II and were modernized in electronics and weaponry during FRAM I. Throughout the 1970s, they constituted the backbone of the Republic of Korea Navy as a replacement for Chungmu-class destroyers. They remained in service until well into the 1990s. Initially leased till 1977, the ships were later purchased outright by the South Korean navy.

The Republic of Korea Navy acquired five destroyers of the Gearing class for the Republic of Korea Navy from the USA in 1974 as part of the American Military Assistance Program. More were later leased over in later years.

The last of these ships was decommissioned in 2001.

== Ships in the class ==
Pennant	Name	Builders	Laid down	Launched	Commissioned	Decommissioned
DD-99 / DD-919	Taejon	Consolidated Steel Corporation	14 April 1945	18 August 1945	23 February 1977	February 2001
DD-921	Gwangju	Bath Iron Works	31 July 1945	2 March 1946	23 February 1977	29 December 2000
DD-922	Gangwon	Federal Shipbuilding and Drydock Company	19 October 1944	8 July 1945	1978	2000
DD-923	Gyeonggi	Consolidated Steel Corporation	10 October 1944	17 March 1945	1981	1997
DD-924	Jeonju	Consolidated Steel Corporation	3 June 1944	20 November 1944	11 August 1981	31 December 1999

== See also ==
- List of destroyer classes

Equivalent destroyers of the same era

- Type 051
- Tachikaze class
- Sovremenny class
- Type 42
- Spruance class
- Iroquois class
- Audace class
