= Daegu-class destroyer =

Destroyers of the South Korean Navy

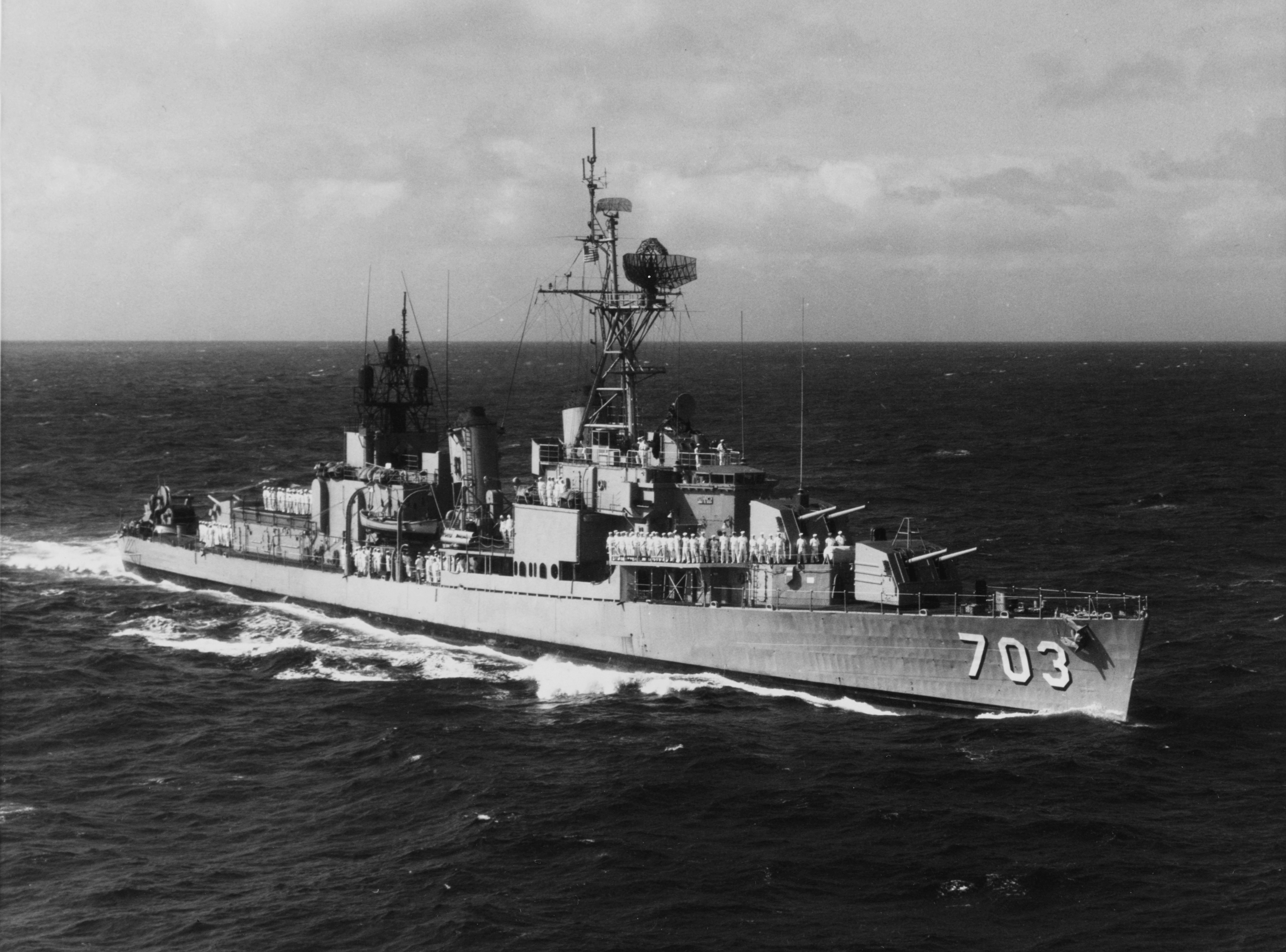
- ROKS Daegu as USS Wallace L. Lind

Class overview
- Name: Daegu
- Builders: Federal Shipbuilding and Drydock Company; Bath Iron Works
- Operators: Republic of Korea Navy
- Preceded by: Chungbuk class
- Succeeded by: Kangwon class
- Subclasses: Allen M. Sumner class
- Built: 1943-1944
- In commission: 1973-1994
- Planned: 2
- Completed: 2
- Retired: 2

General characteristics
- Type: Destroyer
- Length: 376 ft 6 in (114.76 m)
- Beam: 40 ft (12 m)
- Draft: 15 ft 8 in (4.78 m)
- Propulsion: 60,000 shp (45,000 kW); 2 shafts
- Speed: 34 kn (63 km/h; 39 mph)
- Range: 6,500 nmi (12,000 km; 7,500 mi) at 15 kn (28 km/h; 17 mph)
- Complement: 336
- Sensors & processing systems: 1 × AN/SPS-6 air-search radar; 1 × AN/SPS-10 surface-search radar; 1 × AN/SQS-29 sonar; 1 × Mark 37 Director
- Electronic warfare & decoys: 1 × AN/WLR-1 ECM
- Armament: 1970s: 3 × twin 5"/38 cal guns; 2 × triple Mark 46 torpedo tubes; 2 × twin RGM-84A Harpoons; 2 × Mark 10 Hedgehog mortars; 1 × depth charge track; 2 × Sea Vulcan; 1980s: 2 × twin 5"/38 cal guns; 2 × triple Mark 46 torpedo tubes; 2 × twin RGM-84A Harpoons; 1 × twin 40 mm bofors; 2 × Mark 10 Hedgehog mortars; 1 × depth charge track
- Aircraft carried: 1 × Aérospatiale Alouette III
- Aviation facilities: Single hangar and helipad

The Daegu class was a class of 2 destroyers by the Republic of Korea Navy. They entered service in 1973, with the last one being decommissioned in 1994.

== History ==
These were ships used by the US Navy during World War II and were modernized in electronics and weaponry during FRAM II. They were once magnificent ships, which throughout the 1970s constituted the backbone of the Republic of Korea Navy as a replacement for Chungmu class destroyers. Eventually, they were deemed too outdated. However, they remained in service until well into the 1990s, when they were downright obsolete. They were all leased till 1977 then bought by the navy.

They received two destroyers of the Allen M. Sumner class for the Republic of Korea Navy from the US in 1973 as part of the American Military Assistance Program. More were later leased over in later years.

They were all put out of service between 1973 till 1994.

== Ships in the class ==
Pennant	Name	Builders	Laid down	Launched	Commissioned	Decommissioned
DD-17 / DD-917	Daegu	Federal Shipbuilding and Drydock Company	14 February 1944	14 June 1944	4 December 1973	1994-12-30
DD-18 / DD-918	Incheon	Bath Iron Works	9 August 1943	9 January 1944	5 December 1973	1994-12-30

== See also ==
- List of destroyer classes

Equivalent destroyers of the same era

- Perth class
- Minegumo class
- Fante class
- Type 82
- Mod Kashin class
