= Chungbuk-class destroyer =

Destroyers of the Republic of Korea Navy

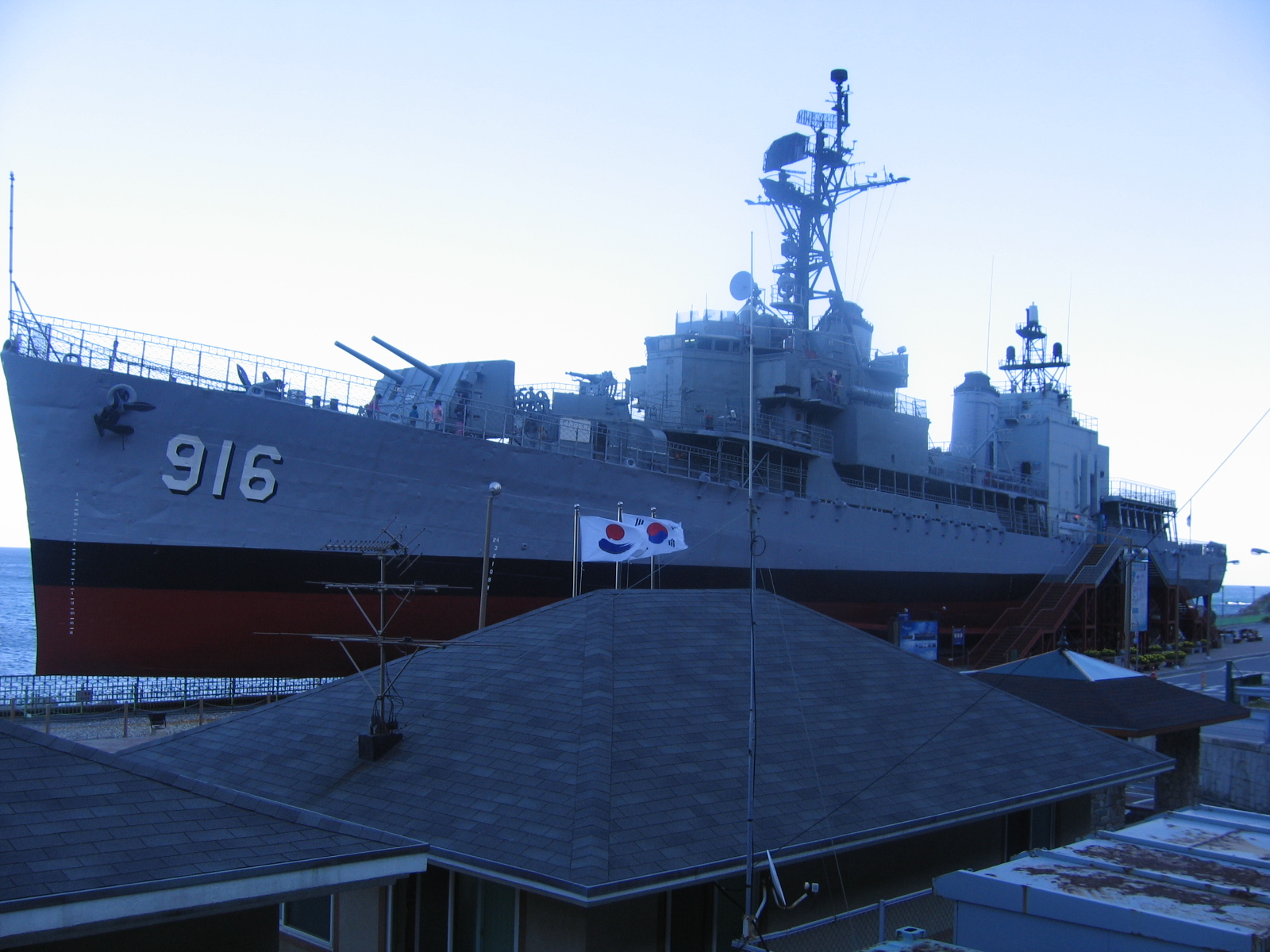
- ROKS Jeonbuk

Class overview
- Name: Chungbuk
- Builders: Bath Iron Works
- Operators: Republic of Korea Navy
- Preceded by: Chungmu class
- Succeeded by: Daegu class
- Built: 1944-1945
- In commission: 1972—2001
- Planned: 7
- Retired: 7
- Preserved: 1

General characteristics
- Type: Destroyer
- Displacement: 2,616 long tons (2,658 t) standard; 3,460 long tons (3,516 t) full
- Length: 390.5 ft (119.0 m)
- Beam: 40.9 ft 10 in (12.72 m)
- Draft: 14.3 ft 8 in (4.56 m)
- Propulsion: 4 × GM Mod. 16-278A diesel engines with electric drive, 60,000 shp (45 MW); 2 × screws
- Speed: 36.8 knots (68.2 km/h; 42.3 mph)
- Range: 4,500 nmi (8,300 km) at 20 kn (37 km/h; 23 mph)
- Complement: 350
- Sensors & processing systems: 1 × AN/SPS-10B surface-search radar; 1 × AN/SPS-37 air-search radar; 1 × AN/WLR-1 radar warning receiver; 1 × Mark 37 Director
- Electronic warfare & decoys: 1 × AN/ULQ-6 ECM; 1 × T-Mk 6 Fanfare
- Armament: 1970s: 3 × twin 5"/38 cal guns; 2 × quad 40 mm bofors; 2 × twin RGM-84A Harpoons; 1 × Phalanx CIWS (Chungbuk); 1 × twin Emerlec-30 guns (Jeonbuk); 2 × triple Mark 46 torpedo tubes; 2 × Mark 10 Hedgehog mortars; 1 × depth charge track; 1980s: 2 × twin 5"/38 cal guns; 1 × Sea Vulcan; 2 × Sea Vulcan (Jeonbuk); 1 × twin Emerlec-30 gun (Jeonbuk); 2 × twin RGM-84A Harpoons; 2 × triple Mark 46 torpedo tubes; 2 × Mark 10 Hedgehog mortars; 1 × depth charge track; 1990s; 2 × twin 5"/38 cal guns; 1 × twin 40 mm bofors; 2 × triple Mark 46 torpedo tubes; 2 × Mark 10 Hedgehog mortars; 1 × depth charge track
- Aircraft carried: 1 × Aérospatiale Alouette III
- Aviation facilities: Single hangar and helipad

The Chungbuk-class was a class of 7 destroyers, formerly the United States' Gearing-class destroyer, that were transferred to and commissioned by the Republic of Korea Navy. They entered service in 1972, with the last one being decommissioned in 2001.

== History ==
These were ships used by the US Navy during World War II and were modernized in electronics and weaponry during FRAM II. They were once magnificent ships, which throughout the 1970s constituted the backbone of the Republic of Korea Navy as a replacement for Chungmu class destroyers. Eventually, they were deemed too outdated. However, they remained in service until well into the 1990s, when they were downright obsolete. They were all leased till 1977 then bought by the navy.

They received two destroyers of the Gearing class for the Republic of Korea Navy from the US in 1972 as part of the American Military Assistance Program. More were later leased over in later years.

== Ships in the class ==
Name	Hull Number	FRAM	Commissioned	Decommissioned	Status	References
ROKS Chungbuk	DD-915		1972	December 2000	Former DD-805 Chevalier, decommissioned	
ROKS Jeonbuk	DD-916		1972	December 1999	Former DD-830 Everett F. Larson, decommissioned	
ROKS Daejeon	DD-919		1977	February 2001	Former DD-818 New, decommissioned and used as a museum ship until scrapped	
ROKS Gwangju	DD-921		1977	December 2000	Former DD-849 Richard E. Kraus, decommissioned	
ROKS Gangwon	DD-922		1978	December 2000	Former DD-714 William R. Rush, decommissioned	
ROKS Gyeonggi	DD-923		1978	1997	Former DD-883 Newman K. Perry, decommissioned	
ROKS Jeonju	DD-925		1981	December 1999	Former DD-876 Rogers, decommissioned and used as a museum ship	

== See also ==
- List of destroyer classes

Equivalent destroyers of the same era

- Takatsuki class
- Fante class
- Type 42
- Mod Kashin class
