= AN/ULQ-6 =

Shipboard electronic warfare suite

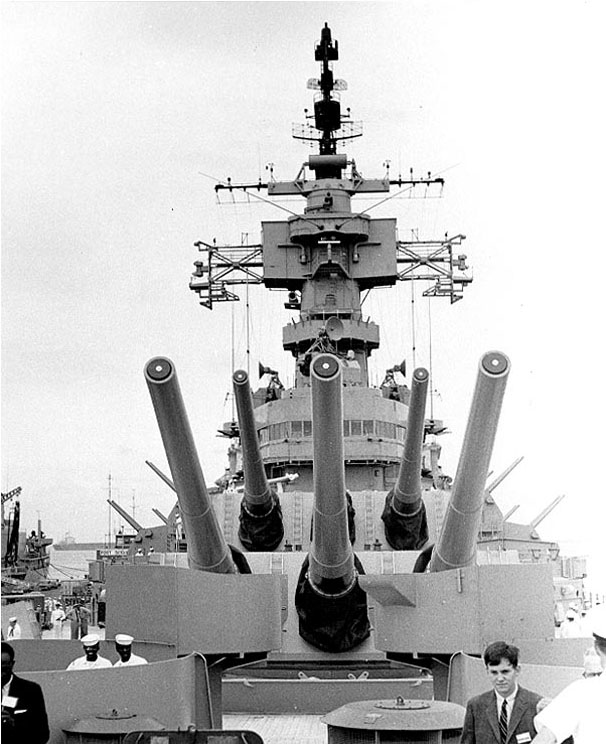
USS New Jersey, with large ULQ-6 ECM system antenna on her fire control tower.

The AN/ULQ-6 was an electronic countermeasure (ECM) deception repeater and false-target generator used by the United States Navy, primarily on destroyers and frigates. It was often used in combination with the AN/WLR-1 countermeasures receiver, and both were replaced by the AN/SLQ-32 electronic warfare suite. The ULQ-6 was also used by the Brazilian Navy on Marcílio Dias and Mato Grosso-class destroyers, Royal Canadian Navy on Iroquois-class destroyers, Republic of Korea Navy on Chungbuk and Gangwon-class destroyers.

In accordance with the Joint Electronics Type Designation System (JETDS), the AN/ULQ-6 designation represents the 6th design of an Army-Navy electronic device for a general utility countermeasures special/combination system. The JETDS system also now is used to name all Department of Defense and some NATO electronic systems.

== Technical description ==
There are several different electronic jamming techniques. Among them, the ULQ-6 employs deception repeater jamming and false-target generation. Commonly referred to as digital radio frequency memory (DRFM), the jammer digitizes characteristics of the threat radar, stores them, then uses those to broadcast back to the threat radar in deceptive ways. In the case of the AN/ULQ-6, the received signal was amplified, when transmitted back to the threat radar, to a power density equivalent to that of a capital ship like an aircraft carrier. In this way, the smaller ship with the ULQ-6 repeating jammer would appear to the threat radar as a much larger target ship.

Typically, two ULQ-6 systems were employed on a ship at opposing sides, 180° from each other. The combined antennas of the two provided doughnut shaped patterns covering a 360° azimuth around the ship. The antenna section of each system had fixed donut-shaped upper and lower elements, with a trainable array element between them. This allowed the creation of a scannable beam in addition to a full-circle interference beam. Initially, it was only capable of operating in the 7–11 GHz (4.28–2.73 cm) range (I-band), but later was expanded to cover the 4–8 GHz (7.49–3.75 cm) range (G and H-bands). (Note: The terms G/H/I-bands are outdated NATO terminology for the bands. In more modern usage, Institute of Electrical and Electronics Engineers (IEEE) terms are more commonly used. Thus, G/H/I-bands together cover the IEEE's C- and X-bands)

Each AN/ULQ-6 was paired with the AN/WLR-1 electronic support measures radar warning receiver, widely deployed in the fleet at the time. The combination ULQ-6/WLR-1 sampled incoming signals at a rate of 4 Mbps, representing amplitude characteristics by 4 bits, resulting in an instantaneous bandwidth of 10–550 MHz across an expanded operational spectrum of 2–18 GHz (14.99–1.67 cm).

== History ==
Adapted in 1959 from the AN/ALQ-32 airborne ECM system, the ULQ-6 for ships was envisioned as a countermeasure against Soviet anti-ship missiles like the SS-N-2 Styx or the AS-1 Kennel. Originally operating at frequencies from 8–10 GHz (3.75–3.00 cm), the jamming system eventually covered from 4–10 GHz (7.49–3.00 cm) in all. The system remained an integral part of fleet ECM through the 1970s, and was teamed up with the AN/WLR-1 electronic support measures radar warning receiver.

The system was improved over time, available in three versions:

- AN/ULQ-6A — The first model having a peak transmit power of 1 kilowatt with the ability to create false targets, and functioned as a track breaker.
- AN/ULQ-6B — Late 1960s saw an improved version, featuring range gate pull-off (RGPO) functionality causing range errors to threat radars, and an increased peak transmit power of 25 kW (average 1 kW).
- AN/ULQ-6C — An improved model with a narrower transmission beam, provided to aircraft carriers and other capital ships, to make them appear to be smaller less appealing targets.

By the mid-1970s, the system was upgraded to the AN/SLQ-30, adding a channelized SLR-12 receiver and a spinning direction finding antenna to the ULQ-6B and ULQ-6C systems. However, it was thought that outdated systems such as this were becoming increasingly difficult to counter the growing threat of modern anti-ship missiles. In May 1977, an order was placed for the development of the Raytheon AN/SLQ-32, a modular, commonly designed radio detection and jamming system, which began service in 1979. Many of the ships equipped with the ULQ-6 jammer were gradually converted to the SLQ-32.

By 1990, the Government Accounting Office reported US$38 (equivalent to $91.46 in 2024) million worth of ULQ-6 assets were stored in Navy supply systems after removal from the fleet. Installed in the early 1990s, aboard the Royal Canadian Navy's Iroquois-class destroyers, the ULQ-6 were replaced in 1999 by Shield and Nulka decoy systems.

== See also ==
- List of military electronics of the United States
