= USS Hickox =

Fletcher-class destroyer

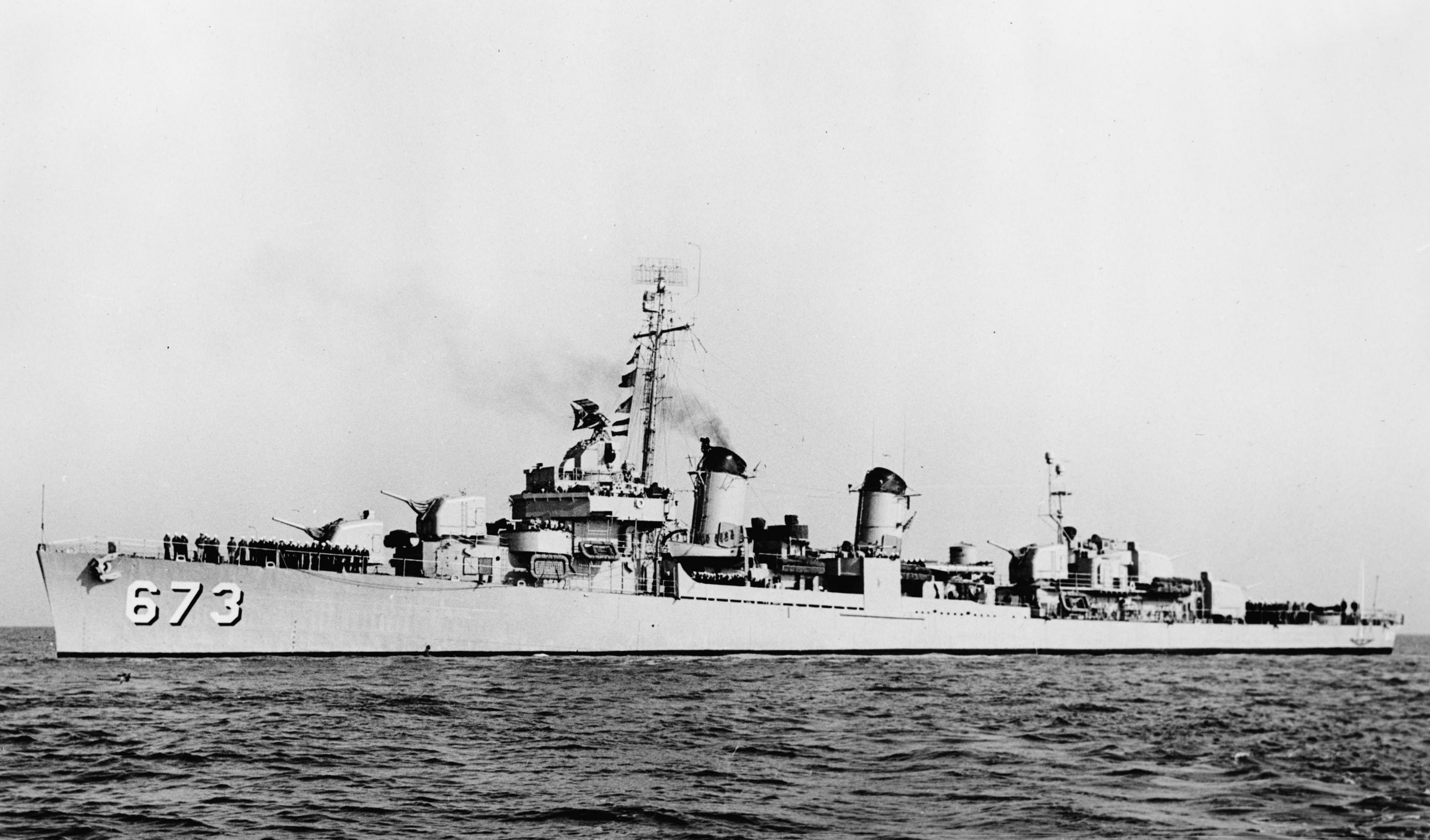
- USS Hickox underway on 23 September 1951

History

United States
- Name: Hickox
- Namesake: Ralph Hickox
- Builder: Federal Shipbuilding and Drydock Company
- Laid down: 12 March 1943
- Launched: 4 July 1943
- Sponsored by: Mrs. Ralph Hickox
- Commissioned: 10 September 1943
- Decommissioned: 10 December 1946
- Recommissioned: 19 May 1951
- Decommissioned: 20 December 1957
- Stricken: 2 June 1975
- Identification: Callsign: NKIJ; Hull number: DD-673
- Motto: Inveniemus Viam Aut Faciemus; (I Shall Either Find a Way or Make One)
- Honours and awards: See Awards
- Fate: Transferred to South Korea, 15 November 1968
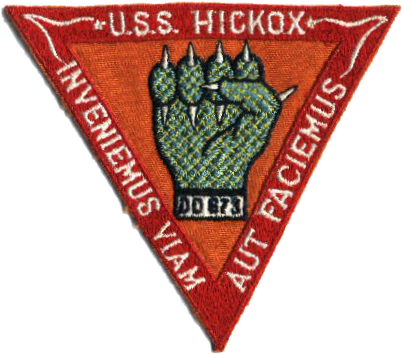
- Badge

South Korea
- Name: Busan
- Namesake: Busan
- Acquired: 15 November 1968
- Commissioned: 15 November 1968
- Decommissioned: 1989
- Stricken: 1989
- Fate: Scrapped, 1989

General characteristics
- Class & type: Fletcher-class destroyer; Chungmu-class destroyer
- Displacement: 2,050 tons
- Length: 376 ft 6 in (114.76 m)
- Beam: 39 ft 8 in (12.09 m)
- Draft: 17 ft 9 in (5.41 m)
- Propulsion: 60,000 shp (45 MW); geared turbines; 2 propellers
- Speed: 38 knots (70 km/h; 44 mph)
- Range: 6,500 nautical miles (12,000 km; 7,500 mi) at 15 knots (28 km/h; 17 mph)
- Complement: 329 officers and enlisted
- Armament: 5 × 5 in (127 mm) DP guns, 10 × 40 mm AA guns, 7 × 20 mm AA guns, 10 × 21 in (53 cm) torpedo tubes, 6 × depth charge projectors, 2 × depth charge tracks

USS Hickox (DD-673) was a Fletcher-class destroyer of the United States Navy, named for Lieutenant Commander Ralph Hickox (1903–1942).

Hickox was launched 4 July 1943 by Federal Shipbuilding and Drydock Company, Kearny, N.J.; sponsored by Mrs. Ralph Hickox, wife of the late Commander Hickox; and commissioned 10 September 1943.

== Namesake ==
Ralph Hickox was born in Washington, D.C. on 29 August 1903. Enlisting in the United States Marine Corps on 23 September 1921, he was appointed to the United States Naval Academy on 18 July 1923 and commissioned Ensign on 2 June 1927. Hickox served in a variety of ships and stations and was finally appointed commanding officer of the destroyer USS Truxtun on 3 October 1941. He had been commissioned Lieutenant Commander on 1 July, of that year.

Truxtun went aground in heavy seas off St. Lawrence, Newfoundland in Placentia Bay on 18 February 1942, Hickox remained on the bridge directing rescue operations and was instrumental in effecting the rescue of many of the members of his crew. However, Hickox was swept from the bridge by the pounding seas and lost.

== World War II ==
After shakedown in the Caribbean, Hickox departed Norfolk, Virginia 21 November and reported to Pearl Harbor 12 December. Joining Admiral Marc Mitscher's Fast Carrier Task Force (then U.S. Fifth Fleet's TF 58, later U.S. Third Fleet's TF 38) as part of the destroyer screen, Hickox sailed 16 January 1944 to participate in the first "neutralization" raids against Marshall Islands airfields. In the next few months she helped shepherd the powerful aircraft carriers through raids on Truk, the Marshalls, and New Guinea. On 1 April Hickox teamed up with the destroyer Hunt to destroy two small Japanese cargo vessels off Woleai Island. She chalked up another enemy ship, a small picket boat, 13 June in the Marianas. After guarding the carriers as their planes launched initial strikes on both Wake Island and Saipan in early June, Hickox accompanied other units of the task force in patrolling western Marianas waters in anticipation of engagement with a large enemy surface force. These anticipations were met 19 June as the Battle of the Philippine Sea was joined. In this 2-day air struggle, the Japanese fleet lost 395 (92%) of its carrier planes, 31 (72%) of its float planes, and an estimated 50 land-based planes. During the famed "Marianas Turkey Shoot", as the Navy fondly termed it, Hickox was in on the kill of at least five aircraft and also rescued three splashed fliers. Japanese naval air never recovered from this defeat.

For the rest of the summer she remained with TF 58 as the carriers launched preliminary air strikes against enemy positions on Iwo Jima and Guam. On 11 September Hickox joined Admiral William F. Halsey's Third Fleet in Philippine waters to protect carriers whose planes two days later launched initial strikes against the former American islands. After raids on Okinawa and Formosa 12–13 October, Hickox turned back to Philippine waters to participate in the Battle for Leyte Gulf, Japan's last desperate effort to resist the overwhelming American advance across the Pacific. In four separate battles 24–26 October the once-proud Japanese fleet was devastated by the loss of three battleships, 10 cruisers, 4 carriers, 9 destroyers, and a submarine. Through 7 November Hickox remained with the Third Fleet, under almost constant Japanese air attack, to screen air strikes against Manila before retiring to Ulithi.

Rejoining the carriers 14 November, Hickox escorted them to further strikes in the Philippines and 11 December support of the Mindanao landings. In the savage typhoon which struck the Philippines 17 December, Hickox lost steering control in howling winds estimated at 115 knots (213 km/h; 132 mph), but regained power and control in time to shepherd a group of tankers to safety at Ulithi 23 December. Rejoining Task Force 58 1 February 1945, Hickox screened the carriers 16 February as they launched the first raids against Tokyo since the famed Halsey-Doolittle raid of April 1942. Further strikes against the Japanese home islands and in support of the already-launched Iwo Jima invasion kept Hickox at sea well into the spring. On 19 March the carrier Franklin was severely damaged by a a dive bomber and Hickox lowered her whaleboat and steamed in the listing ship's wake to rescue her crew. After rescuing some 70 men from the water, the daring destroyer sailed directly under the flaming carrier's fantail to rescue 18 men from the ship and 3 more from the water. In addition, Hickox's effective antiaircraft fire drove off two more kamikaze attacks on the damaged Franklin. After escorting the carrier to Ulithi 24 March, Hickox sailed 5 April to join support forces off Okinawa, where battle had been raging four days as American forces sought to take the Japanese bastion, last obstacle before invasion of the home islands.

Off Okinawa Hickox engaged in screening and radar picket duties. While coming under fierce air attack, the battle-hardened DD gave as good as she received, downing and assisting in the kill of several Japanese planes. Detached from duty there 29 May, Hickox proceeded to Guam and from there sailed for home via San Pedro and Pearl Harbor. Steaming under the Golden Gate Bridge 6 July, the veteran warrior underwent repairs, her first since departing the States 18 months earlier, and was still there when the long Pacific war ended 2 September with the signing of the armistice in Tokyo Bay. Hickox decommissioned and went into reserve at San Diego 10 December 1946.

== 1951–1957 ==
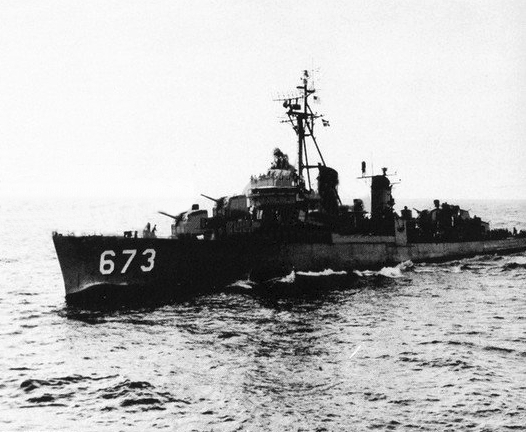
Hickox underway in 1956

Hickox recommissioned 19 May 1951, following the outbreak of the Korea War that accelerated the need for seapower. She arrived Newport, Rhode Island, her new home port, 13 October to join the Atlantic Fleet. After tactical exercises along the coast and in the Caribbean, she and the other destroyers of Destroyer Squadron 20 (DesRon 20) sailed 6 September on what was to become an around-the-world cruise. Hickox spent two winter months on duty off Korea screening the fast carriers of Task Force 77, furnishing gunfire support, and patrolling along the peninsula. She and her sister ships returned to Newport in April 1953 via Singapore, Calcutta, Ceylon, Naples, and Gibraltar to terminate their 7½-month cruise. Further exercises occupied her until 8 September 1954, when Hickox sailed for a 5-month cruise to Northern and Mediterranean Europe. NATO and fleet maneuvers as well as good-will visits consumed most of Hickox's tour, see inset pics. Returning to the States 7 February 1955, Hickox made one more Mediterranean cruise in the summer of 1957 during which she stood by in the eastern Mediterranean to prevent further unrest and bloodshed in the wake of an attempted coup against King Hussein of Jordan. Returning to the States 30 August, Hickox sailed to Philadelphia, Pennsylvania two weeks later and decommissioned there to join the Atlantic Reserve Fleet 20 December 1957.

== ROKS Busan ==
Hickox was transferred to South Korea 15 November 1968, where she served in the Republic of Korea Navy as ROKS Busan, named after the city of Busan.

Busan was stricken and broken up for scrap in 1989

== Awards ==
Hickox received nine battle stars for World War II service and two for Korean War service.
