= USS Hunt (DD-674) =

Fletcher-class destroyer

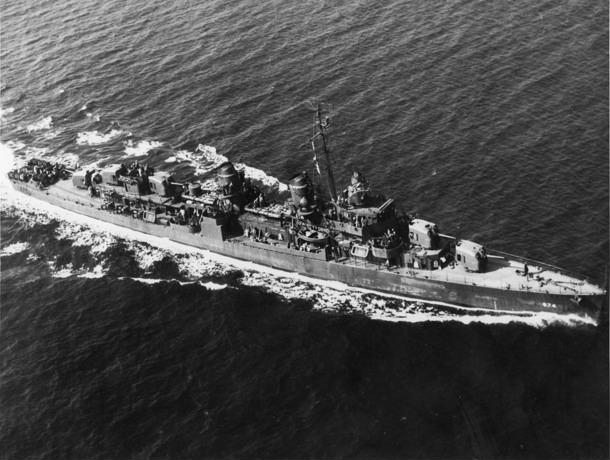
- USS Hunt (DD-674), circa 1943

History

United States
- Namesake: William H. Hunt
- Builder: Federal Shipbuilding & Drydock Co., Kearny, N.J.
- Laid down: 31 March 1943
- Launched: 1 August 1943
- Commissioned: 22 September 1943 to 15 December 1945; 31 October 1951 to 30 December 1963
- Stricken: 1 December 1974
- Fate: Sold for scrap 14 August 1975

General characteristics
- Class & type: Fletcher-class destroyer
- Displacement: 2,924 tons (full)
- Length: 376 ft 5 in (114.7 m)
- Beam: 39 ft 7 in (12.1 m)
- Draft: 13 ft 9 in (4.2 m)
- Propulsion: 60,000 shp (45 MW); geared turbines; 2 propellers
- Speed: 38 knots (70 km/h; 44 mph)
- Range: 6,500 nautical miles at 15 kt; (12,000 km at 30 km/h)
- Complement: 273 officers and crew
- Armament: 5 × 5 in (130 mm)/38 guns, 4 × 40 mm AA guns, 4 × 20 mm AA guns, 10 × 21 inch (533 mm) torpedo tubes, 6 × depth charge projectors, 2 × depth charge tracks

USS Hunt (DD-674) was a Fletcher-class destroyer of the United States Navy, the second Navy ship named for William H. Hunt, Secretary of the Navy under President James A. Garfield.

Hunt was launched by the Federal Shipbuilding & Drydock Co., Kearny, N.J., 1 August 1943; sponsored by Mrs. Henry Kent Hewitt, wife of Vice Admiral Hewitt, and granddaughter of the namesake; and commissioned 22 September 1943.

== World War II ==
After shakedown off Bermuda and final alterations in New York Navy Yard, Hunt cleared Norfolk, Va. for the Pacific 2 December 1943. She entered Pearl Harbor 24 December 1943 and joined Vice Adm. Marc A. Mitscher's Fast Carrier Task Force (then 5th Fleet's TF 58, later 3rd Fleet's TF 38) operating as a part of the antisubmarine screen for a task group which included aircraft carriers Essex (CV-9), Intrepid (CV-11), and Cabot (CVL-28).

=== 1944 ===
Hunt sortied with the carrier task force 16 January 1944 to support the invasion of the Marshall Islands, the operation which, in the words of Rear Adm. Richard L. Conolly, "... really cracked the Japanese shell. It broke the crust of their defenses on a scale that could be exploited at once." At dawn 29 January, Mitscher's planes opened the operation with strikes against enemy-held airfields on Roi Island, Kwajalein Atoll, while Hunt protected the carriers from which they were launched. The next day she joined battleships North Carolina (BB-55), South Dakota (BB-57) and Alabama (BB-60) in shelling pillboxes and other targets on the northern beaches of Roi and Namur Islands. After 2 days on bombardment station she rejoined the screen of the carriers who were furnishing planes to support landing operations on the small islands adjoining Roi and Namur. She entered newly won Majuro Lagoon in company with Essex 5 February 1944 for replenishment.

On 12 February Hunt sailed with most of the Fast Carrier Force to neutralize Truk Atoll, that reputedly impregnable enemy air and naval base which threatened both General Douglas MacArthur's forces then encircling Rabaul and Rear Adm. Harry W. Hill's amphibious vessels preparing to assault Eniwetok. In the early morning darkness of 17 February, Hunt arrived off Truk with the rest of the force which began the systematic destruction of the Japanese ships and planes caught in the area. A group of heavies—two battleships, two heavy cruisers, and four destroyers—circled the atoll to catch enemy ships attempting to escape, while carrier-based planes attacked targets on the islands and in the Lagoon. Hunt's role in the operation was to protect Admiral Albert E. Montgomery's carrier group from submarine or air attack. When her task force steamed away the following evening, its planes and ships had sunk two light cruisers, 4 destroyers, 3 auxiliary cruisers, 6 auxiliaries of different types, and 137,091 tons of merchant shipping. Moreover, the destruction and damaging of between 250 and 275 enemy planes was especially gratifying to the Navy which, by this successful raid, had forced the Japanese Combined Fleet to shun Truk, its base since July 1942, in favor of safer areas closer to home.

After clearing Truk, Hunt, in company with carrier Enterprise (CV-6), cruiser San Diego (CL-53), and five other destroyers, left the main body of the task force to raid "leapfrogged" Jaluit Atoll, Marshall Islands, 20 February 1944. The next day she anchored in Majuro Lagoon from which, after a brief visit to Pearl Harbor, she put to sea as a part of the screen of the Bunker Hill carrier task group (TG 58.2) bound for the Palau Islands 22 March. She steamed on station as the first air strikes at Peleliu were launched 30 March. Intense and accurate antiaircraft fire from Hunt and her sister ships drove off three flight groups of Japanese torpedo bombers as strikes continued during the next 3 days. On 1 April she left the formation with destroyer Hickox (DD-673) to destroy two 125-foot patrol craft which had been firing on American planes.

She returned to Majuro on 6 April for replenishment, then set course with the Bunker Hill carrier task group to lend support to the invasion and occupation of Hollandia, D.N.G. Planes from the carriers repeatedly struck enemy emplacements in the area, and night fighters successfully repelled all enemy planes which approached the warships. On the passage returning to Majuro Hunt's carriers paused off Truk 29 and 30 April for another raid on that weakened but reinforced enemy base. Thereafter Truk was almost useless to the Japanese.

May was a welcome interlude devoted to training exercises in the Marshalls enlivened by a diversionary raid on Wake Island 24 May to draw attention away from the Marianas. Hunt put to sea with the Bunker Hill carrier task group 6 June for the invasion of the Marianas. The first air strikes of the operation against the Island Group were launched on 11 June and continued until 15 June when the marines hit the beaches, and attention shifted to providing close support for troops ashore. On that day, Admiral Raymond A. Spruance receivedj a warning from submarine Flying Fish (SS-229) that an enemy carrier force was approaching from San Bernardino Strait. In the early hours of 19 June it arrived within striking distance of the fast carrier force which guarded the amphibious forces off Saipan. The Battle of the Philippine Sea began in a series of dog fights over Guam, where American planes were neutralizing Japanese land-based air forces. About an hour and a half later, the major phase of the battle, nicknamed "The Marianas Turkey Shoot", opened when the American flattops launched their fighters to intercept the first of four raids from the Japanese carriers. During the ensuing 8 hours of fierce, continuous fighting in the air, Japan lost 346 planes and 2 carriers while only 30 U.S. planes splashed and 1 American battleship suffered a bomb hit but was not put out of action. Hunt then steamed westward with the carriers in pursuit of the fleeing remnants of the enemy fleet. The following afternoon planes from the carriers caught up with their quarry and accounted for carrier Hiyō and two oilers while damaging several other Japanese ships. This carrier battle, the greatest of the war, virtually wiped out the emperor's naval air power which would be sorely missed in the impending battle for Leyte Gulf.

The next evening the task force gave up the chase and set course for Saipan. On the return passage, Hunt rescued four pilots and seven crewmen from planes which had been unable to land on their carriers. Once back in the Marianas, Hunt and her sister ships resumed the task of supporting the American forces which were taking Saipan, Tinian, and Guam. They continued this duty until fighting in these islands ended early in August.

After voyage repairs at Pearl Harbor, she departed 30 August as part of the screen for Admiral William F. Halsey's flagship, New Jersey (BB-62). Hunt joined the Bunker Hill Carrier Group off the Admiralty Islands 6 September for operations south of the Palau Islands. On 11 September she carried Admiral Halsey from New Jersey to carrier Lexington (CV-16) for a conference and returned him to his flagship. In the following days she guarded the carriers which were repeatedly raiding the Palaus to soften them up for the invasion. When marines landed on Peleliu 15 September, planes from these carriers supported the efforts on shore until the determined leathernecks finally stamped out the last organized resistance of the dogged Japanese defenders. Hunt entered Kossol Passage 30 September to embark Admiral Halsey and his staff for passage to Peleliu. Hunt put him ashore that afternoon and steamed off shore as stand-by flagship until the following afternoon when he again came on board to be returned to Kossol Passage.

On 6 October, she cleared port with the Bunker Hill carrier task group for air strikes against Okinawa Jima. Hunt rescued a pilot and two crewmen of a splashed Bunker Hill plane 10 October. She repeated this fjeat 2 days later when she saved a pilot and two crewmen whose plane had been downed during an attack on Formosan airbases.

Hunt accompanied the carriers off Northern Luzon during the landings on Leyte 20 October while they struck again and again at Japanese airfields throughout the Philippines to eliminate enemy airpower during General MacArthur's long-awaited return. During the decisive Battle for Leyte Gulf they went after the Japanese northern force and sank four carriers and a destroyer besides damaging several other ships.

=== 1945 ===
1945 crew photo.

For the rest of the year, Hunt continued to serve as a screening unit for the carrier strikes against Formosa and Japanese-held areas in the Philippines. On 16 February 1945, her fast carrier task force hit hard at the Tokyo Bay area in a furious 2-day attack. Then the flattops turned their attention to support the landings on Iwo Jima which began 19 February. That day her guns brought down an enemy plane as they repelled the first of the air raids against American ships off that bitterly contested island. Hunt sailed from Iwo Jima 22 February for waters off Honshū, Japan and another swipe at Tokyo Bay, 25 February. On the way to Ulithi the carriers paused to strike Okinawa 1 March.

Hunt departed Ulithi 14 March for rendezvous with carrier FrankIin (CV-13) off the Ryukyu Islands 18 March. The next day Franklin maneuvered closer to the Japanese mainland than had any other U.S. carrier up to that point in the war to launch a fighter sweep against Honshū and later a strike against shipping in Kobe Harbor. Suddenly a single enemy plane broke through the cloud cover and made a low level run to drop two semi-armor-piercing bombs on the gallant ship. The carrier burned furiously as the flames triggered ammunition, bombs, and rockets. Hunt closed the stricken ship to assist in picking up survivors blown overboard by the explosions. After rescuing 429 survivors, she joined three other destroyers in a clockwise patrol around the stricken ship which had gone dead in the water within 50 miles of the Japanese Coast. Cruiser Pittsburgh (CA-72) took the ship in tow and, after an epic struggle, managed to get her to Ulithi 24 March. Hunt put the survivors ashore and sped to the Ryukyus 5 April to support troops who were struggling to take Okinawa.

Hunt took up radar picket station off Okinawa 8 April. On 14 April a kamikaze roared in toward Hunt and was riddled by her guns during the approach. It struck the destroyer at deck level shearing off the mainmast and slicing into the forward stack, where it left its starboard wing. The fuselage of the suicide plane splashed into the water about 25 yards from Hunt whose crew quickly doused the small fires which had broken out on board. A second kamikaze which approached Hunt that day was knocked down by her alert gunners before it could reach the ship.

Hunt continued to guard the carriers as they gave direct support to troops on Okinawa, taking time out on 4 separate days for radar picket duty in dangerous waters. When she departed Ryukyus 30 May for tender overhaul in Leyte Gulf, her crew had been to general quarters 54 times.

Hunt sailed for the United States 19 June 1945, arrived in San Francisco, Calif. for overhaul 6 July, and decommissioned 15 December 1945 at San Diego, Calif.

== 1951 – 1963 ==
Hunt recommissioned at San Diego 31 October 1951. After refresher training in local areas, she departed 14 February for Newport, R.I. where she arrived 3 March 1952. She cruised from that port for the next 2 1/2 years conducting antisubmarine and plane guard duty. She departed Newport 1 June 1954 for Yokosuka, Japan where she arrived 7 July and was underway again 16 July for task force maneuvers off the Philippine Islands. On 21 October she cleared Sasebo, Japan, on the second leg of a world cruise which took her to Hong Kong, Singapore, the Suez Canal, and Naples which she reached 20 November 1954. She passed through the Strait of Gibraltar 12 December 1954 and arrived back in Newport 18 December.

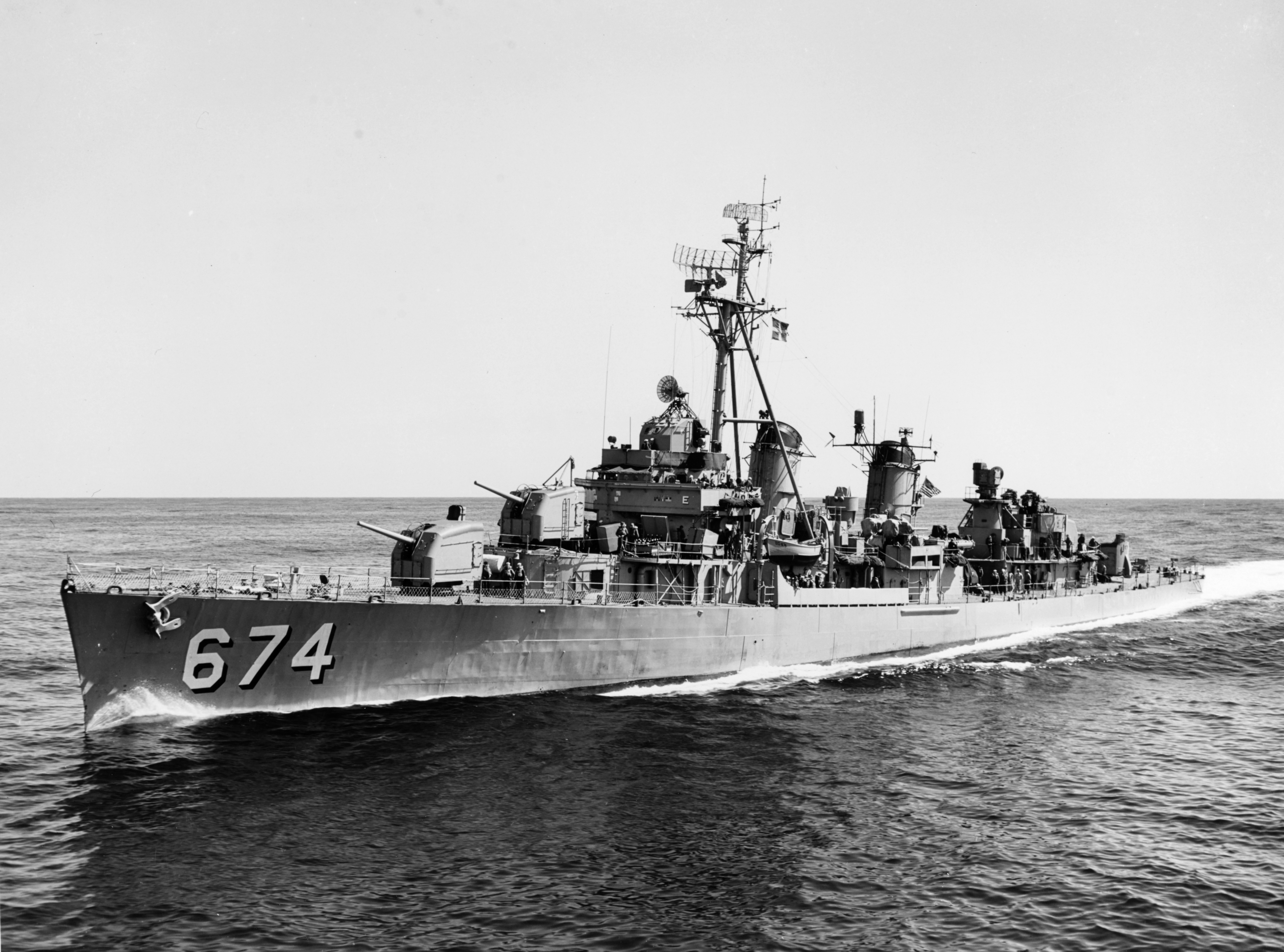
USS Hunt (DD-674) during 1959.

The next 2 years were filled with intensive antisubmarine warfare and convoy exercises. Hunt departed Newport 6 November for patrol in the Eastern Mediterranean during the Suez Crisis and the Hungarian Revolution. She returned to Newport 27 February 1957 where more antisubmarine warfare and convoy exercises awaited. She embarked midshipmen at Annapolis for a training cruise which included the International Naval Review in Hampton Roads on 12 June, and a visit to Rio de Janeiro, Brazil; future United States Senator and presidential candidate John McCain was one of the midshipmen on this cruise. She departed Newport for Belfast, Northern Ireland 3 September to participate in Operation "Seaspray", maneuvers with the combined forces of NATO. From 22 October 1957 through 1 August 1958 Hunt operated out of Newport. On the latter date while on a cruise to the Caribbean she sped from San Juan, Puerto Rico to join attack carrier Saratoga (CVA-60) in the Mediterranean to augment the 6th Fleet during the Near Eastern crisis which had necessitated the landing of marines in Beirut, Lebanon to check aggression. She reached that port 28 August and 3 days later was underway for the Red Sea. She completed transit of the Suez Canal 11 September for Massawa, Ethiopia, and after calling at Aden, Arabia, set course 14 October for the Mediterranean and maneuvers with the 6th Fleet en route home to Newport, arriving 13 November.

Hunt operated out of Newport with occasional cruises in the Caribbean conducting exercises in antisubmarine warfare and battle practice. She won the Battle Efficiency Award for the fiscal year 1957 to 1958 and repeated the feat for the 1958 to 1959 period. She decommissioned 30 December 1963 and was berthed in the Atlantic Reserve Fleet at Philadelphia, Pa.

Hunt was stricken from the Naval Vessel Register 1 December 1974. She was sold 14 August 1975 and broken up for scrap.

== Awards ==
- American Campaign Medal
- Asiatic-Pacific Campaign Medal
- World War II Victory Medal
- China Service Medal
- National Defense Service Medal with star
- Korean Service Medal
- United Nations Korea Medal
- Philippine Liberation Medal
