= USS Wallace L. Lind =

Allen M. Sumner-class destroyer

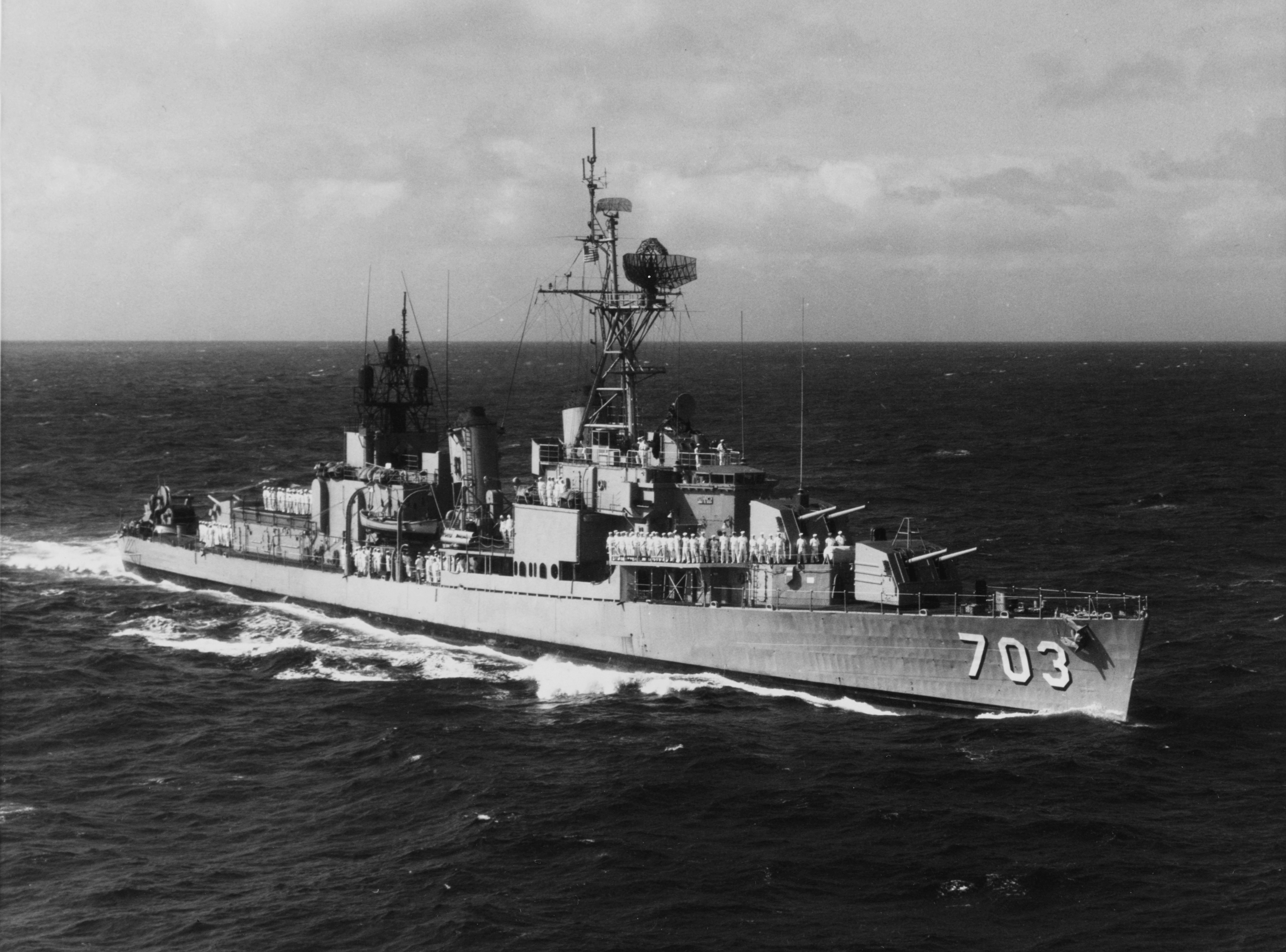
- USS Wallace L. Lind underway in April 1970

History

United States
- Name: Wallace L. Lind
- Namesake: Wallace Ludwig Lind
- Builder: Federal Shipbuilding and Drydock Company
- Laid down: 14 February 1944
- Launched: 14 June 1944
- Sponsored by: Mrs. Wallace L. Lind
- Commissioned: 8 September 1944
- Decommissioned: 4 December 1973
- Stricken: 4 December 1973
- Identification: Callsign: NTWT; Hull number: DD-703
- Honours and awards: See Awards
- Fate: Transferred to South Korea, 4 December 1973
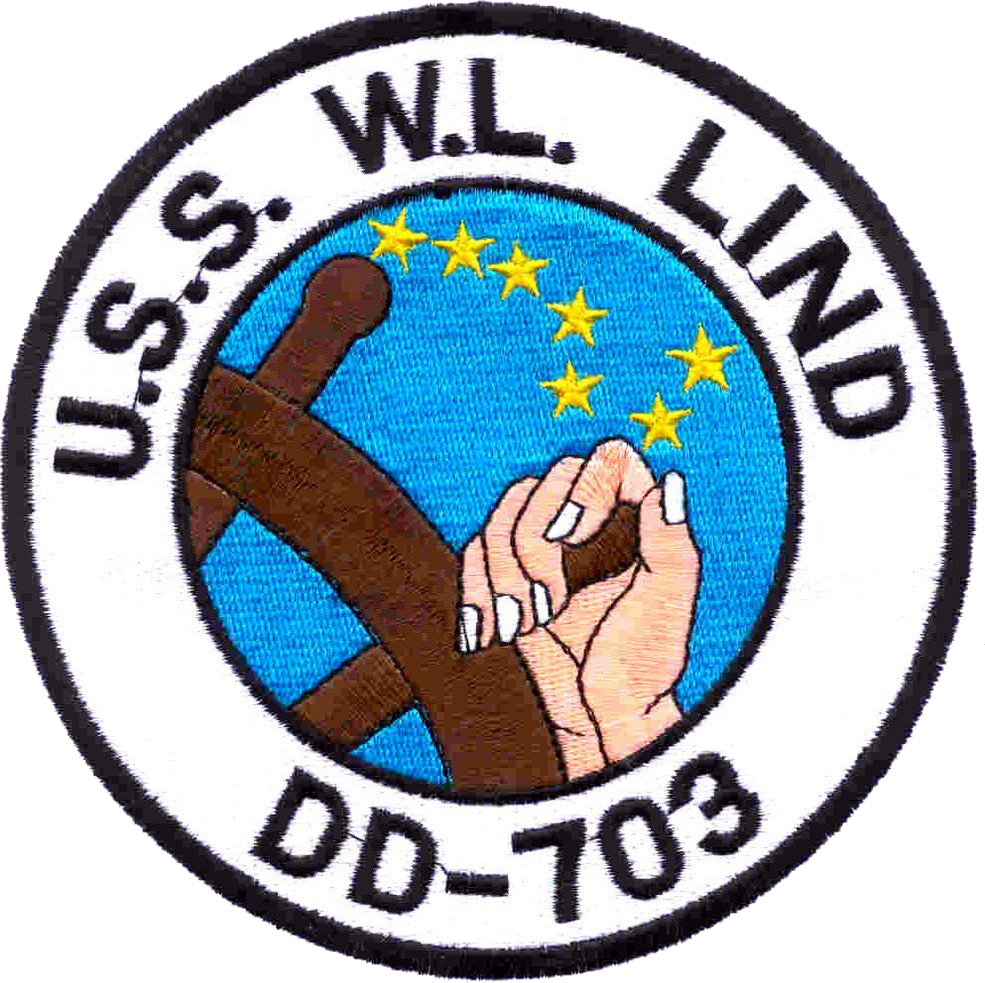
- Badge

South Korea
- Name: Daegu; (대구)
- Namesake: Daegu
- Acquired: 4 December 1973
- Stricken: 1994
- Identification: Hull number: DD-917
- Fate: Scrapped, 1994

General characteristics
- Class & type: Allen M. Sumner-class destroyer; Daegu-class destroyer
- Displacement: 2,200 tons
- Length: 376 ft 6 in (114.76 m)
- Beam: 40 ft (12 m)
- Draft: 15 ft 8 in (4.78 m)
- Propulsion: 60,000 shp (45,000 kW); 2 propellers
- Speed: 34 kn (63 km/h; 39 mph)
- Range: 6,500 nmi (12,000 km; 7,500 mi) at 15 kn (28 km/h; 17 mph)
- Complement: 336
- Armament: 6 × 5 in (130 mm)/38 cal. guns; 12 × 40 mm AA guns, 11 × 20 mm AA guns, 10 × 21 inch (533 mm) torpedo tubes, 6 × depth charge projectors, 2 × depth charge tracks

USS Wallace L. Lind (DD-703), was an Allen M. Sumner-class destroyer of the United States Navy.

== Namesake ==
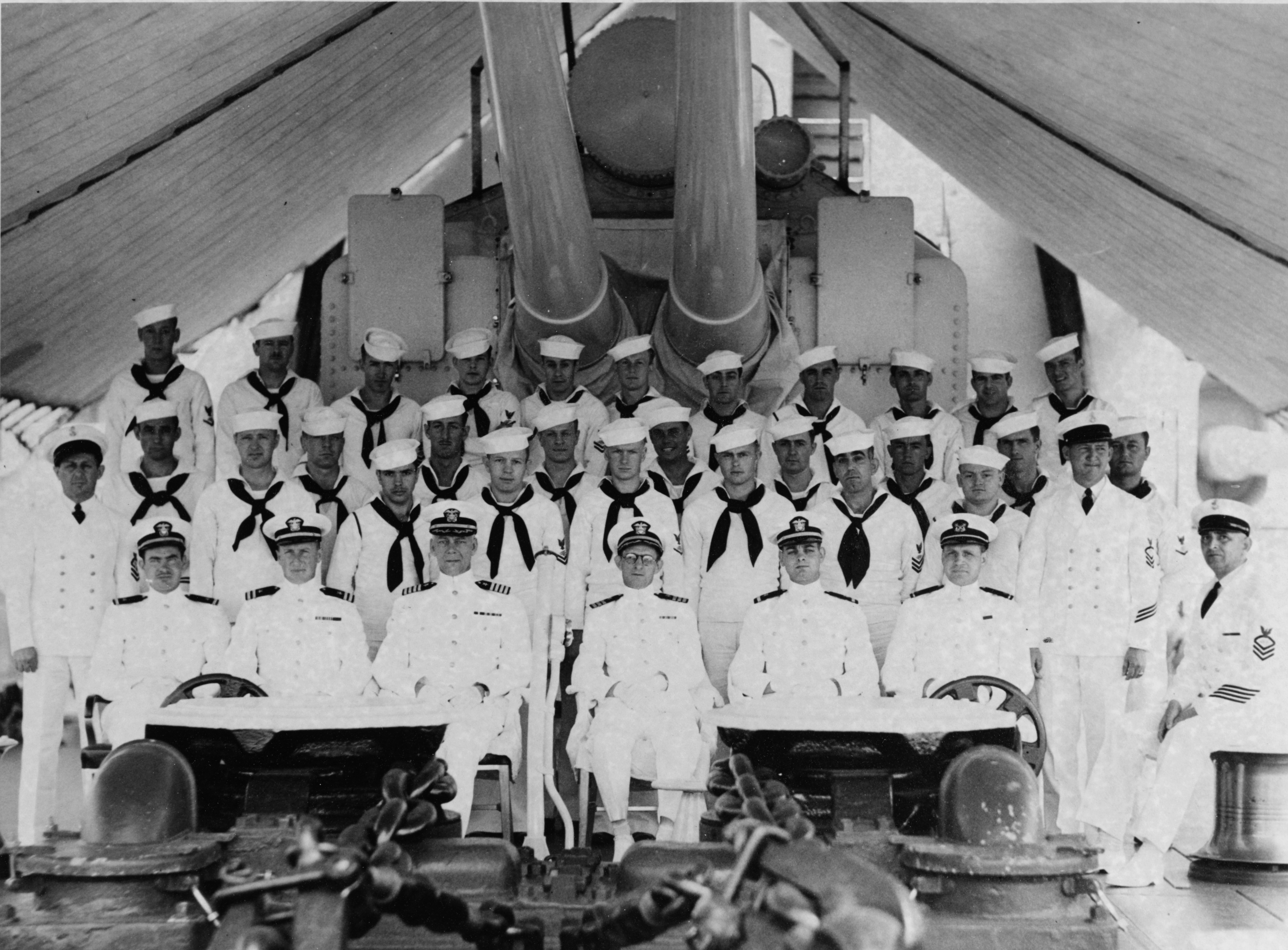
W.L. Lind (3rd from left) as commanding officer of USS Omaha, 1938–1939.

Wallace Ludwig Lind was born on 18 June 1887 in Brainerd, Minnesota. He was appointed a midshipman on 30 June 1905 and commissioned an Ensign on 5 June 1911. He served on USS Stewart, USS Denver, USS Goldsborough and USS Cheyenne. On 31 August 1915, he departed Cheyenne and, one month later, arrived at the United States Naval Academy, Annapolis, Maryland, for a post-graduate course in steam engineering, following which he attended Columbia University for special instruction. He served on board USS Rhode Island from 2 March to 12 July 1917 and was then detailed to New York, for duty on board the troop transport USS President Lincoln as engineering officer and, later, as executive officer. It was during this assignment that he was awarded the Navy Cross for heroism. On 4 May 1920, he reported to USS Michigan as first lieutenant followed by a tour as first lieutenant on USS Arizona.

He assumed command of USS Capella on 5 June 1922 and, upon being detached from that ship, reported to the Naval Air Station San Diego, California on 18 April 1923 for duty as executive officer. Upon the completion of his duties there, he served as engineering officer of Arizona. This was followed by instruction at the Naval Unit, Edgewood Arsenal, Edgewood, Maryland, and at the Naval War College, Newport, Rhode Island. Into the 1930s, he served as executive officer of USS Medusa, USS Altair and USS Omaha; followed by shore duty at the Boston Navy Yard. From 1935 to 1938, Commander Lind was assigned to the Office of the Chief of Naval Operations, Navy Department, Washington, D.C. During this period, he received his promotion to Captain to rank from 30 June 1937. He died on 12 April 1940 at Baltimore, Maryland.

== Construction and commissioning ==
Wallace L. Lind was laid down on 14 February 1944 by the Federal Shipbuilding and Dry Dock Company in Kearny, New Jersey and launched on 14 June 1944; sponsored by Mrs. Wallace L. Lind, widow of Captain Lind. The ship was commissioned at the New York Navy Yard on 8 September 1944.

== Service history ==
Shakedown, which took Wallace L. Lind from the New York Navy Yard to Bermuda and back, extended through 2 November 1944. Departing Virginia en route to the Pacific on 14 November, she transited the Panama Canal on 27 November and arrived at Pearl Harbor on 13 December and underwent upkeep and training exercises. Wallace L. Lind and Tracy took leave of Hawaii on 23 December, escorting the aircraft carrier Enterprise to Ulithi. Tracy left the formation and proceeded to Eniwetok, and she was replaced by Frazier.

On 5 January 1945, the destroyer made rendezvous with the Fast Carrier Task Force (then Task Force 38) under Admiral William F. Halsey, Commander, 3rd Fleet. Air strikes against Luzon began on 6 January 1945 and were followed by strikes against Formosa, Saigon, the Pescadore Islands, and Hong Kong. Photo reconnaissance planes surveyed Okinawa Gunto in preparation for the upcoming invasion. On 23 January, Wallace L. Lind left the area north of Luzon and arrived at Ulithi three days later for upkeep.

The destroyer reported for duty with Task Force 58, a fast carrier task force, on 11 February 1945. On 16 February, carrier planes conducted raids in the Tokyo area and, the following afternoon, retired toward Iwo Jima, with the carrier planes conducting air searches en route.

On 19 February 1945, the carriers launched aircraft as cover for the initial landing of troops on Iwo Jima. These operations continued through 25 February when strikes again commenced against Tokyo. During the above actions, Wallace L. Lind was assigned to screen the carriers and to assist in mail deliveries and transfer of personnel.

Wallace L. Lind's destroyer group departed the Honshū area on 27 February and set course for Okinawa, arriving four days later. On 1 March, the vessel acted as a plane guard for strikes against Okinawa and Minami Daito. Upon recovery of the strike planes, the task group set course for Ulithi, Caroline Islands.

After a period of routine upkeep, drydock, and availability, Wallace L. Lind set course for Kyūshū, where the first air strikes were launched on 18 March. Numerous enemy aircraft appeared sporadically throughout this first day. The second day saw strikes and sweeps against Kyūshū targets, as well as a special sweep on Kii Suido. Two Japanese planes closed the formation, and the destroyer opened fire. Both planes were destroyed by gunfire.

Wallace L. Lind departed the area on 19 March. The destroyer temporarily joined a unit which proceeded to execute shore bombardment against Minami Daito on 28 March. The following day, strikes were launched against airfields on Kyūshū. She exploded two floating mines and fired on an enemy torpedo plane which crashed shortly afterward. While commencing a southerly retirement, Lind executed a strike against Amami Gunto en route.

On 30 and 31 March 1945, strikes and sweeps over Okinawa Gunto provided cover for landing operations. The operations in that area continued, with intermittent strikes against Amami Gunto and refueling and rearming operations, throughout April. During the month of April, Wallace L. Lind destroyed two enemy planes and made three assists.

The month of May was spent participating in strikes against Okinawa Gunto, Kyūshū, and the Amami O'Shima-Kikai Jima area. Wallace L. Lind performed various duties ranging from screening the carriers to recovering downed pilots. During these operations, Japanese kamikaze planes dove on TF 58, hitting both Enterprise and Bunker Hill. The destroyer participated in one shore bombardment, sank three mines, shot down three Japanese planes, and had two assists.

This marked the end of a period of continuous steaming from 14 March 1945 when Wallace L. Lind started from Ulithi with TF 58 in support of the Okinawa occupation. On 1 June, Lind arrived at San Pedro Bay, Philippines, and went alongside the destroyer tender Dixie for availability through 12 June. The remainder of June was spent in various training exercises and getting the ship ready for sea.

On 1 July 1945, Wallace L. Lind, in company with ships of Destroyer Squadron 62 (DesRon 62), got underway from San Pedro Bay in advance of the heavy ships of Task Group 38.3 (TG 38.3) to provide an anti-submarine screen for their sortie. Nine days later, the vessel arrived at the area off the east coast of Honshū, Japan, and the task group launched strikes against the Tokyo plains area. Wallace L. Lind assumed duty as a picket station, then acted as a communication link between task groups. On 14 July 1945, she joined the carrier strikes on the east coast of Honshū and the northern Honshū-Hokkaidō target area.

On the night of 18 July 1945, Wallace L. Lind joined Destroyer Squadron 62 and Cruiser Division 18 for an antishipping sweep across the entrance to Tokyo Bay. At 22:30, she and the destroyer USS Hank (DD-702) mistakenly opened gunfire on the U.S. Navy submarine USS Gabilan (SS-252) at a range of 12,800 yards (12,000 m) while Gabilan was on the surface in the Pacific Ocean off the Bōsō Peninsula, Honshu, Japan, at 35°05′N 140°50′E. Gabilan had difficulty diving in heavy seas and broached, and the destroyers' gunfire straddled her an estimated ten times before she finally submerged and broke contact.

After refueling east of the Bonin Islands, Wallace L. Lind returned to the operating area of the east coast of Kyūshū on 24 July. She was then in position to act as a picket in the "Able Day" strikes against the Kure area. On 30 July, the task group launched strikes at air installations in the Tokyo-Nagoya area. The next day, the ships retired on a southerly course for replenishment. On 8 August, planes hit northern Honshū and Hokkaido as well as the Tokyo plains area. Wallace L. Lind received official word that the war with Japan had ceased on 15 August 1945. The task group moved to the southeast of Tokyo with all ships taking precautions against attacking enemy aircraft which persisted, in some cases, despite the war's end.

=== Post-World War II ===
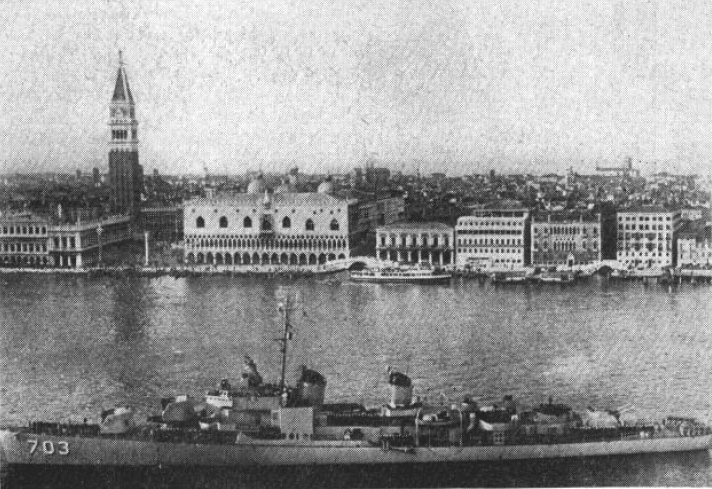
Wallace L. Lind at Venice in late 1949.

On 1 September, the destroyer went alongside the carrier Shangri-La and took on board Vice Admiral John H. Towers and staff, and then transported them to Tokyo Bay for the surrender ceremonies. Vice Admiral Towers shifted his flag from Shangri-La to Wallace L. Lind, and upon completion of the ceremonies the following day, returned to Shangri-La.

The destroyer took part in maintaining air patrols and searches over northern Japan in connection with the occupation; then, on 21 September, set course for Eniwetok. She underwent availability through 6 October and spent the remainder of the month in upkeep and training exercises in Tokyo Bay.

Wallace L. Lind and John W. Weeks departed Tokyo Bay on 31 October for Sasebo, Japan, where she spent the final months of 1945 operating between Sasebo and Okinawa. On 5 January 1946, the destroyer stopped briefly at Eniwetok before commencing her homeward journey. She arrived at her home port of Norfolk, Virginia, on 19 February 1946, after stopping at Pearl Harbor and San Francisco and transiting the Panama Canal.

From 9 March through 26 April, Wallace L. Lind underwent tender availability, a leave period, and training at Casco Bay in Maine. She then travelled to Charleston, South Carolina, where she underwent restricted availability and operated with John W. Weeks until 12 July when her home port was changed to New Orleans. Wallace L. Lind then commenced Naval Reserve training cruises in the Caribbean. This type of operations characterized her activity for the next several years.

On 7 January 1949, the destroyer returned to Norfolk, Virginia, and conducted operations out of that port until 6 September. The next day, she made rendezvous with TF 89 and commenced a Mediterranean cruise which lasted through 26 January 1950 when she returned to Norfolk.

=== Korean War ===
Wallace L. Lind spent the greater part of 1950 engaged in training operations and a cruise to the Caribbean. On 6 September, the destroyer sailed for the Far East and the Korean War. The ship arrived off the coast of Korea on 13 October and centered her movements around Wonsan Harbor, then under siege, with frequent interruptions for blockade patrol and bombardment missions in the vicinity of Songjin and Hungnam.

During the period 17 to 24 December, Wallace L. Lind took part as an active member of what was said by many to be one of the mightiest naval forces ever assembled in short range support of ground forces. This was in the defense of Hungnam and in the support of the eventual evacuation.

Throughout the entire month of January 1951, Wallace L. Lind operated as a member of the East Korea Blockade Group and attended to duties such as naval gunfire support and support of minesweeping operations.

The destroyer spent February conducting special intelligence missions which included shore bombardment, fire support, and screening duties in the area of Kangnung, and placing intelligence teams ashore in the areas of Wonsan, Chaho, and Chongjin. The ship conducted many gunfire support missions against targets spotted by these intelligence teams. On 20 February, Wallace L. Lind, along with Ozbourn and Charles S. Sperry, engaged in the rescue of a pilot who had crash-landed in Wonsan harbor. While the three ships were attempting rescue operations, shore batteries opened fire on them, and Wallace L. Lind successfully returned fire.

On 15 March 1951, a seven-ship naval bombardment of the Wonsan district resulted in reported enemy casualties of some 6,000. The following afternoon, shore batteries fired at the ships in the harbor, and counter-battery fire from the destroyers began in a matter of seconds. Gun positions were taken under fire, and several explosions were noted on the peninsula. On 17 March, Wallace L. Lind patrolled independently from Wonsan south along the coast. The ship took the city of Kosong under fire and exposed and silenced a camouflaged shore battery located south of Suwon Dan lighthouse.

On 7 April 1951, as part of Special Task Force 74, Wallace L. Lind along with the destroyer Massey, destroyer escort Begor, landing ship dock Fort Marion, and heavy cruiser Saint Paul, helped to carry out raids on rail lines and tunnels utilizing 250 commandos of the 41st Independent Royal Marines. These highly successful destructive raids slowed down the enemy's resupply efforts, forcing the Communists to attempt to repair or rebuild the rail facilities by night while hiding the work crews and locomotives in tunnels by day.

=== Post Korea ===
Wallace L. Lind departed the Korean area on 9 May 1951 and arrived at Pearl Harbor 10 days later, having stopped at Yokosuka and Midway en route. She transited the Panama Canal and arrived at Norfolk on 9 June.

After a brief trip to New York, the destroyer departed Norfolk on 26 August 1952 for a Mediterranean deployment. She returned to Norfolk on 4 February 1953 and spent several months in her home port. On 19 November, the destroyer departed for refresher training at Guantanamo, returning on 14 December to spend the holiday season at Norfolk. On 4 January 1954, the ship returned to the Guantanamo area for the remainder of the month. On 31 January 1954, Wallace L. Lind returned to Norfolk, where she remained through 10 May. Commencing 11 May, the destroyer operated off the Middle Atlantic coast and returned to her home port nine days later. On 1 June, she set course for Key West and operated in that area and the Gulf of Honduras until 25 June when she arrived back at Norfolk and remained there until 7 September. At that time, she again made a brief cruise off the Middle Atlantic coast before departing on a transatlantic voyage.

On 22 September, Wallace L. Lind arrived at Lisbon, Portugal. After a stay of five days, the destroyer departed for a brief stop at Bermuda before returning to Norfolk on 8 October. She took part in Operation "Lant-flex 1-55" which ran from 20 to 29 October. On 1 November, the ship returned to Norfolk and remained at her home port through 1 May 1955.

On 2 May 1955, Wallace L. Lind got underway for a cruise to several European countries including England, Scotland, France, Germany, and Portugal as well as Reykjavík, Iceland. While in Germany, the crew had the pleasure of sailing through the Kiel Canal to participate in the International Sailing Regatta. The destroyer returned to Norfolk on 19 August, and remained in port until 10 October when she set course for Philadelphia, Pennsylvania, where she underwent an extensive overhaul which lasted through 12 February 1956.

The destroyer then returned to her home port and spent several weeks before departing for Guantanamo and various training exercises which lasted through 23 March 1956. On 27 March, the ship returned to Norfolk and conducted operations in the Virginia Capes area and as far north as New York City. She arrived back at Norfolk on 21 June and stayed in port for approximately one month.

On 28 July 1956, Wallace L. Lind set course for the Middle East to screen the evacuation of American citizens during hostilities between Egypt and Israel, (see Suez Crisis). She arrived at Port Said and the Suez Canal on 13 August; and, for the next two months, she visited ports in Saudi Arabia, Iran, Iraq, Ethiopia, and Aden before departing the area on 14 September for Naples, Cannes, and Malta. The destroyer arrived at Phaleron Bay, Greece, on 15 October, and remained through 27 October when she departed for home. On 4 December, Wallace L. Lind returned to Norfolk, where she remained until 2 February 1957.

Departing Norfolk, the ship arrived at the operations area outside San Juan, Puerto Rico, on 5 February. She conducted exercises through 11 February when she headed for Kingston, Jamaica, and Guantanamo before arriving back at Norfolk on 7 March 1957. Wallace L. Lind then operated along the east coast before finally departing Norfolk on 25 June for a Middle East deployment. The ship arrived at Norfolk on 20 November and remained there until 4 January 1958.

On 6 January 1958, Lind set out for a month of exercises in the Caribbean. The ship returned to Norfolk on 7 February and, one week later, went into the Norfolk Naval Shipyard for three months of overhaul. On 27 May, the destroyer returned to the naval base, then set course for Guantanamo and underwent refresher training through 18 July.

Upon her return to Norfolk, Wallace L. Lind conducted local operations until 24 October 1958 when she was deployed to the Mediterranean with the 6th Fleet. On 5 November, she reached Barcelona, Spain, then headed for the Middle East, making stops in the areas of the Suez Canal, Red Sea, Gulf of Aden, and the Persian Gulf. On 14 January 1959, the destroyer arrived at Livorno, Italy, and spent the remainder of the cruise operating between Italy and Spain. She made a brief stop at Cannes, France, before starting the trip homeward. Lind arrived at Norfolk on 8 April 1959, and participated in services and type training until July when she entered the Norfolk Naval Shipyard for an interim refitting and docking period. For the remainder of the year, she operated from her home port, making trips to Mayport, Florida, and Narragansett Bay, Rhode Island, acting under the control of COMASWFORLANT for duty with the anti-submarine warfare hunter/killer forces.

=== 1960 ===
Wallace L. Lind operated with these forces through 29 June 1960 when she took on board 27 NROTC midshipmen for their annual training cruise. The destroyer demonstrated her antisubmarine warfare proficiency during this six-week outing which included stops at Halifax, Nova Scotia, and New York City.

Throughout August and September, the destroyer prepared for NATO fall exercises in the North Atlantic. On 6 September, she sailed from Norfolk and spent four weeks operating at sea with NATO forces. It was during this cruise that she crossed the Arctic Circle.

After returning to Norfolk on 20 October, Wallace L. Lind kept occupied with type training and miscellaneous services until December when she rejoined COMASWFORLANT for a brief assignment with the hunter/killer forces.

Wallace L. Lind welcomed in the new year, 1961, while at sea with COMASWFORLANT. On 13 February, she sailed for the Caribbean and Operation "Springboard 61." She returned to Norfolk, conducted local operations, and underwent upkeep commencing on 26 May.

On 1 June 1961, Wallace L. Land's tender availability was interrupted when the destroyer was ordered to proceed, in company with other units of the 2nd Fleet, to the Dominican Republic. After three weeks of carrier task group operations, anti-submarine warfare, and shore bombardment exercises, the international crisis in that area lessened, and the destroyer returned to Norfolk on 20 June.

Wallace L. Lind provided services as a DesLant Gunnery School ship at Newport, Rhode Island, from 23 June until 7 July. While participating in "Lantflex 2-61," the destroyer spent the period between 17 and 27 July with midshipmen from the Naval Academy embarked on their summer cruise.

From 11 August until 22 September 1961, the ship participated in Project Mercury and was assigned to an area just south of the Canary Islands. She returned to Norfolk on 22 September and remained in upkeep status through 1 October.

On 16 October, Wallace L. Lind began a pre-FRAM availability; and, one month later, she underwent Fleet Rehabilitation and Modernization (FRAM) II conversion. This overhaul amounted to a complete renewal of her after superstructure, a new and modern combat information center, and modernization or complete overhaul of almost all machinery, weapons systems, and living accommodations. Changes to weapons systems involved adding to the previously installed Hedgehog mounts two new side torpedo racks amidships for current inventory torpedoes. Immediately aft of the torpedo deck on the 01 level of the new superstructure, a hangar area and flight deck, from which the new Drone Antisubmarine Helicopter (DASH) could operate, was installed. Also installed was a variable depth sonar rig adding coverage for submarine search at various depth levels.

Wallace L. Lind was declared ready for sea on 25 August 1962. On 7 September, she arrived at Guantanamo for refresher training. After successfully completing the final operational readiness inspection on 17 October, the destroyer departed Guantanamo for Culebra Island, thence to Key West. However, while en route to Florida, the Cuban Missile Crisis intervened; and, on 21 October, the ship returned to Guantanamo. When the immediate crisis had ended, Lind returned to Norfolk on 28 November and commenced a needed in-port period of upkeep and preparation for the final outfitting with DASH.

The destroyer followed a two-week visit to Key West as a Fleet Sonar School ship in March 1963 with a trip to NS Argentia, Newfoundland. This voyage north was interrupted by the news of the loss of the nuclear submarine Thresher. Wallace L. Lind, which was in the immediate vicinity at the time, joined in the search.

The destroyer completed the year's competitive exercises in May and was occupied with rocket and missile firings in June. She participated in the development acceptance program incident to Polaris missile firings for the submarine Lafayette off Cape Kennedy. During this period, Wallace L. Lind hosted the Commander in Chief, Atlantic Fleet and Commander, Submarine Force, Atlantic Fleet as observers of the launches. She also hosted the Secretary of Defense, the Secretary of the Navy, and the Chairman of the Joint Chiefs of Staff. Lind became the first operationally qualified DASH destroyer in the Atlantic Fleet during trials in July 1963.

In November 1963, the destroyer joined the operational forces of COMASWFORLANT and participated in an anti-submarine warfare demonstration for the American Helicopter Society in the Narragansett Bay area. During ensuing antisubmarine warfare operations with Task Group Bravo, Wallace L. Lind engaged fast nuclear submarines in hunter/killer operations and proved herself fully ready as a unit of the "HUK Team."

=== 1964 ===
Upon completion of a Christmas leave and upkeep period in January 1964, Wallace L. Lind departed for anti-submarine warfare barrier operations in the Caribbean and participated in Operation "Springboard." In early March, the destroyer acted as the special project ship for the Gemini/Apollo test program. Large cranes were installed on the fantail for recovery of space capsules, and Wallace L. Lind worked with NASA officials successfully recovering mock-up space capsules.

During April and May, Wallace L. Lind joined Task Group Bravo for anti-submarine warfare operations; and in April, she took part in Operation "Quick Kick," a large fleet exercise. Having undergone restricted availability for hull and bottom work at the Newport News Shipbuilding and Drydock Company, the ship spent the month of July in preparation for a forthcoming Mediterranean deployment.

On 3 August 1964, Wallace L. Lind departed for the Mediterranean and served as flagship for Captain Maylon T. Scott, Commander, Destroyer Division 22. She participated in exercises as part of a fast carrier task force and conducted numerous community relations programs in the various ports visited. The destroyer returned to Norfolk three days before Christmas after earning a well-deserved leave and upkeep period.

Wallace L. Lind remained moored at the Naval Destroyer and Submarine Pier, Norfolk, Virginia, until 25 January when she got underway and exercised independently. On 29 January, she moored at the Naval Base, San Juan, Puerto Rico, and conducted local operations in the San Juan operating areas through 8 February. The destroyer arrived at Norfolk on 12 February and remained moored until late March when she got underway for refueling and rearming. She returned to the Norfolk Naval Shipyard on 31 March for regular overhaul followed by drydock in May. On 28 June 1965, Lind got underway for two days of trials in the Virginia capes operating area. She returned to her berth at Norfolk and remained there for almost a month.

The ship got underway on 23 July for Key West, Florida, where she conducted various antiair and anti-submarine warfare exercises. She finished the month at Port Everglades, Florida. On 5 August, Wallace L. Lind arrived at Mayport, Florida, and, four days later, took departure for Guantanamo Bay, Cuba, arriving there on 12 August.

Having successfully completed post-overhaul trials and shakedown, Wallace L. Lind departed Guantanamo on 25 September. The destroyer made stops at Culebra and Roosevelt Roads, Puerto Rico, as well as Charlotte Amalie, Saint Thomas, U.S. Virgin Islands. She returned to Norfolk on 1 October 1965. On 25 October, the ship got underway and finished the month conducting exercises in the Jacksonville, Florida, operating area.

Wallace L. Lind returned to Norfolk on 5 November and prepared for a transatlantic deployment which commenced on 27 November. She stopped briefly at Gibraltar on 8 December, then visited Livorno and Naples, Italy.

=== 1966 ===
The New Year 1966 found Wallace L. Lind at Naples, the second of her Mediterranean cruise ports. The destroyer operated out of ports in Italy, France, and Spain and participated in a two-week search for a nuclear weapon lost off the coast of Spain. On 9 March, she joined Franco-American forces for an already-in-progress amphibious exercise off the coast of Santa Monza, Corsica. On 16 March, the ship began her homeward journey and arrived at Norfolk, 10 days later.

From 18 April to 6 May, Wallace L. Lind conducted ASW operations with other units of DesRon 2 and three German destroyers. She then participated in the orientation of the carrier Wasp at Guantanamo Bay; and, upon her return to Norfolk, she remained in port for almost a month. The summer months from June through September were spent working with Fleet Sonar School, Key West, Florida, and conducting a midshipmen summer cruise.

On 7 September, the destroyer headed for the Gemini Recovery Station off the Florida coast and was responsible for emergency recovery of the Gemini II astronauts should an abort of the mission occur within the first three minutes of flight. The remainder of the year was spent conducting various anti-submarine warfare exercises including "Aswex V" which was prematurely terminated by the collision of the carrier Essex and submarine Nautilus. The ship then underwent predeployment overhaul.

On 10 January 1967, Wallace L. Lind departed the Destroyer and Submarine Pier, Norfolk, and commenced a Mediterranean tour. During the eastward transit, Lind had a unique experience in anti-submarine warfare practice. The highlight of the cruise came when, after 25 hours of continuous tracking, the officers and crew of the destroyer, in coordination with other forces, successfully surfaced a Soviet Foxtrot submarine off the Straits of Gibraltar on 21 January.

The ship visited ports in Italy, Spain, and France before steaming from Naples on 30 March to rendezvous for Operation "Dawn Clear 67," a combined exercise with the NATO forces. Wallace L. Lind also participated in Operation "Spanex 1-67," an exercise with the Spanish Navy, and Operation "Fair Game V" with the French Navy. On 11 May, the destroyer began the journey home and arrived at Norfolk on 20 May 1967.

After several weeks of type training, the ship spent July, August, and September taking part in ASW Exercise "Fixwex Golf 67"; Operation "Lash Out," a NATO exercise which simulated an attack on the east coast; as well as various other exercises and tender availability. On 3 October, Wallace L. Lind arrived at the Boston Naval Shipyard to have a special sound source installed in place of the variable depth sonar. She then headed for the Bahama Islands to take part in Operation "Fixwex I," an exercise designed to measure submarine and task group noise levels. The destroyer spent the remainder of 1967 undergoing availability and in leave and upkeep. During this period, the special sound source was removed, and the ship was returned to her original configuration.

=== Vietnam War ===
During January 1968, Wallace L. Lind participated in Operation "Springboard" in the Caribbean. The exercise was completed on 6 February; and, upon her return to Norfolk, the destroyer provided pro-submarine services for SUBLANT, followed by an extended period of availability and pre-deployment preparations.

The ship began an eight-month distant deployment on 9 April by steaming out of Norfolk for the Western Pacific (WestPac) via the Panama Canal. After stopping at Pearl Harbor and Guam, she reached Subic Bay, Philippine Islands, on 20 May. Five days later, Wallace L. Lind headed toward the Gulf of Tonkin acting as screen command for the carrier America. Upon arrival, she assumed duty as screen commander and plane guard destroyer for the aircraft carrier Ticonderoga, and also joined Enterprise for more plane guard duty. After a brief period of leave on 1 July she returned to her station in the Gulf of Tonkin and served as plane guard for Bon Homme Richard, relieved the destroyer Steinaker as southwest anti-air warfare picket, and again operated with Ticonderoga.

From 17 July through 9 October, the destroyer took three turns on the "Gunline" off the DMZ. During this period, she visited Subic Bay and Hong Kong for liberty. Departing the "Gunline" on 9 October, Wallace L. Lind stopped at Yokosuka, Japan, and made preparations for the return voyage across the Pacific. She arrived at Norfolk on 27 November 1968, and finished up the year in a period of leave, upkeep, and post-deployment repairs.

The year 1969 was devoted almost entirely to maintenance and training. On 27 January, Wallace L. Lind reported to the Norfolk Naval Shipyard, Portsmouth, Virginia., for regular overhaul which was completed on 10 June. The vessel spent a month in Norfolk preparing for "Project X-SI"; and on 24 July, she set course for San Juan for testing her new additions. The destroyer returned to Norfolk for the final evaluation of the project on 14 August. On 17 September, the ship arrived at Guantanamo for refresher training which lasted through 20 November. During the month of October, Wallace L. Lind’s home port was changed to Pearl Harbor effective on 1 January 1970.

=== 1970 ===
The destroyer spent January and February 1970 conducting a brief excursion in the Virginia Capes-Florida areas. She arrived back at Norfolk on 8 March for tender availability. After a series of delays, extensions, and standbys, Wallace L. Lind made a colorful arrival in Hawaii on 18 April, having transited the Panama Canal and visited San Diego.

Throughout May and June, the destroyer qualified as a naval gunfire ship and participated in "Comtuex," an exercise in anti-submarine and antiair warfare and all facets of destroyer seamanship. She then conducted ASW operations with the Japanese Maritime Self-Defense Force submarine Michishio in preparation for "Aswex 1-70," a joint United States, Japanese, and British Commonwealth ASW exercise which lasted from 19 to 26 June. A period of tender availability followed.

On 12 August 1970, Wallace L. Lind sailed out of Pearl Harbor to commence deployment to WestPac. She arrived at Subic Bay, Philippines, on 27 August for type training and embarked COMDESDIV 252. The destroyer then made rendezvous with America (CVA-66) to act as a plane guard destroyer. From 14 to 17 September, she participated in antiair warfare Exercise "Beacon Tower" in the Gulf of Tonkin. On 21 September, she arrived at Okinawa for fuel and embarked a Beachjumper Unit. Two days later, the destroyer again made rendezvous with America for operations in the Sea of Japan, followed by upkeep at Yokosuka and Sasebo, Japan, where she debarked COMDESDIV 252.

On 19 October, Wallace L. Lind embarked three Japanese officers to act as observers for "ASWEX 5-70," a week-long exercise which got underway on 22 October. The destroyer arrived at Yokosuka, Japan, and underwent upkeep prior to departure for Taiwan on 9 November. After a brief Taiwan patrol and a stop at Subic Bay on 16 November, the destroyer got underway for "FIREX" and conducted typhoon evasion exercises.

On 28 November, Wallace L. Lind arrived at her station on the "Gunline" off the coast of South Vietnam. She conducted operations through 12 December when she departed for Hong Kong. Two days later, she arrived in the port of Hong Kong and relieved Vernon County (LST-1161) as SOPA.

Wallace L. Lind departed Hong Kong on 5 January 1971. The destroyer spent the month of January rotating plane guard duty among Kitty Hawk, Wainwright, Chicago, Hollister, and Ranger. On 4 February, the destroyer performed amphibious operations off the coast of South Vietnam; then, on 11 February, she proceeded independently to Subic Bay, Philippines, to prepare for her return to Pearl Harbor. Lind arrived in Hawaii on the morning of 26 February 1971

During March and April, the crew enjoyed a well-earned rest, and the ship received some necessary repairs. The destroyer conducted various exercises in the Hawaiian operating areas throughout May and June. On 27 July, Wallace L. Lind departed Pearl Harbor for Portland, Oregon, her new home port. Upon her arrival on 4 August, the destroyer assumed a new mission as a Naval Reserve ship responsible for the training of inactive duty reservists from the western United States. By 31 August, Wallace L. Lind had completed her transition to the Naval Reserve Force and embarked upon a cruise to the Washington-Oregon coastal area which lasted through 10 September. In October 1971, the destroyer underwent tender availability at San Diego, returned to Portland one month later, and tied up at Swan Island where she remained through the close of 1971.

January, February, and March 1972 were spent undergoing repairs at Portland. On 25 March, Wallace L. Lind set to sea and conducted gunnery exercises off the coast of Washington, then sailed to San Francisco, where she rearmed before returning to Portland. On 6 April, the destroyer got underway for Seattle, Washington, the first of six such trips that she would make in the next eight months. While in Washington, she attended the Daffodil Festival at Tacoma. Lind conducted a reservist training cruise to Pearl Harbor, arriving on 24 June. In August, the destroyer sailed north to Juneau, Alaska. She followed this trip with a transit of the Columbia River to the Astoria Regatta festival. During September, Lind’s only sea time was a three-day trip to Esquimalt, British Columbia, with her select reserve crew embarked for training purposes. On 24 October, she got underway for San Diego and a three-week availability. On 18 November, Wallace L. Lind set sail for her home port of Portland, where she remained for the rest of the year.

The last year of her commissioned service saw Wallace L. Lind become active in the recruiting effort as well as in her duties as a Naval Reserve training ship. From 9 to 25 January 1973, the ship underwent restricted availability in Portland, and it was discovered that drydocking was necessary to correct some hull problems. On 12 February, the destroyer entered dry-dock for a nine-day period. After re-arming at Bangor, Washington, she headed south and arrived at San Diego on 1 March. The destroyer conducted three days of local operations; then, along with the destroyer James C. Owens, cruised to Mazatlán, Mexico.

Wallace L. Lind returned to San Diego on 17 March and conducted a brief period of operations with a reserve crew. On 26 April, the ship cruised to Anchorage, Alaska, to participate in a mass recruiting effort which included conducting ship's visits and a "Go Navy" cruise. After a final INSURV inspection in May, Lind remained berthed at her home port until she cruised to Vancouver, Washington, to participate in Fourth of July celebrations.

On 1 August, Wallace L. Lind departed Portland for Hawaii. However, two days out of San Francisco, she developed engine trouble and limped back to port. On 17 August, the ship steamed out of San Francisco and returned to Portland.

== ROKS Dae Gu ==
On 25 September 1973, USS Wallace L. Lind passed the familiar Columbia lightship for the last time as she sailed for San Diego. After spending the weekend conducting tours, she moved to the naval station on 1 October. Work was then begun in earnest to prepare Wallace L. Lind for decommissioning and transfer to the Republic of Korea under the Military Assistance Program. The first contingent of Korean officers and men arrived on 16 November, with the majority arriving in San Diego on 29 and 30 November. Wallace L. Lind was decommissioned and stricken from the U.S. Navy list on 4 December 1973, and officially transferred on that date to the Republic of Korea. She served in the Republic of Korea Navy as ROKS Dae Gu (DD-917). In 1994, she was stricken, and broken up for scrap.

== Awards ==
Wallace L. Lind earned four battle stars for World War II service, four for service in the Korean War, and three for her Vietnam service.
