= Fawn-class destroyer =

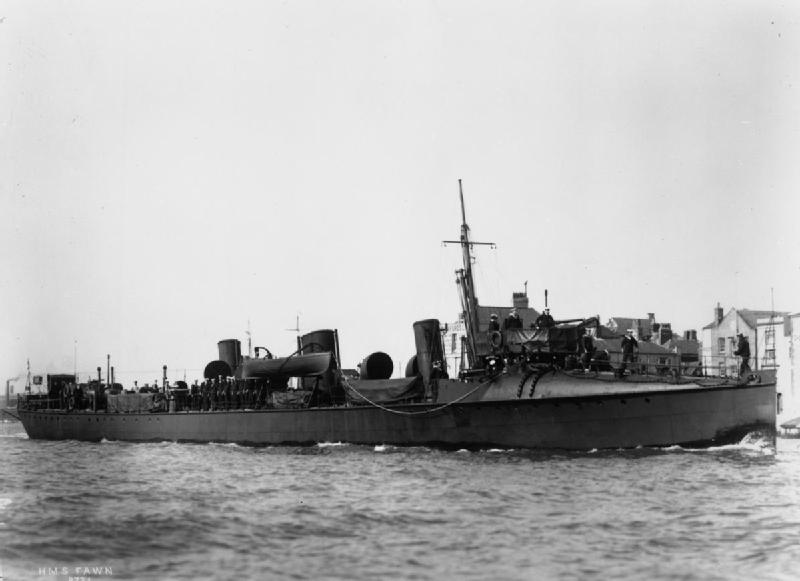
- HMS Fawn

Class overview
- Name: Fawn class
- Operators: Royal Navy
- In commission: 1897–1919
- Completed: 2
- Lost: 1
- Retired: 1

General characteristics
- Type: Destroyer

The Fawn-class destroyer was a class of two destroyers that served in the Royal Navy: Fawn, and Flirt.
