= Chungmu-class destroyer =

Destroyers of the South Korean Navy

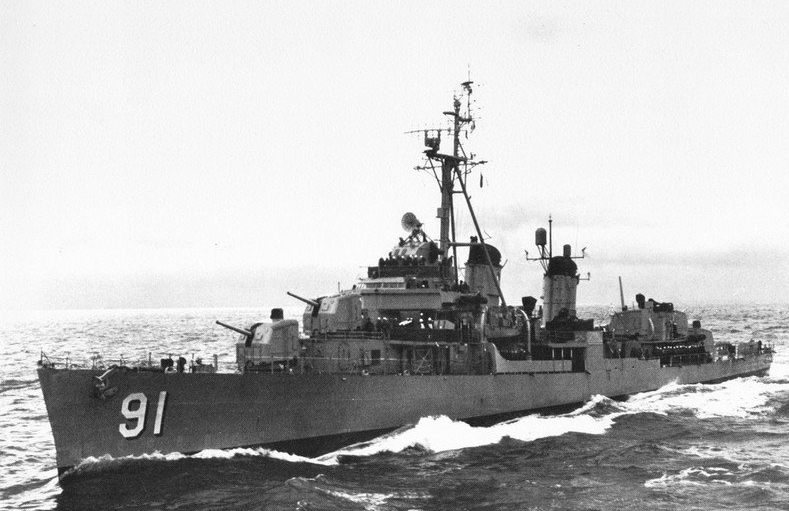
- ROKS Chungmu

Class overview
- Name: Chungmu
- Builders: Bath Iron Works; Bethlehem Mariners Harbor; Federal Shipbuilding and Drydock Company
- Operators: Republic of Korea Navy
- Preceded by: N/A
- Succeeded by: Chungbuk class
- Subclasses: Fletcher class
- Built: 1942-1943
- In commission: 1963-1993
- Planned: 3
- Completed: 3
- Retired: 3

General characteristics
- Type: Destroyer
- Displacement: 2,050 long tons (2,083 t) standard; 2,500 long tons (2,540 t) full
- Length: 376.5 ft (114.8 m)
- Beam: 39.5 ft 10 in (12.29 m)
- Draft: 17.5 ft 8 in (5.54 m)
- Propulsion: 4 × GM Mod. 16-278A diesel engines with electric drive, 60,000 shp (45 MW); 2 × screws
- Speed: 36.5 knots (67.6 km/h; 42.0 mph)
- Range: 5,500 nmi (10,200 km) at 15 kn (28 km/h; 17 mph)
- Complement: 329
- Sensors & processing systems: 1 × AN/SPS-6 air-search radar; 1 × AN/SPS-10 surface-search radar; 1 × Mark 37 Director
- Armament: 5 × single 5"/38 cal guns; 1 × twin 40 mm bofors; 2 × quad 40 mm bofors; 2 × triple Mark 44 torpedo tubes; 2 × Mark 10 Hedgehog mortars; 1 × depth charge track

The Chungmu class was a class of 3 destroyers in the Republic of Korea Navy. They entered service in 1963, with the last one being decommissioned in 1989.

== History ==
South Korea received three destroyers of the Fletcher class for the Republic of Korea Navy from the United States in 1963 as part of the American Military Assistance Program.

This was the first destroyer class of the Republic of Korea Navy. While the Gwanggaeto the Great-class destroyer were Korea's first domestically built destroyers, ships of the Chungmu class, were the first destroyers to serve in the Republic of Korea Navy.

The class consisted of three destroyers used by the US Navy during World War II and slightly modernized in electronics and weaponry at the beginning of the 1950s. They were once magnificent ships, which throughout the 1960s constituted the backbone of the Republic of Korea Navy. Eventually, they were replaced in escort duties by the Chungbuk class destroyers in the mid to late 1980s. However, they remained in service until well into the 1980s, by which point they were quite obsolete. They were all leased until 1977 then bought by the navy.

They were all put out of service between 1982 and 1993.

== Characteristics ==
Before the takeover, the ships were modernized considerably. All 20 mm Oerlikon cannons were removed while the two quad and one twin 40 mm Bofors guns remained. The electronics were modernized and the mast was replaced by a tripod mast.

All ships were retrofitted with two triple Mark 44 torpedo tubes on each side of the ship.

== Ships in the class ==
Construction data
Pennant	Name	Builder	Laid down	Launched	Comm.	Decomm.
DD-91/DD-911	Chungmu	Bath Iron Works	28 Oct 1942	21 Mar 1943	16 May 1963	1993
DD-92/DD-912	Seoul	Bethlehem Mariners Harbor	3 Feb 1943	30 Jun 1943	27 Apr 1968	1982
DD-93/DD-913	Busan	Federal Shipbuilding and Drydock Company	12 Mar 1943	4 Jul 1943	15 Nov 1968	1989

== See also ==
- List of destroyer classes

Equivalent destroyers of the same era

- Yamagumo class
- Friesland class
- Impetuoso class
- Kotlin class
