= List of destroyer classes =

This is a list of destroyer classes.

== Argentina (Armada de la República Argentina) ==
- Corrientes class— 4 ships
- Catamarca class— 2 ships
- La Plata class — 2 ships
- Cervantes class — 2 ships, ex-Churruca class
- Mendoza class— 3 ships
- Buenos Aires class— 7 ships, improved G class
- Almirante Domecq García class — 5 ships, ex-Fletcher class
- Seguí class — 3 ships, ex -Allen M. Sumner class
- Comodoro Py class — 1 ship, ex-Gearing class
- Hercules class — 2 ships (same as UK's Type 42 class)
- Almirante Brown class — 4 ships, MEKO 360 H2

== Australia (Royal Australian Navy) ==
- River class — 6 ships
- Anzac class — 1 ship
- Stalwart class — 5 ships
- V and W class — 4 ships
- Scott class — 1 ship
- Nizam class — 5 ships
- Arunta class — 3 ships
- Quadrant class — 5 ships
- Battle class — 2 ships
- Daring class — 3 ships
- Perth class — 3 ships
- Hobart class — 3 ships

== Austria-Hungary (Austro-Hungarian Navy) ==
- Huszár class — 13 ships
- Warasdiner class— 1 ship
- Tátra class— 6 ships
- Ersatz Triglav class— 4 ships

== Brazil (Marinha do Brasil) ==
- Pará class — 10 ships
- Marcilio Dias class — 3 ships
- Jurua class — 6 ships ordered but requisitioned by the Royal Navy as Havant class
- Acre class — 6 ships
- Pará class — 7 ships, ex-Fletcher class
- Mato Grosso class — 5 ships, ex-Allen M. Sumner class
- Marcilio Dias class — 2 ships, ex-Gearing class
- Pará class — 4 ships, ex-Garcia class

== Bulgaria (Bulgarian Navy) ==
- Fidonisy class - 1 ship
- Ognevoy class - 1 ship

== Canada (Royal Canadian Navy) ==
- M or Patriot class — 2 ships
- Vancouver class — 2 ships, ex-S class
- River class — 14 ships
- Montgomery class — 5 ships, ex-Clemson class
- St Croix class — 3 ships, ex-Wickes class
- Tribal class — 8 ships
- Algonquin class — 2 ships
- Crescent class — 2 ships
- St Laurent class — 7 ships
- Restigouche class — 7 ships
- Mackenzie class — 4 ships
- Annapolis class — 2 ships
- Iroquois class — 4 ships

== Chile (Armada de Chile) ==
- Capitán Orella class — 4 ships
- Capitán Merino Jarpa class — 3 ships
- Almirante Lynch class — 6 ships planned, 5 delivered
- Serrano class — 6 ships
- Almirante class — 2 ships
- Blanco Encalada class — 2 ships and 1 spare ship, ex-Fletcher class
- Serrano class — 4 ships, ex-Buckley class
- Ministro Zenteno class — 2 ships, ex-Allen M. Sumner class
- Prat class — 4 ships, ex-County class

== China ==
=== Qing dynasty (Imperial Chinese Navy) ===
- Hai Lung class — 4 ships
- Chang Feng class — 3 ships

=== People's Republic of China (People's Liberation Army Navy) ===
- Anshan class— 4 ships, all retired (ex-Gnevny class)
- Sovremennyy class— 4 ships in active service
- Type 051 (NATO codename Luda) — 17 ships, all retired
- Type 052 (NATO codename Luhu) — 2 ships in active service
- Type 051B (NATO codename Luhai) — 1 ship in active service
- Type 052B (NATO codename Luyang I) — 2 ships in active service
- Type 051C (NATO codename Luzhou) — 2 ships in active service
- Type 052C (NATO codename Luyang II) — 6 ships in active service
- Type 052D — 22 ships in active service, 6 in sea trials and 4 under construction
- Type 055 — 3 ship in active service, 4 in sea trials and 3 under construction

=== Republic of China (Zhōnghuá Mínguó Hǎijūn) ===
- Chao Yang class — 14 ships (ex-Gearing class)
- Lo Yang class — 8 ships (ex-Allen M. Sumner class)
- Heng Yang class — 4 ships (ex-Fletcher class)
- Keelung class — 4 ships (ex-Kidd class)

== Colombia (Armada de la República de Colombia) ==
- Antioquia class — 2 ships, ex-Douro class
- Halland class — 2 ships
- Antioquia class — 1 ship, ex-Fletcher class
- Caldas class — 2 ships, ex-Allen M. Sumner class

== Denmark (Royal Danish Navy) ==
- Hunt class - 3 ships

== Dominican Republic (Dominican Navy) ==
- H class - 1 ship Trujillo
- F class - 1 ship Generalisimo

== Ecuador (Armada del Ecuador) ==
- Hunt class - 2 ships
- Presidente Eloy Alfaro class - 1 ship, ex-Gearing class

== Egypt (Egyptian Navy) ==
- El Fateh class — 2 ships, ex-Z class
- El Nasser class — 3 ships, ex-Project 30bis
- Hunt-class destroyer escort - 2 ships

== Estonia (Eesti Merevägi) ==
- Wambola class — 1 ship, ex-Orfei class
- Lennuk class — 1 ship, ex-Izyaslav class

== France (Marine Nationale) ==
- Durandal class (1899) — 4 ships
- Framée class (1899) — 4 ships
- Rochefortais or Pertuisane class (1900) — 4 ships
- Arquebuse class (1902) — 20 ships
- Claymore class (1905) — 13 ships
- Branlebas class (1907) — 10 ships
- Spahi class (1908) — 7 ships
- Voltigeur class (1908) — 2 ships
- Chasseur class (1909) — 4 ships
- Bouclier class (1911) — 12 ships
- Bisson class (1912) — 6 ships
- Enseigne Roux class (1915) — 3 ships
- Arabe class (1917) — 12 ships
- Chacal class (1926) — 6 ships
- Bourrasque class (1926) — 12 ships
- Adroit class (1928) — 14 ships
- Guépard class (1929) — 6 ships
- Aigle class (1932) — 6 ships
- Vauquelin class (1933) — 6 ships
- Fantasque class (1935) — 6 ships
- Mogador class (1939) — 2 ships
- T 47 class (1955) — 12 ships
- T 53 class (1957) — 6 ships
- Aconit — 1 ship
- Suffren class (1967) - 2 ships
- Tourville class (1975) — 3 ships
- Georges Leygues class (1979) - 7 ships
- Cassard class (1988) - 2 ships
- Horizon class (2007) - 2 ships in service
- Aquitaine class (2012) - 8 ships in service
- Amiral Ronarc'h class (2025)

== Greece (Hellenic Navy) ==
=== Royal Hellenic Navy (1832–1974) ===
- Niki class — 4 ships
- Thyella class — 4 ships
- Aetos class — 4 ships
- Kriti class — 4 ships ordered but requisitioned by Royal Navy as Medea class
- Keravnos class — 2 ships
- Hydra class — 4 ships
- Vasilefs Georgios class — 2 ships, modified G class
- Salamis class — 1 ship, ex-B class
- Navarinon class — 1 ship, ex-E class
- Adrias class — 8 ships, ex-Hunt class
- Doxa class — 2 ships, ex-Gleaves class
- Wild Beast class — 4 ships, ex-Cannon class
- Sfnedoni class — 6 ships, ex-Fletcher class

=== Hellenic Navy (1974–Present) ===
- Themistocles class — 7 ships, ex-Gearing class
- Nearchus class — 4 ships, ex-Charles F. Adams class

== India (Bharatiya Nau Sena) ==
- Hunt class — 8 ships
- Ranjit class — 3 ships
- Rajput class — 5 ships
- Delhi class — 3 ships
- Kolkata class — 3 ships
- Visakhapatnam class — 4 ships
- Project 18-class destroyer — 6-10 ships planned.

== Indonesia (Tentara Nasional Indonesia-Angkatan Laut) ==
- Imam Bondjol class – 2 ships, ex-Almirante Clemente class
- Gadjah Mada class – 1 ship, ex-N class
- Siliwangi class — 7 ships, ex-Skory class

== Iran (Iranian Navy) ==
- Damavand class — 1 ship
- Babr class — 2 ships
- Gearing-class - 2 ships
- Jamaran class — 2 ships
- Khalije Fars class — Under construction

== Israel (Israeli Navy) ==
- Z-class destroyer - 2 ships
- Hunt-class destroyer escort - 1 ship

== Italy (Italian Navy) ==
=== Regia Marina (1861–1946) ===
- Lampo class — 5 ships
- Nembo class — 6 ships
- Soldato class — 10 ships
- Indomito class — 6 ships
- Ardito class — 2 ships
- Audace class — 2 ships
- Rosolino Pilo class — 8 ships
- Alessandro Poerio class — 3 ships
- Aquila class — 4 ships, originally ordered by Romania
- Mirabello class — 3 ships
- La Masa class — 8 ships
- Giuseppe Sirtori class — 4 ships
- Palestro class — 4 ships
- Generali class — 6 ships
- Curtatone class — 4 ships
- Leone class — 3 ships
- Sella class — 4 ships
- Sauro class — 4 ships
- Turbine or Borea class — 8 ships
- Navigatori class — 12 ships
- Freccia or Dardo class — 4 ships
- Folgore class — 4 ships
- Maestrale class — 4 ships
- Oriani class — 4 ships
- Soldati class — 12 ships

=== Marina Militare (1946–present) ===
- Benson class — 1 ship
- Gleaves class — 1 ship
- Fletcher class — 3 ships
- Impetuoso class — 2 ships
- Impavido class — 2 ships
- Audace class — 2 ships
- Luigi Durand de la Penne class — 2 ships
- Andrea Doria class — 2 ships

== Japan ==
- Asakaze class — 2 ships
- Ariake class — 2 ships
- Harukaze class — 2 ships
- Ayanami class — 7 ships
- Murasame class — 3 ships
- Akizuki class — 2 ships
- Yamagumo class — 6 ships
- Takatsuki class — 4 ships
- Minegumo class — 3 ships
- Haruna class — 2 ships
- Shirane class — 2 ships
- Hatsuyuki class — 12 ships
- Asagiri class — 8 ships
- Hatakaze class — 2 ships
- Kongō class — 4 ships
- Murasame class — 9 ships
- Takanami class — 5 ships
- Atago class — 2 ships
- Hyūga class — 2 ships
- Akizuki class — 4 ships
- Izumo class — 2 ships
- Asahi class — 2 ships
- Maya class — 2 ships

== Manchukuo (Manchukuo Imperial Navy) ==
- Hai Wei class - 1 ship (ex-Momo class)

== Mexico (Armada de México) ==
- Coahuila class — 1 ship, ex-Buckley class
- Cuauhtémoc class — 2 ships, ex-Fletcher class
- Quetzalcoatl class — 3 ships, ex-Gearing class
- Manuel Azueta class — 1 ship, converted Edsall class

== Netherlands (Koninklijke Marine) ==
- Wolf class (Roofdier class) — 8 ships
- Admiralen class — 8 ships
- Gerard Callenburgh class — 2 ships
- Van Galen class — 2 ships, ex-N class
- S class - 2 ships
- G class - 1 ship
- Q class - 1 ship
- Wickes class - 1 ship
- Holland class — 4 ships
- Friesland class — 8 ships

== North Korea (Korean People's Army Navy) ==
- Choe Hyon class - 1

== Norway (Kongelige Norske Marine) ==
- Draug class — 3 ships
- Sleipner class — 6 ships
- Ålesund class - 2 ships (Never completed)
- Stord class — 2 ships, ex-S class
- Town class — 5 vessels on loan from the Royal Navy.
- Oslo class — 4 ships, ex-C class
- Hunt class — 5 ships

== Pakistan (Pɑkistan Bahri'a) ==
- Tariq class — 3 ships, ex-O class
- Taimur class — 4 ships, ex-C class
- Badr class — 2 ships, ex-Battle class
- Tariq class — 3 ships, ex-Gearing class
- Babur class — 1 ship, ex-County class
- Tariq class — 5 ships, ex-Amazon-class

== Peru (Marina de Guerra del Perú) ==
- Teniente Rodríguez class — 1 ship
- Almirante Guise class — 1 ship, ex-Izyaslav class
- Almirante Villar class — 1 ship, ex-Orfei class
- Villar class — 2 ships, ex-Fletcher class
- Palacios class — 2 ships, ex-Daring class
- Garcia y Garcia class — 1 ship, ex-Holland class
- Colonel Bolognesi class — 7 ships, ex-Friesland class

== Poland (Marynarka Wojenna) ==
- Wicher class — 2 ships
- Grom class — 2 ships
- Garland — 1 ship, ex-G class
- Piorun class — 1 ship, ex-N class
- Orkan class — 1 ship, ex-M class
- Hunt (Batch III) class — 3 ships
- Bourrasque class - 1 ship
- Wicher class — 2 ships, ex-Project 30 class
- Warszawa class — 1 ship, ex-Project 56AE
- Warszawa class — 1 ship ex-Project 61MP

== Portugal (Marinha Portuguesa) ==
- Tejo class — 1 ship
- Guadiana class — 4 ships
- Liz class — 1 ship
- Vouga class — 5 ships

== Romania (Romanian Navy) ==
- Regele Ferdinand class — 2 ships
- Mărăști class - 2 ships (Aquila-class scout cruisers rearmed as destroyers)
- Amiral Murgescu class - 1 ship completed (minelaying destroyer escort)

== Russia/USSR (Russian Navy) ==
=== Soviet Navy ===
- Leningrad class — 6 ships
- Tashkent class — 1 ship
- Gnevny class — 28 ships
- Soobrazitelnyy class — 18 ships
- Opytny class — 1 ship
- Ognevoy class — 11 ships
- Zhivushiy (ex-USS) class — 9 ships
- Likhoy class — 2 ships, ex-Regele Ferdinand class
- Legky class — 2 ships, ex-Marasti class
- Prytky class — 2 ships, ex-Zerstörer 1934A class
- Prochny class — 1 ship, ex-German Zerstörer 1936A class
- Soldati class — 2 ships, ex-Soldati class
- Skoryy class — 70 ships
- Neustrashimy class — 1 ship
- Kotlin class — 27 ships
- Kildin class — 4 ships
- Krupny class — 7 ships
- Kashin class — 25 ships
- Sovremennyy class — 21 ships
- Udaloy class — 16 ships

== Siam (Royal Siamese Navy) ==
- Sua Taynchon class — 2 ships
- Phra Ruang class — 1 ship

== South Africa (South African Navy) ==
- W class — 2 ships

== South Korea (Republic of Korea Navy) ==
- Chungmu class — 3 ships, ex-Fletcher class
- Chungbuk class — 7 ships, ex-Gearing class
- Dae Gu class — 2 ships, ex-Allen M. Sumner class
- Gwanggaeto the Great class — 3 ships
- Chungmugong Yi Sunshin class — 6 ships
- Sejong the Great class — 3 ships

== Spain (Armada Española) ==
- Destructor class — 1 ship
- Furor class — 6 ships
- Bustamante class — 3 ships
- Alsedo class — 3 ships
- Churruca class — 16 ships
- Teruel class — 2 ships
- Ceuta class — 2 ships
- Liniers class — 2 ships
- Audaz class — 9 ships
- Oquendo class — 3 ships
- Lepanto class — 5 ships, ex-Fletcher class
- Churruca class — 5 ships, ex-Gearing class

== Sweden (Swedish Navy) ==
- Ragnar class — 3 ships
- Hugin class — 2 ships
- Wrangel class — 2 ships
- Ehrenskold class — 2 ships
- Klas class — 2 ships
- Göteborg class — 6 ships
- Psilander class — 2 ships
- Romulus class — 2 ships
- Mode class — 4 ships
- Visby class — 4 ships
- Öland class — 2 ships
- Halland class — 2 ships
- Östergotland class — 4 ships

== Turkey (Osmanlı Donanması / Türk Deniz Kuvvetleri) ==
- Samsun class — 4 ships
- Muavenet-i Milliye class — 4 ships
- Adatepe class — 2 ships
- Tinaztepe class — 2 ships
- Gaziantep class — 4 ships (ex-Gleaves class)
- Demirhisar class — 4 ships (ex-I class)
- Alp Arslan class — 4 ships (ex-M class)
- Geyret class — 1 ship (ex-O and P class)
- İstanbul class — 5 ships (ex-Fletcher class)
- Zafer class - 1 ship (ex-Allen M. Sumner class
- Zafer class — 2 ships (ex-Robert H. Smith class)
- Yücetepe class — 10 ships (ex-Gearing class)
- Alçıtepe class — 2 ships (ex-Gearing class)
- Berk class — 2 ships (ex-Claud Jones class)
- Gelibolu class - 3 ships (ex-Köln class)

== United Kingdom (Royal Navy) ==
=== Torpedo Boat Destroyers ===
In 1913, the surviving units among the large heterogeneous array of older Torpedo Boat Destroyer types of the "27-knotter" and "30-knotter" varieties were organised into the A, B, C and D classes according to their design speed and the number of funnels they possessed. The earlier "26-knotters" were not included as all six vessels had been deleted before 1913.

- 26-knot classes
  - Daring class— 2 ships
  - Havock class — 2 ships
  - Ferret class — 2 ships
- A class; (27-knot classes) — 36 original ships in this group
  - Ardent class— 3 ships
  - Charger class— 3 ships
  - Fervent class— 2 ships
  - Hardy class — 2 ships
  - Janus class— 3 ships
  - Salmon class— 2 ships
  - Banshee class — 3 ships
  - Conflict class— 3 ships
  - Handy class — 3 ships
  - Opossum class — 3 ships
  - Rocket class— 3 ships
  - Sturgeon class — 3 ships
  - Swordfish class— 2 ships
  - Zebra class — 1 ship
- B class (4-funnelled, 30-knot (56 km/h) classes)
  - Quail class — 4 ships
  - Earnest class — 6 ships
  - Spiteful class — 2 ships
  - Myrmidon class — 2 ships
- C class (3-funnelled, 30-knot (56 km/h) classes)
  - Star class — 6 ships
  - Avon class — 3 ships
  - Brazen class — 4 ships
  - Violet class — 2 ships
  - Mermaid class — 2 ships
  - Gipsy class — 3 ships
  - Bullfinch class — 3 ships
  - Fawn class — 6 ships
  - Falcon class — 2 ships
  - Greyhound class — 3 ships
  - Thorn class — 3 ships
  - Hawthorn special type — 2 ships
  - Thornycroft special — 1 ship
  - Armstrong-Whitworth special, — 1 ship
- D class; (2-funnelled, 30-knot (56 km/h) classes)

Unlike the A, B and C classes, all the (two-funnel) D class were built by one shipbuilder (Thornycroft) and comprised a single class, with minor modifications between batches

  - Desperate group — 4 ships
  - Angler group — 2 ships
  - Coquette group — 3 ships
  - Stag special type — 1 ship

=== Conventional destroyers ===
In 1913, lettered names were given to all Royal Navy destroyers, previously known after the first ship of that class. The River or E class of 1913 were the first destroyers of the Royal Navy with a recognisable modern configuration.

- River or E class — 33 ships
- Tribal or F class — 13 ships
- Beagle or G class — 16 ships
- Acorn or H class — 20 ships
- Acheron or I class — 23 ships
- Acasta or K class — 20 ships
- Swift type — 1 ship
- Laforey or L class — 22 ships
- Arno type — 1 ship
- Admiralty M class — 74 ships
- Hawthorn M class — 2 ships
- Yarrow M class — 10 ships
- Thornycroft M class — 6 ships
- Talisman class — 4 ships
- Medea class — 4 ships
- Faulknor class leader — 4 ships
- Marksman class leader — 7 ships
- Parker class leader — 6 ships
- Admiralty R class — 39 ships
- Yarrow Later M class — 7 ships
- Thornycroft R class — 5 ships
- Admiralty modified R class — 11 ships
- Admiralty S class — 55 ships
- Yarrow S class — 7 ships
- Thornycroft S class — 5 ships
- Admiralty V class — 28 ships
- Admiralty W class — 19 ships
- Thornycroft V and W class — 4 ships
- Thornycroft modified W class — 2 ships
- Admiralty modified W class — 15 ships
- Admiralty type leader — 8 ships
- Thornycroft type leader or Shakespeare class — 5 ships
- Ambuscade type — 1 ship
- Amazon type — 1 ship
- Inter-war standard classes
  - A class — 9 ships
  - B class — 9 ships
  - C class — 5 ships
  - D class — 9 ships
  - E class — 9 ships
  - F class — 9 ships
  - G class — 9 ships
  - H class — 9 ships
  - I class — 9 ships
  - ex-Brazilian H class — 6 ships
  - ex-Turkish I class — 2 ships
- Tribal class — 27 ships
- J, K and N class — 24 ships
- Hunt class — 83 ships
- L and M class — 16 ships
- Town class — 50 ships from three classes of United States Navy destroyers, transferred 1940
- World War II War Emergency Programme classes
  - O and P class — 16 ships
  - Q and R class — 16 ships
  - S and T class — 16 ships
  - U and V class — 16 ships
  - W and Z class — 16 ships
  - C class — 32 ships
- Battle class — 23 ships
- Weapon class — 4 ships
- Laid down post-war
  - Daring class — 8 ships

=== Guided-missile destroyers ===
- County class — 8 ships
- Type 82 — 1 ship
- Type 42 — 14 ships (6 Sheffield, 4 Exeter, 4 Manchester)
- Type 45 — 6 ships, commissioned 2009–2013

== United States (United States Navy) ==
- Bainbridge class — 13 ships
- Truxtun class — 3 ships
- Smith class — 5 ships
- Paulding class — 21 ships
- Cassin class — 8 ships
- O'Brien class — 6 ships
- Tucker class — 6 ships
- Sampson class — 6 ships
- Caldwell class — 6 ships
- Wickes class — 111 ships
- Clemson class — 156 ships
- Farragut class (1934) — 8 ships
- Porter class — 8 ships
- Mahan class — 18 ships
- Gridley class — 4 ships
- Bagley class — 8 ships
- Somers class — 5 ships
- Benham class — 10 ships
- Sims class — 12 ships
- Gleaves class — 66 ships
- Benson class — 30 ships
- Fletcher class — 175 ships
- Allen M. Sumner class — 58 ships
- Gearing class — 98 ships
- Mitscher class — 4 ships
- Forrest Sherman class — 18 ships
- Farragut class (1958) — 10 ships
- Charles F. Adams class — 23 ships
- Spruance class — 30 ships
- Kidd class — 4 ships
- Arleigh Burke class — 62 ships, 1989– (further ships are being constructed or planned)
- Zumwalt class — 3 ships (in construction or planning)

== Ukraine (Ukrainian Navy) ==
- Leitenant Pushchin class - 2 ships
- Ukrayna class - 1 ship

== Venezuela (ARBV) ==
- Allen M. Sumner-class - 2 ships
- Nueva Esparta class — 3 ships
- Almirante Clemente class — 6 ships

== Yugoslavia (Yugoslav Navy) ==
- Dubrovnik class — 1 ship
- Beograd class — 3 ships
- Split class — 1 ship
- W class — 2 ships
