= USS Rogers (DD-876) =

Gearing-class destroyer

Coordinates: 36.8913352°N 126.8251731°E

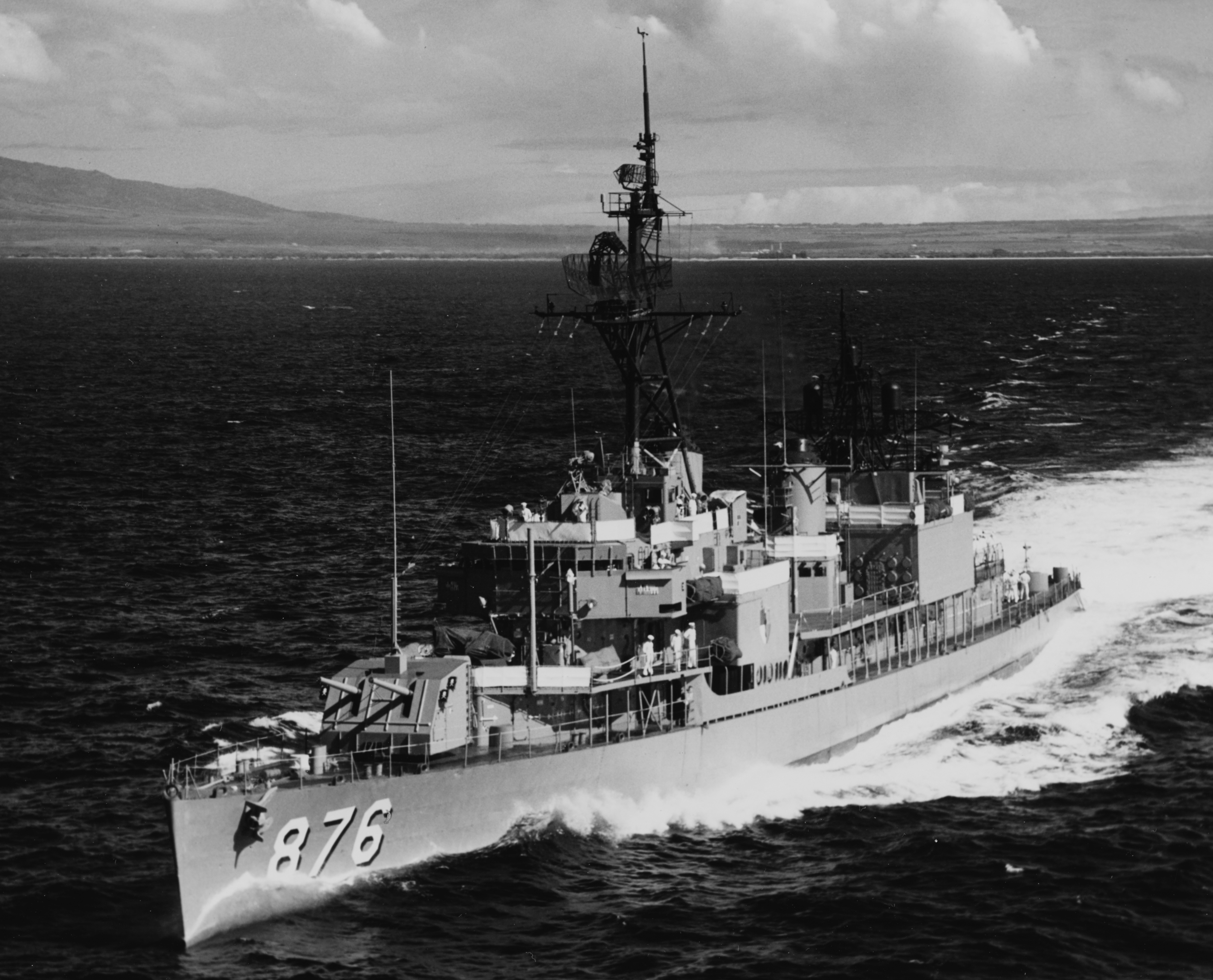
- USS Rogers on 8 September 1967

History

United States
- Name: Rogers
- Namesake: Jack Ellis Rogers Jr.; Charles Ethbert Rogers; Edward Keith Rogers
- Builder: Consolidated Steel Corporation
- Laid down: 3 June 1944
- Launched: 20 November 1944
- Commissioned: 26 March 1945
- Identification: Callsign: NBHM; Hull number: DD-876
- Reclassified: DDR-876, 18 March 1949
- Decommissioned: 1 October 1980
- Stricken: 1 October 1980
- Motto: On Target
- Honors and awards: 5 battle stars (South Korea); 3 battle stars (Vietnam); Meritorious Unit Commendation (USS Enterprise Fire)
- Fate: Transferred to South Korea, 25 July 1981
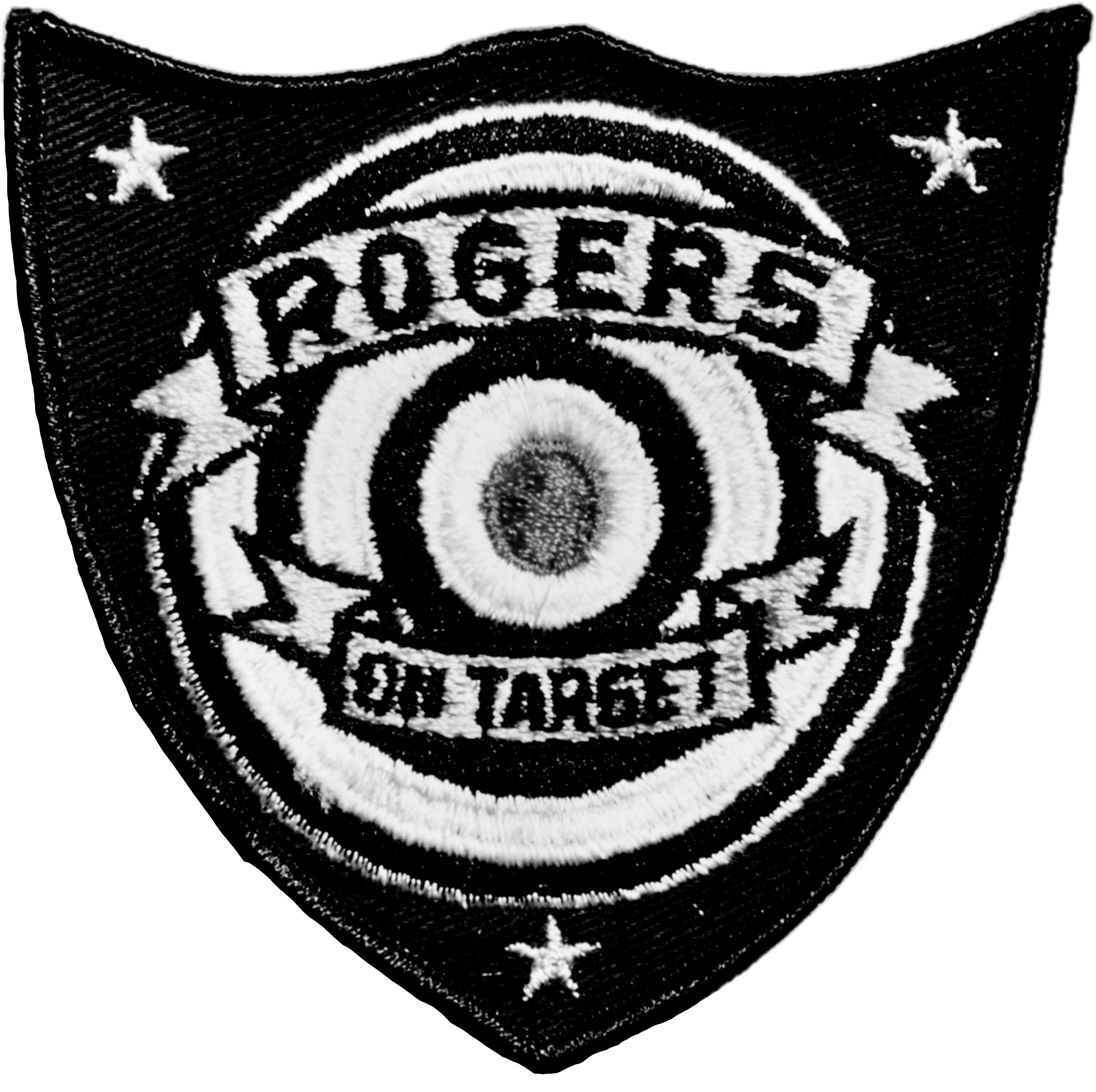
- Badge

South Korea
- Name: Jeongju; (전주)
- Acquired: 11 August 1981
- Decommissioned: 31 December 1999
- Identification: Hull number: DD-925
- Status: Museum ship in Dangjin

General characteristics
- Class & type: Gearing-class destroyer; Kangwon-class destroyer
- Displacement: 3,450 long tons (3,505 t)
- Length: 396 ft 8 in (121 m)
- Beam: 40 ft 10 in (12 m)
- Draft: 18 ft 6 in (6 m)
- Propulsion: 600 psi steam turbine reduction gear
- Speed: 34 knots (63 km/h; 39 mph)
- Complement: 260
- Armament: 4 × 5"/38 caliber guns; ASROC Anti-Submarine Missile Battery; Mark 44 torpedoes

USS Rogers (DD-876) was a Gearing-class destroyer of the United States Navy. She was named for three brothers — Jack Ellis Rogers Jr., Charles Ethbert Rogers, and Edward Keith Rogers — killed in action aboard USS New Orleans during the Battle of Tassafaronga in the Solomon Islands on 30 November 1942.

Rogers's keel was laid down on 3 June 1944 by Consolidated Steel Corporation at Orange, Texas. The ship was launched on 20 November 1944, sponsored by the Mother, Mrs. Josie Viola Taylor Rogers, wife of Jack Ellis Rogers Sr., and commissioned on 26 March 1945.

== Service history ==
=== World War II and afterwards, 1945–1949 ===
Following shakedown off Guantanamo Bay, Cuba, Rogers was converted to a picket ship at the Norfolk Naval Shipyard, Virginia. After further training in the Atlantic and Caribbean, Rogers transited the Panama Canal and touched at San Diego before reaching Pearl Harbor on 4 August 1945.

With the termination of hostilities, Rogers departed Pearl Harbor on 17 August for Tokyo Bay where she arrived on 31 August via Eniwetok and Iwo Jima. On 1 September she stood out of Tokyo Bay to join a fast carrier task group and commence her routine duties as a member of the 7th Fleet. Through the decade she rotated to the Far East for duty with that fleet on a regular schedule, and in 1949 assisted in evacuating American nationals from China.

Rogers participated in the "Operation Sandstone" atomic bomb tests in Eniwetok Atoll in 1948. On 18 March 1949, she was reclassified as a radar picket destroyer (DDR) after a height finder radar and more communication equipment had been added and her torpedo tubes had been removed.

=== Korean War, 1950–1953 ===
During 1951 and 1952, Rogers served as a unit of Task Forces 77, 95, and 96 and participated in shore bombardment, blockading, and patrol missions in Korean waters. During this period Rogers also served as "lifeguard" destroyer for two Presidents: for President Truman's flight to Wake Island for his conference with General Douglas MacArthur in 1950 and for President-elect Eisenhower on his return from the Far East in 1952.

=== WestPac deployments, 1953–1962 ===
After fighting stopped in Korea, Rogers alternated west coast tours with WestPac deployment. In 1954, she helped in the evacuation of the Tachen Islands.

By 1960 Rogers had made over a dozen six to nine-month cruises to the Far East. After 1st Fleet operations off the west coast, Rogers again deployed in January 1962 to WestPac where she operated with carrier groups, on Formosa patrol, and participated in a major allied amphibious exercise. Rogers returned to the 1st Fleet and on the evening of 12 November, successfully recovered a pilot from the aircraft carrier Ticonderoga, who had ejected from his aircraft into a dense fog off the coast of southern California.

=== Vietnam, 1963–1969 ===
In June 1963, after 18 years in the Pacific, Rogers departed San Diego for the east coast and FRAM I modernization at Charleston, South Carolina. On 30 July 1963 she was reclassified from DDR-876 to DD-876. In May 1964 she returned to the Pacific Fleet. During the summer of 1965, Rogers visited San Francisco, Puget Sound, and Hawaii as part of the Pacific Midshipman Training Squadron. One year later she was operating off Vietnam in the Tonkin Gulf serving on Search and Rescue and shore bombardment missions from August 1966, returning to San Diego in August 1967, she operated with the 1st Fleet off the west coast of the United States until deploying again to the western Pacific in September 1967. In mid-November, she was operating in the Gulf of Tonkin, and in April 1968 returned to San Diego, California.

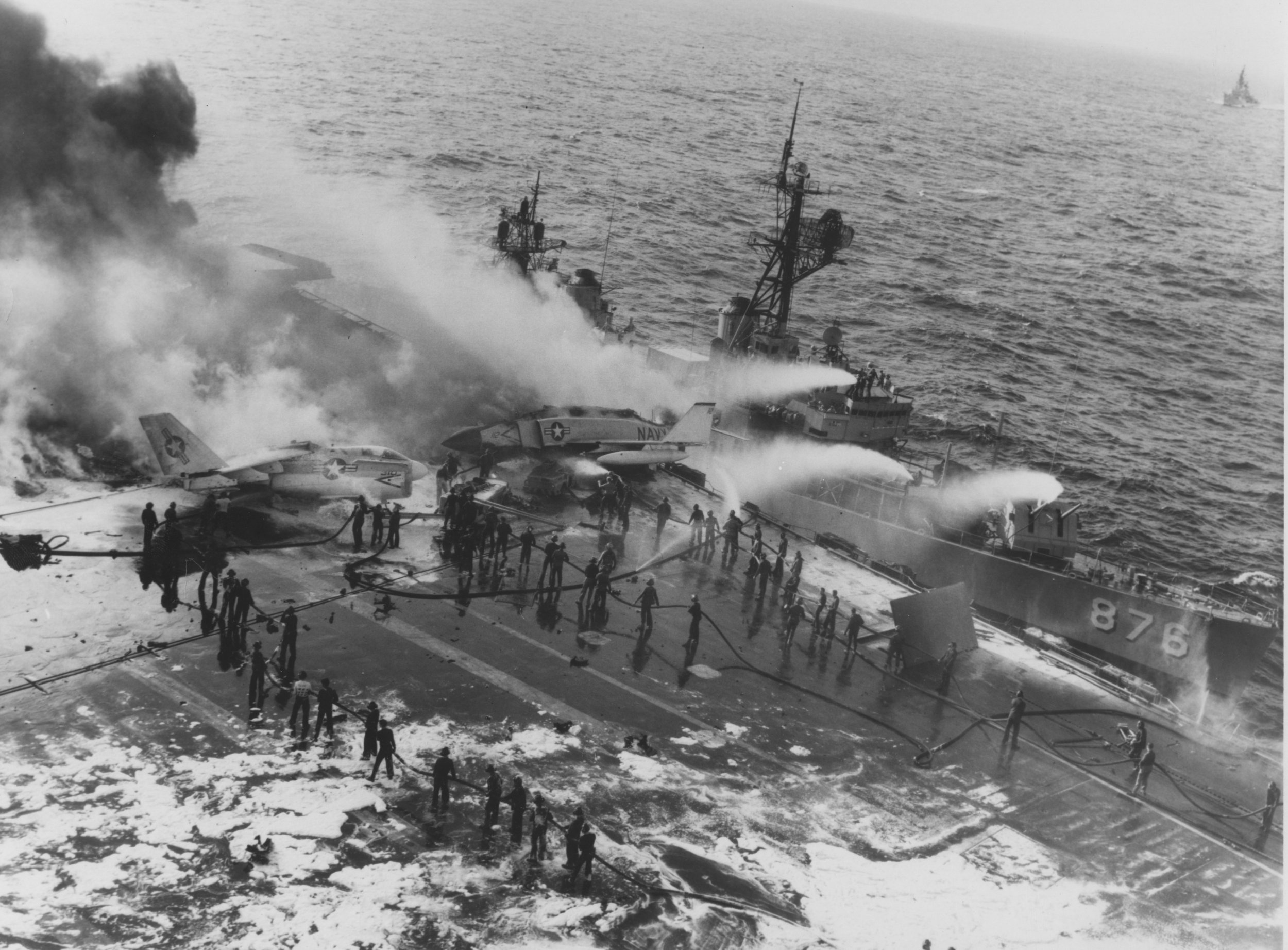
Rogers alongside the burning Enterprise in 1969

Again operating off the west coast of the United States for the balance of the year, Rogers deployed to the Far East in January 1969. En route she earned the Meritorious Unit Commendation for action in Hawaiian waters on 14 January coming alongside the port quarter of the aircraft carrier Enterprise with six fire hoses trained on the raging flight-deck fire while exposed to flying shrapnel from exploding bombs. After spending some of her time in the Far East off Vietnam, she returned to San Diego on 6 July. After a year of operations with the First Fleet, Rogers sailed from San Diego for another Far East cruise. Following five months of service in the western Pacific, she returned to San Diego on 16 December.

=== WestPac deployments, 1970–1974 ===
At the completion of another spring of west coast operations, Rogers headed back to WestPac, departing from San Diego on 29 June 1972. She returned to San Diego on 22 December and spent the next year on the Pacific coast of the United States engaged initially in normal operations. Later, in early April 1972, she entered Hunter's Point Naval Shipyard for regular overhaul. Overhaul was completed by 28 August and she left Hunter's Point for various trials and refresher training, which continued until mid-December. On 18 December, she sailed for Subic Bay, but had to return to San Diego three days later because of a medical emergency. She departed San Diego the same day, 21 December, and arrived in Subic Bay on 29 January 1973. Returning to San Diego on 12 June 1973, Rogers operated along the west coast into 1974. Rogers was on the gun-line again from January 1973 through April 1973 at the moment President Nixon declared cease fire. Rogers fired the last shot of the Vietnam War.

=== Reserve training, 1974–1980 ===
In 1974 she changed homeports to Swan Island in Portland, Oregon, and became part of Destroyer Squadron 37. Rogers was tasked with training U.S. Navy reserves in the Portland area. Rogers also made many trips to Seattle, San Francisco, Esquimalt Harbour, Nanoose Bay and San Diego to train US Navy Reservists. She performed these duties until 1980 when she was decommissioned and sold to South Korea the next year.

=== Decommissioning and transfer to Korea ===
Rogers was decommissioned on 19 February 1981 and was struck from the Navy List on 1 October 1980. Transferred to the Republic of Korea on 11 August 1981, the destroyer served as ROKS Jeonju (DD-925) until decommissioned on 31 December 1999. The destroyer is now a museum ship at Dangjin Marine Tourism Organization (Sapgyo Hamsang Park) in the city of Dangjin-Gun, Chung Nam Province.
