= Mato Grosso-class destroyer =

Class of destroyers of the Brazilian Navy

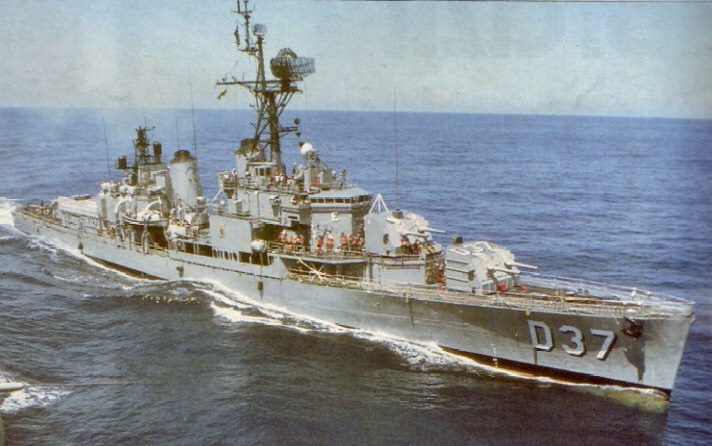
- Rio Grande do Norte

Class overview
- Name: Mato Grosso class
- Builders: Federal Shipbuilding and Drydock Company; Bethlehem Steel; Bethlehem Shipbuilding Corporation
- Operators: Brazilian Navy
- Preceded by: Pará class
- Succeeded by: Marcílio Dias class
- Built: 1943–1946
- In commission: 1972–1996
- Planned: 5
- Completed: 5
- Retired: 5

General characteristics
- Type: Destroyer
- Length: 376 ft 6 in (114.76 m)
- Beam: 40 ft (12 m)
- Draft: 15 ft 8 in (4.78 m)
- Propulsion: 60,000 shp (45,000 kW); 2 shafts
- Speed: 34 kn (63 km/h; 39 mph)
- Range: 6,500 nmi (12,000 km; 7,500 mi) at 15 kn (28 km/h; 17 mph)
- Complement: 331 (D34); 291 (D35-38)
- Sensors & processing systems: 1 × AN/SPS-29 air-search radar (D38); 1 × AN/SPS-6 air-search radar (D34); 1 × AN/SPS-40 air-search radar (D35-37); 1 × AN/SPS-10 surface-search radar; 1 × AN/SQS-44 sonar (D34 and 36-37); 1 × AN/SQS-29 sonar (D35 and 38); 1 × Mark 25 Director (D34); 1 × Mark 20 Director (D35-38)
- Electronic warfare & decoys: 1 × AN/WLR-1 ECM; 1 × AN/ULQ-6 ECM
- Armament: D34: 3 × twin 5"/38 cal guns; 2 × triple Mark 46 torpedo tubes; 2 × Mark 10 Hedgehog mortars; 1 × Seacat SAM; 1 × depth charge track; D35-38: 3 × twin 5"/38 cal guns; 2 × triple Mark 46 torpedo tubes; 2 × Mark 10 Hedgehog mortars
- Aircraft carried: 1 × Westland Wasp
- Aviation facilities: Single hangar and helipad (D35-38)

The Mato Grosso-class destroyer is a class of destroyers of the Brazilian Navy. Seven ships of the Allen M. Sumner class were lent by the United States Navy and were in commission from 1972 until 1996.

== Development ==
Mato Grosso was commissioned as USS Compton on 4 November 1944, Sergipe was commissioned as USS James C. Owens on 17 February 1945, Alagoas was commissioned as USS Buck on 28 June 1946, Rio Grande do Norte was commissioned as USS Strong on 8 March 1945 and Espírito Santo was commissioned as USS Lowry on 8 March 1945.

After World War II, they were in a mothball state, but were later handed over to Brazil based on the Brazil-US Ship Loan Agreement. Only the lead ship had not undergone FRAM, thus the ships having different armaments and configurations.

== Ships in the class ==
Mato Grosso class							
Hull no.	Name	Builder	Laid down	Launched	Acquired	Decommissioned	Fate
D34	Mato Grosso	Federal Shipbuilding and Drydock Company	28 March 1944	17 September 1944	27 September 1972	July 1990	Scrapped
D35	Sergipe	Bethlehem Shipbuilding Corporation	9 April 1944	1 October 1944	15 July 1973	17 October 1995	Scrapped
D36	Alagoas	Bethlehem Steel	1 February 1944	11 March 1945	16 July 1973	30 June 1995	Scrapped
D37	Rio Grande do Norte	Bethlehem Steel	25 July 1943	23 April 1944	31 October 1973	1995	Sunk in 1997
D38	Espírito Santo	Bethlehem Shipbuilding Corporation	1 August 1943	6 February 1944	31 October 1973	1996	Scrapped, 1996

== Bibliography ==
- Gardiner, Robert; Chumbley, Stephen; Budzbon, Przemysław (1995). Conway's All the World's Fighting Ships 1947-1995. Annapolis, Md.: Naval Institute Press. ISBN 1-55750-132-7. OCLC 34267261.
- Mooney, James (1959). Dictionary of American Naval Fighting Ships. p. 780. ISBN 9780160020308.
