= Seguí-class destroyer =

Class of destroyers of the Argentinian Navy

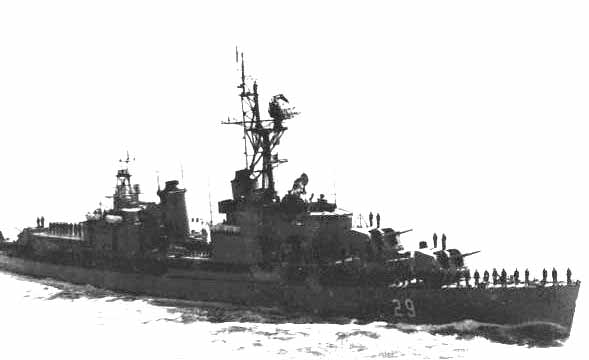
- ARA Piedra Buena

Class overview
- Name: Seguí class
- Builders: Bath Iron Works; Federal Shipbuilding and Drydock Company
- Operators: Argentine Navy
- Preceded by: Brown class
- Succeeded by: Py class
- Built: 1942-1943
- In commission: 1972-1985
- Planned: 3
- Completed: 3
- Retired: 3

General characteristics
- Type: Destroyer
- Length: 376 ft 6 in (114.76 m)
- Beam: 40 ft (12 m)
- Draft: 15 ft 8 in (4.78 m)
- Propulsion: 60,000 shp (45,000 kW); 2 shafts
- Speed: 34 kn (63 km/h; 39 mph)
- Range: 6,500 nmi (12,000 km; 7,500 mi) at 15 kn (28 km/h; 17 mph)
- Complement: 331 (Seguí); 291 (Bouchard and Piedra Buena)
- Sensors & processing systems: 1 × AN/SPS-6 air-search radar; 1 × AN/SPS-10 surface-search radar; 1 × AN/SQS-30 sonar; 1 × Mark 25 Director
- Armament: Seguí: 3 × twin 5"/38 cal guns; 2 × twin 3"/50 cal guns; 2 × triple Mark 46 torpedo tubes (later removed); 2 × Mark 10 Hedgehog mortars; 1 × depth charge track; 4 × MM38 Exocet SSM missiles (1977); Bouchard and Piedra Buena: 2 × twin 5"/38 cal guns; 2 × triple Mark 46 torpedo tubes (later removed); 3 × twin 3"/50 cal guns; 2 × Mark 10 Hedgehog mortars; 4 × MM38 Exocet SSM missiles (1978)
- Aircraft carried: 1 × Aérospatiale Alouette III
- Aviation facilities: Single hangar and helipad (Bouchard and Piedra Buena)

The Seguí-class destroyer is a class of destroyers of the Argentine Navy. Four ships of the Allen M. Sumner class were lent by the United States Navy and were in commission from 1972 until 1984.

== Development ==
ARA Seguí was commissioned as USS Hank on 28 August 1944, ARA Hipólito Bouchard was commissioned as USS Borie on 21 September 1944 and ARA Piedra Buena was commissioned as USS Collett on 16 May 1944.

Seguí was the only one still in her Korean War configuration meanwhile, Bouchard and Piedra had FRAM configurations.

After World War II, they were in a mothball state, but on 1 July 1972 and 5 May 1977, they were handed over to Argentina based on the Argentina-US Ship Loan Agreement. All ships took on minor roles during the Falklands War. Bouchard and Piedra escorted the Belgrano in 1982 and were caught off guard by the submarine attack. They were dispatched to hunt for HMS Conqueror and made ASW grenade passes, but no contacts were made. Bouchard took a torpedo hit, the third Mk 8 torpedo launched on the Belgrano, but it failed to detonate.

USS Mansfield was also bought by the Argentina, but was never commissioned and used as spare parts for their current ships during that time.

== Ships in the class ==
Seguí class							
Hull no.	Name	Builder	Laid down	Launched	Acquired	Decommissioned	Fate
D-25	Seguí	Federal Shipbuilding and Drydock Company	17 January 1944	21 May 1944	1 July 1972	1983	Scrapped, 1983
D-26	Hipólito Bouchard	Federal Shipbuilding and Drydock Company	29 February 1944	4 July 1944	1 July 1972	1984	Scrapped, 1984
D-29	Piedra Buena	Bath Iron Works	11 October 1943	5 March 1944	17 May 1977	18 February 1985	Sunk as target, 1988

== Bibliography ==
- "Collett (DD-730)". Dictionary of American Naval Fighting Ships. Navy Department, Naval History and Heritage Command. 30 June 2015.
- Gardiner, Robert; Chumbley, Stephen & Budzbon, Przemysław, eds. (1995). Conway's All the World's Fighting Ships 1947–1995. Annapolis, Maryland: Naval Institute Press. ISBN 1-55750-132-7.
- Scheina, Robert L. & Smigelski, Adam (1995). "Argentina". In Chumbley, Stephen (ed.). Conway's All the World's Fighting Ships, 1947–1995 (revised ed.). Naval Institute Press. ISBN 1-55750-132-7.
