= USS Robert K. Huntington =

United States Navy destroyer 1944–1981

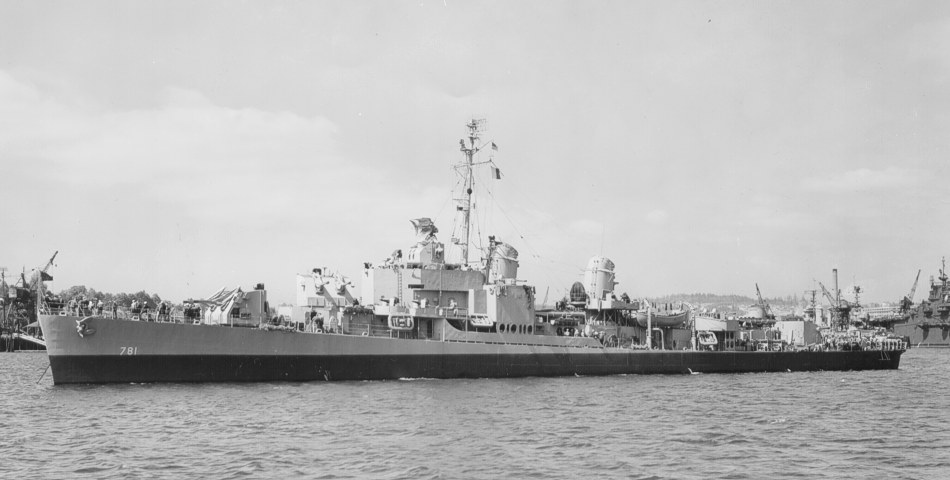
- USS Robert K. Huntington

History

United States
- Name: Robert K. Huntington
- Namesake: Robert Kingsbury Huntington
- Builder: Todd Pacific Shipyards, Seattle
- Laid down: 29 February 1944
- Launched: 5 December 1944
- Commissioned: 3 March 1945
- Decommissioned: 31 October 1973
- Stricken: 31 October 1973
- Fate: to Venezuelan Navy 31 October 1973

Venezuela
- Name: Falcon
- Acquired: 31 October 1973
- Stricken: 1981
- Fate: Scrapped in 1981

General characteristics
- Class & type: Allen M. Sumner-class destroyer
- Displacement: 2,200 tons
- Length: 376 ft 6 in (114.76 m)
- Beam: 40 ft (12 m)
- Draft: 15 ft 8 in (4.78 m)
- Propulsion: 60,000 shp (45,000 kW); 2 propellers
- Speed: 34 knots (63 km/h; 39 mph)
- Range: 6,500 nmi (12,000 km; 7,500 mi) at 15 kn (28 km/h; 17 mph)
- Complement: 336
- Armament: 6 × 5 in (127 mm)/38 cal. guns; 12 × 40 mm guns; 11 × 20 mm cannons; 10 × 21 inch (533 mm) torpedo tubes; 2 × depth charge tracks; 6 × depth charge projectors

USS Robert K. Huntington (DD-781) was an Allen M. Sumner-class destroyer. It is the only ship of the United States Navy to have been named for Robert Kingsbury Huntington, a naval aviator and member of Torpedo Squadron 8. All but one of the thirty men assigned to the squadron were lost during the Battle of Midway.

== Namesake ==
Robert Kingsbury Huntington was born on 13 March 1921 in Los Angeles, California. He attended The Lakeside School in Seattle Washington in 1940 after transferring from Pasadena College. He enlisted in the United States Navy on 21 April 1941. He served on board USS Lexington and was rated aviation radioman third class before being transferred to Torpedo Squadron 8 on board USS Hornet. He served as rear gunner in George Gay's torpedo plane during an attack against Imperial Japanese Navy forces in the Battle of Midway on 4 June 1942. Flying without fighter support, Gay and Huntington pressed home their attack with utter disregard for their own personal safety, in the face of a tremendous antiaircraft barrage and overwhelming fighter opposition. Huntington was killed when his plane was shot down. He was posthumously awarded the Distinguished Flying Cross. However, Gay survived, becoming the sole member of the squadron to live through the battle.

== Construction and commissioning ==
Robert K. Huntington (DD-781) was laid down on 29 February 1944 by Todd Pacific Shipyards, Seattle, Washington and launched on 5 December 1944; sponsored by Mrs. Ruth Arnold Welsh. The ship was commissioned on 3 March 1945.

== History ==
Robert K. Huntington joined the Pacific Fleet 31 May 1945 and from 27 June to 16 August escorted ships between Eniwetok and Ulithi. On 28 August, she joined the Fast Carrier Task Force off the Japanese coast and was one of the ships which escorted battleship Missouri into Tokyo Bay to receive the official Japanese surrender. She then returned to San Diego, carrying 100 Marines home. In the spring of 1946, she returned to the Marshalls as a unit of TF 1 during Operation Crossroads, the first atomic bomb test at Bikini. In July, she witnessed the air burst from a considerable distance, and the more spectacular underwater blast from the comparatively close range of 10 miles.

Until early in 1949, Robert K. Huntington operated and trained off the west coast, in Hawaiian waters, and in Far Eastern waters with Task Force 38, the Pacific Mobile Striking Force. In April the destroyer was transferred to the Atlantic Fleet where she was assigned to a carrier task force, then undergoing extensive antisubmarine warfare training. She spent the following winter in Arctic waters; then in February 1950 headed for the Caribbean to participate in fleet exercises.

In December Robert K. Huntington deployed for the first time to the Mediterranean and duty with the 6th Fleet. In the spring she returned to Norfolk and for the next two years she alternated cold weather operations with Caribbean cruises; then from the spring of 1953 until the summer of 1955 rotated between duty in the Mediterranean and exercises with the 2nd Fleet off the U.S. east coast and in the Caribbean. In July 1955 she was in the North Atlantic guarding president Eisenhower's plane route as he traveled to and from the Geneva Conference.

Following a Caribbean cruise in the spring of 1956, Robert K. Huntington conducted a midshipman training cruise to Europe and the Caribbean. In 1957 she operated in the Caribbean and then in European waters for NATO exercises. In both 1958 and 1959, Robert K. Huntington made 6-month Mediterranean deployments, while she spent most of 1960 undergoing a fleet rehabilitation and modernization (FRAM) overhaul and conversion. Emerging from the shipyard, the "new" destroyer steamed to her new home port, Mayport, Florida and through 1961 operated off the U.S. east coast and in the Caribbean.

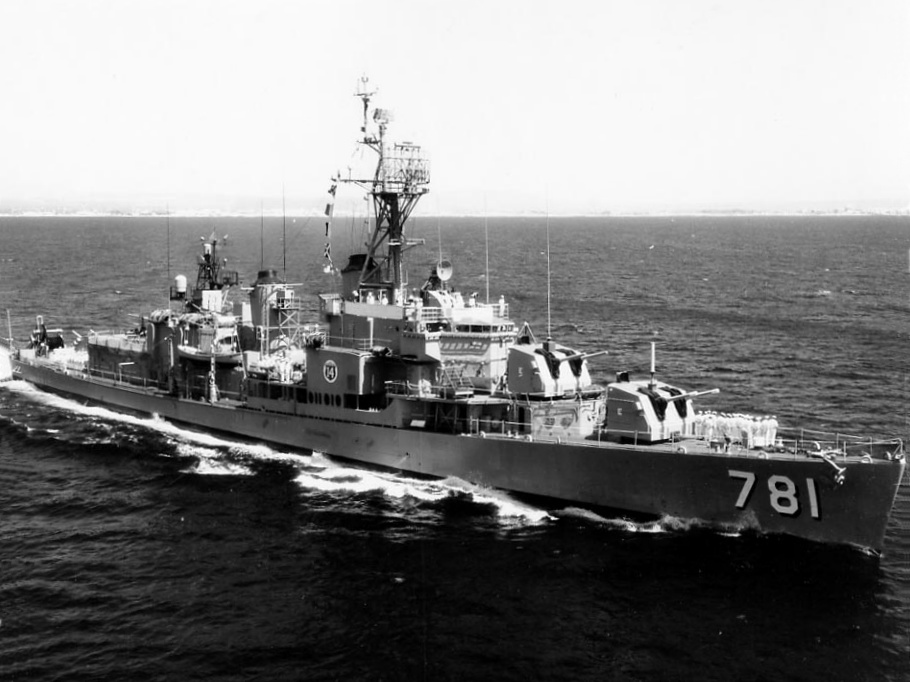
Robert K. Huntington underway after her FRAM II-modernisation.

Employed in ASW exercises off the east coast during the first half of 1962, Robert K. Huntington deployed to the Mediterranean 3 August, and operated in the Black Sea 3 to 12 October. She returned to Mayport 3 March 1963 and spent much of the rest of that year in the Caribbean. For the next 4 years she operated off the east coast, in the Caribbean, and in the Mediterranean. In late 1967, she deployed to the Mediterranean as part of a hunter-killer force. She returned to Mayport 16 December 1967.

In early 1968 Robert K. Huntington continued to operate off the east coast and in the Caribbean until transferring to the Pacific Fleet. In October she deployed to the Far East for six months, operating off Vietnam. She returned to Mayport on 17 April 1969 and remained in-port undergoing minor repairs until July 1969.

In July 1969, Robert K. Huntington received a new assignment and a new home port. Operating out of Bayonne, New Jersey she was active in the Atlantic and Caribbean with the Reserve program until October 1973. At that time, as a result of a survey, she was found to be unfit for further service and was decommissioned 31 October at Newport, Rhode Island Robert K. Huntington was stricken from the Navy List on the same day and sold to the Venezuelan Navy in which she was renamed Falcon.

Robert K. Huntington earned two battle stars for Vietnam service.
