= USS Blue (DD-744) =

Allen M. Sumner-class destroyer

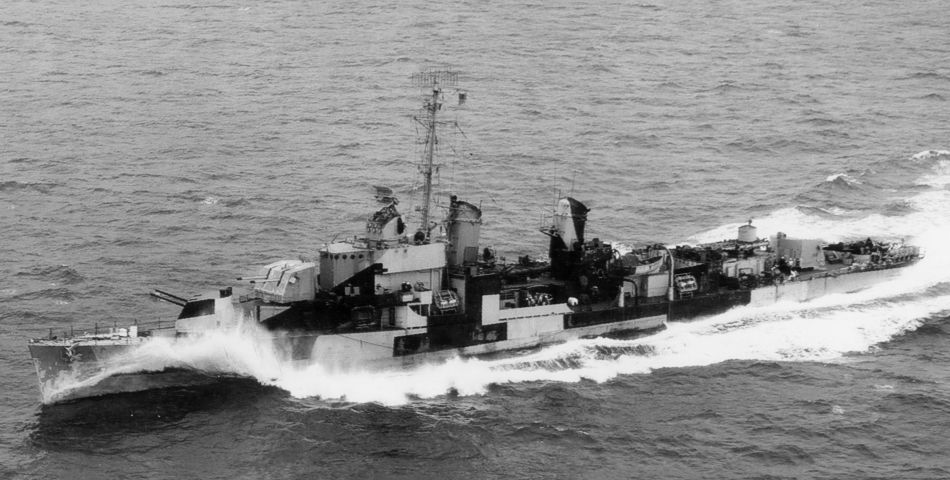
- USS Blue underway on 14 May 1944

History

United States
- Name: Blue
- Namesake: John S. Blue
- Builder: Bethlehem Mariners Harbor, Staten Island, New York
- Laid down: 30 June 1943
- Launched: 28 November 1943
- Commissioned: 20 March 1944
- Decommissioned: 27 January 1971
- Stricken: 1 February 1974
- Fate: Sunk as target off California 28 April 1977

General characteristics
- Class & type: Allen M. Sumner-class destroyer
- Displacement: 2,200 tons
- Length: 376 ft 6 in (114.76 m)
- Beam: 40 ft (12 m)
- Draft: 15 ft 8 in (4.78 m)
- Propulsion: 60,000 shp (45,000 kW); 2 propellers
- Speed: 34 knots (63 km/h; 39 mph)
- Range: 6,500 nmi (12,000 km; 7,500 mi) at 15 kn (28 km/h; 17 mph)
- Complement: 336
- Armament: 6 × 5 in (127 mm)/38 cal. guns, 12 × 40 mm AA guns, 11 × 20 mm AA guns, 10 × 21 inch (533 mm) torpedo tubes, 6 × depth charge projectors, 2 × depth charge tracks

USS Blue (DD-744), an Allen M. Sumner-class destroyer, was the second United States Navy ship of that name, for Lieutenant Commander John S. Blue (1902–1942).

== Namesake ==
John Stuart Blue was born on 29 August 1902 in New York City. He graduated from the United States Naval Academy in 1925. During 1933 he commanded the Presidential yacht Sequoia and served as Aide to President Franklin D. Roosevelt. Between August 1940 and January 1942 he commanded USS Palmer and then reported to the light cruiser USS Juneau as navigator. Lieutenant Commander Blue was killed in action on 13 November 1942 when Juneau was sunk during the Naval Battle of Guadalcanal.

== Construction and commissioning ==
Blue was launched on 28 November 1943 by Bethlehem Steel, Staten Island, New York; co-sponsored by Mrs. J. S. Blue and Miss Eleanor Stuart Blue, widow and daughter, respectively, of Lieutenant Commander Blue; and commissioned on 20 March 1944.

== Service history ==
=== World War II ===
Blue reported to the Pacific Fleet in July 1944 and joined TF 58 at Eniwetok Atoll, Marshall Islands. While screening the fast carrier task forces, Blue took part in:

- The Volcanos-Bonin-Yap raid (31 August – 9 September);
- capture of the southern Palaus (6 September – 14 October);
- Philippine Islands raids (9–24 September);
- Luzon raids (5–6, 13–14 and 18 November and 14–16 December);
- Formosa raids (3–4, 9, and 15 January 1945);
- Luzon raids (6–7 January);
- China coast raids (12–16 January);
- Honshū and the Nansei Shoto raids (15–26 February and 1 March);
- Iwo Jima assault (15 February – 4 March);
- Conquest of Okinawa (17 March – 6 June).

Blue was damaged by typhoon of 5 June off Okinawa, and retired to Leyte for repairs. Her repairs were completed in time for the destroyer to join the 3rd Fleet for its attacks against the Japanese home islands (10 July – 15 August).

On 27 August, Blue accepted the surrender of Japanese submarine I-400 off the coast of Honshū and brought her to just outside port where the USS Mansfield (DD-728) took custody.

Blue was one of the ships which escorted the battleship Missouri into Tokyo Bay 29 August for the signing of the Japanese Instrument of Surrender at Yokosuka Naval Base.

=== Post-War ===
After a short overnight stay, Blue then steamed to San Francisco arriving 5 October 1945, and shortly thereafter sailed to Puget Sound Navy Yard for complete overhaul.

Blue completed her overhaul in January 1946, and was assigned to Destroyer Division 92, 7th Fleet. On 10 February she departed the west coast for Asiatic waters, via Pearl Harbor, Guam, and the Philippines, and arrived on the China coast 13 May. During the remainder of the year, she cruised in the Yellow Sea, Philippine waters, and around the Marianas Islands engaged in tactical and hunter-killer anti-submarine warfare exercises and, performed patrol duty. She returned to the United States early in 1947 and on 14 February was placed out of commission in reserve at San Diego.

On 14 May 1949, Blue was recommissioned and assigned to Destroyer Division 72, Pacific Fleet. After undergoing overhaul at San Francisco Naval Shipyard between June and September, she returned to Pacific Reserve Fleet and was decommissioned at San Diego on 12 December 1949.

=== Korea ===
Blue was again placed in commission 15 September 1950 and reported to Destroyer Division 131, Pacific Fleet. After engaging in training exercises off the coast of California, she departed San Diego early in 1951 and arrived at Yokosuka, Japan, 23 January. She operated in Korean and Japanese waters until August. During this period she steamed with Task Force 77 (TF 77) off the east coast of Korea, carrying out screening, life guard, and fire support duties. Late in 1951 Blue proceeded to the United States for a general overhaul at San Francisco Naval Shipyard. She returned to the combat area in April 1952 and resumed operations with TF 77 off the coast of Korea. During September–October, with Task Group 95.20 (TG 95.20) and TF 76, she performed patrol duty and provided gunfire support during salvage operations.

Returning to the United States in November 1952, she underwent overhaul and engaged in scheduled exercises off the coast of California until June 1953. On 13 June, she departed Long Beach, California, and arrived at Yokosuka 7 July. On 17 July, she resumed screening operations with TF 77 off the east coast of Japan with TG 96.7 and patrolled off Formosa until 19 October, when she returned to Korea. She returned to the west coast in December 1953.

In 1954, the USS Blue took part in nuclear testing in the Bikini Atolls. Deck crews wore badges to measure the amounts of radiation due to underwater blast exposure.

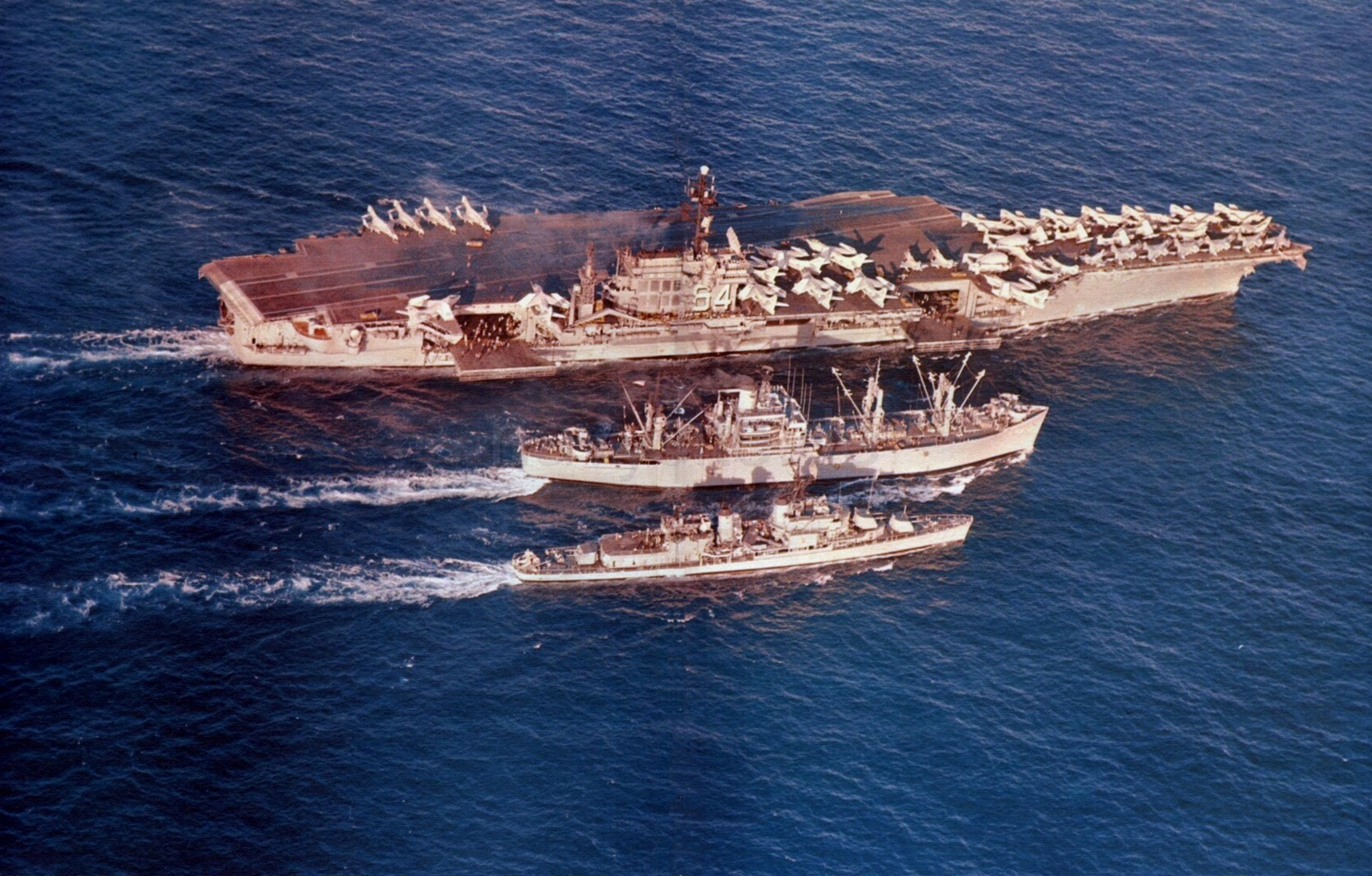
Blue after the FRAM II-refit during an underway replenishment with USS Constellation off Vietnam, 1964–65.

In 1960-61 Blue underwent the FRAM II-modernization. She received a flight deck aft for QH-50 DASH drones aft, new Mk 32 torpedo tubes were placed where the older 21" ones had been. Following underway training and exercises, she departed 6 January 1962 with DesDiv 92 for a prolonged stay in the Far East. Yokosuka, Japan, served as her new home port. Periods of patrol duty preceded and followed SEATO operation "Tulungan", the largest peacetime amphibious landing operation ever conducted in the western Pacific. During the next two years, the ship ranged widely over the Far East.

Since that time, Blue carried out the normal operating routine of the Pacific Fleet destroyers. She had conducted several tours of the Far East, and during the intervals between these cruises, she conducted local operations and type training along the west coast.

Blue was stricken 1 February 1974, and sunk as a target ship during a missile exercise off southern California on 28 April 1977.

== Awards ==
Blue received six battle stars for her World War II service and six for Korea.
