= USS Lofberg =

Allen M. Sumner-class destroyer

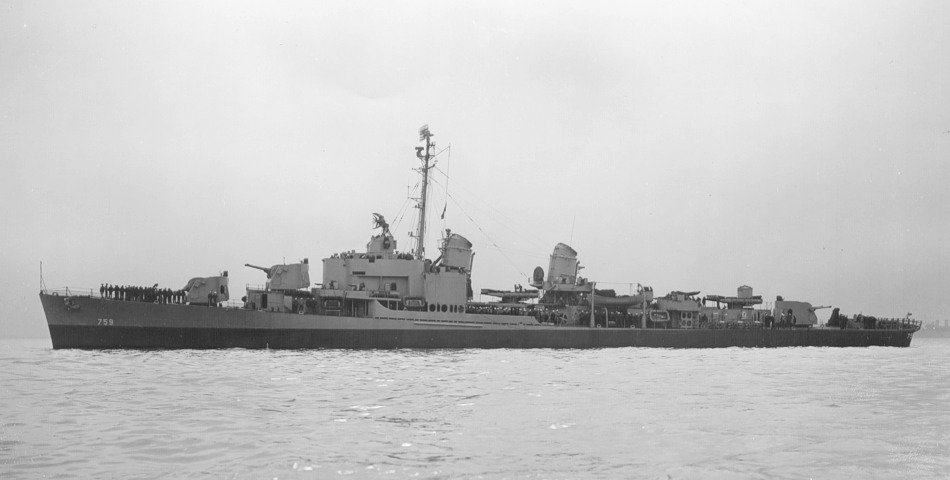
- USS Lofberg at San Francisco on 3 May 1945

History

United States
- Name: USS Lofberg
- Namesake: Gus Brynolf Lofberg, Jr.
- Builder: Bethlehem Steel, San Francisco
- Laid down: 4 November 1943
- Launched: 12 August 1944
- Commissioned: 26 April 1945
- Decommissioned: 15 January 1971
- Stricken: 1 February 1973
- Identification: DD-759
- Fate: To Taiwan 6 May 1974 and cannibalized for spare parts.

General characteristics
- Class & type: Allen M. Sumner-class destroyer
- Displacement: 2,200 tons
- Length: 376 ft 6 in (114.76 m)
- Beam: 40 ft (12 m)
- Draft: 15 ft 8 in (4.78 m)
- Propulsion: 60,000 shp (45,000 kW); 2 propellers
- Speed: 34 knots (63 km/h; 39 mph)
- Range: 6,500 nmi (12,000 km; 7,500 mi) at 15 kn (28 km/h; 17 mph)
- Complement: 336
- Armament: 6 × 5 in (127 mm)/38 cal. guns, 12 × 40 mm AA guns, 11 × 20 mm AA guns, 10 × 21 inch (533 mm) torpedo tubes, 6 × depth charge projectors, 2 × depth charge tracks

USS Lofberg (DD-759) was an Allen M. Sumner-class destroyer of the United States Navy, in service between 1945 and 1971.

== Construction and commissioning ==
Lofberg was laid down on 4 November 1943 by Bethlehem Steel Co., San Francisco, California and launched on 12 August 1944; sponsored by Mrs. G. B. Lofberg Jr., widow of Lieutenant Commander Lofberg. The ship was commissioned on 26 April 1945.

== Namesake ==
Gus Brynolf Lofberg Jr. was born on 6 April 1903 in Manitou, Michigan. He graduated from the United States Naval Academy on 2 June 1927. He served on board such ships as USS Concord, USS William B. Preston, USS Macleish, USS Arctic and USS California before receiving his first command, USS Little, on 27 February 1942. On the night of 4 September 1942 Little challenged a vastly superior Imperial Japanese Navy force then engaged in shelling American-held positions on Guadalcanal. Lofberg was listed as missing in action after Little was set afire and sunk. He was posthumously awarded the Silver Star.

== Service history ==
After shakedown, Lofberg departed the West Coast for the war zone. Since the formal surrender of Japan occurred almost six weeks before she arrived Tokyo Bay, 13 October, the destroyer was assigned to occupation duty. First came the clearing of mines from Japanese harbors, then a series of shuttle runs between Okinawa and Shanghai, and finally her return to San Francisco on 28 March 1946 with a group of Marines embarked at Tsingtao, China.

Lofberg was now temporarily assigned to the 3rd Reserve Fleet During the next year she restricted her sailing to short two-week coastal cruises to train Naval Reserves. On 1 July 1947 Lofberg resumed operations with the Pacific Fleet as flagship for DesRon 7.

=== Korean War ===
Three years later the outbreak of the Korean War tested the Navy's peacetime stress upon continuous training and physical readiness. On 30 September, under the command of Comdr. R. W. McElrath, Lofberg departed San Francisco on the first of three tours of duty in the new war zone. These operations extended over a three-year period.

Upon her initial arrival in Korean waters she became part of the screen for the fast carriers of Task Force (TF) 77. Planes from these carriers played an important part in successful evacuations in November and December of United Nations troops from North Korea in the wake of Chinese Communist intervention. Shifted temporarily to Task Group 96.8, she participated in gunfire support missions first off Korea's west coast and then in company with the battleship Missouri against targets along the eastern coast. As on her two succeeding tours she also took part both in the naval siege of Wonsan, Korea, and the preventive patrolling of the Formosa Straits before returning home on 2 July 1951.

Even after the Korean armistice of July 1953, Lofberg continued to make annual voyages to the Far East to participate in the activities and responsibilities of the 7th Fleet. By the beginning of 1960 she had lost her flagship status to a more modern-type destroyer. Though called upon as a part of the 1961 South China Sea buildup during a new Laotian crisis, this World War II vintage ship soon returned to San Francisco for a FRAM II rehabilitation and modernization.

=== New duties and the Vietnam War ===
Refurbished on 23 July 1962, Lofberg steamed forth to undergo a refresher training cruise and exercises designed to teach the effective use of her new helicopter flight deck. On 22 September she joined DesDiv 153, Pacific Fleet, for tactical training as part of an antisubmarine hunter group. The following 19 April, Lofberg departed the west coast to begin a new series of Far Eastern tours of duty. Lofberg completed her first assignment in time to spend Christmas 1963 at home, but her following voyage lasted from 23 October 1964 until 17 May 1965. To the familiar Formosa Strait patrol was added in February new duties off the coast of war ravaged South Vietnam. These duties included participation in the coastal barrier patrol initiated to prevent the infiltration of men and supplies from North Vietnam.

=== Lofberg's last years ===
Once home from the newest war zone, Lofberg underwent a three-month drydock period and in October commenced tactical exercises in the southern California operation area. The destroyer reentered the South China Sea 26 April 1966, and during the next six months served first on Yankee Station and then provided gunfire support to allied forces ashore. While assigned to the latter duties she participated in operation "Deck House 11".

Since that time, into 1969, Lofberg had continued to rotate duty with the 1st and 7th Fleets in the Pacific.

== Fate ==
Lofberg was decommissioned 15 January 1971, stricken 1 February 1973 and sold to Taiwan 6 May 1974 for spare parts.

Lofberg received seven battle stars for Korean service.
