= USS James C. Owens =

Allen M. Sumner-class destroyer

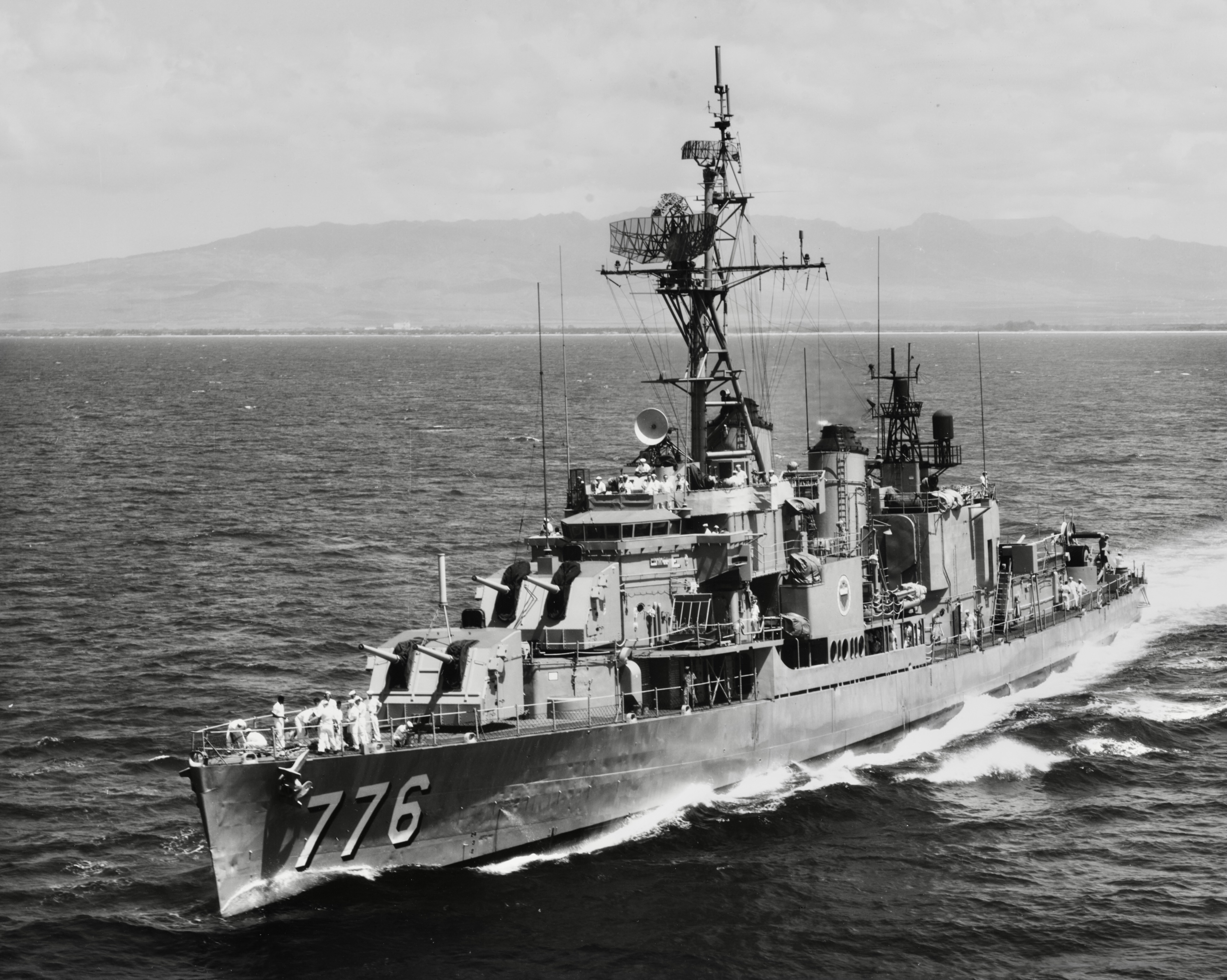
- USS James C. Owens

History

United States
- Name: James C. Owens
- Namesake: James C. Owens Jr.
- Builder: Bethlehem Shipbuilding, San Pedro
- Laid down: 9 April 1944
- Launched: 1 October 1944
- Commissioned: 17 February 1945
- Decommissioned: 15 July 1973
- Stricken: 15 July 1973
- Fate: To Brazil 15 July 1973

Brazil
- Name: Sergipe
- Acquired: 15 July 1973
- Stricken: 17 October 1995
- Fate: Scrapped

General characteristics
- Class & type: Allen M. Sumner-class destroyer
- Displacement: 2,200 tons
- Length: 376 ft 6 in (114.76 m)
- Beam: 40 ft (12 m)
- Draft: 15 ft 8 in (4.78 m)
- Propulsion: 60,000 shp (45,000 kW); 2 propellers
- Speed: 34 knots (63 km/h; 39 mph)
- Range: 6,500 nmi (12,000 km; 7,500 mi) at 15 kn (28 km/h; 17 mph)
- Complement: 336
- Armament: 6 × 5 in (127 mm)/38 cal. guns, 12 × 40 mm AA guns, 11 × 20 mm AA guns, 10 × 21 inch (533 mm) torpedo tubes, 6 × depth charge projectors, 2 × depth charge tracks

USS James C. Owens (DD-776), an Allen M. Sumner-class destroyer, is the only ship of the United States Navy FRAM II class to be named for Lieutenant James C. Owens Jr., a member of Torpedo Squadron 8 on board USS Hornet. His entire squadron was lost in an attack against Japanese aircraft carriers 4 June during the Battle of Midway. Lt. Owens received the Navy Cross and the Presidential Unit Citation (US) posthumously.

== Namesake ==
James C. Owens Jr. was born on 5 December 1910 in Batavia, New York. He was appointed Naval Aviation Cadet, USNR, on 3 September 1935. Following flight training at Pensacola, Florida, he served on board USS Lexington and on 1 September 1941, he joined Torpedo Squadron 8 (VT-8) on board USS Hornet. He was appointed Lieutenant 6 January 1942 and was the squadron Executive Officer.

On 4 June 1942 during the Battle of Midway he led the second division of Douglas TBD Devastator torpedo bombers when it pressed home an attack against Japanese carriers. Without the protection of fighters or accompanying dive bombers, the pilots exposed themselves to overwhelming firepower; and every plane of the squadron was shot down. By forcing the enemy ships to maneuver radically, thereby delaying Japanese preparations for a second strike. For his actions Owens received the Navy Cross and the Presidential Unit Citation (US) posthumously.

== Construction and commissioning ==
James C. Owens (DD-776) was laid down 9 April 1944, by the Bethlehem Shipbuilding, San Pedro, California and launched 1 October 1944; sponsored by Mrs. James C. Owens Jr., widow of Lt. Owens. The ship commissioned on 17 February 1945.

== Service history ==
=== World War II ===
After shakedown off southern California, James C. Owens departed San Pedro 10 May escorting the battleship California to Pearl Harbor, arriving on 16 May. She cleared Pearl Harbor on 24 May and sailed as convoy escort via Eniwetok and Ulithi to Okinawa. Arriving 17 June, she continued to Kerama Retto to join DesRon 24, which steamed on 24 June for Leyte, where it joined a cruiser-destroyer striking force. Sailing 13 July via Okinawa, the force entered the East China Sea 22 July to conduct antishipping sweeps. James C. Owens operated with the striking force for a month and then operated out of Okinawa until departing 20 September for Japan as part of the Wakayama Occupation Group. Arriving on 22 September, she supported occupation landings, patrolled off southern Japanese islands, and served as courier and escort ship. Steaming from Japan on 5 December, she reached San Diego on 22 December, departed for the East Coast on 3 January 1946, and arrived at New York on 15 January.

For more than 16 months, James C. Owens operated along the Atlantic Coast from New England to Texas. She conducted anti-submarine warfare (ASW) training out of Newport, Rhode Island; participated in destroyer maneuvers off the Florida coast; and served as escort and plane guard for the carrier Saipan in the Gulf of Mexico. Following operations out of Norfolk, Virginia, she departed Quonset Point, Rhode Island on 30 July 1947 with DesRon 2 for deployment with the 6th Fleet. She cruised the Mediterranean from Algeria to Italy and supported U. S. efforts to settle the unstable situation in Trieste before returning to the United States on 21 December. She returned to the Mediterranean in June 1948 and supported United Nations efforts to establish peace between Israeli and Arab forces. During this deployment, she patrolled the coast of Palestine, supported the evacuation of the U. N. Mediation Team in July, and helped to prevent the spread of conflict in the Middle East. Returning home early in October, she operated along the Atlantic coast until she decommissioned at Charleston, South Carolina on 3 April 1950.

=== Korean War ===
With the outbreak of war in Korea and increased tension in Europe and the Middle East, James C. Owens recommissioned on 20 September 1950 and commenced readiness and antisubmarine training operations. Departing for the Far East on 22 January 1952, she arrived in the Western Pacific on 27 February for blockade and interdiction patrols along the Korean coast. While operating off Songjin 7 May, she engaged enemy shore batteries and silenced several of them, but sustained six direct hits. Departing Korea 22 June, she steamed via the Indian Ocean and Mediterranean to Norfolk arriving on 19 August. She returned to Korean waters on 10 November 1953, and patrolled coastal waters to prevent violations of the armistice signed on 27 July. She remained on this important peace-keeping duty in the Far East until she departed Yokosuka, Japan, 11 March 1954. Steaming via Midway, the West Coast and the Panama Canal, she arrived Norfolk 1 May.

For almost two years James C. Owens operated out of Norfolk and Guantanamo Bay on ASW and destroyer division maneuvers. While in the Caribbean during September 1955, she provided search and rescue assistance to the citizens of Puerto Rico after a destructive hurricane. In April 1956 she sailed with DesDiv 221 via Northern Europe for the Middle East to operate in the Mediterranean, Red Sea, and Persian Gulf. During the Suez Crisis she transited the Canal to demonstrate American interest in a peaceful solution of the crisis. Returning to Norfolk in October, she again deployed to the Mediterranean 28 February 1957 to support the 6th Fleet in the Middle East; then she returned to Norfolk on 7 May. On 3 September she sailed to the North Atlantic for the NATO Operation Strikeback; after coastal operations for eight months, she deployed 6 June 1958, on a midshipman cruise to northern Europe. Following fleet and NATO operations, she returned to Norfolk 4 August.

James C. Owens deployed on her fifth cruise to the Mediterranean and Middle East on 7 August 1959. She ranged the Mediterranean from Italy to Lebanon and transited Suez on 14 October for two months of patrol and convoy escort exercises in the Red Sea and Persian Gulf. Returning to the Mediterranean 15 December, she operated with the 6th Fleet for two months; then sailed for Norfolk, arriving 3 March 1960. During September she joined NATO forces in the North Atlantic for Operation "Swordthrust," which stressed both offensive and defensive naval tactics of atomic warfare. In November she steamed to the Caribbean and patrolled the coasts of Nicaragua and Guatemala to intercept Cuban arms bound for Castro-oriented rebels. Retiring to Norfolk 20 December, she departed for the Mediterranean 2 February 1961. Before returning to Norfolk 20 August, she operated with the 6th Fleet from Spain to Greece.

After joining the ASW Defense Force 25 September, James C. Owens steamed to Charleston 11 January 1962, for an 8-month FRAM II overhaul that readied her for a new role in the modern Navy. She resumed operations on 19 December with surveillance patrols off the Cuban coast, then returned to Charleston 4 January 1963, for fleet exercises. Departing 6 August with DesDiv 42 for the Mediterranean again she conducted ASW operations with the 6th Fleet from France to Cyprus. Returning to the United States 23 December, she received DASH facilities at Norfolk during February 1964. She continued her ASW operations during a midshipman cruise to the Mediterranean 11 June-3 September. During the remainder of 1964, James C. Owens maintained her peak efficiency and readiness in coastal operations with nuclear submarines.

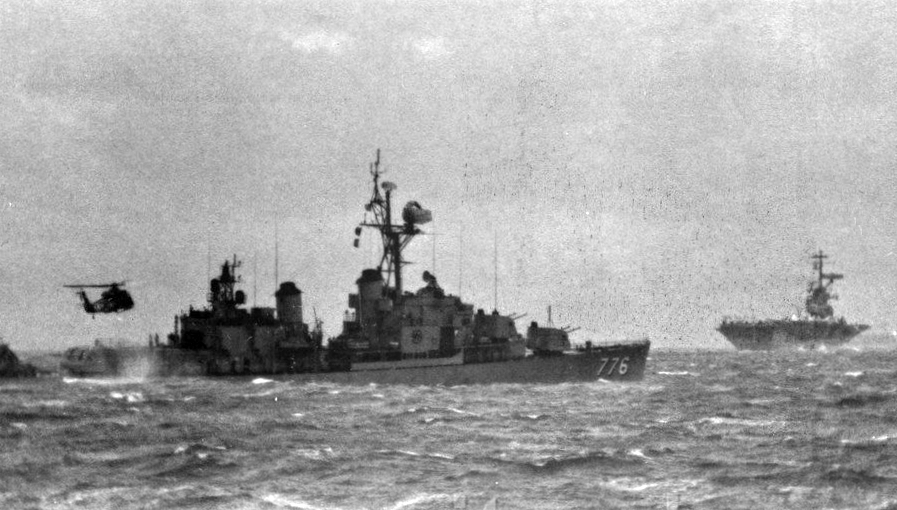
USS James C. Owens off Vietnam, in 1970.

The ship departed Charleston on 17 February 1965 for a Mediterranean cruise, and carried out advanced antisubmarine operations during her deployment.

After her returning to Charleston on 12 July, she was designated a recovery ship for the Gemini V orbital space mission. With the mission successfully completed, the ship returned to her home port 13 September. On 2 November she entered the Charleston Naval Shipyard for extended overhaul.

In March 1966 James C. Owens was back on the line at Guantanamo Bay. While there she rendered assistance to burning cruise ship, Viking Princess. After returning to Charleston for a brief visit, James C. Owens embarked midshipmen for their annual at-sea training. In late August she was assigned as the close-in recovery ship for the second in a series of Apollo unmanned space launches. In September the destroyer was deployed with the 6th Fleet; and, while operating in the Aegean Sea, she was ordered to the scene of sinking Greek ferry Heraklion, where she helped rescue the crew. James C. Owens returned to Charleston on 31 January 1967, where it was updated in preparation for service along the coast of Vietnam during 1968.

== Battle Stars ==
James C. Owens received two battle stars for World War II service and two for the Korean War.

== Brazilian service ==
The ship was acquired by Brazil in 1973 and renamed Sergipe. She was stricken in 1995
