= USS Hyman =

Allen M. Sumner-class destroyer

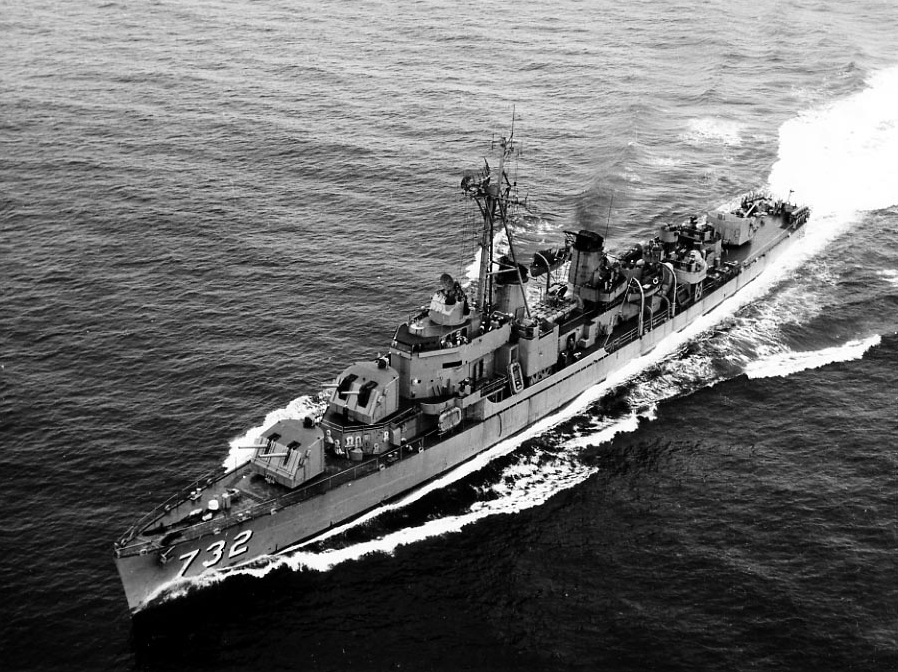
- USS Hyman (DD-732) underway in the early 1950s

History

United States
- Name: Hyman
- Namesake: Willford Milton Hyman
- Builder: Bath Iron Works
- Laid down: 22 November 1943
- Launched: 8 April 1944
- Commissioned: 16 June 1944
- Decommissioned: c.1969
- Stricken: 16 November 1969
- Fate: Sold 13 October 1970 and broken up for scrap

General characteristics
- Class & type: Allen M. Sumner-class destroyer
- Displacement: 2,200 tons
- Length: 376 ft 6 in (114.76 m)
- Beam: 40 ft (12 m)
- Draft: 15 ft 8 in (4.78 m)
- Propulsion: 60,000 shp (45,000 kW); 2 propellers
- Speed: 34 knots (63 km/h; 39 mph)
- Range: 6,500 nmi (12,000 km; 7,500 mi) at 15 kn (28 km/h; 17 mph)
- Complement: 336
- Armament: 6 × 5 in (127 mm)/38 cal. guns, 12 × 40 mm AA guns, 11 × 20 mm AA guns, 10 × 21 inch (533 mm) torpedo tubes, 6 × depth charge projectors, 2 × depth charge tracks

USS Hyman (DD-732), was an Allen M. Sumner-class destroyer of the United States Navy.

== Namesake ==
Willford Milton Hyman was born on 16 August 1901 in Pueblo, Colorado. He graduated from the United States Naval Academy in 1924. He first served on the battleship USS New Mexico and in the years before World War II, was assigned to many ships and a variety of shore stations, including the Office of Naval Operations. He assumed command of destroyer USS Sims on 6 October 1941. After convoy escort duty in the Atlantic, Sims moved to the Pacific in early 1942.

In May, as the Japanese attempted to extend their conquest to Port Moresby, the ship was operating with oiler USS Neosho in a fueling group for Admiral Frank Jack Fletcher's aircraft carriers. While the carrier fleets maneuvered for position, Japanese planes found Neosho and Sims in the Coral Sea; and, thinking they were carrier and escort, attacked in strength. After Lieutenant Commander Hyman fought his ship through 2 air raids, 36 Japanese planes attacked the 2 ships. Sims took three 500-lb. bomb hits in this third attack. From the time the first bomb that hit Sims had exploded to the time she was sunk was a total of 48 seconds, leaving only 13 survivors. Realizing that the destroyer was damaged beyond repair, Hyman ordered "abandon ship" but remained on the bridge, directing the evacuation until going down with his ship. The sacrifice of his ship and Neosho had much to do with saving the Navy's carriers in the widely separated engagements known as the Battle of the Coral Sea. He was posthumously awarded the Navy Cross.

== Construction and commissioning ==
Hyman was laid down by Bath Iron Works, Bath, Maine on 22 November 1943, was launched on 8 April 1944 and commissioned on 16 June 1944.

== Service history ==
=== World War II ===
Hyman conducted exhaustive shakedown training off Bermuda and in Casco Bay, Maine, before sailing from Boston 18 September to join the Pacific war. She steamed via the Panama Canal Zone and San Diego to Pearl Harbor 12 October 1944. During the next few months she was occupied with training exercises, including practice amphibious assaults, and escort voyages to the advance base at Eniwetok.

As the amphibious pincers, one reaching across Micronesia and the other pushing through the Philippines, closed on Japan in early 1945, the island of Iwo Jima became a prime objective. Hyman sailed 27 January 1945, with the transports of Kelly Turner's expeditionary force, touching at Eniwetok before carrying out on Saipan a final rehearsal of the Iwo Jima landing. On the morning of 19 February, the destroyer formed part of the screen for the transports; and, as the first wave landed, she turned her 5-inch guns shoreward and opened fire to provide support for the assaulting troops. She bombarded Japanese troops and bunkers until 23 February, when she made an antisubmarine sweep south of Iwo Jima. The next day, after returning to gunfire support station, Hyman fought off an air attack. Fire support, duties continued until the destroyer sailed for Leyte Gulf on 2 March 1945. There she took part in practice bombardments for the upcoming invasion of Okinawa.

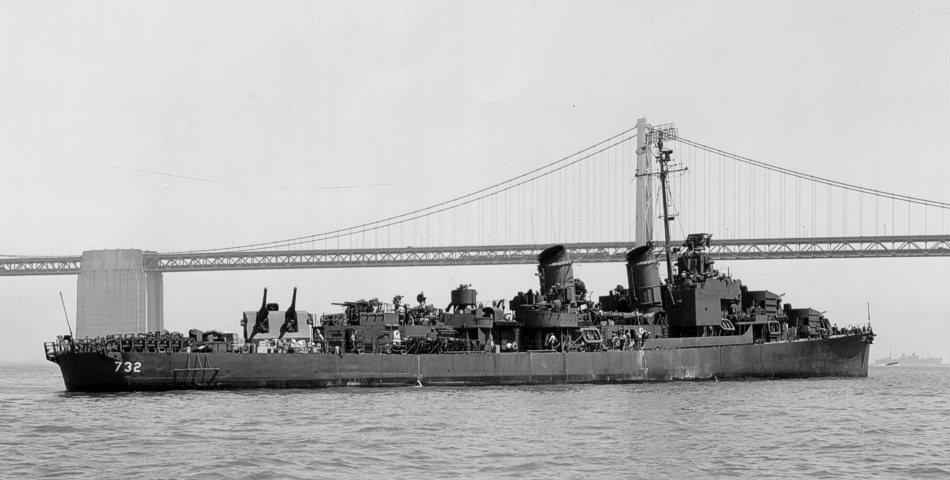
USS Hyman in San Francisco Bay, 20 July 1945.

Hyman sailed with Admiral Hall's Southern Attack Force 27 March 1945 and arrived Okinawa 1 April. As troops landed she took station off the transport area, protecting the American ships from enemy submarines and planes. In the following days she fought off several air attacks and on 5 April, led a search group hunting a reported midget submarine. Next day the ship was attacked in company with other picket and patrol ships west of Ie Shima as the Japanese made kamikaze attacks in hopes of stopping the landing. Shooting at attacking planes on all sides, Hyman downed several before a damaged aircraft crashed near her torpedo tubes, its engine exploding on the main deck. While fighting fire and flooding, Hyman helped down two more aircraft before the engagement ended, leaving twelve of her men killed and over forty wounded.

After emergency repairs at Kerama Retto on 7 April, the ship arrived at Saipan eleven days later. From there she steamed on one engine to San Francisco, arriving on 16 May 1945. The destroyer was ready for sea again in late July 1945; and, after training exercises, sailed to Pearl Harbor, where she arrived the day of the Japanese surrender, 15 August. Hyman performed plane-guard duties in Hawaiian waters until arriving at Kwajalein on 5 September to assist in receiving the surrender of outlying Pacific islands. She received the surrender of Japanese forces on Kusaie on 8 September and Ponape 11 September. Captain Momm, division commander on Hyman, assumed duties as military governor of Ponape next day. The ship remained as station ship, assisting in the occupation and repatriation until arriving Eniwetok 26 December 1945. After exercises out of Yokosuka early in 1946, the ship sailed via California and the Canal Zone to Casco Bay, Maine, where she arrived 16 April 1946. Hyman took part in antisubmarine training operations in the Caribbean through the end of 1946.

Hyman sailed for her first deployment to the Mediterranean 2 February 1947. For the next year she operated in coastal waters, but sailed 13 September 1948 with a carrier and cruiser group for the Mediterranean. The ships supported the United Nations peace force in Palestine. After this cruise Hyman returned to Newport, Rhode Island on 23 January 1949.

=== Korea ===
Through 1949 and 1950 the destroyer was assigned to reserve training duty out of Algiers, Louisiana, and on this duty she steamed for 2-week periods. With the outbreak of the Korean War in June 1950, Hyman engaged in maneuvers and training in the Caribbean, ending her reserve duty in September. After another cruise to the Mediterranean from 6 March to 7 June 1951, she prepared for Korean duty, getting underway from Newport on 2 October 1951. Hyman steamed with her division via the Panama Canal, San Diego, and Hawaii, arriving at Yokosuka on 31 October.

With the ground war in Korea then in stalemate, fleet air power, and surface bombardment carried much of the fight to the enemy. Hyman arrived at Wonsan for shore bombardment on 6 November, remaining in the area until 19 November, when she moved farther out to sea as plane guard for Australian aircraft carrier Sydney. Returning to Wonsan Harbor the destroyer engaged in a gunnery duel with batteries on Kalmo Pando peninsula 24 November, sustaining minor shrapnel damage during the close-in exchange. She carried out search and rescue duties into December when she joined Task Force 77 in the Sea of Japan during interdiction strikes on North Korea. Hyman returned to Yokosuka on 22 February 1952 and soon afterward embarked on the long cruise home, completing her round the world voyage at Newport on 21 April after visiting Ceylon, Saudi Arabia, Italy, and France.

=== Cold War ===
The veteran ship sailed again for Mediterranean waters 7 January 1953. On this cruise she took part in joint operations with British and French ships, returning to her home port 24 May 1953. During 1954 and 1955 Hyman took part in antisubmarine operations in the Caribbean and Atlantic. In 1956 she cruised to the Caribbean with midshipmen on training operations, and participated in North Atlantic Treaty Organization maneuvers off the Virginia Capes in May. In June 1957 the ship was part of the International Naval Review at the Jamestown Festival, commemorating the 350th anniversary of the first permanent English settlement in the New World.

After another Midshipman cruise, Hyman sailed on 29 November 1957 for the Mediterranean, visiting various eastern Mediterranean ports with the 6th Fleet. She returned to the United States on 12 April 1958 and for the remainder of the year was occupied with NATO exercises in the North Atlantic and antisubmarine training. Operations in home waters continued until 4 August 1960, when Hyman again sailed for duty with the 6th Fleet. In April 1961 the ship steamed west of the Azores as a station ship in the United States' Project Mercury.

During 1962 the destroyer made another cruise to Mediterranean and Middle Eastern ports, operating with naval units from many navies. While Hyman was undergoing repairs in October, the introduction of offensive missiles into Cuba precipitated another Cold War crisis; and the ship steamed to join the quarantine just as it was lifted in late November.

Hyman sailed to Costa Rica in March 1963 in connection with President John F. Kennedy's visit to that Central American country; and, after antisubmarine exercises, proceeded to waters east of Cape Canaveral for another Project Mercury assignment. She acted as part of the recovery group on Major L. Gordon Cooper's successful orbital flight. During the remainder of the year the ship conducted training exercises in the Caribbean.

During 1964 Hyman participated in ASW exercises and served as surveillance ship in Cuban waters. She entered Boston Naval Shipyard in April and departed for her eleventh deployment with the 6th Fleet on 27 November. Hyman returned to Newport on 13 March 1965 and received a new training assignment for Naval Reservists.

While conducting training exercises in mid-September 1965, Hyman was ordered to search for a chlorine barge lost in the Mississippi River during Hurricane Betsy. Although damaged by the same hurricane that sunk the barge, Hyman searched the Mississippi River for a week. Sonar sweeps and fathometer traces located the barge with its deadly gas near Baton Rouge, Louisiana on 17 September. Following this, Hyman went to Orange, Texas, for hull repairs. Training of Naval Reservists kept Hyman busy into 1967.
