= Allen M. Sumner-class destroyer =

Class of American destroyers

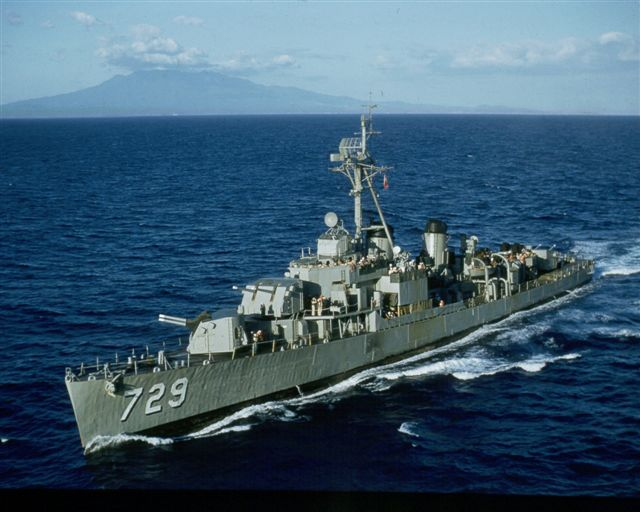
- USS Lyman K. Swenson in 1955

Class overview
- Name: Allen M. Sumner class
- Builders: Federal Shipbuilding, NJ (18); Bath Iron Works, ME (14); Bethlehem; Staten Island, NY (10); San Francisco, CA (6); San Pedro, CA (5); Todd Pacific Seattle, WA (5)
- Operators: United States Navy; Argentine Navy; Brazilian Navy; Chilean Navy; Republic of China Navy; Colombian National Navy; Hellenic Navy; Republic of Korea Navy; Turkish Navy; Imperial Iranian Navy; Islamic Republic of Iran Navy; Bolivarian Navy of Venezuela
- Preceded by: Fletcher class
- Succeeded by: Gearing class
- Subclasses: (United States) Robert H. Smith class; (South Korea) Daegu class; (Argentina) Seguí class; (Brazil) Mato Grosso class
- Cost: $8 million, excluding armament
- In service: 1943-2000
- In commission: 1943–75 (USN)
- Planned: 70
- Completed: 58
- Canceled: 12 (completed as Robert H. Smith class minelayers)
- Lost: 4, plus 2 not repaired
- Preserved: USS Laffey

General characteristics
- Type: Destroyer
- Displacement: 2,200–2,220 tons standard; 3,515 tons full load
- Length: 369 ft (112 m) waterline; 376 ft 6 in (114.76 m) overall; 376 ft (115 m) overall (DD 725–728 & 730–734)
- Beam: 41 ft (12.5 m); 40 ft (12 m) (DD 692–709); 40 ft 9 in (12.42 m) (DD 744); 41 ft 3 in (12.57 m) (DD 770–776)
- Draft: 15 ft 9 in (4.80 m) normal; 19 ft (5.8 m) full load; 18 ft 9 in (5.72 m) full load (DD 735-40 & 749–751 & 771–773)
- Propulsion: 4 Babcock & Wilcox or Foster Wheeler boilers; two General Electric or Westinghouse geared steam turbines, 60,000 shp (45 MW) total; two shafts
- Speed: 34 knots (63 km/h; 39 mph)
- Range: 6,000 nautical miles (11,000 km; 6,900 mi) at 15 knots (28 km/h; 17 mph); 503 tons oil fuel (except DD 692–709 500 tons, DD 735–740 515 tons)
- Complement: 336–363
- Sensors & processing systems: Mk37 GFCS; 1 × SC radar
- Armament: As built: 6 × 5 in/38 cal guns (127 mm) (in 3 × 2 Mk 38 DP mounts); 12 × 40 mm Bofors AA guns (2 × 4 & 2 × 2); 11 × 20 mm Oerlikon cannons; 2 × Depth charge racks; 6 × K-gun depth charge throwers; 10 × 21 in (533 mm) torpedo tubes; Typical by 1950: 6 × 5 in/38 cal guns (127 mm) (in 3 × 2 Mk 38 DP mounts); 6 × 3 in/50 cal guns (76 mm) (2 × 2, 2 × 1); 2 × Hedgehog ASW weapons; 1 × Depth charge rack; 6 × K-gun depth charge throwers; Typical after FRAM II: (1960–65); 6 × 5 in/38 cal guns (127 mm) (in 3 × 2 Mk 38 DP mounts); 2 × triple Mark 32 torpedo tubes for Mark 44 torpedoes; 2 × single 21-inch (533 mm) torpedo tubes for Mark 37 torpedoes; 1 × Drone Anti-Submarine Helicopter (DASH); Variable Depth Sonar (VDS)

The Allen M. Sumner class was a group of 58 destroyers built by the United States during World War II. Another twelve ships were completed as destroyer minelayers. The class was named for Allen Melancthon Sumner, an officer in the United States Marine Corps. Often referred to as simply the Sumner, this class was distinguished from the previous Fletcher class by their twin 5-inch/38 caliber gun mounts, dual rudders, additional anti-aircraft weapons, and many other advancements. The Allen M. Sumner design was extended 14 feet (4.3 m) amidships to become the Gearing class, which was produced in larger numbers but did not see significant service in World War II.

Completed in 1943–45, four Sumners were lost in the war and two were damaged so badly they were scrapped, but the surviving ships served in the US Navy into the 1970s. After being retired from the US fleet, 29 of them were sold to other navies, where they served many more years. One still exists as a museum ship in South Carolina.

== Description ==
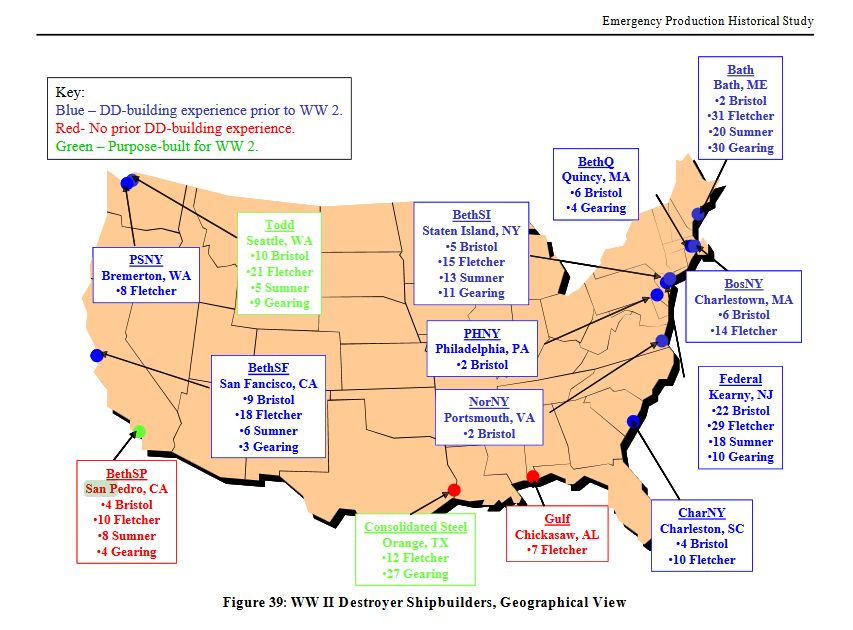
World War II Destroyer Shipbuilders map from Department of Defense (DoD)

The first ship was laid down in May 1943, while the last was launched in April 1945. In that time, the United States produced 58 Allen M. Sumner-class destroyers. The Allen M. Sumner class was an improvement of the previous Fletcher class, which were built from 1941 until 1944. In addition to three twin 5-inch/38 caliber gun mounts replacing the Fletchers' five single mounts, the Sumners had twin rudders, giving them better maneuverability for ASW work when compared to the Fletchers. The 5-inch guns were guided by a Mark 37 Gun Fire Control System with a Mark 25 fire control radar linked by a Mark 1A Fire Control Computer stabilized by a Mark 6 8,500 rpm gyro. This fire control system provided effective long-range anti-aircraft (AA) or anti-surface fire. The Allen M. Sumners also had larger set of short-range anti-aircraft armament than the Fletchers, with 12 40 mm guns and 11 20 mm guns compared with the 10 40 mm and 7 20 mm complement typical of a late-war standard Fletcher. The initial design retained the Fletchers' heavy torpedo armament of 10 21-inch (533 mm) tubes in two quintuple mounts, firing the Mark 15 torpedo. As the threat from kamikaze aircraft mounted in 1945, and with few remaining Japanese warships to use torpedoes on, most of the class had the aft quintuple 21-inch torpedo tube mount replaced by an additional 40 mm quadruple mount for 16 total 40 mm guns.

The Allen M. Sumners achieved a 20% increase in 5-inch gun armament and almost a 50% increase in light AA armament on a hull the same length as a Fletcher, only 15 inches (38 cm) wider, and about 15 inches (38 cm) deeper in draft. The increase in standard displacement was only 150 tons, about 7.5%. Thus, the Allen M. Sumner class was a significant improvement in combat power at a small increase in cost.

See also the Robert H. Smith-class destroyer minelayer (DM), twelve of which were built on hulls originally intended as Allen M. Sumners. The Gearing-class destroyers were of the same design, modified with a 14-foot (4.3 m) midship extension to carry more fuel to extend the ships' range.

== Service ==
The Allen M. Sumners served on radar picket stations in the Battle of Okinawa, as well as other duties, and had several losses. Cooper, Meredith, Mannert L. Abele, and Drexler were lost during the war, and Hugh W. Hadley was so badly damaged by a kamikaze attack that she was scrapped soon after the war ended. In addition, Frank E. Evans was split in half in a collision with the aircraft carrier HMAS Melbourne, and never repaired. After the war most of the class (except some of the light minelayers) had their 40 mm and 20 mm guns replaced by up to six 3-inch/50 caliber guns (76 mm), and the pole mast was replaced by a tripod to carry a new, heavier radar. On most ships one depth charge rack was removed and two Hedgehog mounts added. One of the two quintuple 21-inch (533 mm) torpedo tube mountings had already been removed on most to make way for a quadruple 40 mm gun mounting and additional radar for the radar picket mission. 33 ships were converted under the Fleet Rehabilitation and Modernization II (FRAM II) program 1960–65, but not as extensively as the Gearings. Typically, FRAM Allen M. Sumners retained all three 5-inch/38 twin mounts and received the Drone Anti-Submarine Helicopter (DASH), two triple Mark 32 torpedo tubes for the Mark 44 torpedo, and two new single 21-inch torpedo tubes for the Mark 37 torpedo, with all 3-inch and lighter guns, previous ASW armament, and 21-inch torpedo tubes being removed. Variable Depth Sonar (VDS) was also fitted; however, ASROC was not fitted. Ships that did not receive FRAM were typically upgraded with Mk 32 triple torpedo tubes in exchange for the K-guns, but retained Hedgehog and one depth charge rack.

In Navy slang, the modified destroyers were called "FRAM cans", "can" being a contraction of "tin can", the slang term for a destroyer or destroyer escort.

Many Allen M. Sumners provided significant gunfire support in the Vietnam War. They also served as escorts for Carrier Battle Groups (Carrier Strike Groups from 2004) and Amphibious Ready Groups (Expeditionary Strike Groups from 2006). From 1965, some of the class were transferred to the Naval Reserve Force (NRF), with a partial active crew to train Naval reservists.

== Disposition ==
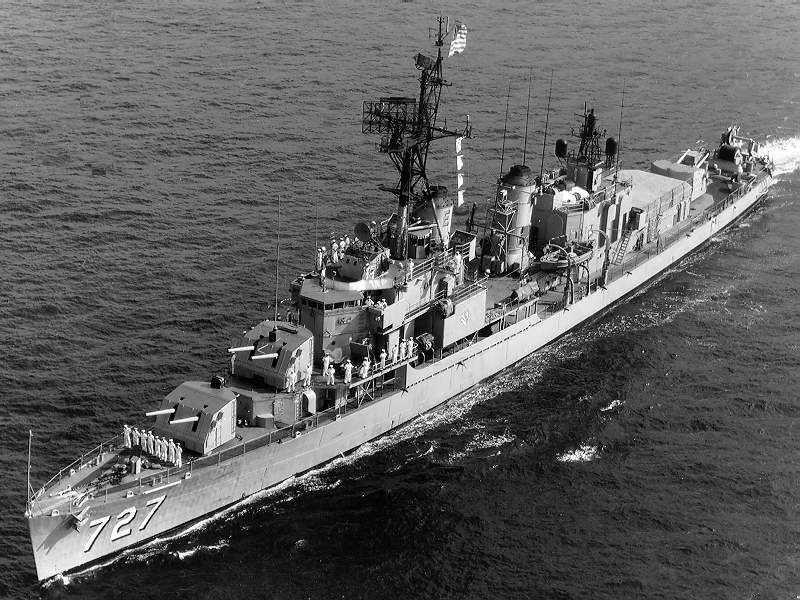
USS De Haven c.1970 fitted with FRAM II modifications.

The ships served in the US Navy into the 1970s. DASH was withdrawn from anti-submarine warfare (ASW) service in 1969 due to poor reliability. Lacking ASROC, the Allen M. Sumners were left without a standoff ASW capability and were decommissioned 1970–73, with most being transferred to foreign navies. The FRAM Sumners were effectively replaced as ASW ships by the Knox-class frigates (destroyer escorts prior to 1975), which were commissioned 1969–74 & carried a piloted helicopter, typically the Kaman SH-2 Seasprite & ASROC. After the Allen M. Sumners were retired from the US fleet, seven were sunk by the US in fleet training exercises and 13 were scrapped, while 29 were sold to other navies (two for spare parts) where they served for many more years. Twelve were sold to the Republic of China Navy, and two were sold to the Republic of Korea Navy. Two were sold to the Iran, and one was sold to Turkey. One was sold to Greece. Two were sold to Venezuela, two to Colombia, two to Chile, five to Brazil, and four to Argentina.

Currently, only USS Laffey (DD-724), located at Patriots Point, Charleston, South Carolina, remains, as a museum ship.

== Other navies ==
=== Argentina ===
The Argentine Navy acquired four Sumners as a more capable adjunct to their previously acquired Fletcher class destroyers. While one was merely to provide spare parts to keep the rest of the fleet serviceable, the other three would go on and serve through the Falklands War, in which they would take a minor role. Soon after the conflict, they were stricken and disposed of.

| Pennant | Ship name | Former name | Acquired | Fate |
|---|---|---|---|---|
| D-25 | ARA Segui | USS Hank | 1 July 1972 | Scrapped in 1983 |
| D-26 | ARA Hipólito Bouchard | USS Borie | 1 July 1972 | Scrapped in 1984 |
| D-29 | ARA Piedrabuena | USS Collett | 4 June 1974 | Sunk as a target in 1988 |
| —N/a | —N/a | USS Mansfield | 4 June 1974 | Not commissioned; cannibalized for spare parts |

== Ships in class ==
Ships of the Allen M. Sumner destroyer class
| Name | Hull no. | Builder | Laid down | Launched | Commissioned | Decommissioned | Fate | Ref |
|---|---|---|---|---|---|---|---|---|
| USS Allen M. Sumner | DD-692 | Federal Shipbuilding and Drydock Company | 7 July 1943 | 15 December 1943 | 26 January 1944 | 15 August 1973 | Disposed of, sold by Defense Reutilization and Marketing Service (DRMS) for scrapping externalities | |
| USS Moale | DD-693 | Federal Shipbuilding and Drydock Company | 5 August 1943 | 16 January 1944 | 28 February 1944 | 2 July 1973 | Disposed of, sold by Defense Reutilization and Marketing Service (DRMS) for scrapping | |
| USS Ingraham | DD-694 | Federal Shipbuilding and Drydock Company | 4 August 1943 | 16 January 1944 | 10 March 1944 | 15 June 1971 | Sold to Greece 16 July 1971 as Miaoulis | |
| USS Cooper | DD-695 | Federal Shipbuilding and Drydock Company | 30 August 1943 | 9 February 1944 | 27 March 1944 | —N/a | Torpedoed and sunk by destroyer Take while intercepting a Japanese convoy into Ormoc Bay 3 December 1944 | |
| USS English | DD-696 | Federal Shipbuilding and Drydock Company | 19 October 1943 | 27 February 1944 | 4 May 1944 | 15 May 1970 | Sold to Republic of China Navy 11 August 1970 as Huei Yang | |
| USS Charles S. Sperry | DD-697 | Federal Shipbuilding and Drydock Company | 19 October 1943 | 13 March 1944 | 17 May 1944 | 15 December 1973 | Sold to Chile 8 January 1974 as Ministro Zenteno | |
| USS Ault | DD-698 | Federal Shipbuilding and Drydock Company | 15 November 1943 | 26 March 1944 | 31 May 1944 | 16 July 1973 | Disposed of, sold by Defense Reutilization and Marketing Service (DRMS) for scrapping | |
| USS Waldron | DD-699 | Federal Shipbuilding and Drydock Company | 16 November 1943 | 26 March 1944 | 7 June 1944 | 17 May 1950 | Sold to Colombia 30 October 1973 as Santander (DD-03) | |
| USS Waldron | DD-699 | Federal Shipbuilding and Drydock Company | 16 November 1943 | 26 March 1944 | 20 November 1950 | 30 October 1973 | Sold to Colombia 30 October 1973 as Santander (DD-03) | |
| USS Haynsworth | DD-700 | Federal Shipbuilding and Drydock Company | 16 December 1943 | 15 April 1944 | 22 June 1944 | 30 January 1970 | Sold to Republic of China Navy 12 May 1970 as Yuen Yang | |
| USS Haynsworth | DD-700 | Federal Shipbuilding and Drydock Company | 16 December 1943 | 15 April 1944 | 22 September 1950 | 19 May 1950 | Sold to Republic of China Navy 12 May 1970 as Yuen Yang | |
| USS John W. Weeks | DD-701 | Federal Shipbuilding and Drydock Company | 17 January 1944 | 21 May 1944 | 21 July 1944 | 31 May 1950 | Disposed of in support of Fleet training exercise, 19 November 1970 | |
| USS John W. Weeks | DD-701 | Federal Shipbuilding and Drydock Company | 17 January 1944 | 21 May 1944 | 24 October 1950 | 12 August 1970 | Disposed of in support of Fleet training exercise, 19 November 1970 | |
| USS Hank | DD-702 | Federal Shipbuilding and Drydock Company | 17 January 1944 | 21 May 1944 | 28 August 1944 | 1 July 1972 | Sold to Argentina 1 July 1972 as Segui | |
| USS Wallace L. Lind | DD-703 | Federal Shipbuilding and Drydock Company | 14 February 1944 | 14 June 1944 | 8 September 1944 | 4 December 1973 | Sold to Republic of Korea Navy 4 December 1973 as Dae Gu | |
| USS Borie | DD-704 | Federal Shipbuilding and Drydock Company | 29 February 1944 | 4 July 1944 | 21 September 1944 | 1 July 1972 | Sold to Argentina 1 July 1972 as Hipólito Bouchard (D-26) | |
| USS Compton | DD-705 | Federal Shipbuilding and Drydock Company | 28 March 1944 | 17 September 1944 | 4 November 1944 | 17 September 1972 | Sold to Brazil 27 September 1972 as Mato Grosso | |
| USS Gainard | DD-706 | Federal Shipbuilding and Drydock Company | 29 March 1944 | 17 September 1944 | 23 November 1944 | 26 February 1971 | Disposed of, sold by Defense Reutilization and Marketing Service (DRMS) for scrapping | |
| USS Soley | DD-707 | Federal Shipbuilding and Drydock Company | 18 April 1944 | 8 September 1944 | 7 December 1944 | 13 February 1970 | Disposed of in support of Fleet training exercise | |
| USS Harlan R. Dickson | DD-708 | Federal Shipbuilding and Drydock Company | 23 May 1944 | 17 December 1944 | 17 February 1945 | 1 July 1972 | Disposed of, sold by Defense Reutilization and Marketing Service (DRMS) for scrapping, 4 January 1973 | |
| USS Hugh Purvis | DD-709 | Federal Shipbuilding and Drydock Company | 23 May 1944 | 17 December 1944 | 1 March 1945 | 15 June 1972 | Sold to Turkey 1 July 1972 as Zafer (F 253) | |
| USS Barton | DD-722 | Bath Iron Works, Bath, Maine | 24 May 1943 | 10 October 1943 | 30 December 1943 | 22 January 1947 | Disposed of in support of Fleet training exercise. | |
| USS Barton | DD-722 | Bath Iron Works, Bath, Maine | 24 May 1943 | 10 October 1943 | 11 April 1949 | 30 September 1968 | Disposed of in support of Fleet training exercise. | |
| USS Walke | DD-723 | Bath Iron Works, Bath, Maine | 7 June 1943 | 27 October 1943 | 21 January 1944 | 30 May 1947 | Disposed of, sold by Defense Reutilization and Marketing Service (DRMS) for scrapping, 3 January 1975 | |
| USS Walke | DD-723 | Bath Iron Works, Bath, Maine | 7 June 1943 | 27 October 1943 | 5 October 1950 | 30 November 1970 | Disposed of, sold by Defense Reutilization and Marketing Service (DRMS) for scrapping, 3 January 1975 | |
| USS Laffey | DD-724 | Bath Iron Works, Bath, Maine | 28 June 1943 | 21 November 1943 | 8 February 1944 | 30 June 1947 | Preserved as memorial and berthed at Patriot's Point, Charleston, South Carolina | |
| USS Laffey | DD-724 | Bath Iron Works, Bath, Maine | 28 June 1943 | 21 November 1943 | 26 January 1951 | 9 March 1975 | Preserved as memorial and berthed at Patriot's Point, Charleston, South Carolina | |
| USS O'Brien | DD-725 | Bath Iron Works, Bath, Maine | 12 July 1943 | 8 December 1943 | 25 February 1944 | 4 October 1947 | Disposed of in support of Fleet training exercise, 12 January 1972 | |
| USS O'Brien | DD-725 | Bath Iron Works, Bath, Maine | 12 July 1943 | 8 December 1943 | 5 October 1950 | 18 February 1972 | Disposed of in support of Fleet training exercise, 12 January 1972 | |
| USS Meredith | DD-726 | Bath Iron Works, Bath, Maine | 26 July 1943 | 21 December 1943 | 14 March 1944 | —N/a | Sunk 9 June 1944, Wreck sold and scrapped 5 August 1960 | |
| USS De Haven | DD-727 | Bath Iron Works, Bath, Maine | 9 August 1943 | 9 January 1944 | 31 March 1944 | 3 December 1973 | Sold to Republic of Korea Navy, 5 December 1973 as Incheon | |
| USS Mansfield | DD-728 | Bath Iron Works, Bath, Maine | 28 August 1943 | 29 January 1944 | 14 April 1944 | 4 February 1971 | Sold to Argentina 4 June 1974 for spare parts | |
| USS Lyman K. Swenson | DD-729 | Bath Iron Works, Bath, Maine | 11 September 1943 | 12 February 1944 | 2 May 1944 | 12 February 1971 | Sold to Republic of China Navy 6 May 1974 for spare parts | |
| USS Collett | DD-730 | Bath Iron Works, Bath, Maine | 11 October 1943 | 5 March 1944 | 16 May 1944 | 18 December 1970 | Sold to Argentina in 1974 as Piedra Buena (D-29) | |
| USS Maddox | DD-731 | Bath Iron Works, Bath, Maine | 28 October 1943 | 19 March 1944 | 2 June 1944 | 2 July 1972 | Sold to Republic of China Navy as Po Yang | |
| USS Hyman | DD-732 | Bath Iron Works, Bath, Maine | 22 November 1943 | 8 April 1944 | 16 June 1944 | 16 November 1969 | Disposed of, sold by Defense Reutilization and Marketing Service (DRMS) for scrapping | |
| USS Mannert L. Abele | DD-733 | Bath Iron Works, Bath, Maine | 9 December 1943 | 23 April 1944 | 4 July 1944 | —N/a | Sunk by an Ohka bomb during the battle for Okinawa 12 April 1945 | |
| USS Purdy | DD-734 | Bath Iron Works, Bath, Maine | 22 December 1943 | 7 May 1944 | 18 July 1944 | 2 July 1973 | Disposed of, sold by Defense Reutilization and Marketing Service (DRMS) for scrapping, 6 January 1974 | |
| USS Drexler | DD-741 | Bath Iron Works, Bath, Maine | 24 April 1944 | 3 September 1944 | 14 November 1944 | —N/a | Sunk by kamikaze 28 May 1945 | |
| USS Blue | DD-744 | Bethlehem Staten Island, Staten Island, New York | 30 June 1943 | 28 November 1943 | 20 March 1944 | 14 February 1947 | Disposed of in support of Fleet training exercise, 28 April 1977 | |
| USS Blue | DD-744 | Bethlehem Staten Island, Staten Island, New York | 30 June 1943 | 28 November 1943 | 14 May 1949 | 12 December 1949 | Disposed of in support of Fleet training exercise, 28 April 1977 | |
| USS Blue | DD-744 | Bethlehem Staten Island, Staten Island, New York | 30 June 1943 | 28 November 1943 | 15 September 1950 | 27 January 1971 | Disposed of in support of Fleet training exercise, 28 April 1977 | |
| USS Brush | DD-745 | Bethlehem Staten Island, Staten Island, New York | 30 July 1943 | 28 December 1943 | 17 April 1944 | 27 October 1969 | Sold to Republic of China Navy 9 December 1969 as Hsiang Yang | |
| USS Taussig | DD-746 | Bethlehem Staten Island, Staten Island, New York | 30 August 1943 | 25 January 1944 | 20 May 1944 | 1 December 1970 | Sold to Republic of China Navy as second Lo Yang (DDG-914). Sold as scrap in 2013. | |
| USS Samuel N. Moore | DD-747 | Bethlehem Staten Island, Staten Island, New York | 30 September 1943 | 23 February 1944 | 24 June 1944 | 24 October 1969 | Sold to Republic of China Navy 10 December 1969 as Heng Yang (DD-2) | |
| USS Harry E. Hubbard | DD-748 | Bethlehem Staten Island, Staten Island, New York | 30 October 1943 | 24 March 1944 | 22 July 1944 | 15 January 1947 | Disposed of, sold by Defense Reutilization and Marketing Service (DRMS) for scrapping | |
| USS Harry E. Hubbard | DD-748 | Bethlehem Staten Island, Staten Island, New York | 30 October 1943 | 24 March 1944 | 14 May 1949 | 12 December 1949 | Disposed of, sold by Defense Reutilization and Marketing Service (DRMS) for scrapping | |
| USS Harry E. Hubbard | DD-748 | Bethlehem Staten Island, Staten Island, New York | 30 October 1943 | 24 March 1944 | 27 October 1950 | 17 October 1969 | Disposed of, sold by Defense Reutilization and Marketing Service (DRMS) for scrapping | |
| USS Alfred A. Cunningham | DD-752 | Bethlehem Staten Island, Staten Island, New York | 23 February 1944 | 3 August 1944 | 23 November 1944 | August 1949 | Disposed of in support of Fleet training exercise, 10 January 1979 | |
| USS Alfred A. Cunningham | DD-752 | Bethlehem Staten Island, Staten Island, New York | 23 February 1944 | 3 August 1944 | 5 October 1950 | 24 February 1971 | Disposed of in support of Fleet training exercise, 10 January 1979 | |
| USS John R. Pierce | DD-753 | Bethlehem Staten Island, Staten Island, New York | 24 March 1944 | 1 September 1944 | 30 December 1944 | 1 May 1947 | Disposed of, sold by Defense Reutilization and Marketing Service (DRMS) for scrapping, 10 January 1974 | |
| USS John R. Pierce | DD-753 | Bethlehem Staten Island, Staten Island, New York | 24 March 1944 | 1 September 1944 | 11 April 1949 | 2 July 1973 | Disposed of, sold by Defense Reutilization and Marketing Service (DRMS) for scrapping, 10 January 1974 | |
| USS Frank E. Evans | DD-754 | Bethlehem Staten Island, Staten Island, New York | 21 April 1944 | 3 October 1944 | 3 February 1945 | 11 May 1949 | Disposed of in support of Fleet training exercise, 10 October 1969 | |
| USS Frank E. Evans | DD-754 | Bethlehem Staten Island, Staten Island, New York | 21 April 1944 | 3 October 1944 | 15 September 1950 | 1 July 1969 | Disposed of in support of Fleet training exercise, 10 October 1969 | |
| USS John A. Bole | DD-755 | Bethlehem Staten Island, Staten Island, New York | 20 May 1944 | 1 November 1944 | 3 March 1945 | 6 November 1970 | Sold to Republic of China Navy 6 May 1974 for spare parts | |
| USS Beatty | DD-756 | Bethlehem Staten Island, Staten Island, New York | 4 July 1944 | 30 November 1944 | 31 March 1945 | 14 July 1972 | Sold to Venezuela 14 July 1972 as Carabobo | |
| USS Putnam | DD-757 | Bethlehem Shipbuilding Corporation, San Francisco, California | 11 July 1943 | 26 March 1944 | 12 October 1944 | 6 January 1950 | Disposed of, sold by Defense Reutilization and Marketing Service (DRMS) for scrapping, 6 January 1974 | |
| USS Putnam | DD-757 | Bethlehem Shipbuilding Corporation, San Francisco, California | 11 July 1943 | 26 March 1944 | October 1950 | 6 August 1973 | Disposed of, sold by Defense Reutilization and Marketing Service (DRMS) for scrapping, 6 January 1974 | |
| USS Strong | DD-758 | Bethlehem Shipbuilding Corporation, San Francisco, California | 25 July 1943 | 23 April 1944 | 8 March 1945 | 9 May 1947 | Sold to Brazil, 31 October 1973, as Rio Grande do Norte (D-37) | |
| USS Strong | DD-758 | Bethlehem Shipbuilding Corporation, San Francisco, California | 25 July 1943 | 23 April 1944 | 14 May 1949 | 31 October 1973 | Sold to Brazil, 31 October 1973, as Rio Grande do Norte (D-37) | |
| USS Lofberg | DD-759 | Bethlehem Shipbuilding Corporation, San Francisco, California | 4 November 1943 | 12 August 1944 | 26 April 1945 | 15 January 1971 | Sold to Republic of China Navy 6 May 1974 for spare parts | |
| USS John W. Thomason | DD-760 | Bethlehem Shipbuilding Corporation, San Francisco, California | 21 November 1943 | 30 September 1944 | 11 October 1945 | 8 December 1970 | Sold to Republic of China Navy 6 May 1974 as Nan Yang | |
| USS Buck | DD-761 | Bethlehem Shipbuilding Corporation, San Francisco, California | 1 February 1944 | 11 March 1945 | 28 June 1946 | 15 July 1973 | Sold to Brazil 16 July 1973 as Alagoas | |
| USS Henley | DD-762 | Bethlehem Shipbuilding Corporation, San Francisco, California | 8 February 1944 | 8 April 1945 | 8 October 1946 | 1 March 1950 | Disposed of, sold by Defense Reutilization and Marketing Service (DRMS) for scrapping, 6 January 1974 | |
| USS Henley | DD-762 | Bethlehem Shipbuilding Corporation, San Francisco, California | 8 February 1944 | 8 April 1945 | 23 September 1950 | 1 July 1973 | Disposed of, sold by Defense Reutilization and Marketing Service (DRMS) for scrapping, 6 January 1974 | |
| USS Lowry | DD-770 | Bethlehem Shipbuilding, San Pedro, California, Terminal Island | 1 August 1943 | 6 February 1944 | 23 July 1944 | 30 June 1947 | Sold to Brazil 31 October 1973 as Espirito Santo | |
| USS Lowry | DD-770 | Bethlehem Shipbuilding, San Pedro, California, Terminal Island | 1 August 1943 | 6 February 1944 | 27 December 1950 | 29 October 1973 | Sold to Brazil 31 October 1973 as Espirito Santo | |
| USS Hugh W. Hadley | DD-774 | Bethlehem Shipbuilding, San Pedro, California, Terminal Island | 6 February 1944 | 16 July 1944 | 25 November 1944 | 15 December 1945 | Sold 2 September 1947 for scrap | |
| USS Willard Keith | DD-775 | Bethlehem Shipbuilding, San Pedro, California, Terminal Island | 5 March 1944 | 29 August 1944 | 27 December 1944 | 20 June 1947 | Sold to Colombia as Caldas (DD-02) | |
| USS Willard Keith | DD-775 | Bethlehem Shipbuilding, San Pedro, California, Terminal Island | 5 March 1944 | 29 August 1944 | 23 October 1950 | 1 July 1972 | Sold to Colombia as Caldas (DD-02) | |
| USS James C. Owens | DD-776 | Bethlehem Shipbuilding, San Pedro, California, Terminal Island | 9 April 1944 | 1 October 1944 | 17 February 1945 | 3 April 1950 | Sold to Brazil 15 July 1973 as Sergipe | |
| USS James C. Owens | DD-776 | Bethlehem Shipbuilding, San Pedro, California, Terminal Island | 9 April 1944 | 1 October 1944 | 20 September 1950 | 15 July 1973 | Sold to Brazil 15 July 1973 as Sergipe | |
| USS Zellars | DD-777 | Todd Pacific Shipyards, Seattle, Washington | 24 December 1943 | 19 July 1944 | 25 October 1944 | 19 March 1971 | Sold to Iran 12 October 1973 as Babr | |
| USS Massey | DD-778 | Todd Pacific Shipyards, Seattle, Washington | 14 January 1944 | 12 September 1944 | 24 November 1944 | 17 September 1973 | Disposed of, sold by Defense Reutilization and Marketing Service (DRMS) for scrapping, 10 January 1974 | |
| USS Douglas H. Fox | DD-779 | Todd Pacific Shipyards, Seattle, Washington | 31 January 1944 | 30 September 1944 | 26 December 1944 | 21 April 1950 | Sold to Chile 8 January 1974 Ministro Portales (DD-17) | |
| USS Douglas H. Fox | DD-779 | Todd Pacific Shipyards, Seattle, Washington | 31 January 1944 | 30 September 1944 | 15 November 1950 | 15 December 1973 | Sold to Chile 8 January 1974 Ministro Portales (DD-17) | |
| USS Stormes | DD-780 | Todd Pacific Shipyards, Seattle, Washington | 15 February 1944 | 4 November 1944 | 27 January 1945 | 5 December 1970 | Sold to Iran 16 February 1972 Palang (DDG-9) | |
| USS Robert K. Huntington | DD-781 | Todd Pacific Shipyards, Seattle, Washington | 29 February 1944 | 5 December 1944 | 3 March 1945 | 31 October 1973 | Sold to Venezuela as Falcon | |
| USS Bristol | DD-857 | Bethlehem Shipbuilding, San Pedro, California, Terminal Island | 5 May 1944 | 29 October 1944 | 17 March 1945 | 21 November 1969 | Sold to Republic of China Navy 9 December 1969 Hua Yang | |

== See also ==
- List of ship classes of the Second World War
