= USS Mansfield =

Allen M. Sumner-class destroyer

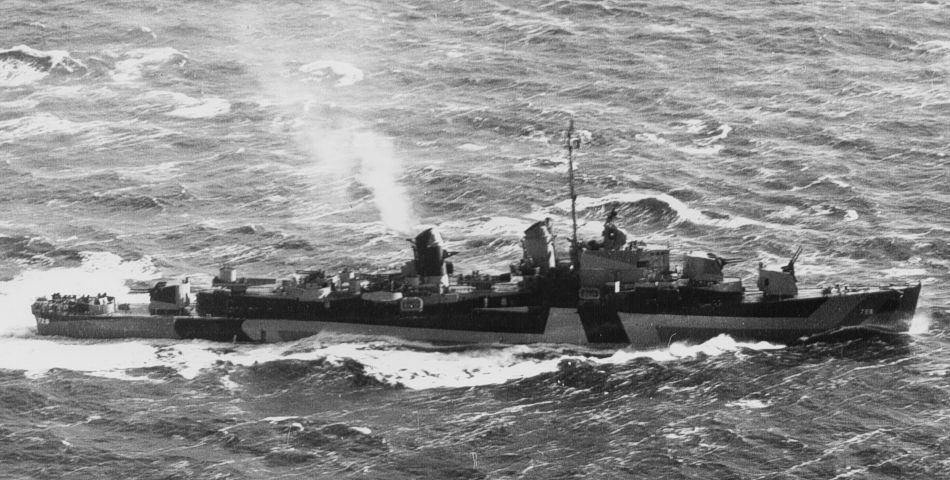
- USS Mansfield (DD-728), off Portland, Maine, 14 April 1944

History

United States
- Namesake: Duncan Mansfield
- Builder: Bath Iron Works
- Laid down: 28 August 1943
- Launched: 29 January 1944
- Commissioned: 14 April 1944
- Decommissioned: 4 February 1971
- Stricken: 1 February 1974
- Fate: Sold to Argentina 4 June 1974 and cannibalized for spare parts

General characteristics
- Class & type: Allen M. Sumner class destroyer
- Displacement: 2,200 tons
- Length: 376 ft 6 in (114.8 m)
- Beam: 40 ft (12.2 m)
- Draft: 15 ft 8 in (4.8 m)
- Propulsion: 60,000 shp (45 MW); 2 propellers
- Speed: 34 knots (63 km/h)
- Range: 6500 nmi. (12,000 km) @ 15 kt
- Complement: 336
- Armament: 6 × 5 in (130 mm)/38 guns; 12 × 40 mm AA guns, 11 × 20 mm AA guns, 10 × 21 inch (533 mm) torpedo tubes, 6 × depth charge projectors, 2 × depth charge tracks

USS Mansfield (DD-728), was an Allen M. Sumner-class destroyer of the United States Navy

== Namesake ==
Duncan Mansfield was born in February 1778 at Albany, New York. He enlisted in the United States Marine Corps at Philadelphia, Pennsylvania on 11 August 1798 and served until 1805. While serving on the schooner USS Enterprise during the First Barbary War, Sergeant Mansfield volunteered for the cutting‑out expedition led by Lt. Stephen Decatur, Jr., 16 February 1804. Lieutenant Decatur and his 84‑man crew sailed ketch USS Intrepid, disguised as an Arab ship, into Tripoli Harbor to destroy the recently captured U.S. frigate USS Philadelphia and prevent her use against the United States.

The name Mansfield was canceled for DD-594 and reassigned to DD-728 on 26 July 1943. DD-594 was renamed Hart on 21 March 1944 before launching.

== Initial operations ==
Mansfield was laid down 28 August 1943 by the Bath Iron Works Corp., Bath, Maine; launched 29 January 1944; sponsored by Mrs. Edmond F. Jewell; and commissioned 14 April 1944.

After shakedown off Bermuda and further training at Norfolk and Casco Bay, Maine, Mansfield steamed via the Panama Canal for the West Coast, arriving San Diego 10 September 1944. A week later, in company with DesDiv 122, she headed for Pearl Harbor, conducting training exercises en route. After antiaircraft and shore bombardment exercises at Pearl Harbor, Mansfield and four other destroyers escorted a convoy to Ulithi.

== World War II ==
There Mansfield joined TG 38.1 to screen and serve as picket during carrier strikes against central Luzon, including the Manila area. On 10 December 1944, Mansfield, with DesRon 61 in TG 38.2, again screened raids on Luzon. After several successful strikes, a sudden typhoon canceled further strikes and capsized destroyers Hull, Spence, and Monaghan. Mansfield's task group picked up survivors and returned to Ulithi.

On 30 December, Mansfield joined TG 30.1 for airstrikes against Formosa and central Luzon. Afterwards, Admiral William Halsey took the 3rd Fleet, with TG 30.1, through the Bashi Strait into the South China Sea. However, no Japanese units challenged Halsey's fleet during its 3,800 mile foray along the China coast from Hong Kong to Saigon. From 10 to 20 January 1945, 3rd Fleet aircraft battered enemy facilities and merchant ships and destroyed 112 Japanese planes.

In early February 1945, Mansfield screened in TG 58.1 as carriers flew strikes against targets in the Tokyo industrial area. On 15 February Mansfield helped Bush splash an enemy fighter closing the formation. From 17 to 23 February, TG 58.1 lent fighter support for the Iwo Jima assault, then steamed at full speed back to the Tokyo area for bombing runs on Nagoya and Kobe. As heavy weather set in, the task group retired southward, pounding enemy shore installations on Okinawa while en route to Ulithi for replenishment.

From 14 March to 27 April 1945, Mansfield screened carriers during strikes against southern Kyushu, followed by sweeps against Okinawa Gunto. On 9 May 1945, her flattops again pounded Kyushu, Okinawa, and the island groups between. From 28 May, when the 5th Fleet again became the 3rd Fleet and TG 58.1 became TG 38.1, to the Japanese surrender 15 August, the destroyer operated off the Japanese homeland. Three weeks before VJ Day, Mansfield, with eight destroyers of DesRon 61, conducted a daring high‑speed torpedo run into Nojima Saki, sinking or damaging four enemy ships.

After witnessing the formal Japanese surrender ceremony (alongside the USS Missouri) in September in Tokyo Bay, Mansfield returned to the West Coast. During the postwar years, the combat veterans trained reservists from the West Coast and made annual cruises to WestPac as part of the Destroyer Force, Pacific Fleet.

== Korean War ==
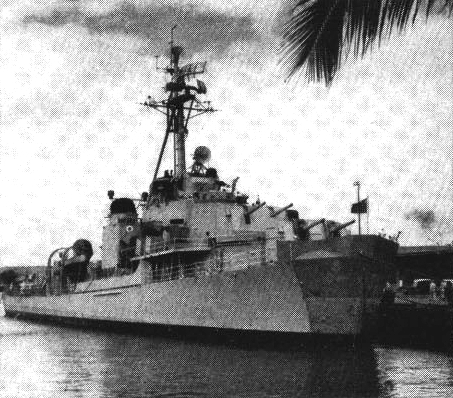
Mansfield with a temporary bow after being mined in 1950.

On 27 June 1950, two days after the North Korean invasion of South Korea, Mansfield steamed from Sasebo, Japan, to South Korea to provide gunfire support and escort services. Three months later, as flagship for DesDiv 91, she led the division into Inchon Channel, openly inviting shore batteries to unmask themselves. After the shore opened up upon her, Mansfield smothered them with a 5‑inch bombardment; she suffered no damage or casualties in the action.

Two weeks after Inchon, Mansfield, while searching for a downed Air Force B‑26, struck a mine which severed the bow below the main deck and seriously injured 27 crewmembers. Receiving a stub bow at Subic Bay, she steamed to Naval Shipyard, Bremerton, Washington for repairs; rejoining the U.N. Fleet off South Korea late in 1951 for gunfire support, escort, and shore bombardment duty.

After Korea, Mansfield alternated between duty in WestPac and training West Coast reservists. Overhauled in the fall of 1955 at the Naval Shipyard, Long Beach, California, she returned there in 1960 for FRAM. The Mark II overhaul and conversion replaced her 3-inch 50 cal. battery with Mark 25 and Mark 32 antisubmarine torpedo batteries, and configured the aft superstructure for DASH. From October 1960 to October 1961, the "new" destroyer conducted training exercises with the 1st Fleet off the West Coast. For the following 3 years, home ported at Yokosuka, she provided escort service for the 7th Fleet's Fast Carrier Attack Force.

== Vietnam ==
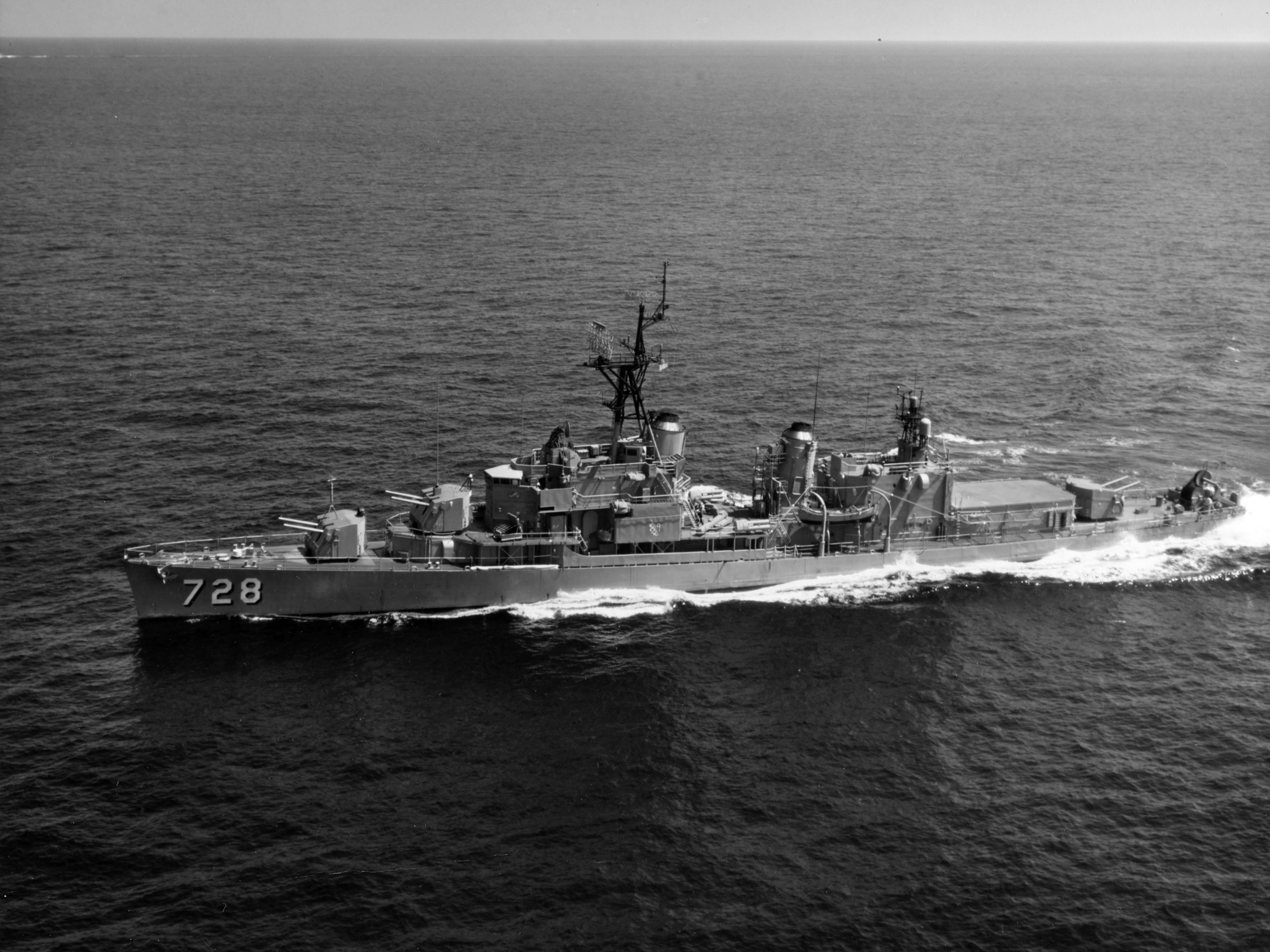
Mansfield underway after her FRAM II-modernization.

To be home ported at Long Beach, the destroyer returned to the United States in June 1964. On 20 August 1965 Mansfield again sailed westward for duty with the 7th Fleet. For the next 6 months she carried out screening and plane guard duties with fast carriers, and provided gunfire support for South Vietnamese, Australian, and American forces fighting in South Vietnam.

In June 1966, Mansfield was once again assigned Yokosuka Naval Base as her homeport, after which her deployment schedule repeatedly took her back to the South China Sea for operations off the coast of Vietnam. Excluding 2 weeks in September with TF 130 as an alternate recovery ship for Gemini XI and 2 weeks in late November as station ship at Hong Kong, she spent the remainder of 1966 off the Vietnamese coast in roles which ranged from blockade patrol in the I Corps area and the interdiction of junk and sampan traffic from the north into South Vietnam, to gunfire support south of Saigon. Adding air‑sea rescue to her services in 1967, she continued to carry out similar missions in support of Allied operations in Vietnam from 1967 into 1970. On 25 September 1967, 0930, the Mansfield was hit by North Vietnam shore battery off Tiger Island, north of the DMZ. MM2 Richard Archer was KIA and 19 were wounded.

== End of career ==
The Mansfield was decommissioned 4 February 1971. On 1 February 1974, she was officially stricken from the Navy Vessel Register. Along with USS Collett, she was sold to Argentina, 4 June 1974, and cannibalized for spare parts.

Mansfield received five battle stars for World War II service, three for Korean service, and at least three for Vietnam service.

== See also ==
- USS Hart (DD-594), intended name Mansfield
