= USS Compton =

Allen M. Sumner-class destroyer

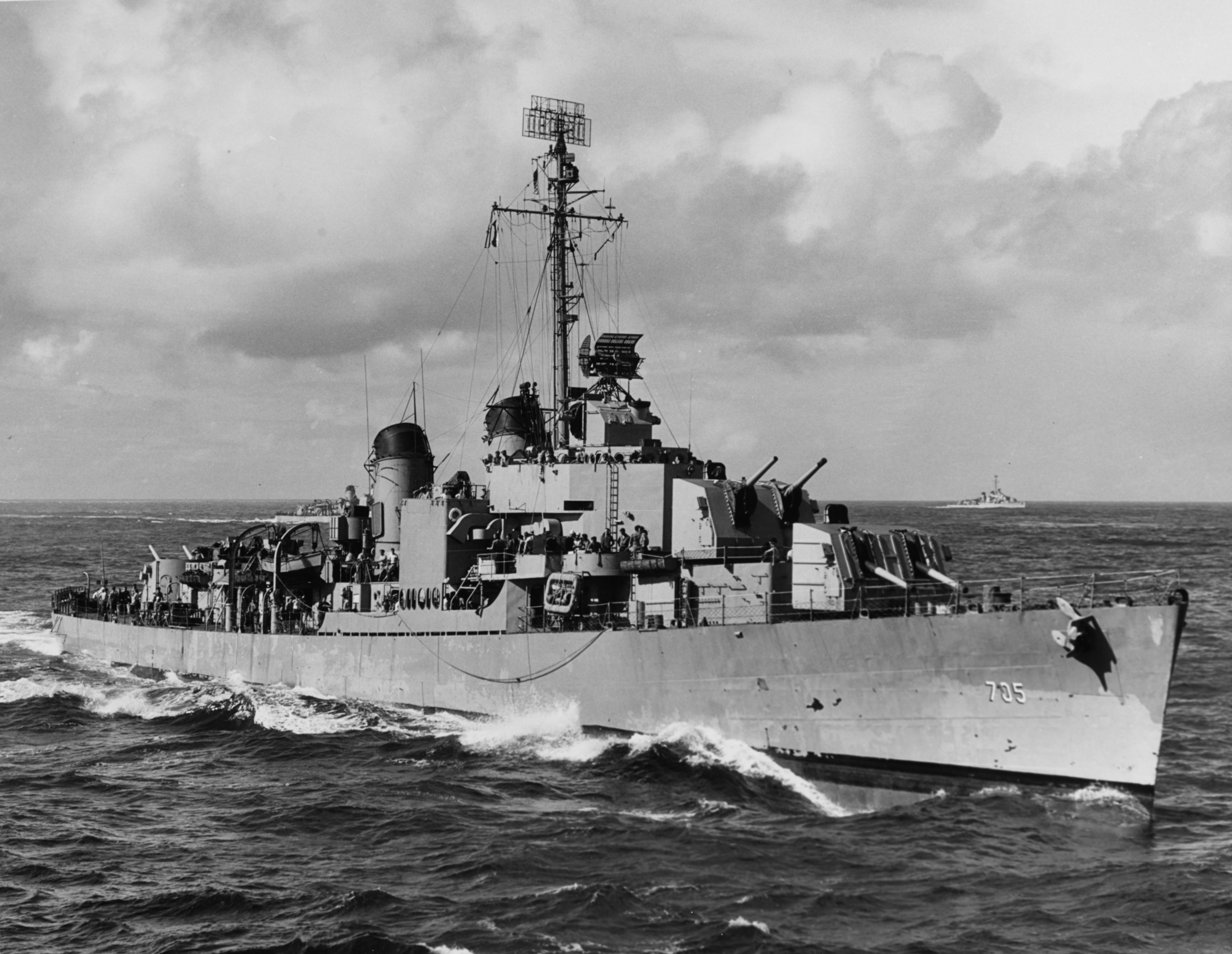
- USS Compton

History

United States
- Name: Compton
- Namesake: Lewis Compton
- Builder: Federal Shipbuilding and Drydock Company
- Laid down: 28 March 1944
- Launched: 17 September 1944
- Commissioned: 4 November 1944
- Decommissioned: 17 September 1972
- Stricken: 17 September 1972
- Fate: To Brazil 27 September 1972

Brazil
- Name: Mato Grosso
- Namesake: Mato Grosso
- Acquired: 27 September 1972
- Stricken: Stricken July 1990
- Fate: Stricken July 1990 and broken up for scrap.

General characteristics
- Class & type: Allen M. Sumner-class destroyer
- Displacement: 2,200 tons
- Length: 376 ft 6 in (114.76 m)
- Beam: 40 ft (12 m)
- Draft: 15 ft 8 in (4.78 m)
- Propulsion: 60,000 shp (45,000 kW); 2 propellers
- Speed: 34 kn (63 km/h; 39 mph)
- Range: 6,500 nmi (12,000 km; 7,500 mi) at 15 kn (28 km/h; 17 mph)
- Complement: 336
- Armament: 6 × 5 in (130 mm)/38 caliber guns, 12 × 40 mm AA guns, 11 × 20 mm AA guns, 10 × 21 inch (533 mm) torpedo tubes, 6 × depth charge projectors, 2 × depth charge tracks

USS Compton (DD-705), an Allen M. Sumner-class destroyer, was named for Lewis Compton, who served on active duty in the Navy during World War I and Assistant Secretary of the Navy from 9 February 1940 to 13 February 1941.

Compton was launched on 17 September 1944 by Federal Shipbuilding and Drydock Co., Kearny, New Jersey; sponsored by Mrs. L. Compton; and commissioned on 4 November 1944.

== Service history ==
Compton cleared Norfolk 17 February 1945 for training at Pearl Harbor between 16 March and 5 April, when she sailed to escort ships to Kwajalein and Eniwetok. Sailing on to Ulithi, she cleared for Okinawa on 20 April. As the operations there continued, Compton offered gunfire support to forces ashore and served in the antisubmarine and antiaircraft screens protecting shipping off the island. On 12 May she covered the occupation of nearby Tori Shima, and while returning to her station off Okinawa was attacked by a lone Japanese plane which she splashed.

After repairs at Leyte from 17 May to 16 June 1945, Compton returned to Okinawa for continued operations until 4 July, when she sailed to escort a convoy to Guam, returning to Leyte Gulf on 10 July. For the remainder of the month, she screened ships training in the Gulf, then returned to Okinawa, where she lay at anchor in Buckner Bay until 25 August.

=== 1945-1968 ===
Sent then to carry mail to the 3rd Fleet at sea, Compton entered Sagami Wan on 28 August 1945.

On 25 August 1945 Compton got underway to deliver operational orders and intelligence material to ships of the 3rd Fleet operating off the entrance to Tokyo Bay. Two days later while passing mail to the battleship Idaho, she collided with the starboard side of Idaho, damaging several of her frames and plates and suffering small punctures to her side. She entered Sagami Wan to await the destroyer tender Piedmont. The tender arrived but before repairs could be begin both ships were ordered into Tokyo Bay. On 29 August 1945 Compton entered Tokyo Bay and became the only fifth fleet ship to enter Tokyo Bay prior to the formal surrender.

For the next six months, she served on patrol in the western Pacific, and acted as planeguard while air organizations were redistributed throughout the Far East. She cleared Yokosuka on 21 February 1946 for San Pedro, California, arriving on 15 March. Two weeks later she sailed to join the Atlantic Fleet, raising Portland, Maine on 16 April. After overhaul, she operated along the northeast coast and in the Caribbean until 3 February 1947, when she sailed for her first tour of duty in the Mediterranean. Compton returned to her home port, Newport, Rhode Island on 14 August 1947.

Along with east coast operations, Compton cruised the Caribbean on intensive training and midshipmen cruises in the years that followed, as well as serving as schoolship and training members of the Navy Reserve. During her 1948-49 deployment to the Mediterranean, she had duty with the United Nations Palestine Patrol. She returned to the Mediterranean in 1951, and in the late summer of 1952 cruised in European waters in NATO "Operation Mainbrace." Assignment to duty with the 6th Fleet in the Mediterranean came once more in 1953 and 1955, and in the spring of 1956, Compton exercised off Bermuda with ships of the British Home Fleet in NATO operation "New Broom V."

During the summer of 1953, Compton was the flagship of Destroyer Squadron 8, and along with two cruisers, spent six weeks touring the Caribbean on a midshipman cruise carrying contract (reserve) midshipmen from universities around the country. The fleet of ten ships sailed from Norfolk and called at Coca Sola, Panama, Port of Spain, Trinidad, and Guantanamo Bay, Cuba and back to Norfolk.

Compton was serving at Bahrain in the Persian Gulf in the fall of 1956 when the Suez Crisis erupted, and stood by to evacuate American civilians in the Persian Gulf and Red Sea areas should that become necessary. With the Suez Canal closed, Compton made her homeward passage by way of Mombasa, Durban, the Cape of Good Hope, Simonstown, Recife, and Trinidad, returning to Newport on 8 January 1957. That fall, she again cruised off the British Isles in a series of NATO operations. From November 1957 to April 1958, she again served in the Mediterranean, the Persian Gulf and the Red Sea, and that summer cruised to Rotterdam and Bergen with midshipmen on board for training. From that time into 1960, her operations were coastwise and in the Caribbean, as she aided research and development projects, including major meteorological research and gave service to the Fleet Sonar School at Key West. In August 1960 Compton again sailed to the Mediterranean for duty in the 6th Fleet.

[1960-1968]

== 1968-1972 ==
During 1968–9, Compton served in the 1st Naval District (headquartered at Boston, Massachusetts) as a Naval Reserve training ship. She provided Naval Reserve enlistees in their first year of service at the ranks of seaman, seaman apprentice, and seaman recruit with a two-week training cruise. The reserve cruises supplemented the "boot camp" training which was conducted at Great Lakes, Great Lakes, Illinois. The ship's routine for the cruises was to leave Boston, rendezvous with another destroyer and a submarine off the New England coast, perform anti-submarine warfare exercises, and proceed to Halifax, Nova Scotia, Canada, for a brief "liberty", where the Canadian Navy would host sailors from Compton in its enlisted club. During these cruises, enlistees were given the opportunity to experience shipboard life, including firing the weapon systems such as Hedgehog, depth charges, and 5-inch (127 mm) guns.

[1969-1972]

== Decommissioning ==
Compton was decommissioned on 17 September 1972. She was stricken from the Navy List on 27 September 1972.

== Brazilian Navy service ==
Compton was transferred to Brazil on 27 September 1972. She served in the Brazilian Navy under the name Mato Grosso.

Mato Grosso was stricken in July 1990 and scrapped.

== Honors and awards ==
Compton received one battle star for World War II service.
