= USS Collett =

Allen M. Sumner-class destroyer

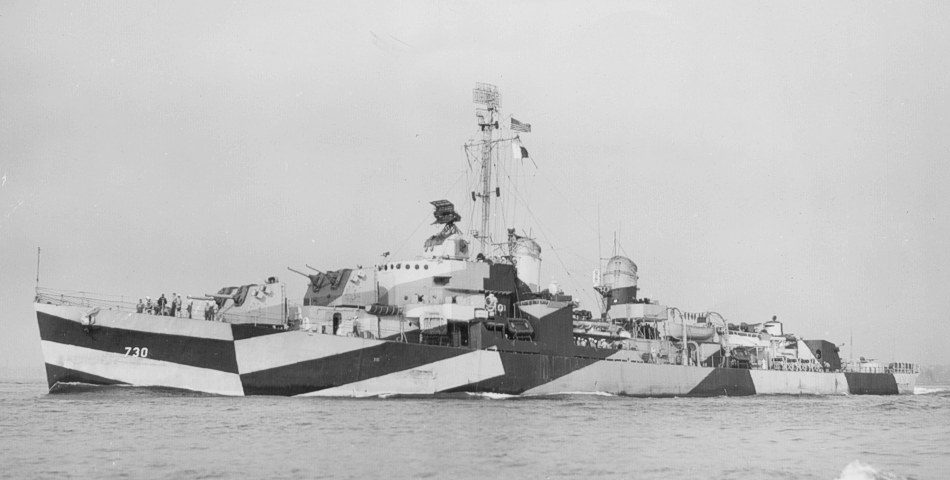
- USS Collett (DD-730), off Boston, Massachusetts, 31 May 1944

History

United States
- Name: Collett
- Namesake: John A. Collett
- Builder: Bath Iron Works
- Laid down: 11 October 1943
- Launched: 5 March 1944
- Commissioned: 16 May 1944
- Decommissioned: 18 December 1970
- Stricken: 1 February 1974
- Identification: DD-730
- Motto: Virtus Velox ("Swift Courage")
- Fate: To Argentina 4 June 1974

Argentina
- Name: ARA Piedrabuena
- Acquired: 4 June 1974
- Commissioned: 17 May 1977
- Decommissioned: 18 February 1985
- Stricken: 18 February 1985
- Identification: D-29
- Fate: Sunk by missile in naval exercise, 1988

General characteristics
- Class & type: Allen M. Sumner-class destroyer
- Displacement: 2,200 tons
- Length: 376 ft 6 in (114.76 m)
- Beam: 40 ft (12 m)
- Draft: 15 ft 8 in (4.78 m)
- Propulsion: 60,000 shp (45,000 kW); 2 propellers
- Speed: 34 knots (63 km/h; 39 mph)
- Range: 6,500 nmi (12,000 km; 7,500 mi) at 15 kn (28 km/h; 17 mph)
- Complement: 336
- Armament: 6 × 5 in (127 mm)/38 cal. guns, 12 × 40 mm AA guns, 11 × 20 mm AA guns, 10 × 21 inch (533 mm) torpedo tubes, 6 × depth charge projectors, 2 × depth charge tracks

USS Collett (DD-730) was a World War II-era Allen M. Sumner-class destroyer in the service of the United States Navy.

== Namesake ==
John Austin Collett was born on 31 March 1908 in Omaha, Nebraska. He graduated from the United States Naval Academy in 1929. He was killed in action during the Battle of the Santa Cruz Islands on 26 October 1942, while commanding Torpedo Squadron 10 on the USS Enterprise.

== Construction and commissioning ==
Collett was launched 5 March 1944 by Bath Iron Works Corp., Bath, Maine; sponsored by Mrs. C. C. Baughman as proxy for Mrs. J. D. Collett; and commissioned at the Boston Navy Yard on 16 May 1944, with Commander James D. Collett, the brother of LCdr Collett, in command.

== U.S. service history ==
=== World War II ===
Assigned to the Pacific Fleet, Collett reached Pearl Harbor 16 October 1944 and Ulithi 3 November. From this base, she screened the Fast Carrier Task Force (variously designated TF 38 and TF 58) for the remainder of the war. She first saw action in the air raids on Luzon and Formosa, which accompanied the advance of ground forces on Leyte, and prepared for the invasion at Lingayen from November 1944 into January 1945.

On 14 November 1944, while acting as a picket for TF 38, she was attacked by four Mitsubishi G4M "Betty" bombers. The ship is credited with shooting down two Betty bombers and dodging two torpedoes on this day.

In January the carriers she screened continued to launch air attacks on Taiwan, the China coast, and the Nansei Shoto, and on 16 and 17 February sailed daringly close to the Japanese coast to strike targets on Honshū before giving air cover to the invasion of Iwo Jima from 20 to 22 February.

Collett returned to Empire waters with the carrier task force to screen during air raids on Honshū 25 February 1945, joined in the bombardment of Okino Daito Shima 2 March, and returned to screening during the air strikes on Kyūshū and southern Honshū of 18 to 20 March. From 23 March to 24 April, the force concentrated its strikes on Okinawa, invaded on 1 April. On 18 April Collett joined with four other destroyers and carrier aircraft to sink Japanese submarine I-56 at 26°42′N 130°38′E.

After replenishing at Ulithi, Collett rejoined TF 58 11 May 1945 for its final month of air strikes supporting the Okinawa operation, and from 10 July to 15 August sailed with the carriers as they flew their final series of heavy air attacks on the Japanese home islands. With her squadron, she swept through the Sagami Nada on 22 and 23 July, aiding in the sinking of several Japanese merchantmen. After patrol duty off Japan, and guarding the carriers as they flew air cover for the landing of occupation troops, Collett entered Tokyo Bay 14 September 1945, and 4 days later sailed for a west coast overhaul.

=== Korean War ===
Remaining on active duty with the Pacific Fleet from World War II into 1960, Collett alternated local operations and cruises along the west coast with tours of duty in the Far East, the first of which came in 1946–1947. She was in the Far East upon the outbreak of the Korean War in June 1950, and after patrolling off Pusan from her base at Sasebo, and escorting cargo ships laden with military supplies to Korea, she sailed up the difficult channel to Inchon on 13 September to begin the preinvasion bombardment. She carried out her mission, although hit four times by counterfire which wounded five of her men, and on the 15th, returned with the invasion force, to whom she provided gunfire support once the landings had been made, as well as protective cover at sea. Her outstanding accomplishment in the invasion of Inchon was recognized with the awarding of the Navy Unit Commendation. After taking part in the Wonsan landings on 26 October, she returned to San Diego, California 18 November 1950.

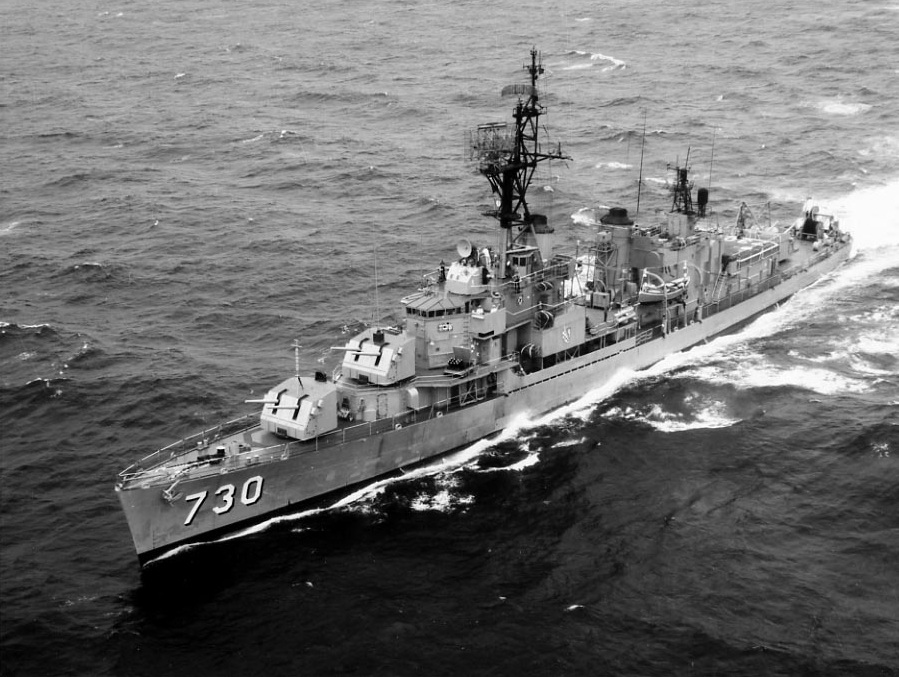
Collett in July 1966.

Her second tour of duty in the Korean war, from 18 June 1951 to 17 February 1952, found her screening TF 77 as it conducted air strikes on the Korean east coast, training with an antisubmarine group off Okinawa, patrolling in the Taiwan Straits, and conducting shore bombardments along the coast of Korea. Similar duty, aside from bombardment, was her assignment during her third tour, from 29 August 1952 to 9 April 1953.

From the close of the Korean war, Collett served in the Far East in between 1953 and 1959. Early in 1960 she began an extensive modernization, which continued until July 1960. On 19 July 1960, Collett collided with the destroyer USS Ammen off Newport Beach, California, killing 11 and injuring 20, all members of Ammen's crew. USCGC Heather rendered assistance after the collision. Despite a badly smashed bow, Collett made port under her own power, entering the Long Beach Naval Shipyard for extensive repairs. Her bow was removed and replaced with that of Seaman, an incomplete destroyer in the Reserve Fleet. On 5 November 1960, Collett departed Long Beach for coastal operations, which continued intermittently for the remainder of the year.

=== Vietnam War ===
Following repairs in 1961, Collett was home ported in Yokosuka, Japan, 1962-1964 for Seventh Fleet assignments that included participating in fleet exercises, patrolling the Taiwan Straits and the Gulf of Tonkin.

In the autumn of 1964, a Variable Depth Sonar (VDS) was installed at the Yokosuka Naval Shipyard. Collett returned to Long Beach via Australia but returned to the Seventh Fleet in 1965 for duty from May to August. Because Collett provided naval gunfire support while in the Mekong River on 19 August 1965, personnel on board that day may be eligible for VA benefits related to Agent Orange exposure according to the website benefits.va.gov.

According to the Command History USS Collett, DD 730 Westpac deployment 1966-1968 document, the weapons delivery systems of the Collett during this time were three 5 inch/38 twin mounts, two fixed and trainable torpedo tubes, two hedgehog mounts, and DASH (Drone Anti-Submarine Helicopter). The ship was again home-ported in Yokosuka, Japan, 1966–1968, and performed a variety of combat missions in the Gulf of Tonkin. Her assignments included Search and Rescue (SAR), Naval Gunfire Support (NGFS), Operation Sea Dragon, and plane guarding for carriers. During her deployment, Collett was taken under fire by North Vietnamese shore batteries on five occasions. The ship was one of the few American vessels to serve with both HMAS Perth (D 38) and HMAS Hobart (D 39) of the Royal Australian Navy.

Per the Cruise Summary for 1969-1970, in September 1969, Collett left for a six-month deployment with the Seventh Fleet and served at Yankee Station on 27 October to 14 November. A second tour at Yankee Station from 21 December 1969 to 20 January 1970 was followed by a third tour in February when Collett's motor whaleboat was used to rescue 7 survivors of a Navy helicopter. Later in February, Collett provided 4 days of shore bombardment in support of Operation Dung Son 3/70. On 27 February 1970, Collett arrived in Subic Bay for the journey home.

According to the website www.history.navy.mil, awards and citations presented to various personnel aboard the Collett from 1958 to 1970 include: Armed Forces Expeditionary Medal; CINCPACFLT Letter of commendation; Combat Action; Naval Unit Commendation; Navy and Marine Corps Medal; Navy Achievement Medal with Combat "V"; Navy Commendation Medal; Republic of Vietnam Meritorious Citation – Gallantry; Seventh Fleet Letter of Commendation; and the Vietnam Service Medal.

== Argentine service ==
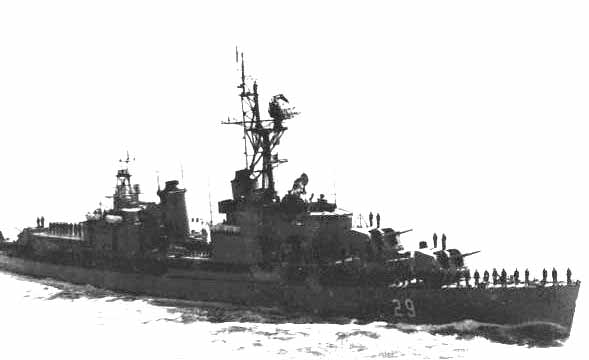
ARA Piedrabuena

In 1974, Collett and Mansfield were purchased by Argentina as a supply of spare parts for other ships, and towed from San Diego to Puerto Belgrano. However, Collett was found to be in good enough condition to be worth rehabilitating.

On 17 May 1977, she was commissioned in the Argentine Navy as ARA Piedrabuena (D-29), the fourth ship in Argentine service with that name.

=== Falklands War ===
During the Falklands War, on 2 May 1982, Piedrabuena was steaming in company with the cruiser ARA General Belgrano when the cruiser was sunk by the British attack submarine HMS Conqueror. In author Michael Rossiters' 'Sink the Belgrano', (Random House, London, 2009), it says Belgrano was unable to send any Mayday signal because of electrical failure; this and poor visibility meant the two escorting destroyers, the other being ARA Bouchard, (both also ex-United States Navy vessels), were unaware of the sinking until some hours later. A total of 323 men were killed.

=== Decommissioning and fate ===
On 18 February 1985, Piedrabuena was decommissioned from and stricken from the ships' register. In November 1988, ex-Piedrabuena was sunk in a naval missile exercise, by an MM38 missile fired by the newly commissioned corvette ARA Espora.

== Awards ==
Collett received six battle stars for World War II service, and in addition to the Navy Unit Commendation, six battle stars for the Korean War and two battle stars for the Vietnam War.
