= Fleet Rehabilitation and Modernization =

US Navy life-extension program for World War II-era ships

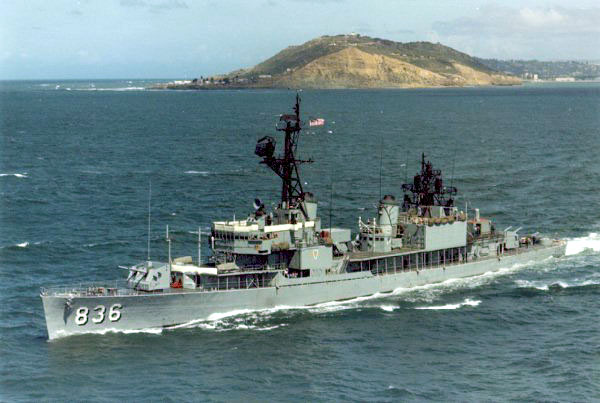
USS George K. MacKenzie, after her FRAM I conversion.

The Fleet Rehabilitation and Modernization (FRAM) program of the United States Navy extended the lives of World War II-era destroyers by shifting their mission from a surface attack role to that of a submarine hunter. The FRAM program also covered cruisers, aircraft carriers, submarines, amphibious ships, and auxiliaries. The United States Coast Guard also used this term in the 1980s for the modernization of its Hamilton-class cutters.

== Background ==
The program was started by Admiral Arleigh Burke as a response to estimates that the Soviet Navy would have a force of about 300 modern fast-attack submarines by 1957. The U.S. Navy was unable to produce quickly enough the destroyer escorts (redesignated as frigates after 1975) and other antisubmarine warfare ships to counter this threat, given its other priorities in new antiaircraft warfare frigates (redesignated as cruisers after 1975) and aircraft carriers, so Admiral Burke instead looked for ways to modify the existing World War II destroyers, which were rapidly becoming outdated anyway.

Burke oversaw preparation of a report to the House and Senate Appropriations Committees entitled "The Aging Fleet." The idea that became FRAM was only one of six recommendations of a special committee to address the poor material conditions of ships built during World War II. Those recommendations were, in order of preference:

1. Build new ships,
2. Give more time to maintenance,
3. Accomplish more extensive overhauls,
4. Provide more money for maintenance,
5. Institute better training for maintenance personnel, or
6. Create a large-scale modernization and rehabilitation program to fill the gap until new ships can be built.

United States Secretary of the Navy Thomas S. Gates embraced the last recommendation in a meeting with United States Secretary of Defense Neil Hosler McElroy on 11 November 1958.

A comparable program for the Royal Navy had provided modifications to 33 British War Emergency Programme destroyers, which were converted during 1949–1956 into 23 Type 15 first-rate antisubmarine warfare frigates and 10 Type 16 limited conversions, pending the construction of new Type 12 and Type 14 frigates.

== FRAM destroyers ==
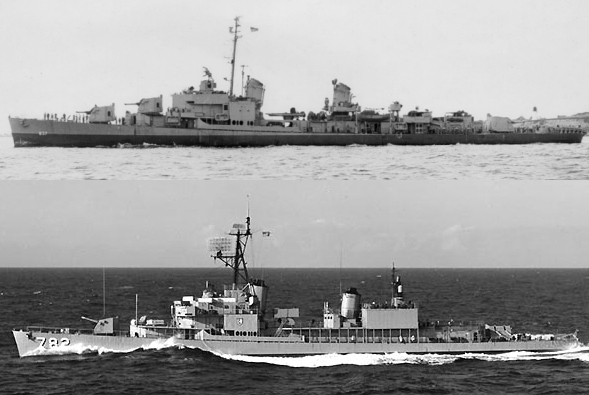
Sarsfield (top) as delivered and Rowan (bottom) after FRAM I.

Among the destroyers, conversion of the Gearing and Allen M. Sumner classes took precedence over the Fletcher and Benson classes. Destroyer conversions relied on experience with Fletcher-class destroyers modernized for transfer to Spain and Germany in 1957. The first two destroyers began FRAM in Boston, Massachusetts and Long Beach, California shipyards in March 1959.

In Navy slang, the modified destroyers were called "FRAM cans", "can" being a contraction of "tin can", the slang term for a destroyer or smaller destroyer escort.

In order to provide the ships with a credible antisubmarine weapon, the FRAM I upgrade for the Gearing class centered on the addition of AN/SQS-23 sonar and two new weapon systems, the ASROC rocket-assisted torpedo launcher with a range of one to five miles (not in FRAM II upgrades), and the DASH antisubmarine helicopter with a range of up to 22 miles (35 km). Both were armed with the new Mark 44 torpedo, which was also carried in the torpedo tubes of the warships. The ASROC could also launch a nuclear depth charge.

There were three different sets of FRAM upgrades. During refitting in the early 1950s, FRAM I Fletcher-class destroyers gave up the No. 2, 3 and 4 5-inch/38 caliber gun mounts, leaving only the two mounts on the main deck. A trainable Mark 15 Hedgehog mount took the place of the No. 2 gun mount, connected to a new, enlarged sonar suite. All topside 21-inch (533 mm) torpedo tubes were removed and replaced with two tubes mounted in the after deckhouse. One twin 3-inch/50 caliber gun mount was placed aft, atop the after deckhouse. There were variations such as Boyd, which had the 5-inch/38 mount 3 removed in exchange for two twin 3-inch/50 caliber gun mounts above the after deckhouse connected to a computer controlled aft director. FRAM II changes saw the replacement of the Hedgehog mount with a Mark 108 Weapon Alpha ASW rocket launcher, the addition of two new triple Mark 32 torpedo tubes for the 12.75-inch (324 mm) Mk.44 torpedo and the removal of the 3 in guns for the DASH hangar and flight deck. The only Fletcher-class destroyers to receive the FRAM II upgrade were Radford, Jenkins and Nicholas.

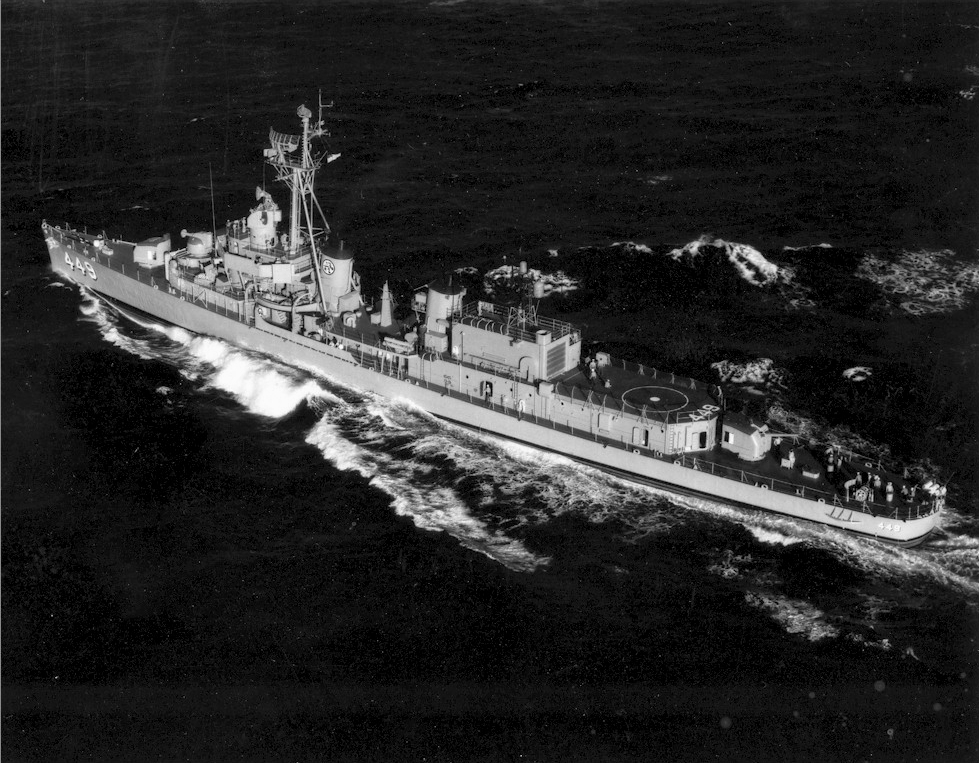
Nicholas, a Fletcher-class destroyer, after her FRAM II upgrade.

Ships from the Gearing class were completely torn down and rebuilt from the hull up, including new engines, a much larger combat information center, and new sonar and radar systems. The 21-inch torpedo tubes between the funnels were removed, and the 8-round ASROC launcher (FRAM I only) placed there instead. All 3-inch/50 cal gun mounts were removed, and the after superstructure was used for the DASH's hangar and flight deck, with two new triple Mark 32 torpedo tubes for the 12.75-inch Mk.44 torpedo placed just behind the rear funnel. This modernization was designed to extend the life of the destroyer by at least eight years. Eventually, all but three Gearings received FRAM I or FRAM II conversions.

== FRAM II ==
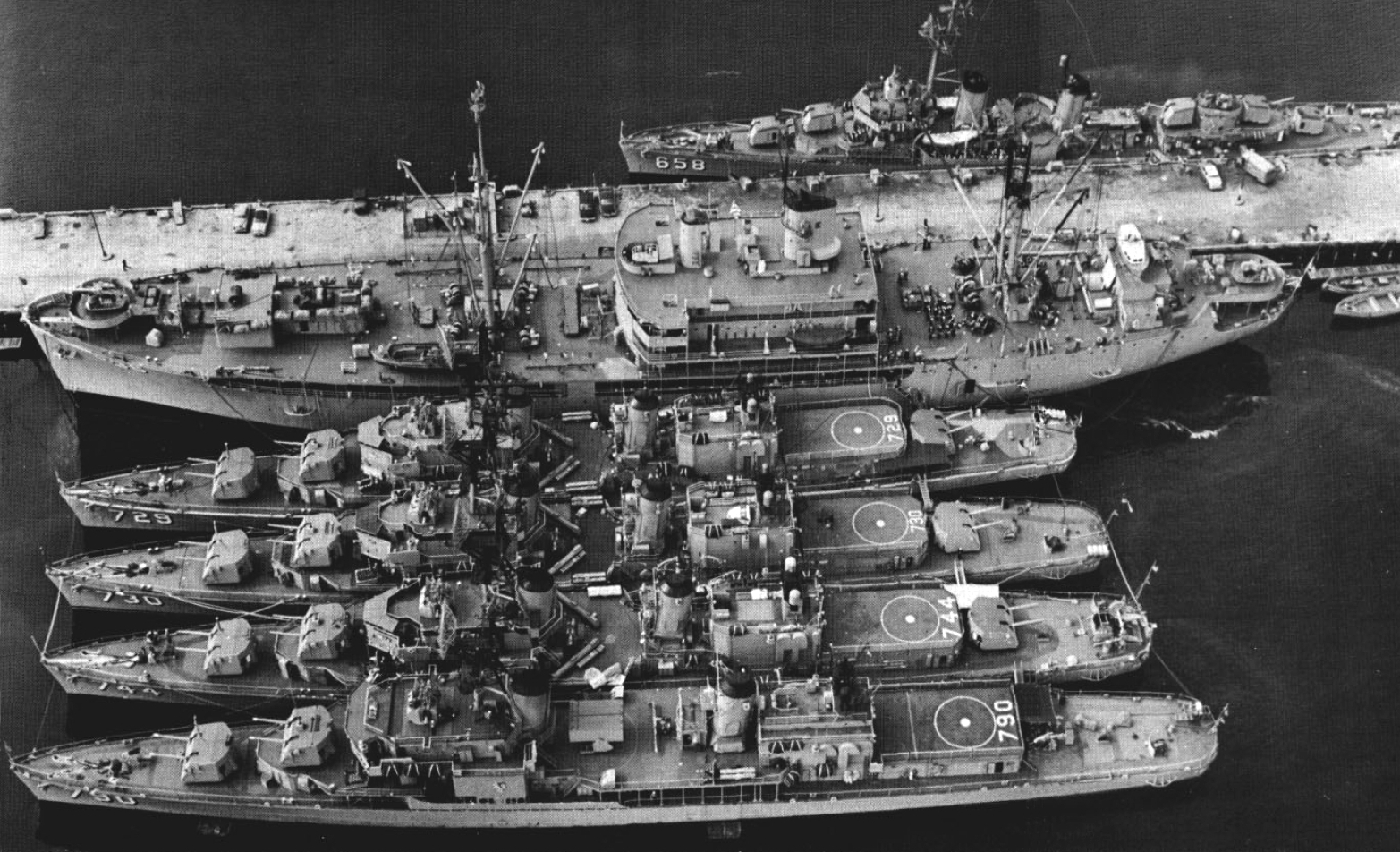
Bryce Canyon with FRAM II-modernised Lyman K. Swenson, Collett and Blue. Shelton, closest to camera, received FRAM I (note the ASROC launcher on the mid-deck).

Ships in the Allen M. Sumner class received only armament modifications under FRAM II, and not all ships of the class received the FRAM upgrades. Although the rear deck was also converted as a flight deck for the DASH, the new 12.75-inch triple torpedo tubes were placed where the older 21-inch ones had been, and ASROC was not installed. Typically, all three 5-inch/38 twin mounts were retained. Additionally, two new 21-inch torpedo tubes for the Mark 37 ASW homing torpedo and variable depth sonar (VDS) were added. The converted Allen M. Sumners were designed for another five years of service.

Sixteen Gearings were also converted under FRAM II. These included six radar picket destroyers (DDRs) and six escort destroyers (DDEs) that retained their specialized equipment (radar or trainable Hedgehog), as well as four former DDRs that were converted to near-twins of the Allen M. Sumner-class FRAM II destroyers. No Gearing FRAM IIs received ASROC. The retained DDRs kept all six 5-inch guns, and photographs show their DASH hangar was smaller than on other ships, plus the landing pad had no markings, so they may not have received the DASH.

All classes came in for FRAM II refits starting about 1959, being rotated out of service in order to keep as many ships at sea as possible. The upgrades were complete by 1965, and most of the ships involved continued to serve actively until the late 1960s.

== FRAM destroyer summary ==
A total of 95 Gearings and 33 Allen M. Sumners received FRAM modifications 1960–1965. Many of the ships provided significant gunfire support in the Vietnam War. DASH was withdrawn from ASW service beginning in 1969 due to poor reliability. Lacking ASROC, the Allen M. Sumners were left without a standoff ASW capability, and were decommissioned 1970–1973, with most being transferred to foreign navies. The Gearings lasted somewhat longer in US service, with most decommissioned and transferred to foreign navies 1973–1980. The FRAM destroyers were replaced as ASW ships by the Knox-class frigates (destroyer escorts prior to 1975), which were commissioned 1969–1974, and the Spruance-class destroyers, which were commissioned 1975–1983. Both of the replacement classes had the same ASW armament as a Gearing FRAM I destroyer, with the addition of more and faster ASROC reloads, improved sonar, and a piloted helicopter, typically the Kaman SH-2 Seasprite.

Some ships of the Allen M. Sumner (from 1965) and Gearing classes (from 1973) served in the Naval Reserve Force (NRF), remaining in commission with a partial active crew to provide training for Naval reservists. The last FRAM destroyer in US naval service was William C. Lawe, a Gearing FRAM I, decommissioned and stricken 1 October 1983 and expended as a target 14 July 1999.

== FRAM II Carriers ==
The Essex-class aircraft carriers modified for ASW service received the SCB 144 upgrade in 1960–1964 as part of the FRAM II program. They received a bow-mounted AN/SQS-23 sonar, as well as improved displays in the Combat Information Center.

== Bibliography ==
- Faltum, Andrew (1996). The Essex Aircraft Carriers. Annapolis, Maryland: Nautical & Aviation Publishing. ISBN 1-877853-26-7.
