= USS Sarsfield =

Gearing-class destroyer

Coordinates: 22°59′18.7980″N 120°09′22.8168″E

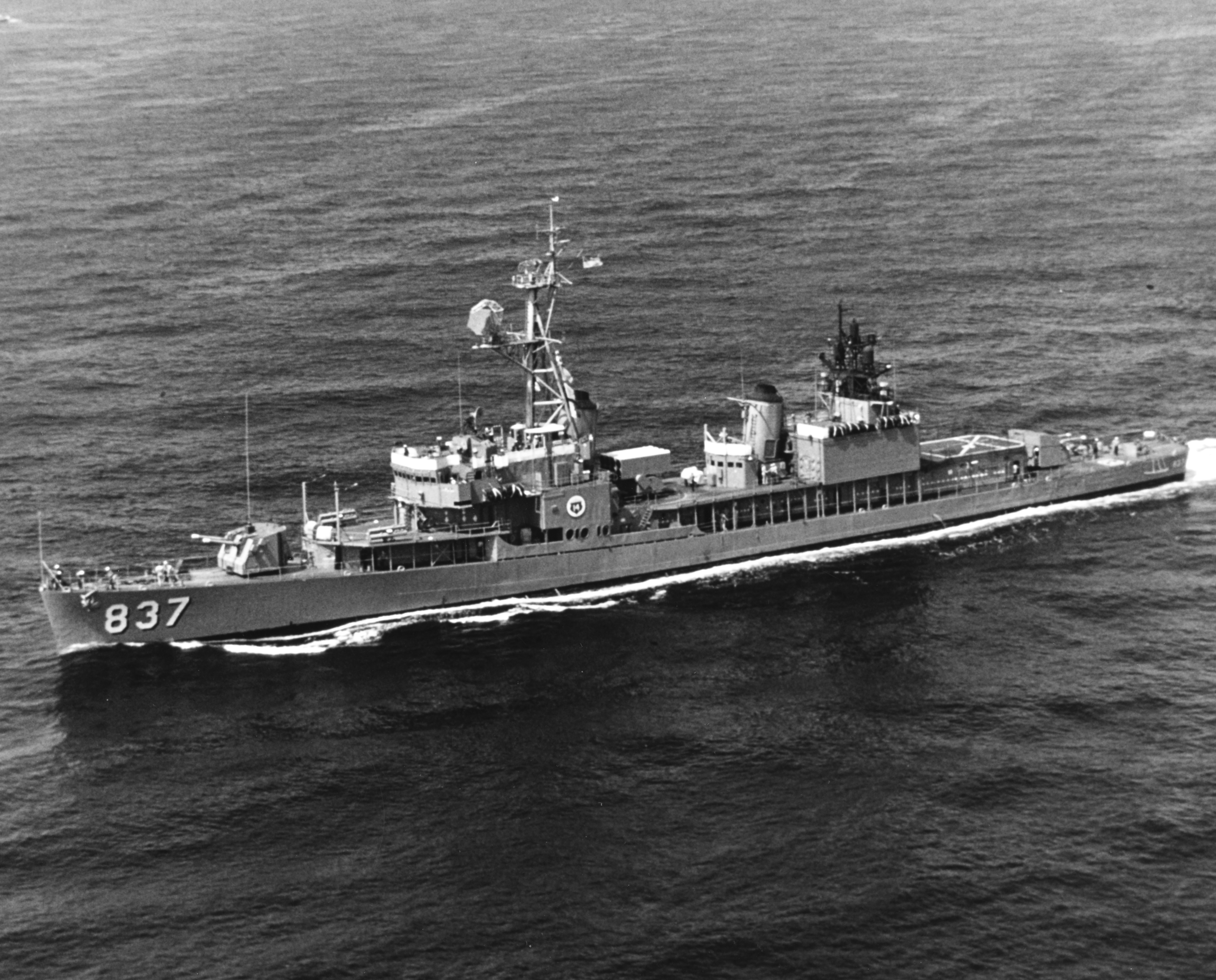
- USS Sarsfield underway on 23 July 1973

History

United States
- Name: Sarsfield
- Namesake: Eugene S. Sarsfield
- Builder: Bath Iron Works
- Laid down: 15 January 1945
- Launched: 27 May 1945
- Sponsored by: Mrs. Eugene S. Sarsfield
- Commissioned: 31 July 1945
- Decommissioned: 1 October 1977
- Stricken: 1 October 1977
- Identification: Callsign: NBBK; Hull number: DD-837
- Motto: Volens et Valens; (Willing and Capable)
- Honors and awards: See Awards
- Fate: Transferred to Taiwan, 1 October 1977
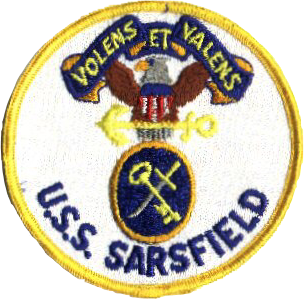
- Badge

Taiwan
- Name: Te Yang; (德陽)
- Namesake: Te Yang
- Acquired: 1 October 1977
- Commissioned: January 1978
- Identification: Hull number: DD-925
- Reclassified: DDG-925, December 1989
- Decommissioned: 1 April 2005
- Status: Museum ship at Anping Port since 22 January 2009

General characteristics
- Class & type: Gearing-class destroyer
- Displacement: 3,460 long tons (3,516 t) full
- Length: 390 ft 6 in (119.02 m)
- Beam: 40 ft 10 in (12.45 m)
- Draft: 14 ft 4 in (4.37 m)
- Propulsion: 2 General Electric geared turbines, 2 shafts, 60,000 shp (45 MW)
- Speed: 36.8 knots (68.2 km/h; 42.3 mph)
- Range: 4,500 nmi (8,300 km) at 20 kn (37 km/h; 23 mph)
- Complement: 367
- Armament: 6 × 5"/38 caliber guns; 12 × 40 mm AA guns; 11 × 20 mm AA guns; 10 × 21 inch (533 mm) torpedo tubes; 6 × depth charge projectors; 2 × depth charge tracks

USS Sarsfield (DD-837), was a Gearing-class destroyer of the United States Navy. She then served in Taiwan's navy as ROCS Te Yang (DD-925) for 27 years, and now is a ship museum.

== Namesake ==
Eugene S. Sarsfield was born on 19 April 1902 in Brooklyn, New York. He entered the United States Naval Academy in 1922. Upon his graduation on 3 June 1926, he was commissioned ensign and served on the USS Nevada, USS New York, and USS Hannibal, before receiving submarine instruction in 1929 and torpedo training in 1930. During the next four years, he served successively on USS Greer, USS Argonne, and USS Constitution. Following duty with the 3d Naval District, he joined USS Badger in July 1935, and returned to New York in September 1937. He instructed naval reservists in the 3d Naval District for two years before reporting to USS Kearny on 10 June 1940 to serve as executive officer and navigator. He was commended by the Secretary of the Navy, Frank Knox, for "Leadership, personal courage and ingenuity in solving the many problems arising under adverse conditions" when Kearny was torpedoed off Iceland on 17 October 1941.

Given command of USS McCormick on 8 December 1941, he was detached on 3 October 1942 to supervise the outfitting of the USS Maddox and he assumed command of that destroyer at its commissioning on 3 October 1942. He was awarded the Legion of Merit for exceptionally meritorious conduct as commanding officer of Maddox when she attacked and probably sank an enemy submarine on 6 May 1943. While acting as an escort for an Atlantic convoy, the destroyer made contact with the submerged enemy submarine and delivered two accurate depth charge attacks. The submarine was damaged by the first attack, and after the second attack, appeared briefly on the surface upside down.

On 10 July 1943 during the Allied invasion of Sicily, Maddox was steaming alone in support of the assault at Gela, and was attacked by a Luftwaffe Junkers Ju 88 bomber of KG 54. The ship was gravely damaged by one direct hit and two near misses. Lieutenant Commander Sarsfield remained on board supervising the abandonment of the rapidly sinking ship and helped greatly to save the lives of 9 officers and 65 men of the 284 on board. He was reported missing and officially presumed dead on the next day. He was posthumously awarded the Navy Cross.

== Construction and career ==
Sarsfield was laid down on 15 January 1945 by the Bath Iron Works Co., Bath, Maine, and launched on 27 May 1945, sponsored by Mrs. Eugene S. Sarsfield. The ship was commissioned at Boston Naval Shipyard on 31 July 1945.

=== Service in the United States Navy ===
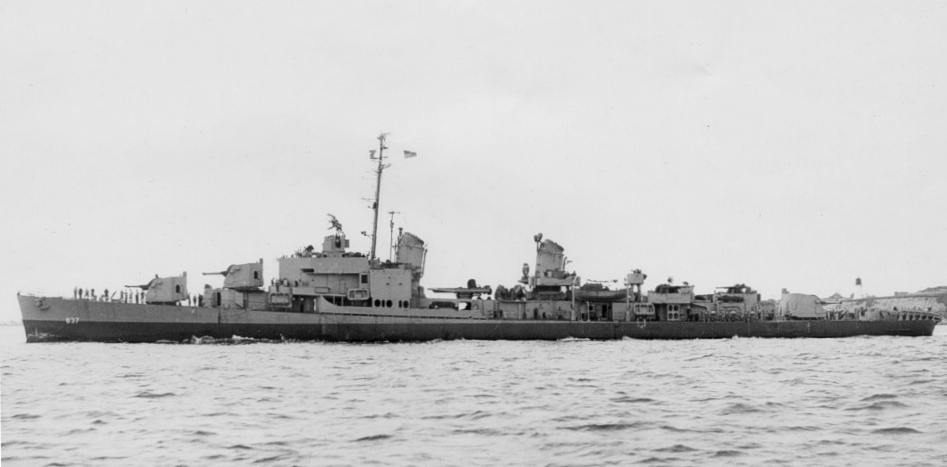
Sarsfield underway off Boston 1945.

After the ship's fitting-out was complete, she sailed on 24 August, for Guantanamo Bay, Cuba, and shakedown training. She returned to Boston on 30 September and, after post-shakedown alterations, got underway, on 25 October, for New York City and the Navy Day celebration. Following her stay at New York, she participated in training exercises in the Chesapeake Bay-Virginia Capes area until 13 December, when she entered the Brooklyn Navy Yard for installation of some experimental equipment.

On 1 February 1946, Sarsfield sailed from New York bound for Key West, Florida. She arrived in Key West on 4 February to begin two decades with the Operational Development Force located there. Attached to the Surface Antisubmarine Development Detachment, Atlantic Fleet, she participated in the testing and evaluation of new weapons and equipment and made periodic training cruises in the Caribbean and in the Gulf of Mexico. In 1950, the ship helped the new Eastern Test Range out of Cape Canaveral test two U.S. Army Bumpers, which were German V-2 rockets modified to carry an upper stage. Sarsfield was stationed a mile or two from shore for the first, 48-mile Bumper launch, and tracked it with its Mk.25 fire director, which provided radar and optical tracking.

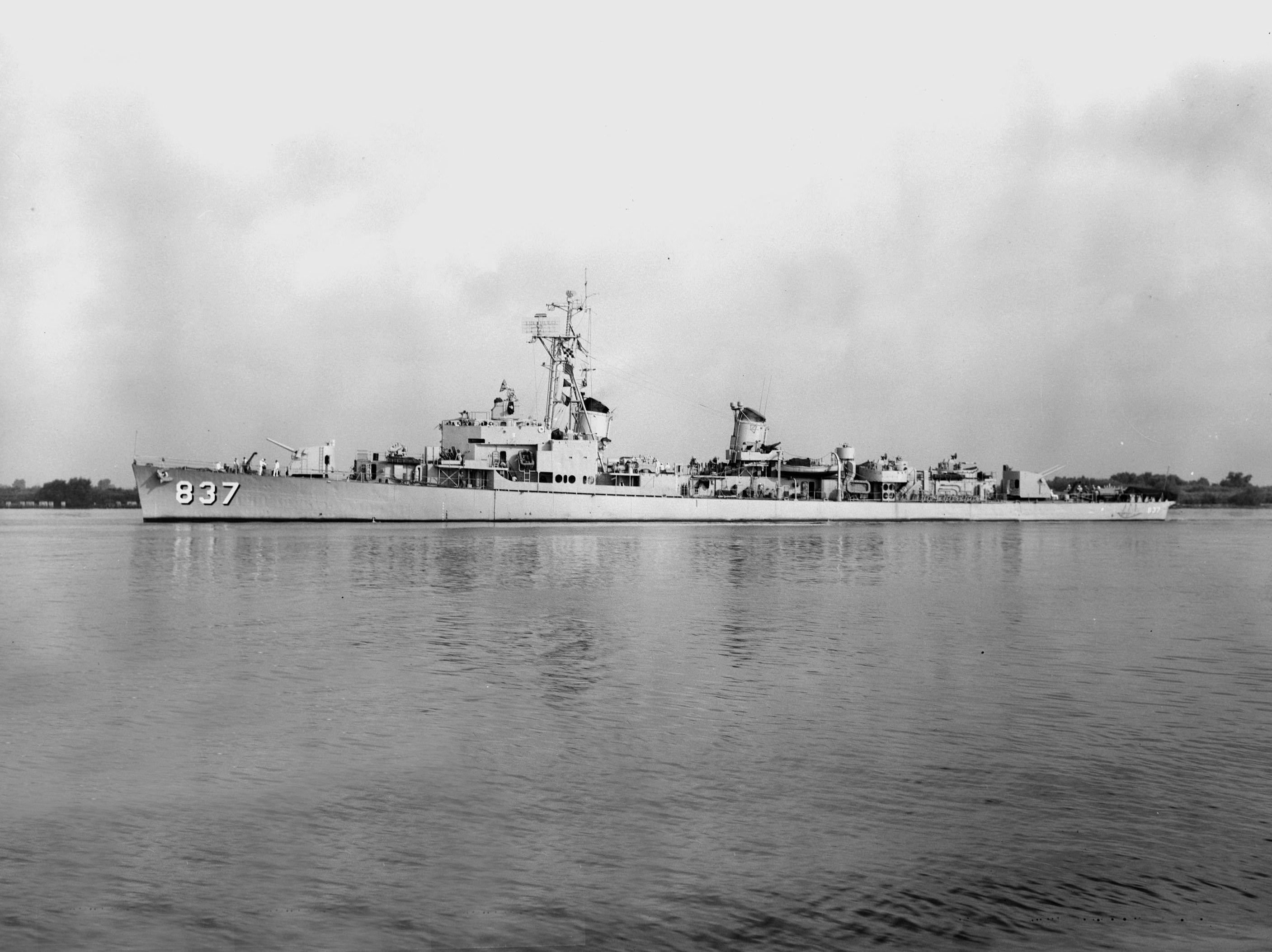
Sarsfield underway on 30 August 1952.

In addition to the work she did for the Operational Development Force, Sarsfield also served the Naval Mine Countermeasures Station at Panama City, Florida, from 9 to 14 February 1947; conducted operations for the Underwater Sound Laboratory at New London, Connecticut, from 3 September 1953 until 18 October 1954; and operated out of Newport, Rhode Island, between 8 July and 4 August 1955.

In 1956, she embarked VIPs for antisubmarine warfare demonstrations out of Key West, and in 1957, underwent overhaul at the Norfolk Navy Yard. On 6 February 1958, she joined units of Escort Squadron 14 at Charleston, South Carolina, for antisubmarine exercises. Following a cruise as plane guard to the aircraft carrier Leyte in early 1958, she returned to the Operational Development Force at Key West on 15 February. In the fall of 1958, Sarsfield entered Charleston Naval Shipyard for another overhaul. She departed Charleston on 5 January 1959 and conducted five weeks of refresher training out of Guantanamo Bay, Cuba, after which she returned to Key West and further experimental work.

==== Project Mercury ====
This employment, testing antisubmarine detection and destruction devices, continued until January 1961, when she was deployed, with shore bombardment responsibilities, to Guantanamo Bay, Cuba. Later that year, in June, Caribbean unrest again required the Navy to deploy ships. Sarsfield cruised off the coast of Hispaniola. In September 1961, Sarsfield took station in the Atlantic as a recovery ship for Project Mercury, the first human space flight program of the United States.

In January 1962, she again took station for Project Mercury, this time off the coast of Africa. In August, she entered Boston Naval Shipyard for almost a year of Fleet Rehabilitation and Modernization overhaul. Before leaving Boston, in June 1963, she received several new weapons systems, including ASROC, DASH, long-range, distant air search radar, and long-range sonar. From Boston, she sailed to Guantanamo Bay for refresher training, then, to Charleston for another six months of weapons and sonar modifications. At the completion of these latest alterations, she cruised the Caribbean and then returned to Key West and the Operational Test and Evaluation Detachment. This employment continued until 1966. On 15 July, she again commenced overhaul, including still more sonar and radar changes.

The overhaul was completed on 30 January 1967, and by 7 February, she was back in Key West. Sarsfield spent the remainder of the month engaged in refresher training out of Guantanamo Bay. In April, she joined the aircraft carrier Forrestal for antisubmarine warfare exercises, then returned to Key West on 1 May to operate with the Fleet Sonar School. June and July were occupied by fleet exercises and NATO exercise Lashout. On 21 September, Sarsfield departed Key West for the Mediterranean, and on 17 December, returned home.

In early 1968, she operated off the Virginia Capes and in the Caribbean. In July 1968, she deployed to the Middle East. She called at many exotic ports on her voyage along the coasts of Africa and the Indian Ocean littoral. While on this tour of duty, Sarsfield also had the unique opportunity to participate in a spontaneous exercise with units of the Imperial Ethiopian Navy and the French Air Force. By 30 December, she was underway for the Western Hemisphere, and on 10 January 1969, arrived in Mayport, Florida.

Sarsfield remained in the Western Hemisphere for all of 1969 and 1970. During the first seven months of 1969, she resumed Caribbean and Atlantic operations. On 28 July, she commenced UNITAS X, an exercise involving elements of the United States, Brazilian, Argentine, Colombian, Chilean, Ecuadorian, Peruvian, Venezuelan, and Uruguayan navies. In December, upon the completion of this exercise, during which she visited ports in all the countries named, Sarsfield returned to Mayport to prepare for overhaul.

From January to June 1970, she was at Charleston, South Carolina, undergoing overhaul. In June, she commenced eight weeks of refresher training out of Guantanamo Bay, and upon completing it, returned to local operations out of Mayport for the rest of the year.

In January 1971, Sarsfield again deployed to the Middle East, entering the Indian Ocean in February. Tensions were rising in the region; the Bangladesh Liberation War broke out in March and led to the war between India and Pakistan in December. By 29 June, she was back at Mayport and resumed normal operations for the rest of 1971 and for the first three months of 1972.

==== Vietnam War ====
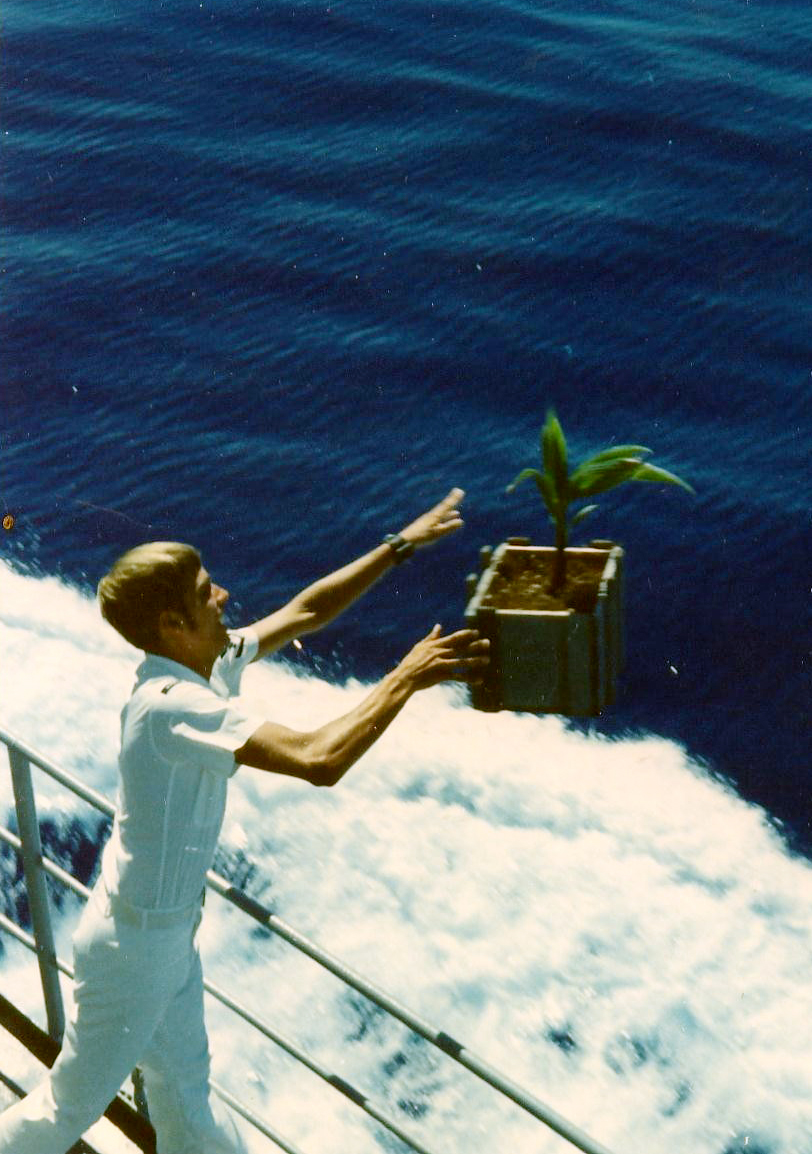
Rick Jorgensen disposing a palm tree he had grown in Guam, 1972.

On 13 April 1972, she got underway for an entirely different deployment. Proceeding via the Panama Canal, she arrived in Subic Bay, Philippines, on 11 May. Throughout the summer, Sarsfield plied the waters of the Gulf of Tonkin, first as plane guard for the carrier Saratoga, then, patrolling off Hainan Island. She also participated in shore bombardment missions. She departed the gunline on 12 September; stopped at Hong Kong for six days of liberty (15 to 21 September) and at Yokosuka, Japan, for four days (25 to 29 September); and then, got underway to return to the United States.

She entered San Diego on 13 October, transited the Panama Canal on 21 October, and reentered Mayport on 25 October. Upon her return, she resumed local operations out of Mayport. This employment continued until 29 May 1973, when she weighed anchor to join the 6th Fleet in the Mediterranean.

She sailed with the 6th Fleet until 22 September, when she passed through the Straits of Gibraltar to join NATO units in exercises in the Bay of Biscay and in the North Sea. On 10 October, she entered the Firth of Forth and, the next day, berthed at Edinburgh, Scotland. Two days later, at the outbreak of the Arab-Israeli War, she departed Scotland to reenter the Mediterranean with the carrier John F. Kennedy and sped to the eastern end of that sea. After more than a month of uncertainty, Sarsfield put into Athens, Greece, on 14 November for a five-day tender and leave period.

On 18 November, she was ordered to rejoin John F. Kennedy for the voyage back to the United States. She arrived at Mayport on 1 December and spent the rest of 1973 in a standdown and leave status. She remained in port at Mayport, Florida until May 1974 at which time she resumed Atlantic seaboard operations.

On 14 June 1974, in protest of perceived racism on the part of the command, nearly all of the ship's minority sailors occupied the fantail and refused orders to handle lines while Sarsfield was attempting a difficult mooring in an off-setting wind at the Charleston Naval Station. After being surrounded by the ship's Master-at-Arms force and being individually ordered by the Executive Officer, most of the demonstrating sailors returned to their quarters. Seven of them, however, refused to leave the quarterdeck despite direct orders to do so, and eventually left the ship without authority to do so. The seven sailors were eventually apprehended and originally charged with, among other things, mutiny. They were all eventually convicted of lesser charges in a joint General Courts Martial at NAS Jacksonville, Florida.

In the fall of 1974, Sarsfield departed Mayport, Florida to participate in Northern Merger with NATO units, and enjoyed port visits in Plymouth, England and Edinburgh, Scotland, as well as Lubeck, West Germany.

Sarsfield deployed on a Mediterranean cruise from 27 July 1975 to 27 January 1976, and enjoyed port visits in Gibraltar, BCC, Barcelona, Valencia, Rota and Algeciras, Spain, Siracusa and Taormina, Sicily, Naples, Italy, Palma, Mallorca, as well as Athens, and after transiting the Bosporus and Dardanelles, steamed in company with USS Belknap in the Black Sea.

The year 1976 saw gunnery practice in Chesapeake Bay, and a short shipyard period in Charleston, South Carolina. Winter of 1976-1977 was the ship's last deployment to the Mediterranean as part of the Franklin D. Roosevelt task force. Port visits included Rota, Spain; Naples, Italy; Trapani, Sicily (helping the city recover from a flood); Kalamata, Greece (American-style hamburger cookout at the local orphanage at Christmas); Sfax, Tunisia; Palma and Morocco. She anchored off the coast of Egypt with dozens of Russian ships and monitored Russian submarine operations; as well as extensive operations as part of Roosevelt's group. On return to the United States, many Taiwanese sailors joined the crew to learn ship operations before Sarsfield was struck from the Naval Vessel Register on 1 October 1977. On the same day she was transferred to the Republic of China (Taiwan).

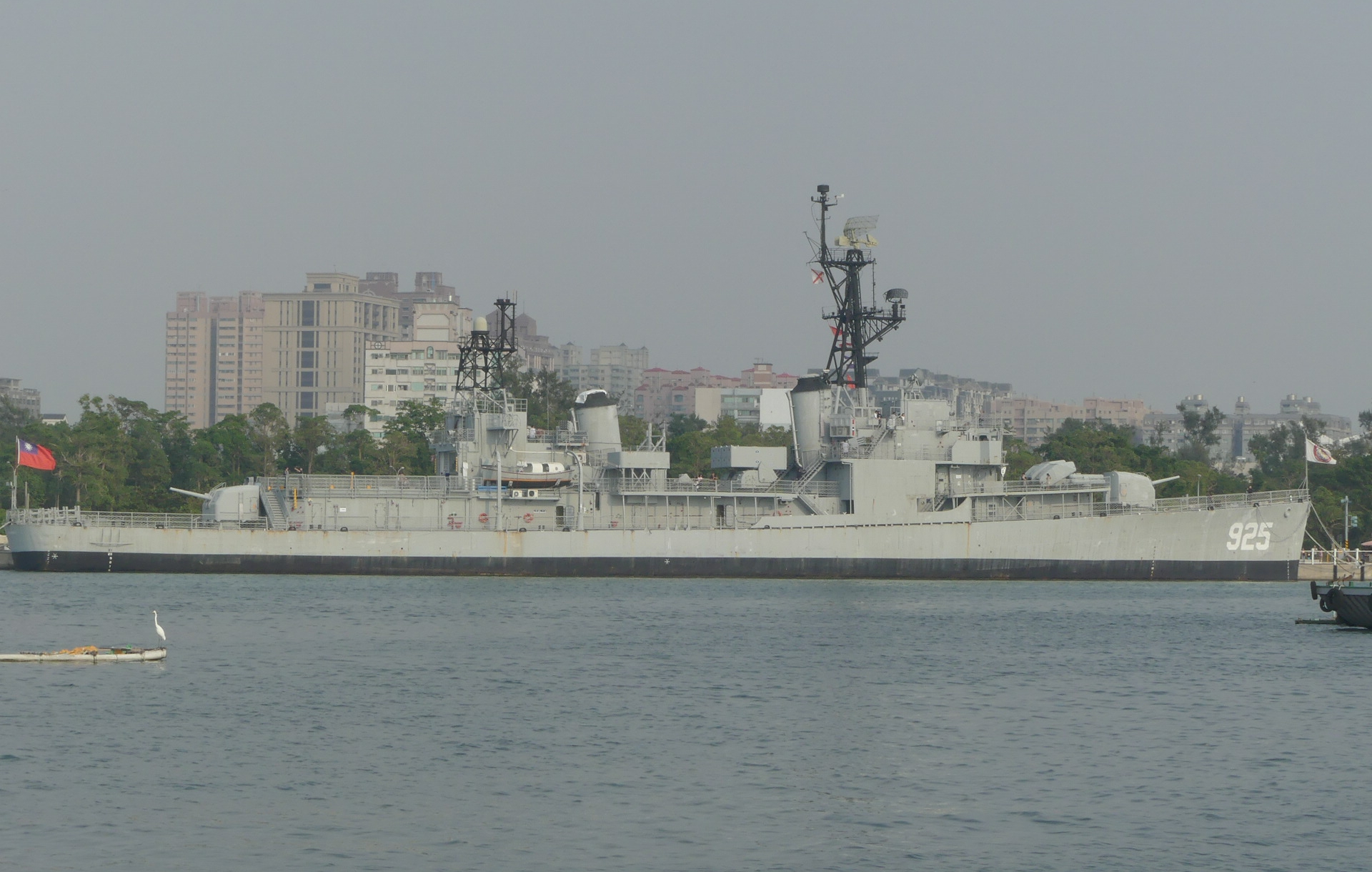
Te Yang as a museum ship in December 2016.

=== Service in the Republic of China Navy ===
The ship served in the Republic of China Navy as ROCS Te Yang (DD-925). Arrived in Taiwan in January 1978, via the Panama Canal, Long Causeway Port, Pearl Harbor, Midway Island, Guam, etc. about 13,000 nautical miles. In addition to serving as a Taiwan Strait escort and excellent performance in various exercises, she also participated in the Sino-US anti-submarine exercise and Dun Muyuan.

In December 1989, the Wu-Chin III modification project was carried out, which was later changed from DD-925 to DDG-925, which means missile destroyer. In December 1994, the Hsiung Feng II anti-ship missile was installed. In October 1997, she was incorporated into the 131 fleet. Te Yang was decommissioned on 1 April 2005 at Kaohsiung, Taiwan. On 22 January 2009, the ship was towed to the Anping Port in Tainan City to be preserved as a museum ship to this day.

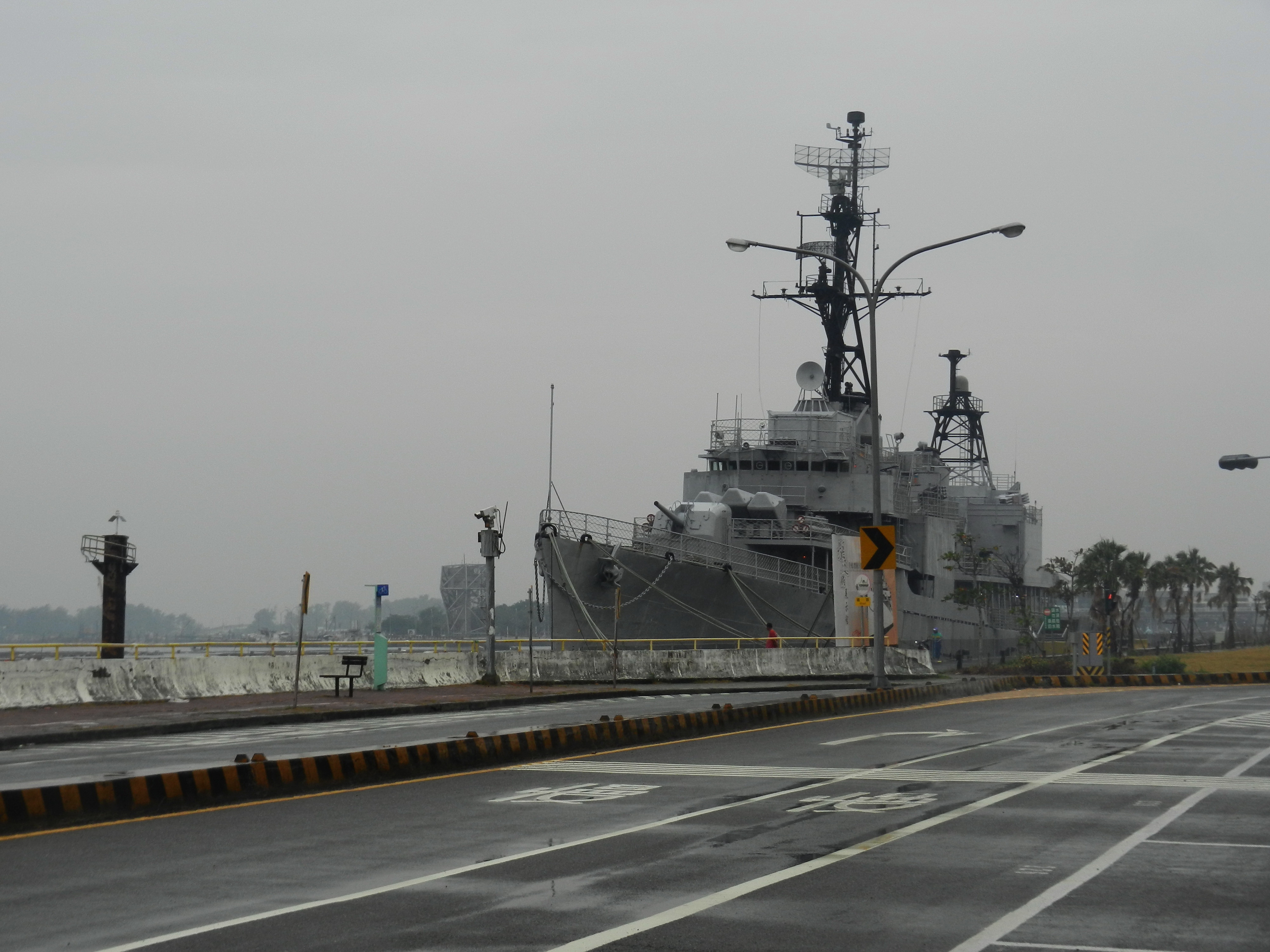
Te Yang on 12 November 2012

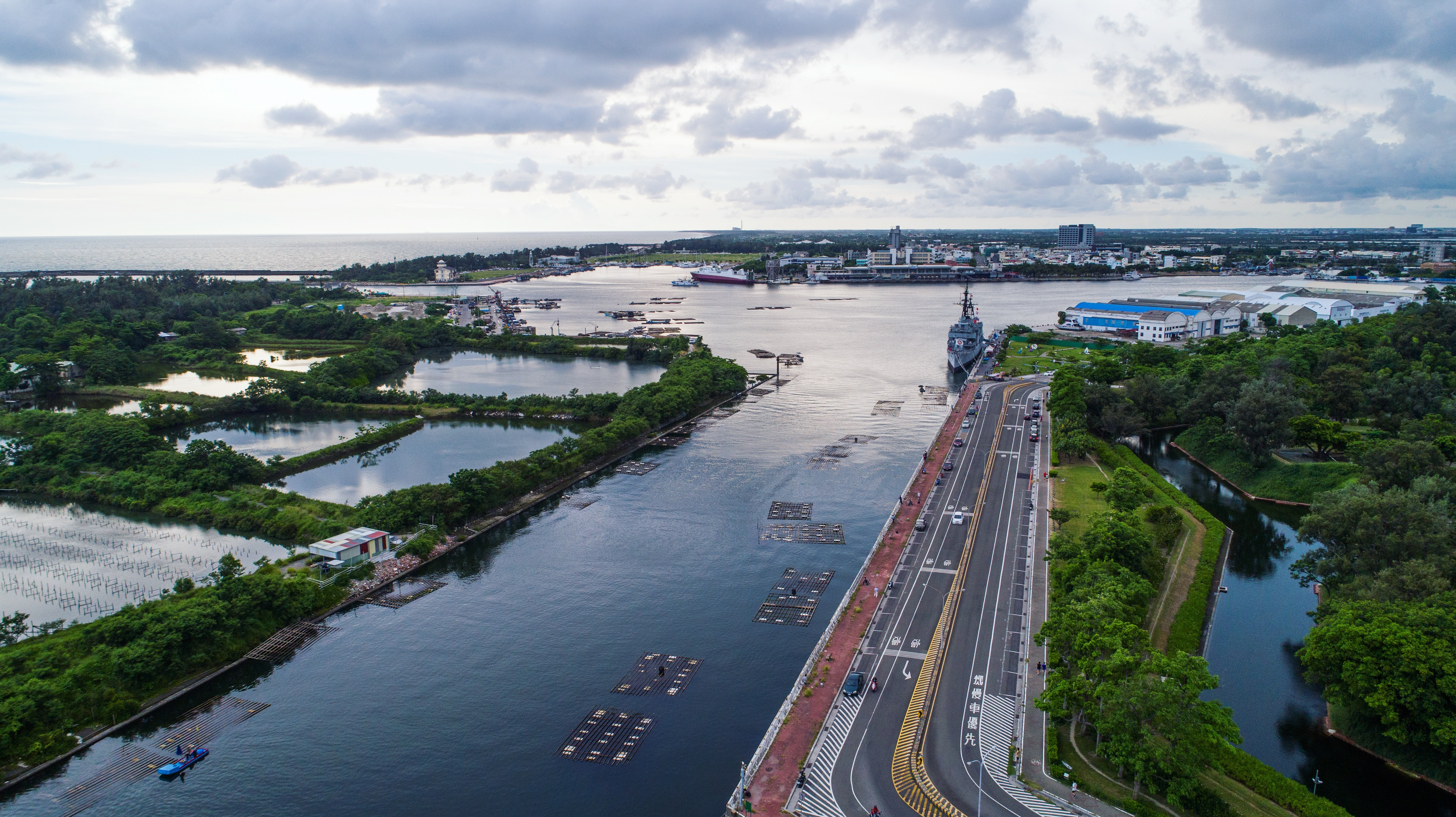
Aerial view of Te Yang on 2 July 2017

== Awards ==
Sarsfield earned one battle star for service in the Vietnam War.
