= USS Norris =

Gearing-class destroyer

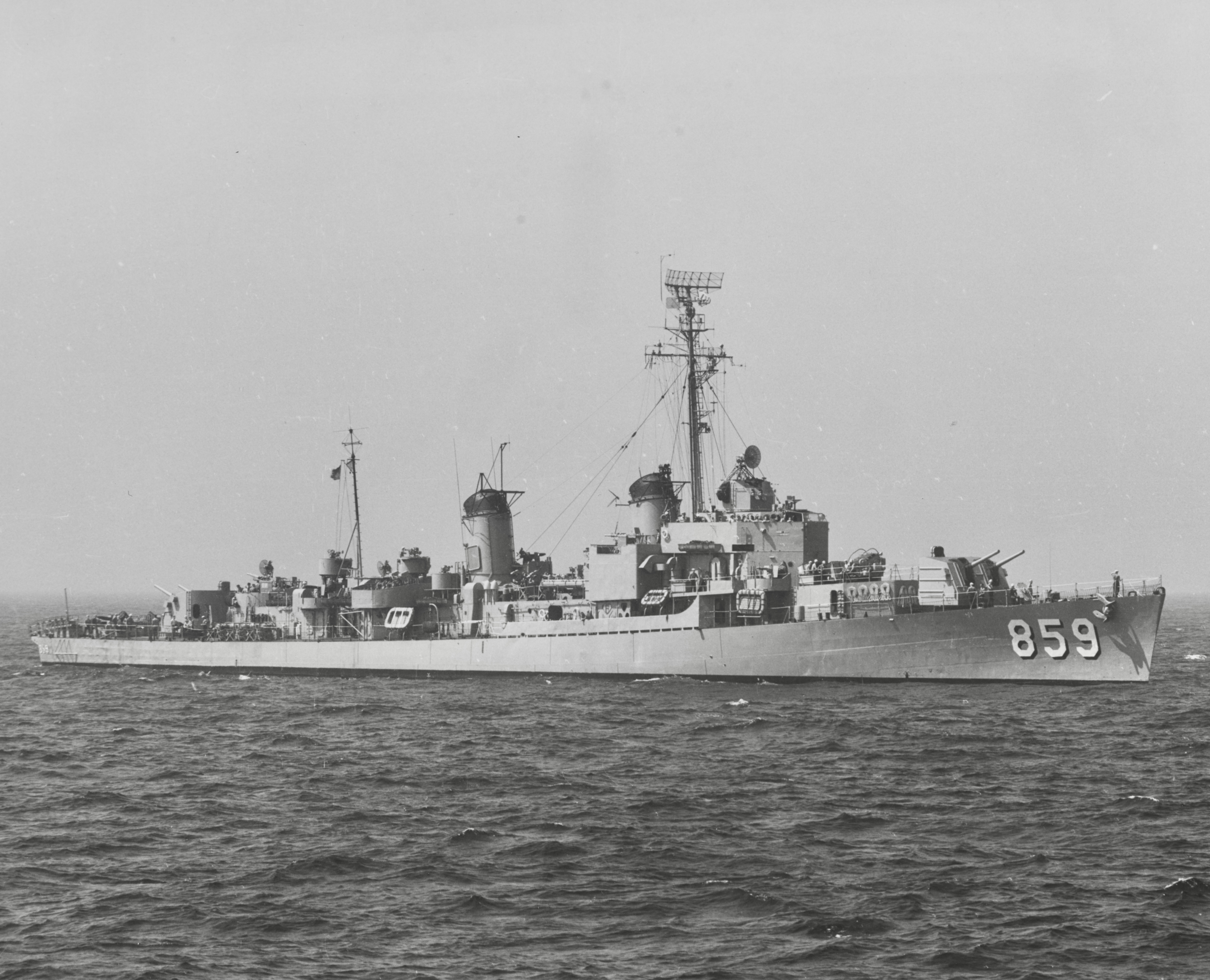
- USS Norris, 1952

History

United States
- Name: Norris
- Builder: Bethlehem Shipbuilding, San Pedro, California
- Laid down: 29 August 1944
- Launched: 25 February 1945
- Commissioned: 9 June 1945
- Decommissioned: 4 December 1970
- Reclassified: DDE-859, 4 March 1950; DD-859, 7 August 1962
- Stricken: 1 February 1974
- Identification: Callsign: NBFE; Hull number: DD-859
- Honors and awards: 2 battle stars (Korea)
- Fate: Transferred to Turkey 1 July 1974

Turkey
- Name: Kocatepe
- Acquired: 1 July 1974
- Fate: Sold for scrapping June 1994
- Notes: hull number D354

General characteristics
- Class & type: Gearing-class destroyer
- Displacement: 2,425 long tons (2,464 t)
- Length: 390 ft 6 in (119.02 m)
- Beam: 42 ft 6 in (12.95 m)
- Propulsion: 2 × DeLaval double turbines; 2 × 4-blade propellers
- Speed: 31.5 knots (58.3 km/h; 36.2 mph)
- Complement: 288
- Armament: 6 × 5"/38 caliber guns w/Mk.37 directors; 4 × 40 mm AA guns w/Mk.63 directors; 20 × 20 mm AA guns w/Mk.14 sight; 5 × 21 inch (533 mm) torpedo tubes; 6 × depth charge projectors (K-guns); 2 × depth charge tracks (8600 lb charges per track)

USS Norris (DD-859) was one of 98 Gearing-class destroyers in the United States Navy during the end of World War II. Norris was active from 9 June 1945 to 4 December 1970. Although built too late to see action during the war, the ship served in the Pacific, Atlantic, Asiatic, and Mediterranean areas.

== Namesake ==
Benjamin White Norris was born on 15 May 1907 at Callao, Peru. He was commissioned Second Lieutenant in the United States Marine Corps Reserves on 15 May 1919. He completed flight training on 6 May 1938 and was promoted to Major on 16 May 1942. He was killed in action 4 June 1942 while leading a search and attack mission during the Battle of Midway. He was posthumously awarded the Navy Cross.

== Construction and commissioning ==
Norris was laid down on 29 August 1944 by Bethlehem Steel Corp. in San Pedro, California. She was sponsored by the widow of Major Benjamin Norris, by proxy, Mrs. Charles Browning; and commissioned on 9 June 1945.

== 1945–1950: Training, patrol, overhaul, and Mediterranean deployment ==
After shakedown off California, Norris served three months with the Pre-Commissioning Training Center of Treasure Island, then sailed for duty off Hawaii. Her next assignment was Far Eastern patrol operations, for which she arrived at Hong Kong on 7 February 1946. Much of this deployment was spent preventing smuggling and privateering along the Chinese and Korean coasts. She returned to San Diego on 22 February 1947, and then returned again to the China coast where she remained from 8 January to 16 July 1948.

After an overhaul at Mare Island Naval Shipyard which included extensive alterations enhancing her anti-submarine capability, Norris joined the Atlantic Fleet at Newport, Rhode Island in October. Reclassified as escort destroyer DDE-859 on 4 March 1950, she trained for her first Mediterranean deployment, for which she sailed on 5 July, just after the outbreak of the Korean War. She was accordingly ordered on through the Suez Canal to join the United States Seventh Fleet in the combat area.

== Late 1950–mid 1952: Korean War service ==
Joining in blockade, patrol, fire support, and screening duties, Norris gave gunfire support during the Hŭngnam evacuation in early December 1950, and while on blockade rescued 21 South Koreans from a drifting junk off North Korea. Returning to Newport early in March 1951, Norris overhauled at Boston and trained in the North Atlantic and Caribbean until sailing on 19 April 1952 for her deferred first Mediterranean deployment.

== Mid 1952–1954: NATO exercise, Mediterranean cruises, collision ==
Peacekeeping duty with the United States Sixth Fleet continued until 27 June, when she returned to Newport to prepare for "Operation Main Brace", a major NATO exercise in the North Sea that took place from 26 August to 12 October. Mediterranean cruises from April 1952–February 1953 and January 1954–May 1954 followed, and from 28 June 1954 she operated primarily with the Hunter-Killer Force of the Atlantic Fleet for the next 15 months. During a fleet exercise on 31 October, she collided with USS Bergall (SS-320) when the submarine was attempting to fire torpedoes at the surface attack force.

== 1955–1957: Gibraltar, North Atlantic, and South America ==
From 2 May to 4 June 1955 she escorted replacements for the 6th Fleet to Gibraltar, then returned to anti-submarine evaluation and training in the western Atlantic and Caribbean, broken by a three-week patrol in the North Atlantic during the November 1956 Suez Crisis. With Destroyer Squadron 24 she made an extended training cruise to South America from early January to late March 1957, visiting ports in Brazil, Argentina, and Uruguay between antisubmarine exercises with various Latin American navies. She returned to the Mediterranean from August to December 1957, also serving in the Red Sea during this deployment.

== 1958–1966: Evaluation, training, Cuba, and the Mediterranean ==
Norris next served in Task Force Bravo, an experimental anti-submarine development group, until her next 6th Fleet duty from June–August 1960. After a FRAM II conversion at Philadelphia from March to December 1961, Norris had over a year of intensive Atlantic Fleet training operations, including a midshipman training cruise. She was reclassified a general purpose destroyer (DD-859) on 7 August 1962 and in October took station off Cuba during the quarantine provoked by the missile crisis. With the return of quiet, she was back in Newport in December to prepare for another Mediterranean deployment, which took place from 6 February–7 July 1963. In August, an experimental wire-guided torpedo system was installed by Boston Naval Shipyard, and Norris spent much of the next year testing and evaluating the new system.

== 1964–1966: Polaris and Gemini X ==
Deployed again to the Mediterranean from 1 October 1964 to 18 January 1965 and 19 August–7 December 1965, Norris served in Polaris support operations as a missile tracking ship from 1 to 15 April 1966, and in the primary recovery force for Gemini X from 12 to 23 July.

== Vietnam War service ==
Intensified operations in Vietnam called her with other ships of Destroyer Squadron 20 and they left Newport on 4 October for Panama and Yokosuka, arriving on 10 November. As they had in Korea, her guns supported troops ashore, first driving back Viet Cong attempting to overrun Vũng Tàu on 21 November. After four months on the gunline giving major service in the struggle to keep South Vietnam free, Norris completed a circumnavigation by returning via Suez to Newport, arriving on 25 April 1967.

Following east coast and Caribbean operations, Norris returned to the Mediterranean on 29 April 1968 for duty through the summer months. Returning to Newport in the fall, she deployed again from 9 May through December 1969. Into 1970 she continued on rotation between the 2nd Fleet and 6th Fleet.

== Decommissioning and sale ==
Norris was decommissioned on 4 December 1970, and struck from the Navy List on 1 February 1974. Transferred to Turkey on 1 July 1974 as a spare parts ship to be cannibalized, but after the loss of TCG Kocatepe D354 (ex-USS Harwood DD861 in Turkish service, which is sunk by Turkish warplanes on 21 July 1974 following a mistake), Turkish Navy gave the same name TCG Kocatepe with same hull number D354 to ex-USS Norris. After 20 years of service with Turkish Navy, Kocatepe (ex-USS Norris DD859) was decommissioned and sold as scrap to Hurdasan Anonim Sirketi in June 1994.

== Awards ==
Norris received two battle stars for Korean War service.

USS Norris DD-859 DDE-859 Unit Awards, Campaign and Service Medals and Ribbons

Precedence of awards is from top to bottom, left to right Top Row - Combat Action Ribbon (retroactive Korea) (20 Nov. 1966 Vietnam) 2nd Row - Representative of 1950&60’s Battle Efficiency Awards (Patch) (5) - Navy Expeditionary Medal - China Service Medal (extended) 3rd Row - American Campaign Medal - Asiatic-Pacific Campaign Medal - World War II Victory Medal 4th Row - Navy Occupation Service Medal (with Asia and Europe clasp) - National Defense Service Medal (2) - Korea Service Medal (2) 5th Row - Armed Forces Expeditionary Medal - Vietnam Service Medal (1) - Republic of Korea Presidential Unit Citation 6th Row - Republic of Vietnam Gallantry Cross Unit Citation (21 Jan. 1967) - United Nations Service Medal - Republic of Korea War Service Medal (retroactive)
