= USS Newman K. Perry =

Gearing-class destroyer

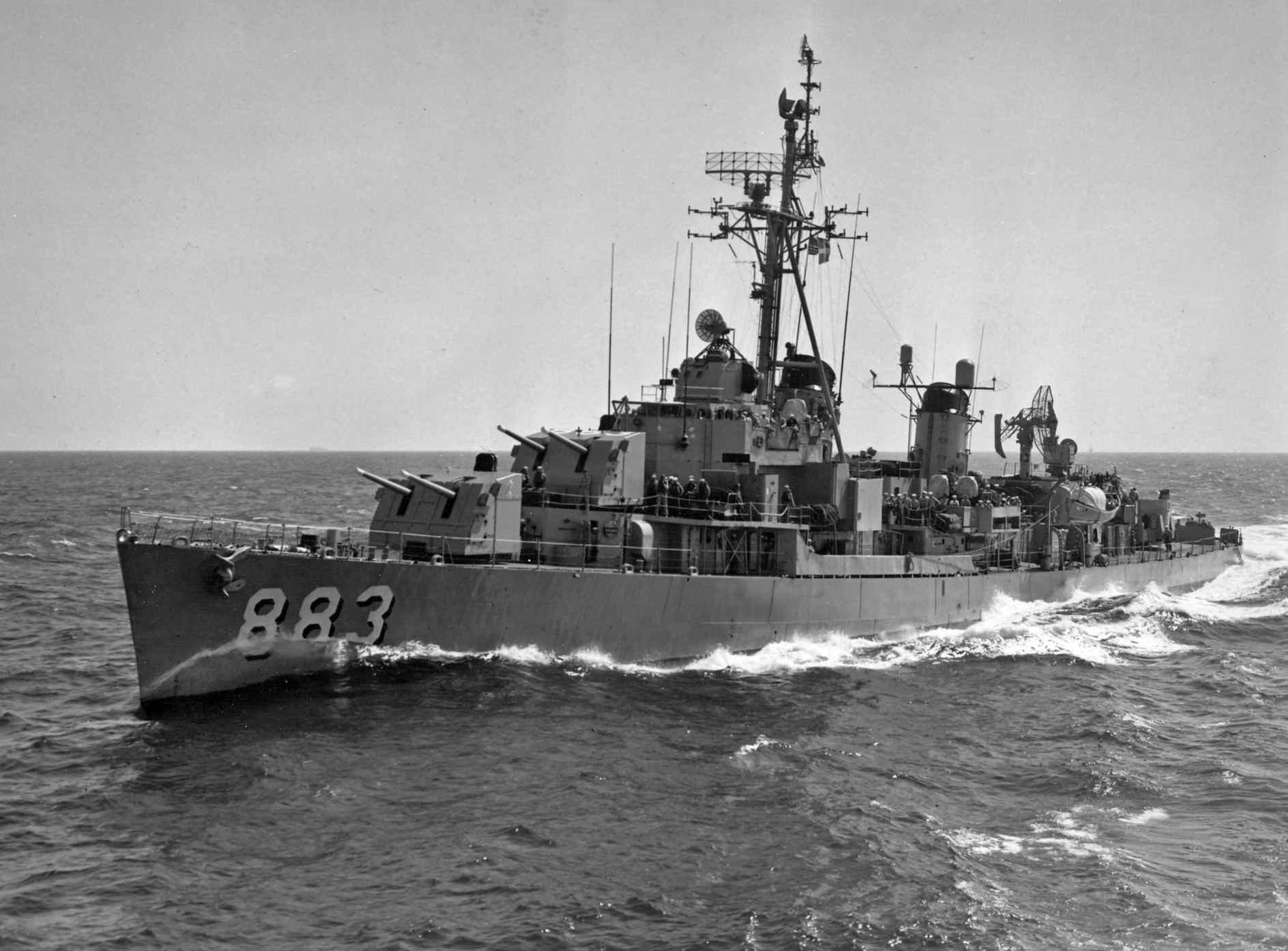
- USS Newman K. Perry underway in late 1950s

History

United States
- Name: Newman K. Perry
- Namesake: Newman Kershaw Perry
- Builder: Consolidated Steel Corporation
- Laid down: 10 October 1944
- Launched: 17 March 1945
- Commissioned: 26 July 1945
- Decommissioned: 27 February 1981
- Reclassified: DDR-883, 1950
- Stricken: 27 February 1981
- Identification: Callsign: NNKP; Hull number: DD-883
- Motto: Pacem et Bellum Gerens Vigilans; (Occupied in War and Watchful in Peace)
- Fate: Transferred to South Korea, 1981
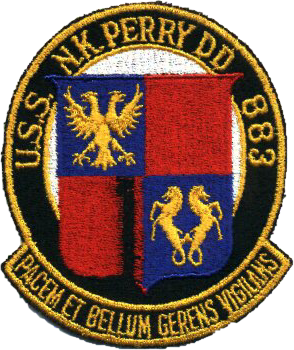
- Badge

South Korea
- Name: Gyeonggi; (경기)
- Namesake: Gyeonggi
- Acquired: 1981
- Commissioned: 1981
- Decommissioned: 1997
- Fate: Scrapped, 1999

General characteristics
- Class & type: Gearing-class destroyer; Kangwon-class destroyer
- Displacement: 2,425 long tons (2,464 t)
- Length: 390 ft 6 in (119.02 m)
- Beam: 40 ft 10 in (12.45 m)
- Draft: 18 ft 6 in (5.64 m)
- Propulsion: Geared turbines, 2 shafts
- Speed: 35 knots (65 km/h; 40 mph)
- Complement: 345
- Armament: 6 × 5"/38 caliber guns; 12 × 40 mm AA guns; 10 × 21 inch (533 mm) torpedo tubes; 6 × depth charge projectors; 2 × depth charge tracks

USS Newman K. Perry (DD-883/DDR-883), was a Gearing-class destroyer of the United States Navy.

== Namesake ==
Newman Kershaw Perry was born on 28 November 1880 in South Carolina. He was appointed Naval Cadet on 9 September 1897 and commissioned Ensign on 7 June 1903. Stationed on the USS Bennington, he was killed by a boiler explosion on that ship at San Diego on 21 July 1905.

== Construction and commissioning ==
Newman K. Perry was laid down by the Consolidated Steel Corporation at Orange, Texas on 10 October 1944, launched on 17 March 1945 by Mrs. Laura P. Gunter, sister of Ensign Perry and commissioned on 26 July 1945.

== Service history ==
=== 1945–1949 ===
Following shakedown, Newman K. Perry served briefly with the Atlantic Fleet. On 7 November 1945, she got underway for Pearl Harbor, whence she traveled to Japan for three months' occupation duty. She returned to Pearl Harbor on 28 March 1946 and was assigned to Joint Task Force 1 for "Operation Crossroads", the 1946 atomic bomb test series at Bikini. Sailing for the Marshall Islands on 27 May, she witnessed tests "Able" and "Baker" and, in August, steamed for the United States.

On 18 August she arrived at San Diego whence she operated until 25 August 1947. Then, with DesDiv 132, she headed west, arriving at Yokosuka on 13 September. Three days later she sailed to Qingdao to commence a series of patrol, escort, search and rescue, ASW, and hydrographic survey missions and exercises along the China coast and off Taiwan and Okinawa. Relieved on 5 May 1948, she returned to San Diego, trained naval reservists through the summer, and in October entered the Mare Island Naval Shipyard for overhaul.

The destroyer departed San Francisco on 15 January 1949 and until April conducted exercises off the west coast. On 4 April, she departed San Diego with DesDiv 182 for Newport, Rhode Island, her new homeport, arriving 21 April.

=== 1950–1968 ===
After her return to Destroyer Forces, Atlantic Fleet, she rotated tours with the 6th Fleet in the Mediterranean Sea and midshipmen and reservist training cruises, and fleet, squadron and type training exercises with the 2nd Fleet. Redesignated a radar picket destroyer in 1950, she conducted her scheduled operations as DDR–883 until 1964 when Newman K. Perry underwent the FRAM I refit at the Boston Naval Shipyard until February 1965. The most visible alteration were the new bridge, the addition of a hangar and landing deck aft for the Gyrodyne QH-50 DASH drone and the addition of an ASROC launcher between the funnels. Modernized into a "regular" destroyer again, she resumed the designation DD-883.

On 12 August 1965 Capt. Robert Carter, Commander Destroyer Squadron 20 embarked on the USS Newman K.Perry, was lost at sea. He was reported missing at 0500, having been last seen at 0100. "With no clue to his disappearance, a massive search of the area, 350 miles north of Bermuda, was launched in heavy seas. Carter's command of six destroyers, a destroyer tender, a Coast Guard cutter and Navy Coast Guard planes joined in the hunt. The ships sailed Monday from here for the Mediterranean and operations with the 6th Fleet. Carter assumed command of the squadron Aug. 3.(In Washington, the Pentagon said there was no indication of foul play in any reports it had received. It pointed out that the weather had been bad in the area.)"

On 26 August 1965, she collided with the aircraft carrier USS Shangri-La off Sardinia, in the Mediterranean, killing one and injuring another. She was repaired at Naples. A change in operations in 1959 took her to Charleston, South Carolina, which served as her homeport for several years before she resumed operations out of Newport.

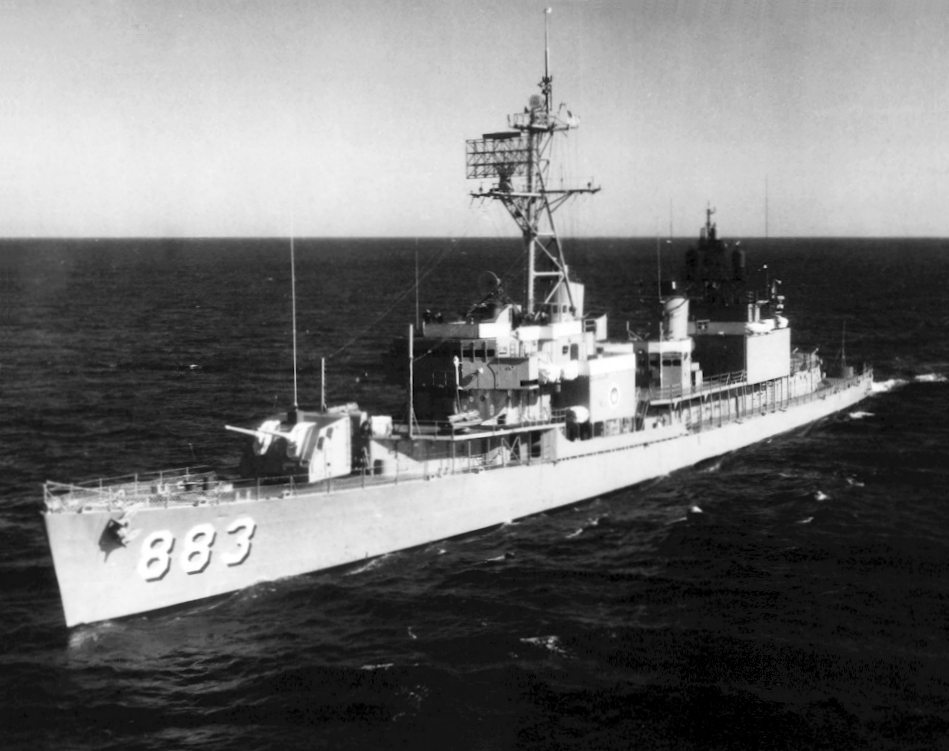
USS Newman K. Perry after her FRAM refit.

A second change in operations took her to the Western Pacific for her overseas deployment in 1966. Departing Newport with Destroyer Division 201 on 4 October, she transited the Panama Canal, stopped in Hawaii, Japan, Okinawa and the Philippines, and arrived on station in the Mekong Delta of South Vietnam on 23 November. Assigned to fire support duties, she shelled enemy coastal storage areas until the 28th. She then shifted to Phú Quốc island, off the Cambodian-South Vietnamese border, to support Vietnamese and Special Forces units for five days, returning to the Delta area in December. Other assignments on that tour with the 7th Fleet took her along the coast to the DMZ and then to the Gulf of Tonkin for plane guard and search and rescue missions. On 8 March 1967, she departed the combat zone for Hong Kong before returning to Subic Bay for the last time. On the 27th she departed the Philippines for the Mediterranean and Newport, arriving on 8 May.

After overhaul at Boston, Newman K. Perry began 1968, with Caribbean exercises and on 4 April departed Newport for the Mediterranean to resume her annual deployments with the 6th Fleet.

=== 1969–1981 ===
In the 1971 Newman K. Perry was assigned to the Naval Reserve Force (NRF) as a unit of Destroyer Squadron 28. She was based in Newport, Rhode Island with a composite crew of active and reserve sailors. In Oct 1974, she hit a buoy foundation in NY harbor, opening a hole in the scoop injection of the forward engine room. After emergency repairs, she spent the night tied to a pier in Hoboken, NJ. Choppy seas from a storm that night broke open a steam pipe in the forward boiler room, as the ship was slammed into the pier for most of the night. A month in drydock at Todd Shipyards in Brooklyn followed. Then she left for Norfolk to test guns, where a forward turret misfired, causing further damage. She was decommissioned and stricken from the Naval Vessel Register on 27 February 1981.

== ROKS Kyong Ki ==
Newman K. Perry was transferred to South Korea in 1981 for service in the Republic of Korea Navy and renamed ROKS Kyong Ki. South Korea decommissioned Kyong Ki in 1997. She later was damaged by fire and scrapped in 1999.
