= Gearing-class destroyer =

Class of American destroyers

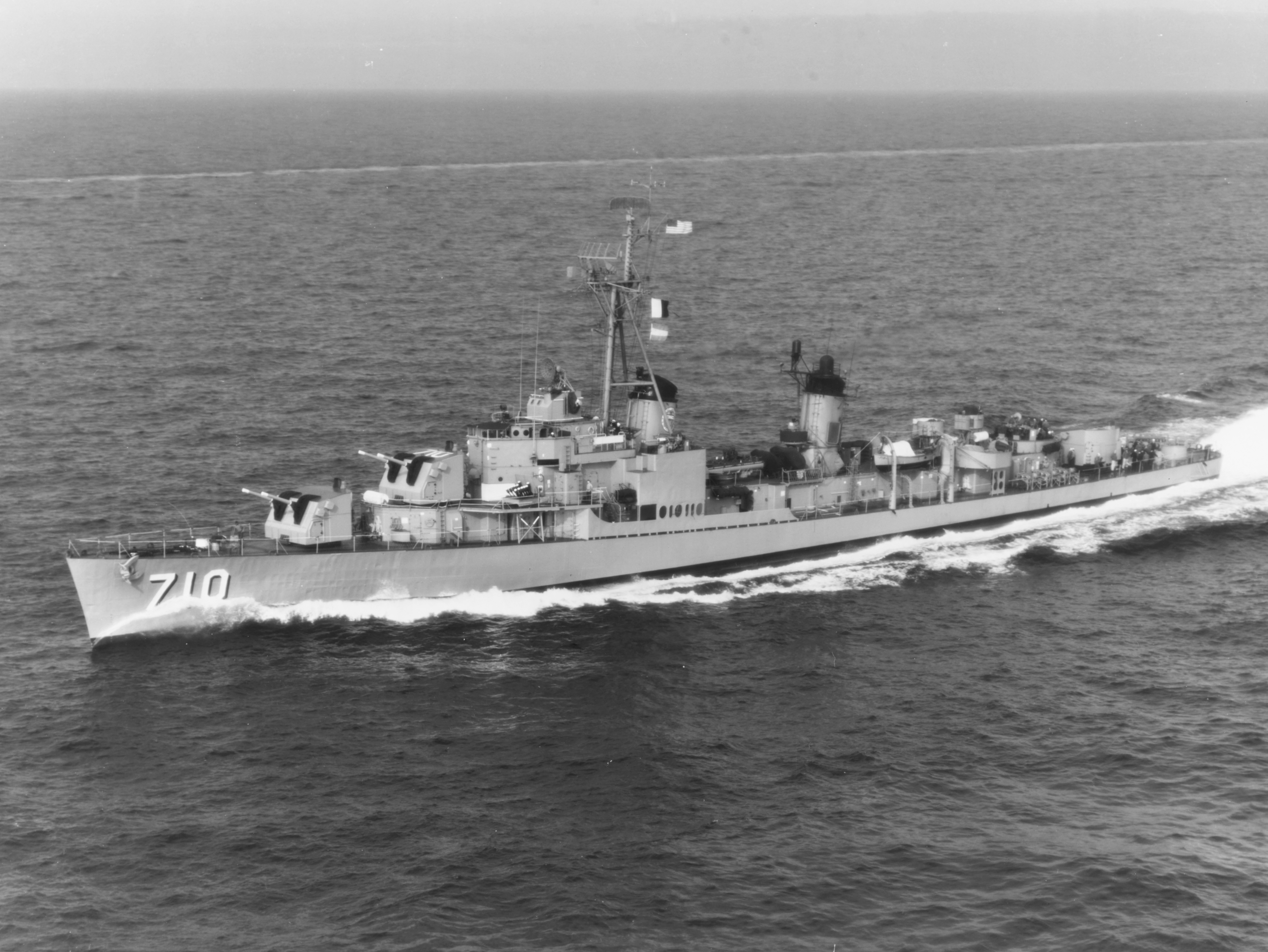
- USS Gearing, 1960

Class overview
- Name: Gearing class
- Builders: Bath Iron Works, ME (30); Consolidated Steel, TX (27); Bethlehem; Staten Island, NY (11); Fore River, MA (4); San Pedro, CA (4); San Francisco, CA (3); Federal Shipbuilding, NJ (10); Todd Pacific Seattle, WA (9)
- Operators: United States Navy; Republic of China Navy; Hellenic Navy; Republic of Korea Navy; Spanish Navy; Turkish Naval Forces; Pakistan Navy; Argentine Navy; Brazilian Navy; Mexican Navy; Ecuadorian Navy; Islamic Republic of Iran Navy
- Preceded by: Allen M. Sumner class
- Succeeded by: Norfolk class
- Subclasses: Churruca class; Chungbuk class; Marcílio Dias class
- In commission: 1945–1983
- Planned: 152
- Completed: 98
- Cancelled: 54
- Lost: 1
- Retired: 98
- Preserved: 5

General characteristics as originally built
- Type: Destroyer
- Displacement: 2,616 long tons (2,658 t) standard; 3,460 long tons (3,520 t) full load
- Length: 390.5 ft (119.0 m)
- Beam: 40.9 ft (12.5 m)
- Draft: 14.3 ft (4.4 m)
- Installed power: 4 × boilers; 60,000 shp (45,000 kW)
- Propulsion: General Electric steam turbines; 2 × shafts
- Speed: 36.8 kn (68.2 km/h; 42.3 mph)
- Range: 4,500 nmi (8,300 km; 5,200 mi) at 20 kn (37 km/h; 23 mph)
- Complement: 350 as designed
- Sensors & processing systems: Mk37 GFCS; 1 × SC radar
- Armament: As built: 6 × 5 in (127 mm)/38 cal guns (in 3 × 2 mounts); 12 × 40 mm (1.57 in) Bofors AA guns (2 × 4 & 2 × 2); 11 × 20 mm (0.79 in) Oerlikon cannons; 2 × Depth charge racks; 6 × K-gun depth charge throwers; 10 × 21 in (533 mm) torpedo tubes; post war configuration: 6 × 5 in/38 cal guns (in 3 × 2 Mk 38 DP mounts); 6 × 3 in (76 mm)/50 cal guns (2 × 2, 2 × 1); 2 × Hedgehog ASW weapons; 1 × Depth charge rack; 6 × K-gun depth charge throwers; Typical after FRAM I (1960-65): 4 × 5 in/38 cal guns (in 2 × 2 Mk 38 DP mounts); 1 × ASROC 8-cell launcher; 2 × triple Mark 32 torpedo tubes for Mark 44 torpedoes; 1 × Drone Anti-Submarine Helicopter (DASH); Variable Depth Sonar (VDS)

The Gearing class was a series of 98 destroyers built for the U.S. Navy during and shortly after World War II. The Gearing design was a minor modification of the Allen M. Sumner class, whereby the hull was lengthened by 14 ft (4.3 m) amidships, which resulted in more fuel storage space and increased the operating range.

The first Gearing ships were not ready for service until mid-1945 and saw little service in World War II. They continued serving, with a series of upgrades, until the 1970s. At that time, many were sold to other nations, where they served many more years.

== Procurement and construction ==
Thirty-one vessels were authorized on 9 July 1942:

- DD-710 to DD-721 were awarded to Federal Shipbuilding, Kearny.
- DD-742 to DD-743 were awarded to Bath Iron Works, Bath, Maine.
- DD-763 to DD-769 were awarded to Bethlehem Steel, San Francisco.
- DD-782 to DD-791 were awarded to Todd Pacific Shipyards, Seattle.

Four vessels were authorized on 13 May 1943:

- DD-805 to DD-808 were awarded to Bath Iron Works, Bath, Maine.

Three vessels were authorized on 27 March 1943 under the Vinson–Trammell Act:

- DD-809 to DD-811 were awarded to Bath Iron Works, Bath, Maine. (later cancelled)

The remaining 114 vessels were authorized on 19 July 1943 under the 70% Expansion Act:

- DD-812 awarded to Bath Iron Works, Bath, Maine. (later cancelled)
- DD-813 to DD-814 were awarded to Bethlehem Steel, Staten Island. (later cancelled)
- DD-815 to DD-825 were awarded to Consolidated Steel, Orange. (815 and 816 later cancelled)
- DD-826 to DD-849 were awarded to Bath Iron Works, Bath, Maine.
- DD-850 to DD-853 were awarded to Bethlehem Steel, Fore River Shipyard, Quincy.
- DD-854 to DD-856 were awarded to Bethlehem Steel, Staten Island. (later cancelled)
- DD-858 to DD-861 were awarded to Bethlehem Steel, San Pedro.
- DD-862 to DD-872 were awarded to Bethlehem Steel, Staten Island.
- DD-873 to DD-890 were awarded to Consolidated Steel, Orange.
- DD-891 to DD-893 were awarded to Federal Shipbuilding, Kearny. (later cancelled)
- DD-894 to DD-895 were awarded to Consolidated Steel, Orange. (later cancelled)
- DD-896 to DD-904 were awarded to Bath Iron Works, Bath, Maine. (later cancelled)
- DD-905 to DD-908 were awarded to Boston Navy Yard. (later cancelled)
- DD-909 to DD-916 were awarded to Bethlehem Steel, Staten Island. (later cancelled)
- DD-917 to DD-924 were awarded to Consolidated Steel, Orange. (later cancelled)
- DD-925 to DD-926 were awarded to Charleston Navy Yard. (later cancelled)

(Of the missing numbers in this sequence, 722 to 741, 744 to 762, 770 to 781, and 857, all were allocated to orders for Allen M. Sumner-class destroyers; 792 to 804 were awarded to orders for Fletcher-class destroyers.)

== Cancelled vessels ==
In March 1945, the orders for 36 of the above vessels were cancelled, and 11 more orders were cancelled in August 1945. Following the close of World War II, seven further vessels were cancelled in 1946:

- USS Castle (DD-720) and Woodrow R. Thompson (DD-721), the last pair of the 12 vessels launched by Federal Shipbuilding at Kearny, were cancelled on 11 February 1946. They were sold on 29 August 1955 and scrapped.
- USS Lansdale (DD-766) and USS Seymour D. Owens (DD-767), both launched by Bethlehem at San Francisco, were cancelled on 7 January 1946. Their bows were used to repair other destroyers, and their remains were scrapped in 1958–1959.
- USS Hoel (DD-768) and USS Abner Read (DD-769), both being building by Bethlehem at San Francisco, were cancelled on 12 September 1946, prior to launch, and broken up on the slip.
- USS Seaman (DD-791) was built by Todd Pacific Shipyards at Seattle; partially completed, she was put in reserve on 25 June 1946, sold on 12 September 1961, and scrapped on 22 September 1961.
- Four unnamed vessels (DD-809 to DD-812) were awarded to Bath Iron Works, and five others (DD-813, DD-814, and DD-854 to DD-856)

were awarded to Bethlehem at Staten Island; they were cancelled on 12 August 1945.

- Charles H. Roan (DD-815) and Timmerman (DD-816), both awarded to Consolidated Steel Corporation at Orange, were also cancelled on 12 August 1945. Their names were reallocated to Charles H. Roan and Timmerman, respectively.
- Three more unnamed vessels (DD-891 to DD-893) were awarded to Federal Shipbuilding at Kearney and were cancelled on 8 March 1945.
- Ten more unnamed vessels (DD-894, DD-895, and DD-917 to DD-924) were awarded to Consolidated Steel Corporation at Orange, and four more (DD-905 to DD-908) were awarded to Boston Navy Yard, and another two (DD-925 and DD-926) were awarded to Charleston Navy Yard; all were all cancelled on 27 March 1945.
- Nine more unnamed vessels (DD-896 to DD-904) awarded to Bath Iron Works, and another eight (DD-909 to DD-916) awarded to Bethlehem at Staten Island, were all cancelled on 28 March 1945.

== Design ==
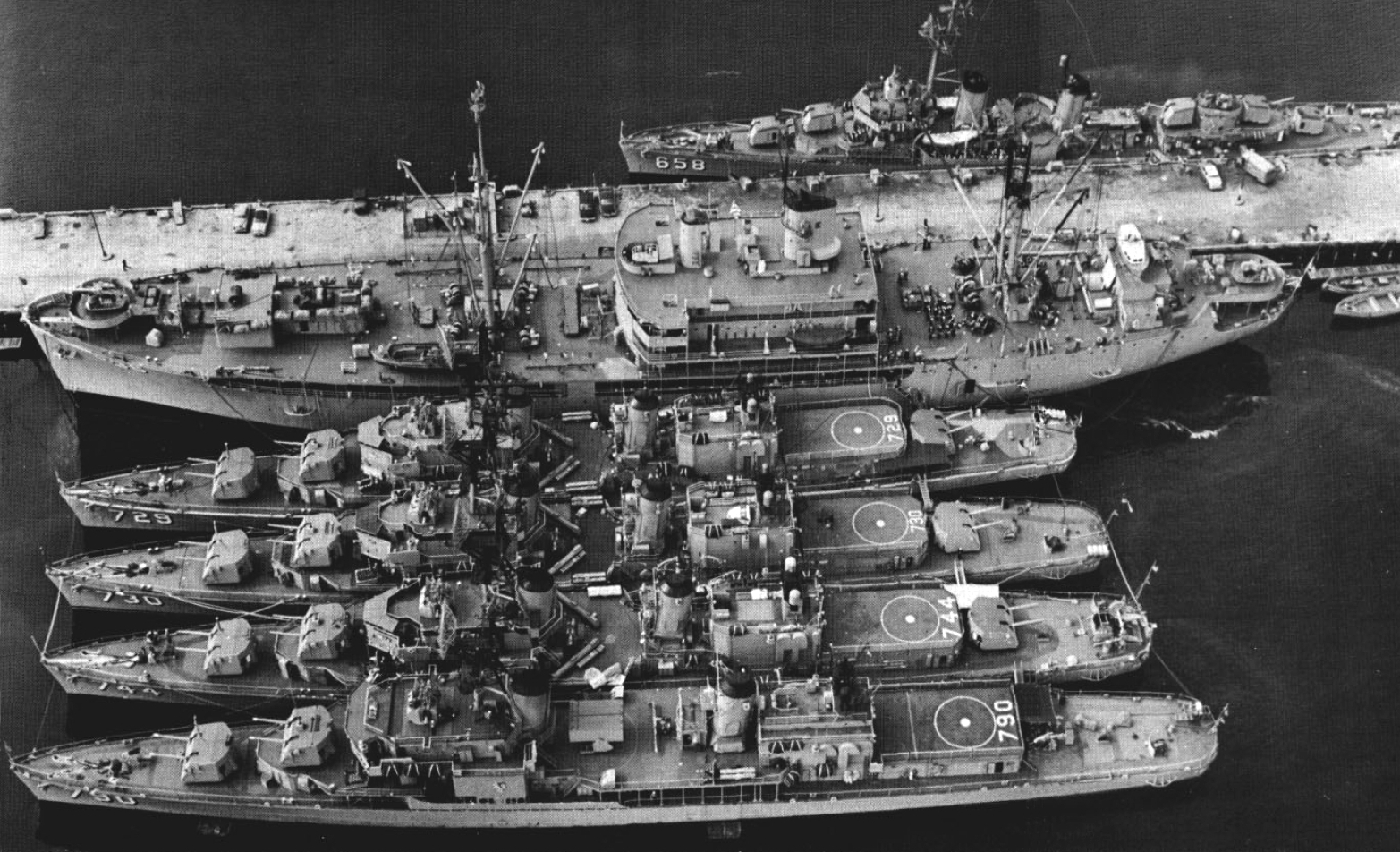
Three Allen M. Sumner-class destroyers (Lyman K. Swenson, Collett and Blue) alongside the slightly longer Gearing-class destroyer Shelton in 1962

The first ship was laid down in August 1944, while the last was launched in March 1946. In that time, the United States produced 98 Gearing-class destroyers. The Gearing class was a seemingly minor improvement of the Allen M. Sumner class, built from 1943 until 1945. The main differences were that the Gearing ships were 14 ft (4.3 m) longer in the midship section, allowing for increased fuel storage for greater range, an important consideration in the Pacific War. More importantly in the long run, their increased size made them much more suitable for upgrades than the Allen M. Sumner class, as seen in the wartime radar picket subclass, the 1950s radar picket destroyer (DDR) and escort destroyer (DDE) conversions, and the fleet rehabilitation and modernization (FRAM) conversions 1960-1965. As designed, the Gearing class's armament was identical to that on the Allen M. Sumner class. Three twin 5 in (127 mm)/38 caliber Mark 38 dual purpose (DP) mounts constituted the main battery. The 5-inch guns were guided by a Mark 37 Gun fire-control system with a Mark 25 fire-control radar linked by a Mark 1A fire control computer stabilized by a Mark 6 8,500 rpm gyroscope. This fire-control system provided effective long-range antiaircraft (AA) or antisurface fire. Twelve 40 mm (1.57 in) Bofors guns in two quadruple and two twin mounts and 11 20 mm (0.79 in) Oerlikon cannons in single mounts were also equipped. The initial design retained the Allen M. Sumner class's heavy torpedo armament of 10 21-inch (530 mm) torpedo tubes in two quintuple mounts, firing the Mark 15 torpedo. As the threat from kamikaze aircraft mounted in 1945, and with few remaining Japanese warships on which to use torpedoes, most of the class had the aft quintuple 21-inch tube mounts replaced by an additional 40 mm quadruple mount (prior to completion on later ships) for 16 total 40 mm guns. Twenty-four ships (DD-742, DD743, 805-808, 829, 831-835, and 874-883) were ordered without torpedo tubes to allow for radar picket equipment; these were redesignated as DDRs in 1948.

=== 1946–1959 upgrades ===
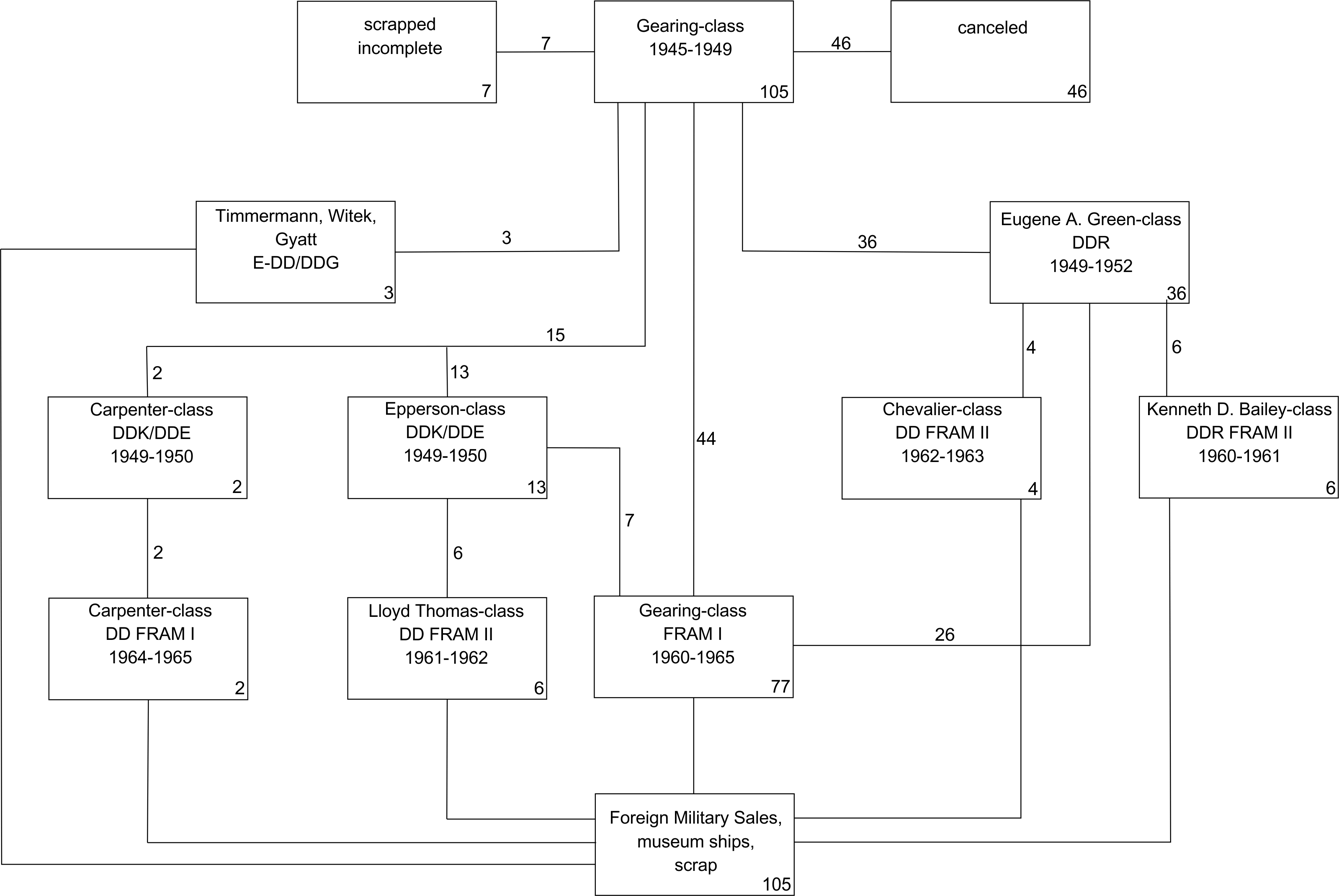
Chart showing the development of the Gearing class

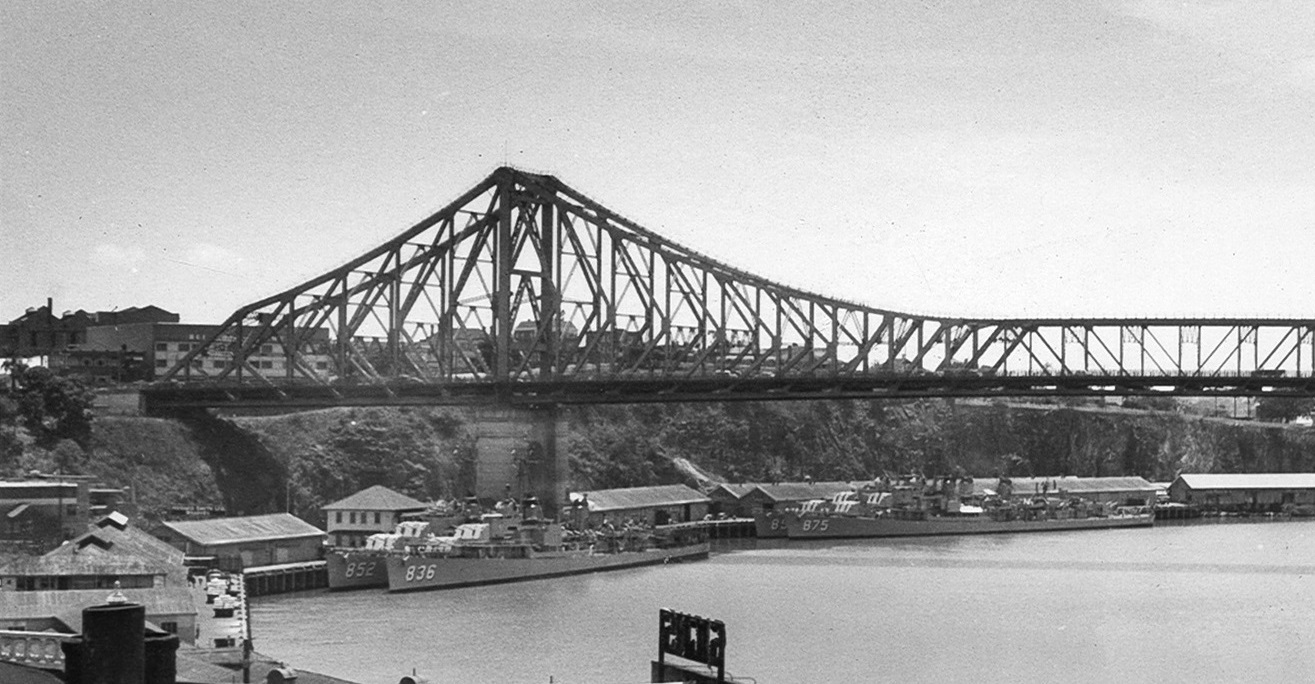
George K. MacKenzie, Leonard F. Mason, Henry W. Tucker, and Rupertus under the Story Bridge, Brisbane, Australia in January 1958

Following World War II, most of the class had their AA and antisubmarine warfare (ASW) armament upgraded. The 40 mm and 20 mm guns were replaced by two to six 3-inch (76 mm)/50 caliber guns in up to two twin and two single mountings. One depth-charge rack was removed and two Hedgehog ASW mortar mounts were added. The K-guns were retained. Nine additional (for a total of 35) ships were converted to radar picket destroyers (DDR) in the early 1950s; these typically received only one 3-inch twin mount to save weight for radar equipment, as did the wartime radar pickets. Nine ships were converted to escort destroyers (DDE), emphasizing ASW. Carpenter was the most thorough DDE conversion, with four 3-inch/70 caliber guns in twin enclosed mounts, two Weapon Alpha launchers, four new 21-inch torpedo tubes for the Mark 37 ASW torpedo, and one depth-charge rack.

== FRAM I upgrade ==
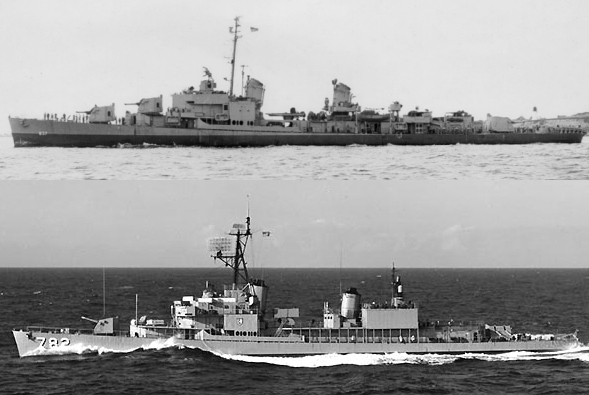
Sarsfield (top) as delivered and Rowan (bottom) after FRAM I.

In the late 1950s and early 1960s, 79 of the Gearing-class destroyers underwent extensive modernization overhauls, known as FRAM I, which were designed under project SCB 206 to convert them from an AA destroyer to an ASW platform. FRAM I removed all of the DDR and DDE equipment, and these ships were redesignated as DDs. FRAM I and FRAM II conversions were completed 1960–1965. Eventually, all but three Gearing ships received FRAM conversions.

The FRAM I program was an extensive conversion for the Gearing-class destroyers. This upgrade included rebuilding the ship's superstructure, electronic systems, radar, sonar, and weapons. The second twin 5-inch gun mount and all previous AA guns and ASW equipment were removed. On several ships, the two forward 5-inch mounts remained and the aft 5-inch mount was removed. Upgraded systems included SQS-23 sonar, SPS-10 surface search radar, two triple Mark 32 torpedo tubes, an eight-cell antisubmarine rocket (ASROC) box launcher, and one QH-50C DASH ASW drone helicopter, with its own landing pad and hangar. Both the Mk 32 torpedo tubes and ASROC launched Mk. 44 homing ASW torpedoes. ASROC could also launch a nuclear depth charge. On 11 May 1962, Agerholm tested a live nuclear ASROC in the Swordfish test.

In Navy slang, the modified destroyers were called "FRAM cans", "can" being a contraction of "tin can", the slang term for a destroyer or destroyer escort.

The Gyrodyne QH-50C DASH was an unmanned antisubmarine helicopter, controlled remotely from the ship. The drone could carry two Mark 44 homing ASW torpedoes. During this era, the ASROC system had an effective range of only 5 nautical miles (9.3 km; 5.8 mi), but the DASH drone allowed the ship to deploy ASW attack to sonar contacts as far as 22 nmi (41 km; 25 mi) away. However, DASH proved unreliable in shipboard service, with over half of the Navy's 746 drones lost at sea. This was possibly due to inadequate maintenance support, as other services had few difficulties with DASH. By 1970, DASH had been withdrawn from FRAM I ships, though it was retained into the early 1970s on FRAM II ships, which lacked ASROC. A limitation of drones in ASW was the need to reacquire the target at ranges beyond the effectiveness of the controlling ship's sonar. This led to shift to the LAMPS program of manned helicopters, which the Gearing class were too small to accommodate.

An upgraded version of DASH, QH-50D, remained in use by the United States Army until May 2006.

FRAM I "A" ships (first eight conversions) had the removal of their aft twin 5-inch gun mounts (Mount 53). Group A ships also received two MK10/11 Hedgehogs fitted on each side of the bridge at the 01 level and had the MK-32 triple torpedo launchers aft of the second stack. FRAM I "B" ships (remainder of conversions) kept their forward 5-inch mount (Mount 51), lost the second mount (Mount 52), and kept their aft 5-inch mount (Mount 53). In place of mount 52, a practice 5-inch reloading machine was installed with the MK-32 triple torpedo launchers aft of the loader. Group B ships also received greater ASROC and torpedo storage areas next to the port side of the DASH hangar.

== FRAM II upgrade ==
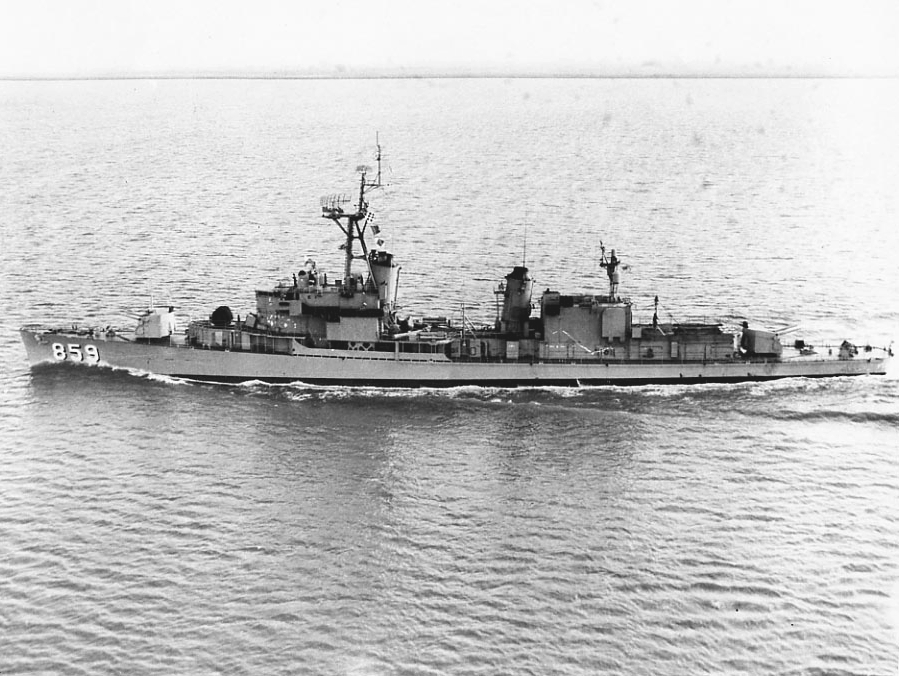
Norris after FRAM II.

The FRAM II program was designed primarily for the Allen M. Sumner-class destroyer, but 16 Gearing ships were upgraded, as well. This upgrade program included life-extension refurbishment, a new radar system, Mark 32 torpedo tubes, DASH ASW drone, and variable depth sonar. Importantly, it did not include ASROC. FRAM II ships included six DDRs and six DDEs that retained their specialized equipment (1960–1961), as well as four DDRs that were converted to DDs and were nearly identical to the Allen M. Sumner-class FRAM IIs (1962–1963). The FRAM II ships retained all six 5-inch guns, except the DDEs retained four 5-inch guns and a trainable Hedgehog in the No. 2 position. All FRAM IIs retained two Hedgehogs alongside either the No. 2 5-inch mount or the trainable Hedgehog mount. The four DDRs converted to DDs were armed with two new 21-inch torpedo tubes for the Mk. 37 ASW homing torpedo. Photographs of the six retained DDRs show no markings on the DASH landing deck, as well as a much smaller deckhouse than was usually provided for DASH, so they may not have been equipped with DASH.

== Service and disposition ==
Many of the Gearing ships provided significant gunfire support in the Vietnam War. They also served as escorts for carrier battle groups (carrier strike groups from 2004) and amphibious ready groups (expeditionary strike groups from 2006). DASH was withdrawn from ASW service in 1969, due to poor reliability. Lacking ASROC, the FRAM II ships were disposed of in 1969–1974. With ASROC continuing to provide a standoff ASW capability, the Gearing FRAM Is were retained in service for several years, with most being decommissioned and transferred to foreign navies from 1973–1980. They were replaced as ASW ships by the Spruance-class destroyers, which were commissioned 1975–1983. These had the same ASW armament as a Gearing FRAM destroyer, with the addition of improved sonar and a piloted helicopter, initially the Kaman SH-2 Seasprite, and from 1984, the Sikorsky SH-60 Seahawk. Some Gearing ships served in the Naval Reserve Force from 1973, remaining in commission with a partial active crew to provide training for naval reservists. The last Gearing-class destroyer in US naval service was William C. Lawe, a FRAM I, decommissioned and struck 1 October 1983, and expended as a target 14 July 1999.

== Yang class ==
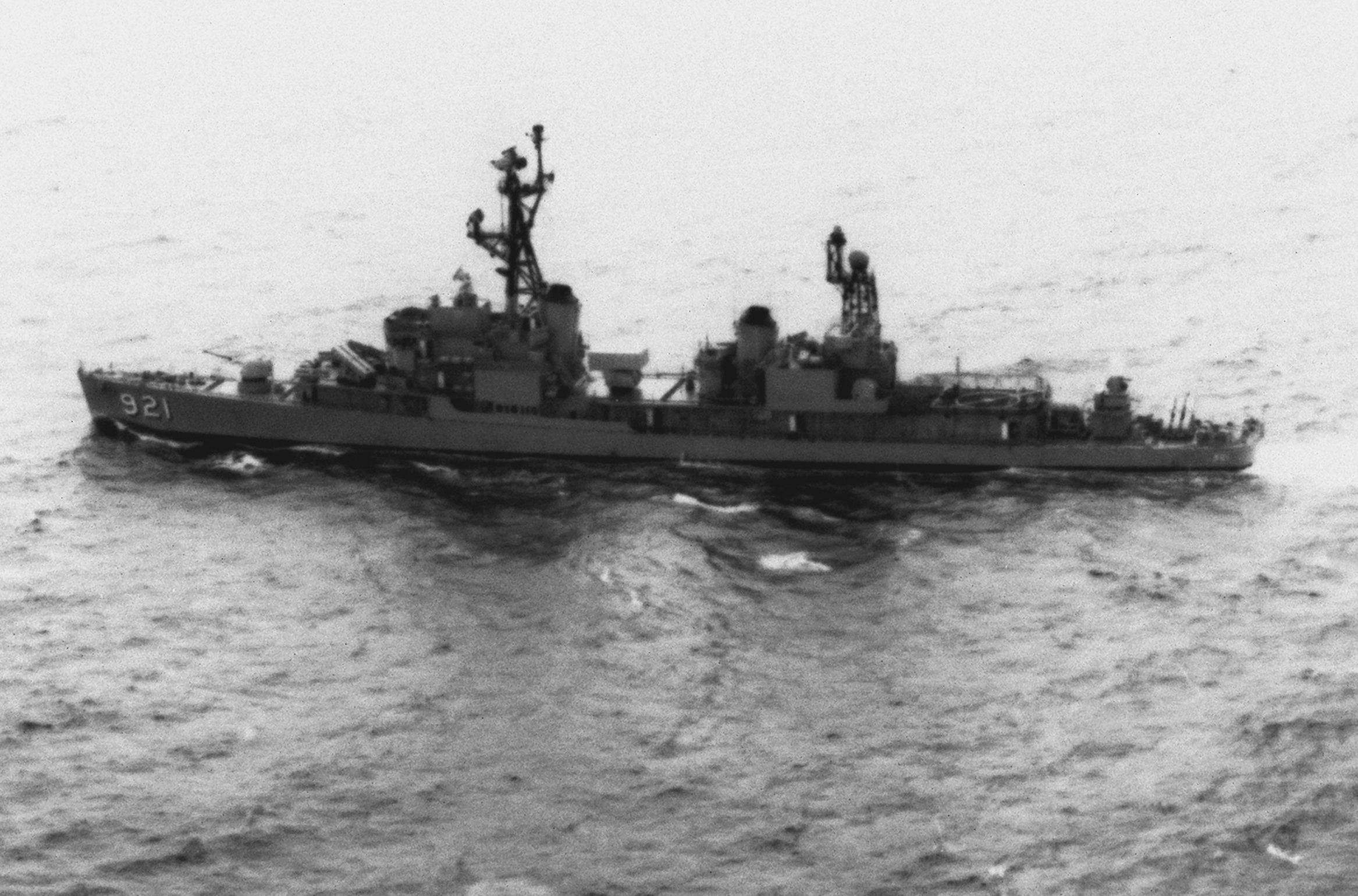
The Taiwanese destroyer Liao Yang (ex Hanson)

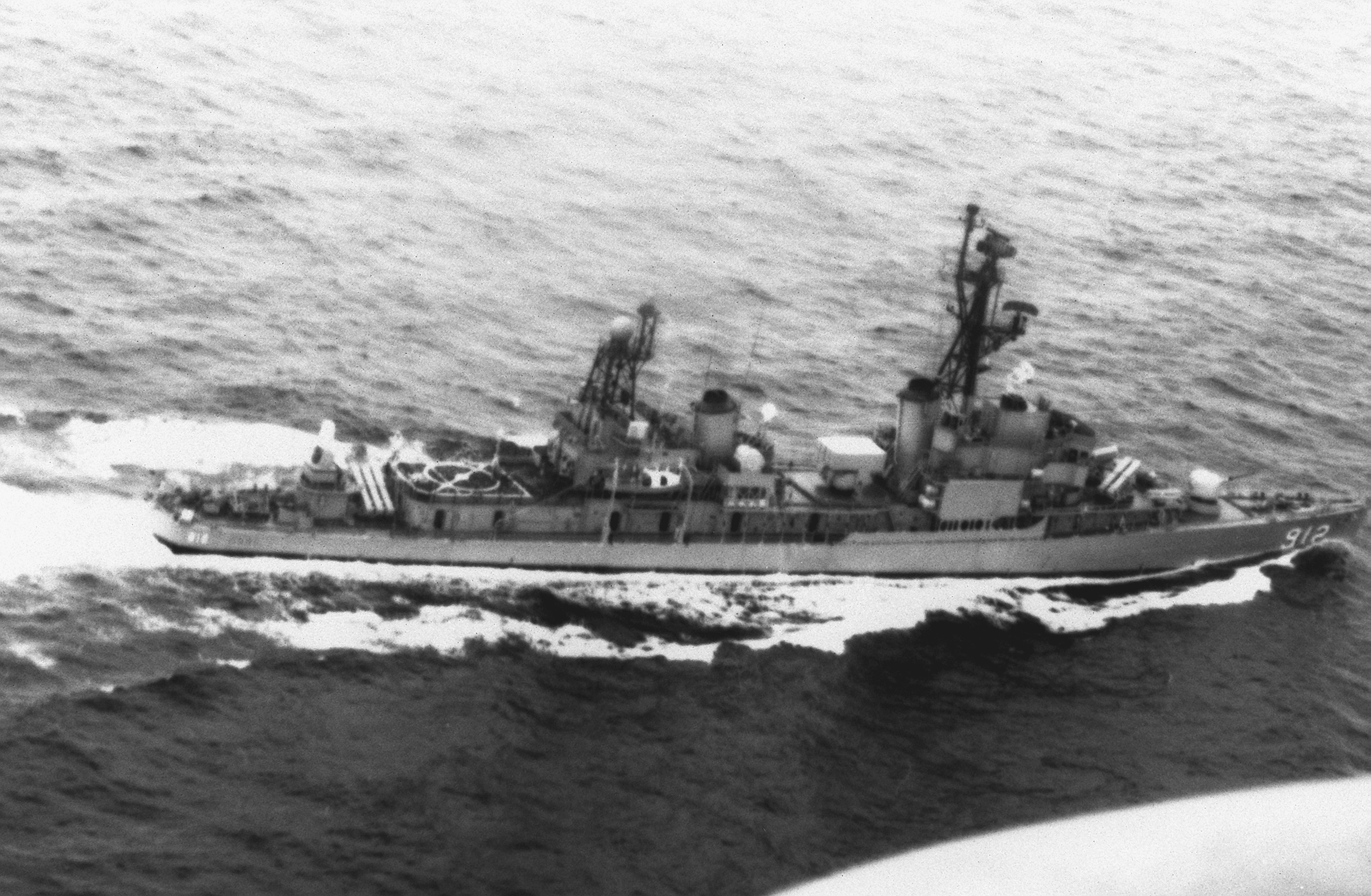
The Taiwanese destroyer Chien Yang (ex James E. Kyes)

After the Gearing-class ships were retired from USN service, many were sold abroad, including over a dozen to the Republic of China Navy (ROCN) in Taiwan. These ships, along with Fletcher-class destroyers and Allen M. Sumner-class destroyers also acquired then, were upgraded under the Wu Chin (Chinese: 武進) I, II, and III programs and known throughout the ROCN as the Yang-class (Chinese: 陽字號) destroyers, as they were assigned names that all end with the word "Yang". The class is sometimes referred to as the Chao Yang class, after the lead ship. The last batch of 7 WC-III program vessels, all of them Gearing class, were retired in the early 2000s.

Under the most advanced Wu Chin III upgrade program, all World War II-vintage weapons were removed and replaced with four Hsiung Feng II surface-to-surface missiles (in a single quad launcher), 10 SM-1 missiles (using the Mark 32 box launcher, in two twin and two triple variants), one eight-cell ASROC (amidships, as with FRAM I), one 76 mm (3 in) Otobreda gun (in place of the A turret), two Bofors 40mm L/70 AA, one 20 mm Phalanx CIWS on the stern, and two triple 12.75 in (324 mm) torpedo tubes (as with FRAM I). The DASH ASW drones were not acquired, but hangar facilities aboard those ships that had them were later used to accommodate of MD 500/ASW helicopters.

After the Yang-class destroyers were decommissioned, the SM-1 launch boxes were moved to Chi Yang-class frigates to improve their antiair capability.

== Ships in class ==
Ships of the Gearing destroyer class
Name	Hull no.	Builder	Laid down	Launched	Commissioned	FRAM	Decommissioned	Fate
USS Gearing	DD-710	Federal Shipbuilding and Drydock Company, Newark, New Jersey	10 August 1944	18 February 1945	3 May 1945	IB	2 July 1973	Sold for scrap, 6 November 1974
USS Eugene A. Greene	DD-711	Federal Shipbuilding and Drydock Company, Newark, New Jersey	17 August 1944	18 March 1945	8 June 1945	IB	31 August 1972	Transferred to Spain, 31 August 1972
USS Gyatt	DD-712	Federal Shipbuilding and Drydock Company, Newark, New Jersey	7 September 1944	15 April 1945	2 July 1945		22 October 1969	Sunk as a target, 11 June 1970
USS Kenneth D. Bailey	DD-713 / DDR-713	Federal Shipbuilding and Drydock Company, Newark, New Jersey	21 September 1944	17 June 1945	31 July 1945	II	20 January 1970	Sold to Iran, 13 January 1975, to be broken up for spare parts
USS William R. Rush	DD-714	Federal Shipbuilding and Drydock Company, Newark, New Jersey	19 October 1944	8 July 1945	21 September 1945	IB	1 July 1978	Transferred to South Korea in 1978; retired in 2000; became museum ship; scrapped December 2016
USS William M. Wood	DD-715	Federal Shipbuilding and Drydock Company, Newark, New Jersey	2 November 1944	29 July 1945	24 November 1945	IB	1 December 1976	Sunk as target off Puerto Rico during ReadEx 1–83 in March 1983
USS Wiltsie	DD-716	Federal Shipbuilding and Drydock Company, Newark, New Jersey	13 March 1945	31 August 1945	12 January 1946	IB	23 January 1976	Sold to Pakistan, 29 April 1977
USS Theodore E. Chandler	DD-717	Federal Shipbuilding and Drydock Company, Newark, New Jersey	23 April 1945	20 October 1945	22 March 1946	IB	1 April 1975	Sold for scrap, 30 December 1975
USS Hamner	DD-718	Federal Shipbuilding and Drydock Company, Newark, New Jersey	25 April 1945	24 November 1945	12 July 1946	IB	1 October 1979	Sold to Taiwan, 17 December 1980
USS Epperson	DD-719 DDE-719	Federal Shipbuilding and Drydock Company, Newark, New Jersey	20 June 1945	22 December 1945	19 March 1949	IB	1 December 1975	Transferred to Pakistan, 29 April 1977
USS Frank Knox	DD-742 DDR-742	Bath Iron Works, Bath, Maine	8 May 1944	17 September 1944	11 December 1944	II	30 January 1971	Transferred to Greece, 3 February 1971
USS Southerland	DD-743	Bath Iron Works, Bath, Maine	27 May 1944	5 October 1944	22 December 1944	IB	26 February 1981	Sunk as a target, 2 August 1997
USS William C. Lawe	DD-763	Bethlehem Shipbuilding Corporation, San Francisco, California	12 March 1944	21 May 1945	18 December 1946	IB	1 October 1983	Sunk as a target, 14 July 1999
USS Lloyd Thomas	DD-764 DDE-764	Bethlehem Shipbuilding Corporation, San Francisco, California	26 March 1944	5 October 1945	21 March 1947	II	12 October 1972	Sold to Taiwan, 12 October 1972
USS Keppler	DD-765 DDE-765	Bethlehem Shipbuilding Corporation, San Francisco, California	23 April 1944	24 June 1946	23 May 1947	II	1 July 1972	Sold to Turkey
USS Rowan	DD-782	Todd Pacific Shipyards, Seattle, Washington	25 March 1944	29 December 1944	31 March 1945	IB	18 December 1975	Ran aground and wrecked while under tow, 22 August 1977
USS Gurke	DD-783	Todd Pacific Shipyards, Seattle, Washington	1 July 1944	15 February 1945	12 May 1945	IB	30 January 1976	Transferred to Greece, 17 March 1977
USS McKean	DD-784	Todd Pacific Shipyards, Seattle, Washington	15 September 1944	31 March 1945	9 June 1945	IB	1 October 1981	Transferred to Turkey, 2 November 1982
USS Henderson	DD-785	Todd Pacific Shipyards, Seattle, Washington	27 October 1944	28 May 1945	4 August 1945	IB	30 September 1980	Sold to Pakistan, 1 October 1980
USS Richard B. Anderson	DD-786	Todd Pacific Shipyards, Seattle, Washington	1 December 1944	7 July 1945	26 October 1945	IA	20 December 1975	Transferred to Republic of China, 1 June 1977
USS James E. Kyes	DD-787	Todd Pacific Shipyards, Seattle, Washington	27 December 1944	4 August 1945	8 February 1946	IB	31 March 1973	Transferred to Taiwan, 18 April 1973
USS Hollister	DD-788	Todd Pacific Shipyards, Seattle, Washington	18 January 1945	9 October 1945	29 March 1946	IB	31 August 1979	Transferred to Taiwan, 3 March 1983
USS Eversole	DD-789	Todd Pacific Shipyards, Seattle, Washington	28 February 1945	8 January 1946	10 May 1946	IB	11 July 1973	Transferred to Turkey, 11 July 1973
USS Shelton	DD-790	Todd Pacific Shipyards, Seattle, Washington	31 May 1945	8 March 1946	21 June 1946	IA	31 March 1973	Sold to Taiwan, 18 April 1973
USS Chevalier	DD-805 DDR-805	Bath Iron Works, Bath, Maine	12 June 1944	29 October 1944	9 January 1945	II	5 July 1972	Transferred to South Korea, 5 July 1972
USS Higbee	DD-806	Bath Iron Works, Bath, Maine	26 June 1944	13 November 1944	27 January 1945	IB	15 July 1979	Sunk as a target, 24 April 1986
USS Benner	DD-807 DDR-807	Bath Iron Works, Bath, Maine	10 July 1944	30 November 1944	13 February 1945	II	20 November 1970	Sold for scrap, 18 April 1975
USS Dennis J. Buckley	DD-808	Bath Iron Works, Bath, Maine	24 July 1944	20 December 1944	2 March 1945	IB	2 July 1973	Sold for scrap, 29 April 1974
USS Corry	DD-817	Consolidated Steel Corporation, Orange, Texas	5 April 1945	28 July 1945	27 February 1946	IB	27 February 1981	Transferred to Greece, 8 July 1981
USS New	DD-818	Consolidated Steel Corporation, Orange, Texas	14 April 1945	18 August 1945	5 April 1946	IB	1 July 1976	Transferred to South Korea, 23 February 1977
USS Holder	DD-819	Consolidated Steel Corporation, Orange, Texas	23 April 1945	25 August 1945	18 May 1946	IB	1 October 1976	Transferred to Ecuador, 23 February 1977
USS Rich	DD-820	Consolidated Steel Corporation, Orange, Texas	16 May 1945	5 October 1945	3 July 1946	IB	10 November 1977	Sold for scrap, 5 December 1979
USS Johnston	DD-821	Consolidated Steel Corporation, Orange, Texas	26 March 1945	10 October 1945	23 August 1946	IB	27 February 1981	Transferred to Republic of China, 27 February 1981
USS Robert H. McCard	DD-822	Consolidated Steel Corporation, Orange, Texas	20 June 1945	9 November 1945	23 October 1946	IB	5 June 1980	Transferred to Turkey, 5 June 1980
USS Samuel B. Roberts	DD-823	Consolidated Steel Corporation, Orange, Texas	27 June 1945	30 November 1945	22 December 1946	IB	2 November 1970	Sunk as a target, 14 November 1971
USS Basilone	DD-824 DDE-824	Consolidated Steel Corporation, Orange, Texas	7 July 1945	21 December 1945	26 July 1949	IB	1 November 1977	Sunk in exercise, 9 April 1982
USS Carpenter	DD-825 DDK-825 DDE-825	Consolidated Steel Corporation, Orange, Texas	30 July 1945	30 December 1945	15 December 1949	IB	20 February 1981	Leased to Turkey, 20 February 1981
USS Agerholm	DD-826	Bath Iron Works, Bath, Maine	10 September 1945	30 March 1946	20 June 1946	IA	1 December 1978	Sunk as a target, 18 July 1982
USS Robert A. Owens	DD-827 DDK-827 DDE-827	Bath Iron Works, Bath, Maine	29 October 1945	15 July 1946	5 November 1949	IB	16 February 1982	Transferred to Turkey, 16 February 1982
USS Timmerman	DD-828	Bath Iron Works, Bath, Maine	1 October 1945	19 May 1951	26 September 1952		27 July 1956	Sold for scrap, 21 April 1959
USS Myles C. Fox	DD-829	Bath Iron Works, Bath, Maine	14 August 1944	13 January 1945	20 March 1945	IB	1 October 1979	Transferred to Greece for spare parts, 2 August 1980
USS Everett F. Larson	DD-830 DDR-830	Bath Iron Works, Bath, Maine	4 September 1944	28 January 1945	6 April 1945	II	30 October 1972	Transferred to South Korea, 30 October 1972
USS Goodrich	DD-831 DDR-831	Bath Iron Works, Bath, Maine	18 September 1944	25 February 1945	24 April 1945	II	30 November 1969	Sold for scrap, 12 September 1977
USS Hanson	DD-832	Bath Iron Works, Bath, Maine	7 October 1944	11 March 1945	11 May 1945	IB	31 March 1973	Transferred to Republic of China, 18 April 1973
USS Herbert J. Thomas	DD-833	Bath Iron Works, Bath, Maine	30 October 1944	25 March 1945	29 May 1945	IB	4 December 1970	Transferred to Republic of China, 1 June 1974
USS Turner	DD-834 DDR-834	Bath Iron Works, Bath, Maine	13 November 1944	8 April 1945	12 June 1945	II	26 September 1969	Sold for scrap, 13 October 1970
USS Charles P. Cecil	DD-835	Bath Iron Works, Bath, Maine	2 December 1944	2 April 1945	29 June 1945	IB	1 October 1979	Sold to Greece, 8 August 1980
USS George K. MacKenzie	DD-836	Bath Iron Works, Bath, Maine	21 December 1944	13 May 1945	13 July 1945	IB	30 September 1976	Sunk as a target, 15 October 1976
USS Sarsfield	DD-837	Bath Iron Works, Bath, Maine	15 January 1945	27 May 1945	31 July 1945	IB	1 October 1977	Transferred to Republic of China, 1 October 1977 and become museum at An-Pin harbor TAI-NAN, TAIWAN.
USS Ernest G. Small	DD-838 DDR-838	Bath Iron Works, Bath, Maine	30 January 1945	14 June 1945	21 August 1945	II	13 November 1970	Transferred to Republic of China, 13 April 1971
USS Power	DD-839	Bath Iron Works, Bath, Maine	26 February 1945	30 June 1945	13 September 1945	IB	1 October 1977	Sold to Republic of China, 1 October 1977
USS Glennon	DD-840	Bath Iron Works, Bath, Maine	12 March 1945	14 July 1945	4 October 1945	IB	1 October 1976	Sunk as a target, 26 February 1981
USS Noa	DD-841	Bath Iron Works, Bath, Maine	26 March 1945	30 July 1945	2 November 1945	IA	31 October 1973	Loaned to Spain, 31 October 1973; Sold, 17 May 1978
USS Fiske	DD-842	Bath Iron Works, Bath, Maine	9 April 1945	8 September 1945	28 November 1945	IB	5 June 1980	Transferred to Turkey, 5 June 1980
USS Warrington	DD-843	Bath Iron Works, Bath, Maine	23 April 1945	27 September 1945	20 December 1945	IB	30 September 1972	Transferred to Taiwan, 24 April 1973, for spare parts
USS Perry	DD-844	Bath Iron Works, Bath, Maine	14 May 1945	25 October 1945	17 January 1946	IA	1 July 1973	Sold for scrap, 24 June 1974
USS Bausell	DD-845	Bath Iron Works, Bath, Maine	28 May 1945	19 November 1945	7 February 1946	IA	30 May 1978	Sunk as a target, 17 July 1987
USS Ozbourn	DD-846	Bath Iron Works, Bath, Maine	16 June 1945	22 December 1945	5 March 1946	IB	30 May 1975	Sold for scrap, 1 December 1975
USS Robert L. Wilson	DD-847	Bath Iron Works, Bath, Maine	2 July 1945	5 January 1946	28 March 1946	IB	30 September 1974	Sunk as a target, 1 March 1980
USS Witek	DD-848 EDD-848	Bath Iron Works, Bath, Maine	16 July 1945	2 February 1946	23 April 1946		19 August 1968	Sunk as a target, 4 July 1969
USS Richard E. Kraus	DD-849	Bath Iron Works, Bath, Maine	31 July 1945	2 March 1946	23 May 1946	IB	1 July 1976	Transferred to South Korea, 23 February 1977
USS Joseph P. Kennedy Jr.	DD-850	Bethlehem Shipbuilding Corporation, Fore River Shipyard, Quincy, Massachusetts	2 April 1945	26 July 1945	15 December 1945	IB	2 July 1973	Museum ship at Battleship Cove
USS Rupertus	DD-851	Bethlehem Shipbuilding Corporation, Fore River Shipyard, Quincy, Massachusetts	2 May 1945	21 September 1945	8 March 1946	IB	10 July 1973	Loaned to Greece, 10 July 1973
USS Leonard F. Mason	DD-852	Bethlehem Shipbuilding Corporation, Fore River Shipyard, Quincy, Massachusetts	6 August 1945	4 January 1946	28 June 1946	IB	2 November 1976	Sold to Republic of China, 10 March 1978
USS Charles H. Roan	DD-853	Bethlehem Shipbuilding Corporation, Fore River Shipyard, Quincy, Massachusetts	27 September 1945	15 March 1946	12 September 1946	IB	21 September 1973	Transferred to Turkey, 21 September 1973
USS Fred T. Berry	DD-858 DDE-858	Bethlehem Shipbuilding, San Pedro, California	16 July 1944	28 January 1945	12 May 1945	II	15 September 1970	Scuttled as an artificial reef, 14 May 1972
USS Norris	DD-859 DDE-859	Bethlehem Shipbuilding, San Pedro, California	29 August 1944	25 February 1945	9 June 1945	II	4 December 1970	Transferred to Turkey, 1 July 1974
USS McCaffery	DD-860 DDE-860	Bethlehem Shipbuilding, San Pedro, California	1 October 1944	12 April 1945	26 July 1945	II	30 September 1973	Sold for scrap, 11 June 1974
USS Harwood	DD-861 DDE-861	Bethlehem Shipbuilding, San Pedro, California	29 October 1944	22 May 1945	28 September 1945	II	1 February 1971	Transferred to Turkey, 17 December 1971
USS Vogelgesang	DD-862	Bethlehem Staten Island, Staten Island, New York	3 August 1944	15 January 1945	28 April 1945	IB	24 February 1982	Sold to Mexico, 24 February 1982
USS Steinaker	DD-863	Bethlehem Staten Island, Staten Island, New York	1 September 1944	13 February 1945	26 May 1945	IB	24 February 1982	Sold to Mexico, 24 February 1982
USS Harold J. Ellison	DD-864	Bethlehem Staten Island, Staten Island, New York	3 October 1944	14 March 1945	23 June 1945	IB	1 October 1983	Transferred to Pakistan, 1 October 1983
USS Charles R. Ware	DD-865	Bethlehem Staten Island, Staten Island, New York	1 November 1944	12 April 1945	21 July 1945	IB	30 November 1974	Sunk as target 15 November 1981
USS Cone	DD-866	Bethlehem Staten Island, Staten Island, New York	30 November 1944	10 May 1945	18 August 1945	IB	1 October 1982	Transferred to Pakistan, 1 October 1982
USS Stribling	DD-867	Bethlehem Staten Island, Staten Island, New York	15 January 1945	8 June 1945	29 September 1945	IA	1 July 1976	Sunk as target, 27 July 1980
USS Brownson	DD-868	Bethlehem Staten Island, Staten Island, New York	13 February 1945	7 July 1945	17 November 1945	IB	30 September 1976	Sold for scrap, 10 June 1977
USS Arnold J. Isbell	DD-869	Bethlehem Staten Island, Staten Island, New York	14 March 1945	6 August 1945	5 January 1946	IB	4 December 1973	Sold to Greece, 4 December 1973
USS Fechteler	DD-870	Bethlehem Staten Island, Staten Island, New York	12 April 1945	19 September 1945	2 March 1946	IB	11 September 1970	Sold for scrap, 28 June 1972
USS Damato	DD-871 DDE-871	Bethlehem Staten Island, Staten Island, New York	10 May 1945	21 November 1945	27 April 1946	IB	30 September 1980	Transferred to Pakistan, 1 October 1980
USS Forrest Royal	DD-872	Bethlehem Staten Island, Staten Island, New York	8 June 1945	17 January 1946	29 June 1946	IB	27 March 1971	Sold to Turkey, 27 March 1971
USS Hawkins	DD-873	Consolidated Steel Corporation, Orange, Texas	14 May 1944	7 October 1944	10 February 1945	IB	1 October 1979	Sold to Taiwan, 17 March 1983
USS Duncan	DD-874 DDR-874	Consolidated Steel Corporation, Orange, Texas	22 May 1944	27 October 1944	25 February 1945	II	15 January 1971	Sunk as target, 31 July 1980
USS Henry W. Tucker	DD-875	Consolidated Steel Corporation, Orange, Texas	29 May 1944	8 November 1944	12 March 1945	IB	3 December 1973	Transferred to Brazil, 3 December 1973
USS Rogers	DD-876	Consolidated Steel Corporation, Orange, Texas	3 June 1944	20 November 1944	26 March 1945	IB	1 October 1980	Transferred to South Korea, 25 July 1981
USS Perkins	DD-877 DDR-877	Consolidated Steel Corporation, Orange, Texas	19 June 1944	7 December 1944	4 April 1945	II	15 January 1973	Transferred to Argentina, 15 January 1973
USS Vesole	DD-878 DDR-878	Consolidated Steel Corporation, Orange, Texas	3 July 1944	29 December 1944	23 April 1945	IB	1 December 1976	Sunk as target, 14 April 1983
USS Leary	DD-879	Consolidated Steel Corporation, Orange, Texas	11 August 1944	20 January 1945	7 May 1945	IB	31 October 1973	Transferred to Spain, 17 May 1978
USS Dyess	DD-880	Consolidated Steel Corporation, Orange, Texas	17 August 1944	26 January 1945	21 May 1945	IB	27 January 1981	Sold to Greece for spare parts, 8 July 1981
USS Bordelon	DD-881	Consolidated Steel Corporation, Orange, Texas	9 September 1944	3 March 1945	5 June 1945	IB	1 February 1977	Transferred to Iran, 1 July 1977
USS Furse	DD-882	Consolidated Steel Corporation, Orange, Texas	23 September 1944	9 March 1945	10 July 1945	IB	31 August 1972	Loaned to Spain, 1972; Sold, 17 May 1978
USS Newman K. Perry	DD-883	Consolidated Steel Corporation, Orange, Texas	10 October 1944	17 March 1945	26 July 1945	IB	27 February 1981	Transferred to South Korea, 27 February 1981
USS Floyd B. Parks	DD-884	Consolidated Steel Corporation, Orange, Texas	30 October 1944	31 March 1945	31 July 1945	IB	2 July 1973	Sold for scrap, 1 April 1974
USS John R. Craig	DD-885	Consolidated Steel Corporation, Orange, Texas	17 November 1944	14 April 1945	20 August 1945	IB	27 July 1979	Sunk as target, 17 June 1980
USS Orleck	DD-886	Consolidated Steel Corporation, Orange, Texas	28 November 1944	12 May 1945	15 September 1945	IB	1 October 1982	Transferred to Turkey, 1 October 1982
USS Brinkley Bass	DD-887	Consolidated Steel Corporation, Orange, Texas	20 December 1944	26 May 1945	1 October 1945	IB	3 December 1973	Transferred to Brazil, 3 December 1973
USS Stickell	DD-888	Consolidated Steel Corporation, Orange, Texas	5 January 1945	16 June 1945	31 October 1945	IB	1 July 1972	Transferred to Greece, 1 July 1972
USS O'Hare	DD-889	Consolidated Steel Corporation, Orange, Texas	27 January 1945	22 June 1945	29 November 1945	IB	31 October 1973	Loaned to Spain, 31 October 1973; Sold, 17 May 1978
USS Meredith	DD-890	Consolidated Steel Corporation, Orange, Texas	27 January 1945	28 June 1945	31 December 1945	IA	29 June 1979	Transferred to Turkey, 29 June 1979

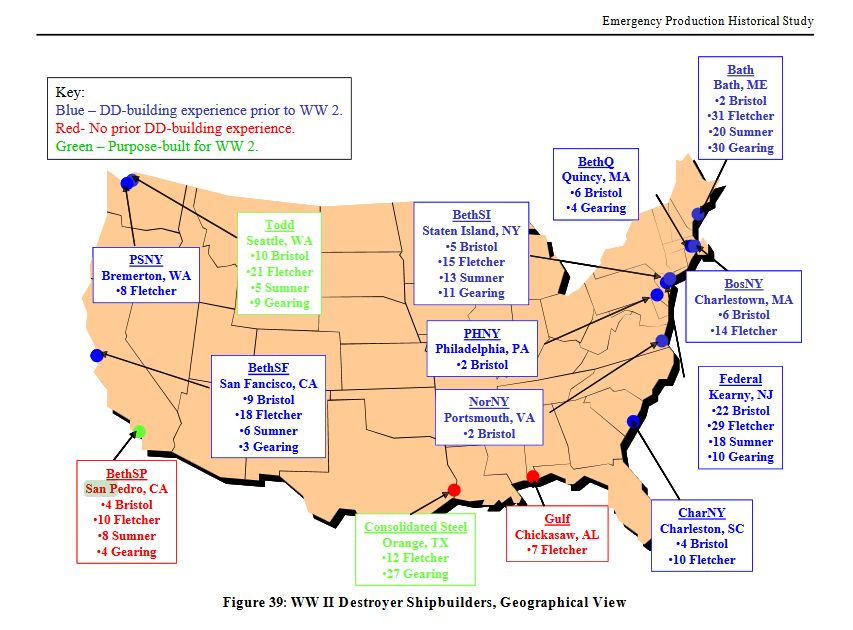
World War II Destroyer Shipbuilders map from Department of Defense (DoD)

== Survivors ==
Five Gearing-class destroyers are preserved as museum ships: two in the United States, one in South Korea, one in Taiwan, and one in Turkey. The ROKS Jeon Buk (DD-916) (formerly the USS Everett F. Larson) was scrapped in December 2021, leaving five survivors out of the ninety eight ships built.

=== Surviving ships ===
- USS Joseph P. Kennedy Jr. (DD-850) in Fall River, Massachusetts
- USS Orleck (DD-886) in Jacksonville, Florida
- ROCS Te Yang (DDG-925) in Tainan City, Taiwan
- ROKS Jeong Ju (DD-925) in Dangjin, South Korea
- TCG Gayret (D352) in Izmit, Turkey

=== Surviving parts ===
- USS Higbee (DD-806), in Naval Station Mayport Dental Clinic, Florida.
- ROCS Kai Yang (DDG-924), in August 23 Artillery Battle Museum, Taichung, Taiwan.
- ROCS Tze Yang (DDG-930), in Kaohsiung Harbor, Taiwan.
- Quetzalcoatl (E-03), in Mexican Pacific Fleet headquarters, Mexico.
