= USS Henry W. Tucker =

Gearing-class destroyer

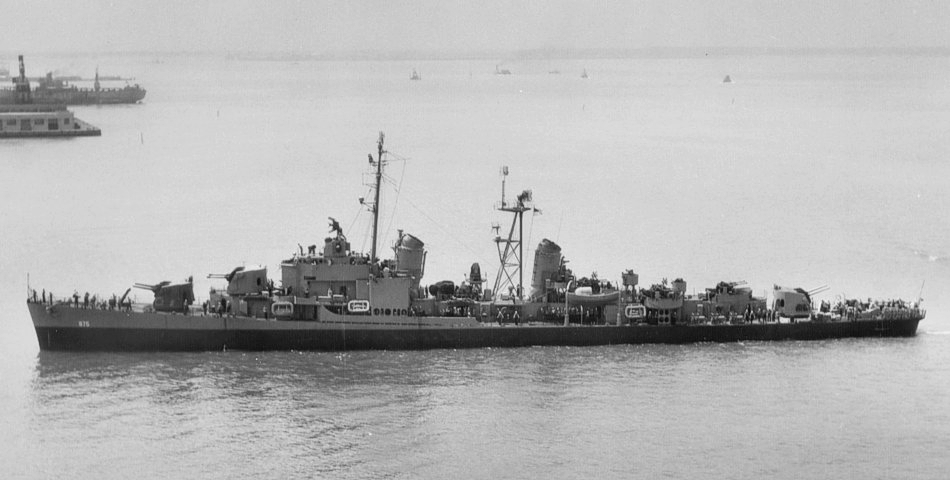
- USS Henry W. Tucker in 1945

History

United States
- Name: USS Henry W. Tucker
- Builder: Consolidated Steel Corp.
- Laid down: 29 May 1944
- Launched: 8 November 1944
- Commissioned: 12 March 1945
- Decommissioned: 3 December 1973
- Stricken: 3 December 1973
- Identification: Callsign: NBHK; Hull number: DD-875
- Honors and awards: WWII (1945) seven battle stars for Korean War service (1951-1953) Vietnam War (1963-73) Combat Action Ribbon
- Fate: transferred to Brazil, 3 December 1973

History

Brazil
- Name: Marcilio Dias
- Acquired: 3 December 1973
- Commissioned: 3 December 1973
- Decommissioned: 19 September 1994
- Identification: D-25
- Fate: Sunk as target, 26 March 1996

General characteristics
- Class & type: Gearing-class destroyer
- Displacement: 2,425 tons
- Length: 390.5 ft (119.0 m)
- Beam: 41.07 ft (12.52 m)
- Draft: 18.5 ft (5.6 m)
- Propulsion: High-pressure super-heated boilers, geared turbines with twin screws, 60,000 hp
- Speed: 34.5 knots (39.7 mph; 63.9 km/h)
- Complement: 367
- Armament: 6 x 5 in (127 mm)/38 cal. guns; 8 x 40 mm guns; 5 x 21 inch (533 mm) torpedo tubes

The second USS Henry W. Tucker (DD-875) was a Gearing-class destroyer of the United States Navy.

== Namesake ==
Henry Warren Tucker was born on 5 October 1919 in Birmingham, Alabama. He enlisted in the United States Naval Reserve on 24 June 1941 and, after being trained as a pharmacist's mate, reported to the oiler USS Neosho on 15 January 1942.

On 7 May 1942, in the opening phase of the Battle of the Coral Sea, Neosho and its escorting destroyer, USS Sims, were attacked by three waves of Imperial Japanese Navy planes after the Japanese mistook Neosho for an aircraft carrier and Sims for an escorting cruiser. Sims was sunk and Neosho so severely damaged that her commanding officer ordered all hands to prepare to abandon ship. Many of Neosho's crew, believing in error that "abandon ship" orders had actually been given, went over the side at once. As the men struggled through the water trying to reach the few undamaged life rafts, Tucker swam among them, treating the burned and wounded. Disregarding his own safety, he helped many of his shipmates to safety on the life rafts while refusing a place himself, at the cost of his life. He was posthumously awarded the Navy Cross.

The destroyer escort USS Henry W. Tucker (DE-377) was named for him but its construction was cancelled in 1944 prior to completion.

== Construction and career ==
Henry W. Tucker was laid down by the Consolidated Steel Corporation at Orange, Texas on 29 May 1944 and launched on 8 November 1944 by Mrs. Henry Walton Tucker, the mother of the late Pharmacist's Mate Third Class Henry W. Tucker. The ship was commissioned on 12 March 1945.

=== Service in the United States Navy ===
==== 1945-1963 ====
After shakedown, Henry W. Tucker was converted to a radar picket destroyer and participated in radar and antiaircraft exercises off the Maine coast until sailing for Pearl Harbor 4 November. From the Hawaiian Islands she continued to Yokosuka, arriving 22 December, to aid in the occupation of Japan and repatriation of Japanese nationals. Her first tour of duty in the Far East ended 25 March 1946 as she set course for her new homeport, San Diego. In the next 3 years Henry W. Tucker made two more such cruises, alternating them with tactical exercises and operations along the east coast. In March and April 1948 the destroyer patrolled off Eniwetok in connection with United States atomic tests in the Pacific islands. She was reclassified DDR-875 18 March 1949.

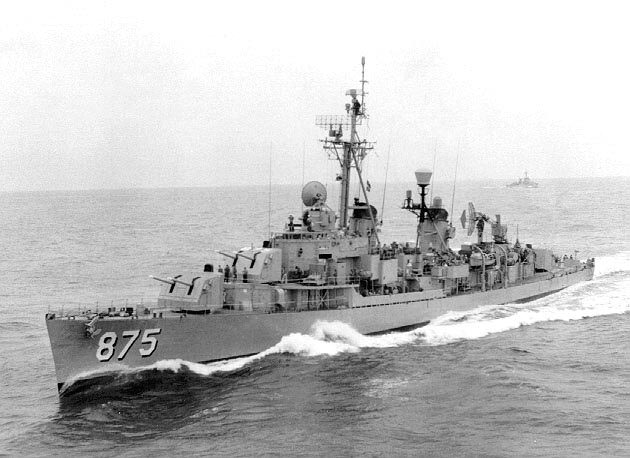
View of ship prior to 1963 FRAM upgrade and reclassification.

Undergoing overhaul at the time North Korean troops launched their attack on South Korea in June 1950, Henry W. Tucker speeded up preparations and joined the fleet operating off Korea in November. After five months of hunter-killer and patrol operations, she joined the screen for Task Force 77, a fast carrier force whose jets struck hard and often at enemy supply lines and troop concentrations. The destroyer also participated in shore bombardment and landed several raiding and intelligence parties on the western coast of the war-torn peninsula. On 28 June 1951 as she steamed into Wonsan harbour, Henry W. Tucker was hit by six enemy shells. Two men were injured and extensive damage was done to her radar gear, but the destroyer's return fire effectively silenced enemy shore batteries. Returning to San Diego 8 August, Henry W. Tucker engaged in intensive training exercises before returning to Korea to join Task Force 77 off the east coast 25 March 1952. Screening and plane guard duty with the fast carrier force alternated with ASW patrol and shore bombardment duties until she sailed for home 13 September.

Henry W. Tucker entered the Mare Island Naval Shipyard for installation of the newest radar equipment in September, emerging 14 April 1953. Her new duties, centered primarily on the detection of enemy attack through extensive radar coverage, were to take her on eight more Western Pacific cruises in the next 10 years. In addition to the lonely patrols along the radar picket line, Henry W. Tucker also patrolled the important Formosa Straits and the Korean coast. When not deployed with the 7th Fleet, the radar picket destroyer participated in tactical training exercises and fleet maneuvers out of her San Diego homeport. Streaming her homeward bound pennant at Yokosuka 2 November 1962, Henry W. Tucker sailed for Boston via Pearl Harbor, San Diego, Acapulco, and the Panama Canal.

==== 1963-1973 ====
She underwent an extensive Fleet Rehabilitation and Modernization (FRAM) overhaul at the Boston Naval Shipyard in Boston, Massachusetts, between 13 December 1962 and 4 December 1963, designed to lengthen her life as an active member of the fleet by 10 to 15 years. While undergoing modernization, she was reclassified DD-875 on 15 March 1963. Following the FRAM overhaul, Henry W. Tucker began a program of intensive training, until 26 May, when she departed for the western Pacific and a station on the Taiwan Patrol. Almost immediately she was diverted to the South China Sea.

Tucker alternated between antisubmarine patrol off Vietnam and off Taiwan until April 1965, when she joined Operation Market Time, a close surveillance of Vietnamese coastal traffic to prevent the shipment of supplies to the Viet Cong on the South Vietnamese coast. On 16 May the destroyer pounded Viet Cong coastal concentrations southeast of Saigon and thus became the first U.S. ship to provide naval gunfire support against enemy targets in South Vietnam. During the Vietnam War Henry W. Tucker served as plane guard for aircraft carriers on Yankee Station in the Tonkin Gulf, participated in Operation Sea Dragon and Operation Market Time, patrolled on search and rescue duties, and carried out naval gunfire support missions.

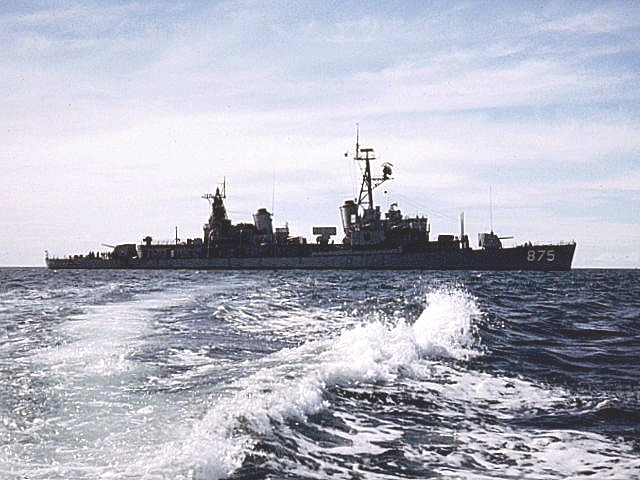
USS Henry W. Tucker at anchor at An Thoi, Vietnam.

Henry W. Tucker provided gunfire support for ground operations dozens of times; and during a 40-day period in August and September fired over 5,000 rounds from her 12.7 cm guns, destroying or damaging numerous enemy positions. In addition to Market Time patrols, she screened hardhitting attack carriers in the South China Sea and the Gulf of Tonkin and served as a search and rescue control ship to recover downed pilots at sea. This vital duty sent her close to enemy-controlled shores; however, joined by daring CSAR helicopters which refueled and replenished from the destroyer while in flight, she provided maximum protection for planes returning from strikes over North Vietnam. She refueled more than 80 helicopters while on SAR assignments. Known as "Tuck's Tavern" to the helicopter pilots, she became the first destroyer on 6 November to refuel an in-flight helicopter at night. Coordinated training with these versatile aircraft paid off 26 June 1966 when two pilots from USS Constellation and USS Ranger were rescued from the sea less than 5 kilometres (3.1 mi) from the North Vietnamese coast and carried to Henry W. Tucker.

After more than 2 years of almost continuous duty off Vietnam, Henry W. Tucker returned to Long Beach early in August 1966. Following a 4-month overhaul and intensive training out of San Diego and Long Beach, she deployed to the Far East in June 1967. She resumed carrier screening duty late in July; and, following the disastrous fire on board USS Forrestal on 29 July, she took part in survivor rescue and escort operations.

From 1968 to July 1970, Henry W. Tucker was forward deployed to Yokosuka Naval Base as part of Destroyer Squadron 3, U.S. Seventh Fleet. During this period, the ship conducted numerous missions in support of U.S. and allied forces in Vietnam including II Corps naval gunfire support, Gulf of Tonkin carrier operations and search and rescue operations. In April, 1969, Tucker was attached to Task Force 71, the U.S. government's response to the shooting down of a US Navy EC-121M by North Korean fighter planes. During the 1970 Cambodian Incursion by U.S. and ARVN forces, Henry W. Tucker took up station in the Gulf of Thailand to blockade the Cambodian port of Sihanoukville to prevent supplies arriving by sea to aid the NVA forces. While in port at Yokosuka on 14 April 1970, the crew was ordered to return to the ship and prepare to sail as part of the Apollo 13 emergency recovery team. The order was canceled when the distance to the recovery area was deemed too far with return anticipated three days later.

Henry W. Tucker was stationed at San Diego for the next 3 years but returned to WESTPAC on two more cruises prior to decommissioning. On Christmas Eve 1972, Henry W. Tucker and Henderson came under fire from a North Vietnamese shore battery. The ships returned fire and the battery was silenced. Both ships received the Combat Action Ribbon for the mission.

=== Service in the Brazilian Navy ===
==== 1973-1982 ====
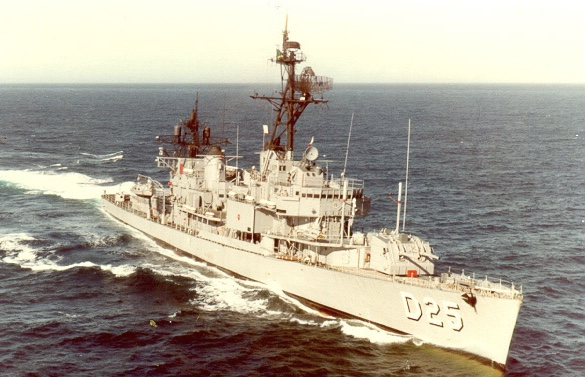
Marcilio Dias (D-25)

Henry W. Tucker was decommissioned and stricken from the Naval Vessel Register on 3 December 1973, transferred to Brazil, renamed Marcilio Dias, and placed in service with the Brazilian Navy. On 28 June 1974, she arrived in Brazil, docking in Rio de Janeiro, where she joined the 1st Destroyer Squadron. On 18 April 1975, with the ship anchored in Guanabara Bay, a Wasp helicopter landed on board a destroyer for the first time.

In January 1977, she participated in Operation READEX-I/77. From September until October 1978, she participated in the 2nd Phase of Operation UNITAS XXI, carried out in the area between Rio de Janeiro and Recife (PE), as part of the Brazilian Task Group. In 1981, she was suspended from Rio de Janeiro to Santos (SP) for training exercises, forming a GT, composed of the aircraft carrier Minas Gerais, Marcílio Dias, Piauí, Maranhão, Alagoas and Rio Grande do Norte and Goiás and Riachuelo. In November, during a commission off Cabo Frio (RJ), the 200th landing on board was carried out.

==== 1982-1992 ====
On May 11, 1982, she left Rio de Janeiro as part of a task force, formed by Marcílio Dias and Mato Grosso, Soares Dutra, Garcia D'Ávila, and Tambaú and Camboriú to participate in the ANFIBIEX-I exercise on the coast of the Espírito Santo. In September, she participated in Operation DRAGÃO XVIII. In October 1983, she participated in Operation FRATERNO V, carried out together with ships of the Argentine Navy on the Santos/Rio de Janeiro stretch. In January 1984, the ship participated in Operation ASPIRANTEX 84/TROPICALEX I/84, carried out in the waters of the Northeast, as part of the FT-10, which was composed of the aircraft carrier Minas Gerais.

In January 1985, the ship was part of the WG that carried out Operation TROPICALEX I/85, in the area between the coasts of São Paulo and Pernambuco. Later that year in March, she held a dressage commission together with Mariz e Barros, Mato Grosso and Santa Catarina, and Ceará. The Port of Santos (SP) was visited. In April and May, it participated in Operation TEMPEREX I/85. In October 1985, she participated in Operation UNITAS XXVI, carried out between Santos and Salvador. In 1986, the ship won the Efficiency Trophy – Echo “E”, for the year 1985. In July, she participated in the TROPICALEX II/86 Operation as part of a task force that included, among others, Minas Gerais and Independência. In October 1986, she participated in the UNITAS 1986 operation, when he was even honored for his excellent performance in anti-submarine exercises with a plaque offered by the commander of the USS Shark to the then commander of Marcilio Dias. In January 1988, the ship participated in Operation ASPIRANTEX 88/TROPICALEX I/88, carried out in the area between Rio de Janeiro and Alagoas. In 1989, the ship participated in Operations TROPICALEX-I/89, INCURSEX-I, ADEREX-I/89, ADEREX-II/89, TEMPEREX-II/89, VENBRAS 89, SIGNAL RED, CATRAPO-III, HELITRAPO-II.

==== 1992-1994 ====
Between 3 and 6 April 1992, she was in Santos along with Amazonas. Participated in Operation TEMPEREX-I/92, as part of Task Force 48. On December 3, 1993, he completed 20 years of service in the Brazilian Navy, having participated in this period of several Commissions, such as: DRAGÃO, UNITAS, READEX, ANFIBIEX, SINAL VERMELHO, CATRAPO, COSTEIREX, INSUP, OCEANEX, TEMPEREX, TROPICALEX, FRA TERNO, GDBEX, VENBRAS, SA TCON, CONFRONTEX, ADEREX, FORTEX, INCURSEX and PRESIDENTEX, among others. On July 24, 1986, during the “TROPICALEX” operation, it was the first ship of the Brazilian Navy to receive fuel oil transferred from Minas Gerais, with both ships moving.

After her service with the Brazilian Navy, Marcilio Dias (D-25) was decommissioned on 31 August 1994 and was sunk by the submarine Tamoio, in a Mk 24 Tigerfish torpedo firing exercise, on March 26, 1996. The explosion split the ship in half and twenty minutes after impact, the target lay at a depth of 650 metres (2,130 ft).
