= USS Perry (DD-844) =

Gearing-class destroyer

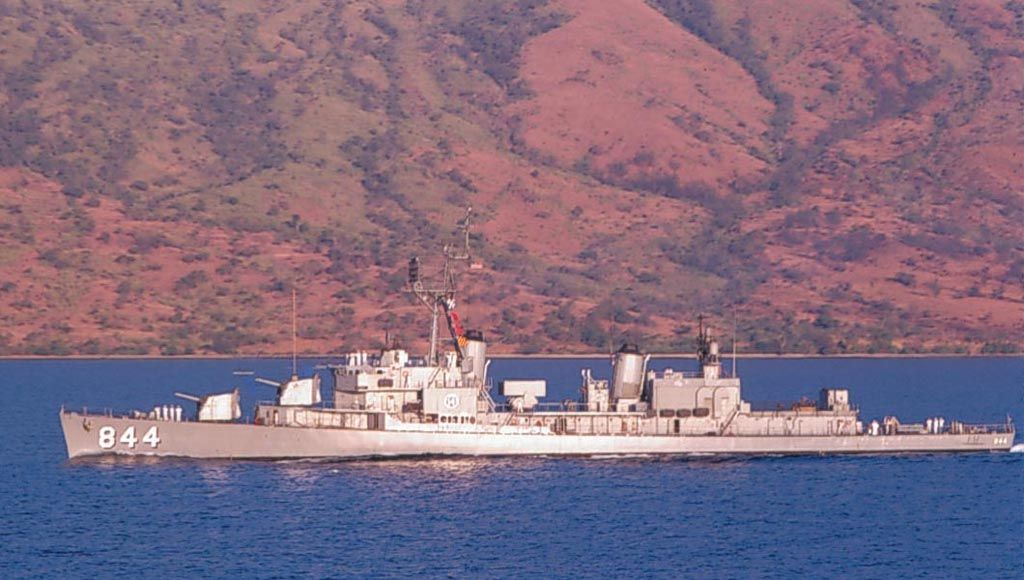
- Perry in 1969

History

United States
- Name: USS Perry
- Namesake: Oliver Hazard Perry
- Builder: Bath Iron Works, Bath, Maine
- Laid down: 14 May 1945
- Launched: 25 October 1945
- Commissioned: 17 January 1946
- Decommissioned: 1 July 1973
- Stricken: 1 July 1973
- Identification: Callsign: NBBY; Hull number: DD-844
- Fate: Sold for scrap, 24 June 1974

General characteristics
- Class & type: Gearing-class destroyer
- Displacement: 3,460 long tons (3,516 t) full
- Length: 390 ft 6 in (119.02 m)
- Beam: 40 ft 10 in (12.45 m)
- Draft: 14 ft 4 in (4.37 m)
- Propulsion: Geared turbines, 2 shafts, 60,000 shp (45 MW)
- Speed: 35 knots (65 km/h; 40 mph)
- Range: 4,500 nmi (8,300 km) at 20 kn (37 km/h; 23 mph)
- Complement: 336
- Armament: 6 × 5"/38 caliber guns; 12 × 40 mm AA guns; 11 × 20 mm AA guns; 10 × 21 inch (533 mm) torpedo tubes; 6 × depth charge projectors; 2 × depth charge tracks

USS Perry (DD-844) was a Gearing-class destroyer of the United States Navy, the fourth Navy ship of that name and the fifth named for Commodore Oliver Hazard Perry (1785–1819), victor of the Battle of Lake Erie during the War of 1812 and one of the early heroes of the U.S. Navy.

Perry was laid down on 14 May 1945 by the Bath Iron Works Corp., Bath, Maine; launched on 25 October 1945; sponsored by Mrs. George Tilton; and commissioned on 17 January 1946.

== Service history ==
=== 1946–1959 ===
Following shakedown off Cuba and plane guard exercises off Pensacola, Florida, Perry departed the east coast, on 12 June 1946, for her first overseas deployment, a nine-month cruise which took her first to northern Europe, thence to the Mediterranean. There she joined other American units in patrolling off tension-ridden areas bordering on that sea, particularly on the Adriatic, the Aegean, and the Dardanelles—Sea of Marmara—Bosporus. Returning to her homeport, Newport, Rhode Island, on 8 March 1947, she conducted local operations and exercises from Puerto Rico to Canada and, in addition, served as Engineering School Ship for Destroyer Forces, Atlantic Fleet, and, in October, assisted in fighting the fire which ravaged the Maine resort of Mount Desert Island.

Perry remained in the western Atlantic until January 1951, when she got underway again for the Mediterranean. 6th Fleet operations were followed by exercises with the British Home Fleet and in May she returned to New England and plane guard duties, local operations and training exercises.

In 1952, following her 3rd Mediterranean tour, she again served as Engineering School Ship and participated in type, fleet, and NATO exercises until resuming overseas employment in 1954. In the Mediterranean from January to June, she served as Gunnery School Ship on her return.

During the next four years Perry regularly deployed to the Mediterranean, patrolling, in early 1956, off the Suez Canal as the United States attempted to promote a peaceful settlement to the mounting crisis between Israel and the Arab League nations.

=== 1960–1973 ===
Between 29 April 1959 and 10 May 1960 Perry underwent Fleet Rehabilitation and Modernization (FRAM) Conversion, the first such conversion, at the Boston Naval Shipyard. In addition to improved living spaces, she received the latest in sonar and anti-submarine weaponry, including ASROC and DASH. Exercises in the Caribbean followed and, in August, she shifted her homeport to Mayport, Florida, whence she began operations with Task Group Alpha. Over the next two years, she operated with that group, participated in Polaris missile tests in the Atlantic Missile Range, and conducted local operations and training cruises. On 2 August 1962, she departed Florida to resume overseas deployments and for the next seven years rotated between 6th Fleet and Middle East Force tours and operations in the western Atlantic, the latter including further Polaris tests, school ship duties for the Sonar School at Key West, and, in May 1965, patrol duties with Task Force 124 (TF 124) off the Dominican Republic.

In 1969, Perry interrupted her previous schedule and on 11 January got underway for duty in the western Pacific. Arriving at Subic Bay, Philippines, on 29 February, she joined the 7th Fleet for operations off Vietnam. On her return to her homeport of Mayport, Florida, she ran into Hurricane Camille on 16 August. She was ordered to remain on course and report weather conditions, among which were wind speeds of 190 knots. Her department heads eventually convinced the commanding officer to change course, but since it was his first command, he was initially reluctant to do so. He finally requested a course change, but by then Perry had suffered significant structural damage, and on 3 September returned to her homeport for three months of repairs. Perry then resumed her duties with the Atlantic Fleet, continuing them into 1970.

Perry was decommissioned and struck from the Naval Vessel Register on 1 July 1973. She was sold on 24 June 1974 and broken up for scrap.
