= List of ship classes of World War II =

The List of ship classes of World War II is an alphabetical list of all ship classes that served in World War II. Only actual classes are included as opposed to unique ships (which are still included if they were the only one of a class to be built, for example, HMS Hood was the first of the four planned Admiral-class battlecruisers, but the other three were cancelled).

The list of ships of World War II contains major military vessels of the war, arranged alphabetically and by type. The list includes armed vessels that served during the war and in the immediate aftermath, inclusive of localized ongoing combat operations, garrison surrenders, post-surrender occupation, colony re-occupation, troop and prisoner repatriation, to the end of 1945. For smaller vessels, see also List of World War II ships of less than 1000 tons. Some uncompleted Axis ships are included, out of historic interest. Ships are designated to the country under which they operated for the longest period of the World War II, regardless of where they were built or previous service history.

== Ship classes of World War II ==
List of ship classes of World War II
Class	Type	Country	Launch Year(s)	Displacement (tons)	Number built (wartime/total)
250t	Torpedo boat/gunboat	Romanian Naval Forces	1914	266	3
A	Destroyer	Royal Navy	1929–1930	1,350	11
A	Submarine	Royal Norwegian Navy	1914	268	3
Abdiel (a.k.a. Manxman)	Minelayer	Royal Navy	1940–1944	2,650	6
Acciaio	Submarine	Regia Marina	1941	697	13
Acre	Destroyer	Brazilian Navy	1943–1946	1,340	6
Admiral Hipper	Heavy cruiser	Kriegsmarine	1937–1939	14,000	3
Admiralty (a.k.a. Scott)	Destroyer flotilla leader	Royal Navy	1918–1919	1,610–1,810	6 / 8
Adua	Submarine	Regia Marina	1936	697	17
Ægir	Submarine	Royal Danish Navy	1915	237	5
Aetos	Destroyer	Hellenic Navy	1911	1,050	4
Agano	Light cruiser	Imperial Japanese Navy	1941–1944	6,650	4
Ahven	Minesweeper	Finnish Navy	1937	17	6
Aigle	Destroyer	French Navy	1930–1931	2,441	6
Akagi Maru	Armed merchant cruiser	Imperial Japanese Navy	1941	7,389	3
Akatsuki	Destroyer	Imperial Japanese Navy	1931–1932	1,680	4
Akizuki	Destroyer	Imperial Japanese Navy	1941–1944	2,700	12
Alaska	Large cruiser	United States Navy	1943–1950	34,253	2
Algerien	Destroyer	French Navy	1943–1944	1,300	6
Algerine	Minesweeper	Royal Navy	1942–1944	864–1,047	109
Allen M. Sumner	Destroyer	United States Navy	1943–1944	2,200	58
Amiral Murgescu	Minelayer	Romanian Naval Forces	1939–1944	1,068	2
Amphion (a.k.a. A or Acheron)	Submarine	Royal Navy	1944–1945	1,620	2 / 18
Andrea Doria	Battleship	Regia Marina	1913	29,345 (WW2 after modification)	2
Andromeda	Attack cargo ship	United States Navy	1943–1945	6,761	30
Aoba	Heavy cruiser	Imperial Japanese Navy	1926	7100	2
Aquila (a.k.a. Vifor)	Scout cruiser	Romanian Naval Forces	1917–1918	1,594	2
Archimede	Submarine	Regia Marina	1936	985	2
Arethusa	Light cruiser	Royal Navy	1934–1936	5,250	4
Argo	Submarine	Regia Marina	1936	810	2
Argonauta	Submarine	Regia Marina	1932	667	10
Asama	Cruiser	Imperial Japanese Navy	1898	9,700	2
Asashio	Destroyer	Imperial Japanese Navy	1936–1937	1,961	10
Atlanta	Light cruiser	United States Navy	1941–1946	6,000	8
Avenger	Escort carrier	Royal Navy	1940–1941	8,300	3
Ayanami	Destroyer	Imperial Japanese Navy	1928–1921	1,750	10
B	Destroyer	Brazilian Navy	1930	1,360	9
B	Destroyer	Royal Navy	1943	1,253	9
B	Submarine	Royal Norwegian Navy	1923–1929	365	6
Bagley	Destroyer	United States Navy	1936–1937	1,646	8
Bahia	Scout cruiser	Brazilian Navy	1910	3,100	2
Balao	Submarine	United States Navy	1943–1946	2,429	120
Balilla	Submarine	Regia Marina	1928	1,484	4
Baltimore	Heavy cruiser	United States Navy	1942–1951	14,472	14
Bandiera	Submarine	Regia Marina	1930	937	4
Bangkok Maru	Armed merchant cruiser	Imperial Japanese Navy	1937	5,351	2
Bangor	Minesweeper	Royal Navy	1940–1944	600	128
Barnegat	Seaplane tender	United States Navy	1941–1943	2,600	35
Bathurst	Corvette	Royal Australian Navy	1940–1942	1,025	60
Battle	Destroyer	Royal Navy	1943–1945	2,315–2,574	26
Benham	Destroyer	United States Navy	1938–1939	1,637	10
Benson	Destroyer	United States Navy	1939–1941	1,620	30
Beograd	Destroyer	Royal Yugoslav Navy	1939	1,210	3
Bird	Minesweeper	Royal Navy	1938–1940	607	45
Bismarck	Battleship	Kriegsmarine	1940	50,300	2
Black Swan	Sloop	Royal Navy	1939–1945	1,250	37
Bogue	Escort carrier	United States Navy	1941–1944	16,890	11 (+34 to UK as Attacker and Ruler)
Bogue (a.k.a. Attacker)	Escort carrier	Royal Navy	1941–1943	16,890	9
Bogue (a.k.a. Ruler)	Escort carrier	Royal Navy	1942–1944	16,890	25
Bourrasque	Destroyer	French Navy	1924–1925	1,298	12
Bragadin	Submarine	Regia Marina	1931	982	2
Bretagne	Battleship	French Navy	1913	22,200	3
Brin	Submarine	Regia Marina	1938–1939	1,016	5
Bristol	Destroyer	United States Navy	1941–1943	1,839	64
Brooklyn	Light cruiser	United States Navy	1936–1938	9,767	9
Buckley	Destroyer escort	United States Navy	1943–1944	1,740	102 (+46 to UK as Captain)
Buckley (Charles Lawrence)	High speed transport	United States Navy	1943–1944	1,740	6 (+37 converted from commissioned Buckleys)
C	Submarine	Royal Danish Navy		369	3
C	Destroyer	Royal Navy	1931–1932	1,397	5
C (1943)	Destroyer	Royal Navy	1943–1946	1,740	32
C (Caledon)	Light cruiser	Royal Navy	1916–1917	4,180	3 / 4
C (Carlisle)	Light cruiser	Royal Navy	1916–1918	4,200	5
C (Caroline)	Light cruiser	Royal Navy	1914–1915	4,180	1 / 6
C (Ceres)	Light cruiser	Royal Navy	1917–1918	4,290	5
Cachalot	Submarine	United States Navy	1933	1,100	2
Calvi	Submarine	Regia Marina	1935	1,550	3
Cannon	Destroyer escort	United States Navy	1943–1944	1,525	72
Capitani Romani	Light cruiser	Regia Marina	1940–1942	3,686	3
Captain	Frigate	Royal Navy	1942–1943	1,500	78
Casablanca	Escort carrier	United States Navy	1943–1945	7,800	50
Castle	Corvette	Royal Navy	1943–1944	1,060	44
Chacal (a.k.a. Jaguar)	Destroyer	French Navy	1924	2,126	6
Chang Ning	Patrol boat	Republic of China Navy		400	10
Charger	Escort carrier	United States Navy	1940–1941	8,000	1 (+3 to UK as Avenger)
Chiwawa	Fleet oiler	United States Navy	1942	21,077	5
Chitose	Light aircraft carrier	Imperial Japanese Navy	1936-1937	11,190	2
Chidori	Torpedo boat	Imperial Japanese Navy	1933	535	4
Cimarron	Fleet oiler	United States Navy	1939–1945	24,830	35
Clemson	Destroyer	United States Navy	1918–1921	1,190	156
Cleveland	Light cruiser	United States Navy	1941–1946	11,744	27
Colony	Frigate	Royal Navy	1943–1945	1,400	21
Colorado	Battleship	United States Navy	1920–1921	32,600	3
Colossus	Light aircraft carrier	Royal Navy	1943–1944	13,200	10
Commencement Bay	Escort carrier	United States Navy	1944–1945	10,900	11 / 19
Condottieri (Alberto di Giussano)	Light cruiser	Regia Marina	1930	6,470	4
Condottieri (Cadorna)	Light cruiser	Regia Marina	1931–1932	5,239	2
Condottieri (Montecuccoli)	Light cruiser	Regia Marina	1934	7,404	2
Condottieri (Duca d'Aosta)	Light cruiser	Regia Marina	1934–1935	8,400	2
Condottieri (Duca degli Abruzzi)	Light cruiser	Regia Marina	1936	11,350	2
Conte di Cavour	Battleship	Regia Marina	1911	23,600	2
County (Kent)	Heavy cruiser	Royal Navy	1926–1927	9,850–10,900	7
County (London)	Heavy cruiser	Royal Navy	1927–1928	9,850	4
County (Norfolk)	Heavy cruiser	Royal Navy	1928–1929	9,925–9,975	2
Courbet	Battleship	French Navy	1911–1912	23,200	2
Crown Colony (Ceylon)	Light cruiser	Royal Navy	1941–1942	8,712	3
Crown Colony (Fiji)	Light cruiser	Royal Navy	1939–1941	8,530	8
Currituck	Seaplane tender	United States Navy	1943–1944	14,000	4
Curtatone	Torpedo boat	Regia Marina	1923–1924	967	4
Curtiss	Seaplane tender	United States Navy	1940	13,000	2
D	Submarine	Royal Danish Navy		369	2
D	Destroyer	Royal Navy	1931–1932	1,397	9
Danae	Light cruiser	Royal Navy	1917–1919	4,850	8
Dardo	Destroyer	Regia Marina	1930	2,116	19
Deutschland	Pre-dreadnought	Kriegsmarine	1906	12,100	2
Deutschland	Heavy cruiser	Kriegsmarine	1931–1934	12,100	3
Dido	Light cruiser	Royal Navy	1939–1941	5,600	11
Dido (Bellona)	Light cruiser	Royal Navy	1942	5,950	5
Dixie	Destroyer tender	United States Navy	1939–1943	9,450	5
Dragen	Destroyer	Royal Danish Navy	1929–1934	290	9
Draug	Destroyer	Royal Norwegian Navy	1910–1913 (approx)	578	3
Drazki	Torpedo boat	Bulgarian Navy	1907–1908	97	6
Duguay-Trouin	Light cruiser	French Navy	1923–1924	7,250	3
Dunkerque	Battleship	French Navy	1935–1936	35,500	2
Duquesne	Heavy cruiser	French Navy	1925–1926	12,435	2
E	Destroyer	Royal Navy	1934	1,428	18
Edsall	Destroyer escort	United States Navy	1943–1944	1,253	85
Eidsvold	Coastal battleship	Royal Norwegian Navy	1899	4,233	2
Elbing	Torpedo boat	Kriegsmarine	1941–1944	1,295	15
Emerald	Light cruiser	Royal Navy	1919–1920	7,580	2
Erebus	Monitor	Royal Navy	1916	7,200	2
Essex	Aircraft carrier	United States Navy	1942–1945	31,300	24
Evarts	Destroyer escort	United States Navy	1942–1944	1,360	65 (+32 to UK as Captain)
F	Destroyer	Royal Navy	1934	1,428	18
Fargo	Light cruiser	United States Navy	1945–1946	11,744	2
Farragut	Destroyer	United States Navy	1934–1935	1,395	8
Fletcher	Destroyer	United States Navy	1941–1944	2,325	175
Florida	Battleship	United States Navy	1910–1911	21,825	2
Flower	Corvette	Royal Navy; Royal Canadian Navy	1939–1944	940	225
Flower (Modified)	Corvette	Royal Navy; Royal Canadian Navy	1939–1944	1,015	69
Foca	Submarine	Regia Marina	1937	1,333	3
Folgore	Destroyer	Regia Marina	1931	1,830	4
Fubuki	Destroyer	Imperial Japanese Navy	1927–1929	1,750	10
Furutaka	Heavy cruiser	Imperial Japanese Navy	1925	7,100	2
Fusō	Battleship	Imperial Japanese Navy	1914–1915	35,300	2
G	Destroyer	Royal Navy	1935	1,340–1,350	9
Gabbiano	Corvette	Regia Marina	1942	672	40
Gangut	Battleship	Soviet Navy	1911	25,850	4
Gato	Submarine	United States Navy	1941–1943	1,825	77
Gearing	Destroyer	United States Navy	1945–1951	2,616	98
Generali	Torpedo boat	Regia Marina	1921	832	6
Gerard Callenburgh	Destroyer	Royal Netherlands Navy	1939–1940	1,604	4
Glauco	Submarine	Regia Marina	1935	1,035	2
Gleaves	Destroyer	United States Navy	1939–1941	1,630	66
Glorious	Aircraft carrier	Royal Navy	1916	26,500	2
Gridley	Destroyer	United States Navy	1936–1938	1,590	4
Grom	Destroyer	Polish Navy	1936	2,144	2
Guépard	Destroyer	French Navy	1928–1930	2,436	6
H	Destroyer	Royal Navy	1936–1939	1,340–1,350	15
Halcyon	Minesweeper	Royal Navy	1938–1939	1,330	21
Hamul	Destroyer tender	United States Navy	1940	8,560–18,900	2
Hatsuharu	Destroyer	Imperial Japanese Navy	1932–1934	1,490	6
Havmanden	Submarine	Royal Danish Navy	1938–1940	407	4
Hawkins	Heavy cruiser	Royal Navy	1917–1921	9,860	5
Hiyō	Aircraft carrier	Imperial Japanese Navy	1941	24,140	2
Hunt	Destroyer escort	Royal Navy	1939–1943	1,000–1,170	86
Hōkoku Maru	Ocean liner	Imperial Japanese Navy	1940–1942	17,000	3
I	Destroyer	Royal Navy	1936–1941	1,390	11
Illustrious	Aircraft carrier	Royal Navy	1939–1940	23,000	6
Implacable	Aircraft carrier	Royal Navy	1939	23,000	2
Independence	Light aircraft carrier	United States Navy	1942–1943	11,000	9
Iowa	Battleship	United States Navy	1942–1950	60,000	4
Ise	Battleship	Imperial Japanese Navy	1916–1917	31,762	2
Isles	Naval trawler	Royal Navy	1940–1944	554	145
Isles (Dance)	Naval trawler	Royal Navy	1940	554	20
Isles (Shakespearian)	Naval trawler	Royal Navy	1940	554	12
Isles (Tree)	Naval trawler	Royal Navy	1939–1940	545	20
Izumo	Armoured cruiser	Imperial Japanese Navy	1898	9,750	2
J	Destroyer	Royal Navy	1938–1939	1,690	9
Java	Light cruiser	Royal Netherlands Navy	1920–1921	6,670	2
John C. Butler	Destroyer escort	United States Navy	1943–1946	1,350	83
Junsen I Type	cruiser submarine	Imperial Japanese Navy	1923-1926	1,970	4
Junsen III Type	cruiser submarine	Imperial Japanese Navy	1934-1936	2,231	2
Junsen Type A	cruiser submarine	Imperial Japanese Navy	1938-1942	2,434	3
Junsen Type A Modified 2	cruiser submarine	Imperial Japanese Navy	1943-1945	2,620	2
Junsen Type B	cruiser submarine	Imperial Japanese Navy	1938-1943	2,198	19
Junsen Type B Modified 1	cruiser submarine	Imperial Japanese Navy	1943-1943	2,230	6
Junsen Type B Modified 2	cruiser submarine	Imperial Japanese Navy	1942-1944	2,140	3
Junsen Type C	cruiser submarine	Imperial Japanese Navy	1937-1944	2,184	8
Junsen Type C Modified	cruiser submarine	Imperial Japanese Navy	1942-1944	2,095	3
K	Destroyer	Royal Navy	1938–1939	1,690	8
Kagerō	Destroyer	Imperial Japanese Navy	1938–1941	2,033	19
Kaidai III Type	submarine	Imperial Japanese Navy	1924-1930	1,635	9
Kaidai IV Type	submarine	Imperial Japanese Navy	1926-1930	1,575	3
Kaidai V Type	submarine	Imperial Japanese Navy	1929-1932	1,575	3
Kaidai VI Type	submarine	Imperial Japanese Navy	1931-1938	1,400-1,425	8
Kaidai VII Type	submarine	Imperial Japanese Navy	1939–1943	1,630	10
Kaichū IV type	submarine	Imperial Japanese Navy	1921-1922	750	3
Kaichū V type	submarine	Imperial Japanese Navy	1921-1923	852	5
Kaichū VI type	submarine	Imperial Japanese Navy	1934-1937	700	2
Kaichū VII type	submarine	Imperial Japanese Navy	1941-1944	960	18
Kamikawa Maru	Seaplane tender	Imperial Japanese Navy	1936–1940	6,863	4
Kamikaze	Destroyer	Imperial Japanese Navy	1922–1925	1,400	9
Kashii Maru	Seaplane tender	Imperial Japanese Navy	1934–1941	8,600	3
Katori	Light cruiser	Imperial Japanese Navy	1939–1940	6,280	3
Kennebec	Fleet oiler	United States Navy	1941–1942	21,077–21,750	11
Kenneth Whiting	Seaplane tender	United States Navy	1943–1944	12,600	4
King George V	Battleship	Royal Navy	1939–1940	42,923	5
Kirov	Heavy cruiser	Soviet Navy	1938–1940	7,890	2
Kirov (Project 26-bis)	Heavy cruiser	Soviet Navy	1938–1944	8,177	2
Kirov (Project 26-bis2)	Heavy cruiser	Soviet Navy	1938–1944	8,400	2
Kiraisen Type	submarine	Imperial Japanese Navy	1924–1928	1,142	4
Kountouriotis	Destroyer	Hellenic Navy	1931–1932	1,389	4
Kongō	Battleship	Imperial Japanese Navy	1912–1913	31,720	4
Kongō Maru	Armed merchant cruiser	Imperial Japanese Navy	1934	8,613	2
Königsberg	Light cruiser	Kriegsmarine	1927–1928	6,650	3
Kuha	Minesweeper	Finnish Navy	1941–1946	18	6
Kuma	Light cruiser	Imperial Japanese Navy	1919–1920	5,019	5
Kyzikos	Torpedo boat	Hellenic Navy	1914–1915	270	3
L	Destroyer	Royal Navy	1939–1941	1,920	8
L	Submarine	Royal Navy	1916–1919	1,091–1,168	27
L'Adroit	Destroyer	French Navy	1926–1929	1,356	14
La Galissonnière	Light cruiser	French Navy	1933–1936	7,600	6
La Masa	Torpedo boat	Regia Marina	1917	840	8
Le Fantasque	Destroyer (or light cruiser)	French Navy	1933–1934	2,570	6
Le Hardi	Destroyer	French Navy	1938–1947	1,772	11
Leander	Light cruiser	Royal Navy	1931–1934	7,270	5
Leander (Amphion)	Light cruiser	Royal Navy	1931–1934	6,830	3
Leipzig	Light cruiser	Kriegsmarine	1929–1934	6,515–6,980	2
Leone	Destroyer	Regia Marina	1924	2,003	3
Lexington	Aircraft carrier	United States Navy	1925	37,000	2
Littorio	Battleship	Regia Marina	1937–1940	45,236	3
Liuzzi	Submarine	Regia Marina	1939–1940	1,166	2
Long Island	Escort carrier	United States Navy	1939	13,500	1 (+1 to UK as HMS Archer)
M	Destroyer	Royal Navy	1941–1942	1,920	8
M Type A Special Purpose Ship	Landing craft carrier	Imperial Japanese Army	1943–1945	11,910	3
MAC	Merchant aircraft carrier	Royal Navy (para-military)	1942–1945	7,950–9,133	10
MAC (Rapana)	Merchant aircraft carrier	Royal Navy (para-military)	1942–1945	8,010	9
Mackerel	Submarine	United States Navy	1940–1941	825	2
Maestrale	Destroyer	Regia Marina	1934	2,025	4
Mahan	Destroyer	United States Navy	1935–1936	1,488	18
Mameli	Submarine	Regia Marina	1929	880	4
Marcello	Submarine	Regia Marina	1939	1,060	11
Marcilio Dias (also M)	Destroyer	Brazilian Navy	1940–1941	1,500	3
Marconi	Submarine	Regia Marina	1940	1,195	6
Matsu	Destroyer escort	Imperial Japanese Navy	1944	1,262	18
Micca	Submarine	Regia Marina	1935	1,570	1
Minekaze	Destroyer	Imperial Japanese Navy	1919–1922	1,345	13
Minotaur	Light cruiser	Royal Navy	1943–1945	8,800	6
Mirabello	Destroyer	Regia Marina	1915–1916	1,811	2
Mississippi	Battleship	Hellenic Navy	1905	13,000	2
Mogador	Destroyer (or light cruiser)	French Navy	1936–1937	2,884	2
Mogami	Heavy cruiser	Imperial Japanese Navy	1934–1936	8,500	4
Momi	Destroyer	Imperial Japanese Navy	1918–1923	770	21
Momo	Destroyer	Imperial Japanese Navy	1917–1918	835	4
Mutsuki	Destroyer	Imperial Japanese Navy	1925–1927	1,315	12
Myōkō	Heavy cruiser	Imperial Japanese Navy	1927–1928	10,000	4
N	Destroyer	Royal Navy	1940–1941	1,690	8
Nagara	Light cruiser	Imperial Japanese Navy	1920–1921	5,088	6
Nagato	Battleship	Imperial Japanese Navy	1919–1920	39,130	2
Najaden	Torpedo boat	Royal Danish Navy	1943	782	2
Narwhal	Submarine	United States Navy	1928–1930	3,900	2
Navigatori	Destroyer	Regia Marina	1929–1931	2,380	12
Nelson	Battleship	Royal Navy	1925	41,250	2
Nevada	Battleship	United States Navy	1914	29,000	2
New Mexico	Battleship	United States Navy	1917	33,000	3
New Orleans (ex-Astoria)	Heavy cruiser	United States Navy	1933–1936	10,136	7
New York	Battleship	United States Navy	1912	27,000	2
North Carolina	Battleship	United States Navy	1940	47,400	2
Northampton	Heavy cruiser	United States Navy	1929–1930	9,006	6
O	Destroyer	Royal Navy	1939–1942	1,610	8
Odin	Submarine	Royal Navy	1926–1929	1,922–2,060	12
Odin	Destroyer	Royal Norwegian Navy	1939	632	3
Omaha	Light cruiser	United States Navy	1920–1924	7,050	10
Oruç Reis	Submarine	Royal Navy	1940	856	4
Orzeł	Submarine	Polish Navy	1938	1,100	2
Ōtori	Torpedo boat	Imperial Japanese Navy	1935–1937	840	8
P	Destroyer	Royal Navy	1939–1942	1,610	8
Palestro	Torpedo boat	Regia Marina	1921	1,033	4
Parthian	Submarine	Royal Navy	1929	2,070	6
Pegaso	Torpedo boat	Regia Marina	1938	840	4
Pennsylvania	Battleship	United States Navy	1915	33,000	2
Pensacola	Heavy cruiser	United States Navy	1929	9,100	2
Perla	Submarine	Regia Marina	1936	697	10
Pichincha	Coast guard vessel	Colombian National Navy		120	3
Pilo	Torpedo boat	Regia Marina	1915	770	7
Pisani	Submarine	Regia Marina	1930	880	4
Poeti	Destroyer	Regia Marina	1937	2,320	4
Porpoise	Submarine	United States Navy	1935–1937	1,310	10
Porter	Destroyer	United States Navy	1936–1937	1,834	8
Portland	Heavy cruiser	United States Navy	1931–1932	10,258	2
Proussa	Torpedo boat	Hellenic Navy	1915–1916	266	2
Q	Destroyer	Royal Navy	1941–1942	1,705	8
Queen Elizabeth	Battleship	Royal Navy	1913–1915	33,790 (as built)	5
R	Destroyer	Royal Navy	1941–1942	1,705	8
R	Submarine	United States Navy	1918–1919	570	27
R (Admiralty)	Destroyer	Royal Navy	1916–1917	940–1,052	1 / 62
Rainbow	Submarine	Royal Navy	1930	2,000	6
Regele Ferdinand	Destroyer	Romanian Naval Forces	1928–1929	1,400	2
Renown	Battlecruiser	Royal Navy	1916	32,000	2
Revenge	Battleship	Royal Navy	1914–1916	28,000	5
Richelieu	Battleship	French Navy	1939–1940	43,992	2
River (RAN Group I)	Frigate	Royal Australian Navy	1943–1945	1,420	8
River (RAN Group II)	Frigate	Royal Australian Navy	1944–1945	1,537	4
River (RCN Group)	Frigate	Royal Canadian Navy	1941–1944	1,445	70
River (RN Group I)	Frigate	Royal Navy	1941–1944	1,370	23
River (RN Group II)	Frigate	Royal Navy	1941–1944	1,400	44
Robert H. Smith	Destroyer minelayer	United States Navy	1944	2,200	12
Rudderow	Destroyer escort	United States Navy	1943-1944	1,430	22 (-1 conversion)
Rudderow (Crosley)	High speed transport	United States Navy	1943-1944	1,400	50 (+1 conversion)
S	Submarine	Royal Navy	1931–1945	950	63
S	Submarine	United States Navy	1918–1925	900	48
S	Destroyer	Royal Navy	1942–1943	1,710	8
S (Admiralty)	Destroyer	Royal Navy	1917–1918	1,092	11 / 55
S (Thornycroft)	Destroyer	Royal Navy	1917–1918	1,092	5
S (Yarrow)	Destroyer	Royal Navy	1917–1918	1,092	7
Salmon	Submarine	United States Navy	1937–1938	1,430	6
Sangamon	Escort carrier	United States Navy	1939	11,400	4
Sargo	Submarine	United States Navy	1938–1939	1,450	10
Sauro	Destroyer	Regia Marina	1926–1927	1,137	4
Scharnhorst	Battleship	Kriegsmarine	1936	38,700	2
Sella	Destroyer	Regia Marina	1927	1,480	2
Sendai	Light cruiser	Imperial Japanese Navy	1923–1925	5,113	3
Senho Type	Submarine	Imperial Japanese Navy	1943-1945	3,512-4,390	1-2
Sen-Shō Type	Submarine	Imperial Japanese Navy	1941–1943	782	18
Sentaka-Dai Type	Submarine	Imperial Japanese Navy	1945	1,290-1503	3
Sentaka-Shō Type	Submarine	Imperial Japanese Navy	1945	440	10
Sentoku Type	Submarine aircraft carrier	Imperial Japanese Navy	1944	6,560	3
Sen'yu-Shō Type	Transport submarine	Imperial Japanese Navy	1944–1945	501	10
Serrano	Destroyer	Chilean Navy	1928	1,090	6
Shiratsuyu	Destroyer	Imperial Japanese Navy	1935–1937	1,685	10
Shōkaku	Aircraft carrier	Imperial Japanese Navy	1938-1941	32,100	2
Sims	Destroyer	United States Navy	1938–1939	1,764	12
Sirena	Submarine	Regia Marina	1934	678	12
Sirtori	Torpedo boat	Regia Marina	1917	845	4
Sleipner	Destroyer	Royal Norwegian Navy	1936–1938	597	3
Søbjørnen	Minesweeper	Royal Danish Navy		270	6
Soldati	Destroyer	Regia Marina	1937–1942	1,620	19
Somers	Destroyer	United States Navy	1937–1938	2,047	5
South Dakota	Battleship	United States Navy	1941–1942	44,519	4
Spica	Torpedo boat	Regia Marina	1936–1938	640	30
Squalo	Submarine	Regia Marina	1930	933	4
St. Louis	Light cruiser	United States Navy	1939	10,000	2
Suffren	Heavy cruiser	French Navy	1927–1930	9,940	4
T	Destroyer	Royal Navy	1942–1943	1,710	8
T2	Auxiliary oil tanker	United States Navy	1939–1945	21,100–22,445	533
Tachibana	Destroyer	Imperial Japanese Navy	1919–1922	1,289	14
Tacoma	Frigate	United States Navy	1943–1945	1,400	96
Taiyō	Escort carrier	Imperial Japanese Navy	1939–1940	20,000	3
Takao	Heavy cruiser	Imperial Japanese Navy	1930–1931	9,850	4
Tambor	Submarine	United States Navy	1939–1941	1,475	12
Tench	Submarine	United States Navy	1944–1951	1,826	31
Tennessee	Battleship	United States Navy	1919	33,000	2
Thornycroft	Destroyer flotilla leader	Royal Navy	1918–1919	1,480	3 / 5
Tone	Heavy cruiser	Imperial Japanese Navy	1937–1938	11,215	2
Tordenskjold	Coastal defence ship	Royal Norwegian Navy	1897–1898	3,852	2
Town	Destroyer	Royal Navy	1917–1919	1,020–1,190	50
Town (Southampton)	Light cruiser	Royal Navy	1936	9,100	5
Town (Gloucester)	Light cruiser	Royal Navy	1937	9,400	3
Town (Edinburgh)	Light cruiser	Royal Navy	1938	10,400	2
Trad	Torpedo boat	Royal Thai Navy	1935–1937	262	9
Treasury	High endurance cutter	United States Coast Guard	1936–1937	2,700	7
Trento	Heavy cruiser	Regia Marina	1926–1932	10,511–10,890	3
Tribal	Destroyer	Royal Navy	1937–1946	1,854–1,927	27
Tromp	Light cruiser	Royal Netherlands Navy	1937–1939	3,450	2
Trygg	Torpedo boat	Royal Norwegian Navy	1919–1921	220	3
Turbine	Destroyer	Regia Marina	1927–1928	1,090	8
Type 1934	Destroyer	Kriegsmarine	1935	3,156	4
Type 1934A	Destroyer	Kriegsmarine	1935–1937	3,110	12
Type 1936	Destroyer	Kriegsmarine	1937–1938	3,415	6
Type 1936A Mob	Destroyer	Kriegsmarine	1941–1942	3,415	7
Type 1936A Narvik	Destroyer	Kriegsmarine	1939–1940	3,605	8
Type 1936B	Destroyer	Kriegsmarine	1942–1944	3,415	3
Type 23	Torpedo boat	Kriegsmarine	1926	923	6
Type 24	Torpedo boat	Kriegsmarine	1926–1927	923	6
Type 3 submergence transport vehicle	Transport submarine	Imperial Japanese Army	1943–1945	274	38
Type 35	Torpedo boat	Kriegsmarine	1937–1939	844	12
Type 37	Torpedo boat	Kriegsmarine	1938–1940	888	9
Type 39	Torpedo boat	Kriegsmarine	1940–1944	1,754	15
Type 40	Torpedo boat	Kriegsmarine	1944	2,566	7 (4 launched, but not completed)
Type 41	Torpedo boat	Kriegsmarine	1944	2,155	14 (3 launched, but not completed)
Type A Special Purpose Ship	Landing craft carrier	Imperial Japanese Army	1942–1944	11,800-11,910	3
Type C1 ship	Auxiliary cargo ship	United States Navy	1942–1945	6,240–8,015	408
Type C2 ship	Auxiliary cargo ship	United States Navy	1944–1945	13,910	173
Type C3 ship	Auxiliary cargo ship	United States Navy	1940–1947	12,000	465
Type C4 ship	Auxiliary cargo ship	United States Navy	1940–1947	11,757–12,420	75
Type D / Sen'yu-Dai Type	submarine	Imperial Japanese Navy	1943-1944	1,440	11
Type I	Submarine	Kriegsmarine	1936	892	2
Type II	Submarine	Kriegsmarine	1939–1940	300	50
Type L1	submarine	Imperial Japanese Navy	1918-1920	893	2
Type L2	submarine	Imperial Japanese Navy	1919-1922	893	4
Type L3	submarine	Imperial Japanese Navy	1920-1923	889	3
Type L4	submarine	Imperial Japanese Navy	1921-1927	988	9
Type VII	Submarine	Kriegsmarine	1935–1944	626–1,084	743
Type IX	Submarine	Kriegsmarine	1937–1944	1,032–1,616	193
Type X	Submarine	Kriegsmarine	1941–1943	1,763–2,177	8
Type XIV	Submarine	Kriegsmarine	1940–1943	1,688–1,932	10
Type XVII	Submarine	Kriegsmarine	1942–1945	277–415	7
Type XXI	Submarine	Kriegsmarine	1944–1945	1,621–1,819	118
Type XXIII	Submarine	Kriegsmarine	1944–1945	234–258	61
U	Destroyer	Royal Navy	1942–1943	1,777–1,808	8
Unryū	Aircraft carrier	Imperial Japanese Navy	1943–1944	22,534	3
V	Destroyer	Royal Navy	1942–1943	1,777–1,808	8
V (Admiralty)	Destroyer	Royal Navy	1917–1918	1,100	17 / 23
V (Admiralty leader)	Destroyer flotilla leader	Royal Navy	1917	1,207	3 / 5
V (Thornycroft)	Destroyer	Royal Navy	1917–1918	1,120	2
V7	River gunboat	Romanian Naval Forces	1943		2
Väinämöinen	Coastal defence ship	Finnish Navy	1931–1932	3,900	2
Van Galen	Destroyer	Royal Netherlands Navy	1927–1928	1,316	4
Van Ghent	Destroyer	Royal Netherlands Navy	1926–1927	1,316	4
Vasilefs Georgios	Destroyer	Hellenic Navy	1938	1,350	2
Vauquelin	Destroyer	French Navy	1931–1932	2,441	6
Vedenia	Motor torpedo boat	Romanian Naval Forces	1943–1944	30	6
Veinticinco de Mayo	Heavy cruiser	Argentine Navy	1928–1929	6,800	2
W	Destroyer	Royal Navy	1943–1944	1,710	8
W (Admiralty)	Destroyer	Royal Navy	1917–1918	1,100–1,140	32 / 33
W (Thornycroft)	Destroyer	Royal Navy	1917–1918	1,120–1,140	4
Wakatake	Destroyer	Imperial Japanese Navy	1922–1923	900	6
Wicher	Destroyer	Polish Navy	1928–1929	1,540	2
Wickes	Destroyer	United States Navy	1917–1919	1,090	33
Wyoming	Battleship	United States Navy	1911	27,000	2
X	Submarine	Royal Navy	1943–1945	30	14
XE	Submarine	Royal Navy	1943–1945	33	12
XT	Training submarine	Royal Navy	1943–1945	30	6
Yamato	Battleship	Imperial Japanese Navy	1940	71,659	2
YMS-1-class minesweeper	Minesweeper	United States Navy	1942	270	481
York	Heavy cruiser	Royal Navy	1928–1929	8,300	2
Yorktown	Aircraft carrier	United States Navy	1936–1940	23,000	3
Yūgumo	Destroyer	Imperial Japanese Navy	1941–1944	2,077	19
Z	Destroyer	Royal Navy	1943–1944	1,710	8
Wilk	Submarine	Polish Navy	1929–1955	1,250	3
Zara	Heavy cruiser	Regia Marina	1930–1931	11,680	4
Zuihō	Light aircraft carrier	Imperial Japanese Navy	1936-1942	11,443	2

== Single-ship "classes" ==
List of single-ship classes of World War II
Class	Type	Country	Launch Year	Displacement (tons)
Akagi	Aircraft carrier	Imperial Japanese Navy	1925	36,500
Algérie	Heavy cruiser	French Navy	1932	10,000
Argonaut	Submarine	United States Navy	1927	4,161
Ark Royal	Aircraft carrier	Royal Navy	1937	22,000
Aquila	Aircraft carrier	Regia Marina	N/A	23,500
Béarn	Aircraft carrier	French Navy	1920	22,146
Dristigheten	Seaplane carrier	Swedish Navy	1927	3,445
Ettore Fieramosca	Submarine	Regia Marina	1930	1,556
Graf Zeppelin	Aircraft carrier	Kriegsmarine	N/A	33,550
Hiryū	Aircraft carrier	Imperial Japanese Navy	1937	17,300
Hood	Battlecruiser	Royal Navy	1918	45,470
Hōshō	Aircraft carrier	Imperial Japanese Navy	1921	7,470
Junsen I Type Modified	cruiser submarine	Imperial Japanese Navy	1932	1,970
Junsen II Type	cruiser submarine	Imperial Japanese Navy	1935	1,900
Junsen Type A Modified 1	cruiser submarine	Imperial Japanese Navy	1944	2,434
Kaga	Aircraft carrier	Imperial Japanese Navy	1921	38,200
Kaidai I Type	submarine	Imperial Japanese Navy	1924	1,390
Kaidai II Type	submarine	Imperial Japanese Navy	1924	1,390
Kaiyō	Escort carrier	Imperial Japanese Navy	1938	13,600
M Type C Special Purpose Ship	Landing craft carrier	Imperial Japanese Army	1945	8,128
Nisshin	Seaplane tender	Imperial Japanese Navy	1939	11,317
Ōyodo	Light cruiser	Imperial Japanese Navy	1942	8,164
Ranger	Aircraft carrier	United States Navy	1933	17,577
Ryūhō	Light aircraft carrier	Imperial Japanese Navy	1942	16,700
Ryūjō	Light aircraft carrier	Imperial Japanese Navy	1931	8,000
Settembrini	Submarine	Regia Marina	1932	953
Shimakaze	Destroyer	Imperial Japanese Navy	1942	2,570
Shinano	Aircraft carrier	Imperial Japanese Navy	1944	65,800
Shinshū Maru	Landing craft carrier	Imperial Japanese Army	1934	7,100
Sōryū	Aircraft carrier	Imperial Japanese Navy	1935	16,200
Special 1TL Type escort carrier	Escort carrier	Imperial Japanese Navy	1945	10,002
Special 2TL Type escort carrier	Escort carrier	Imperial Japanese Army	1945	16,119
Surcouf	Cruiser submarine	French Navy	1929	3,250-4,304
Taihō	Aircraft carrier	Imperial Japanese Navy	1943	30,250
Type B Special Purpose Ship	Landing craft carrier	Imperial Japanese Army	1944	5,656
Type C Special Purpose Ship	Landing craft carrier	Imperial Japanese Army	1942	11,800
Type D / Sen'yu-Dai Type Modified	submarine	Imperial Japanese Navy	1944	1,440
Type D Modified	submarine	Imperial Japanese Navy	1945	1,660
Wasp	Aircraft carrier	United States Navy	1939	19,000
Wichita	Heavy cruiser	United States Navy	1935	10,589
Yūbari	Light cruiser	Imperial Japanese Navy	1923	2,890

== See also ==
- Submarines of the Imperial Japanese Navy
- List of major World War II warships built by minor powers
