= Brazilian destroyer Pernambuco =

Brazilian destroyer Pernambuco (D30) may refer to:

- Brazilian destroyer Pernambuco (1961) (pennant number D30), a Pará-class destroyer for the Brazilian Navy; the former American Fletcher class USS Hailey (DD-556); acquired by the Brazilian Navy in 1961; sunk as a target, c. 1982
- Brazilian destroyer Pernambuco (1989) (pennant number D30), the former American Garcia-class frigate USS Bradley (FF-1041); acquired by the Brazilian Navy in 1989 and classed as a destroyer; decommissioned in 2004 and held in reserve
