= Pará-class destroyer =

Pará-class destroyer may refer to:

- Pará-class destroyer (1908), a class of ten destroyers built for the Brazilian Navy between 1908 and 1910
- Pará-class destroyer (1959) or Fletcher-class destroyer, a class of destroyers built by the United States during World War II
- Pará-class destroyer (1989) four Garcia-class frigate transferred from the United States to Brazil
