= Long Island-class escort carrier =

Aircraft carrier class of the US Navy

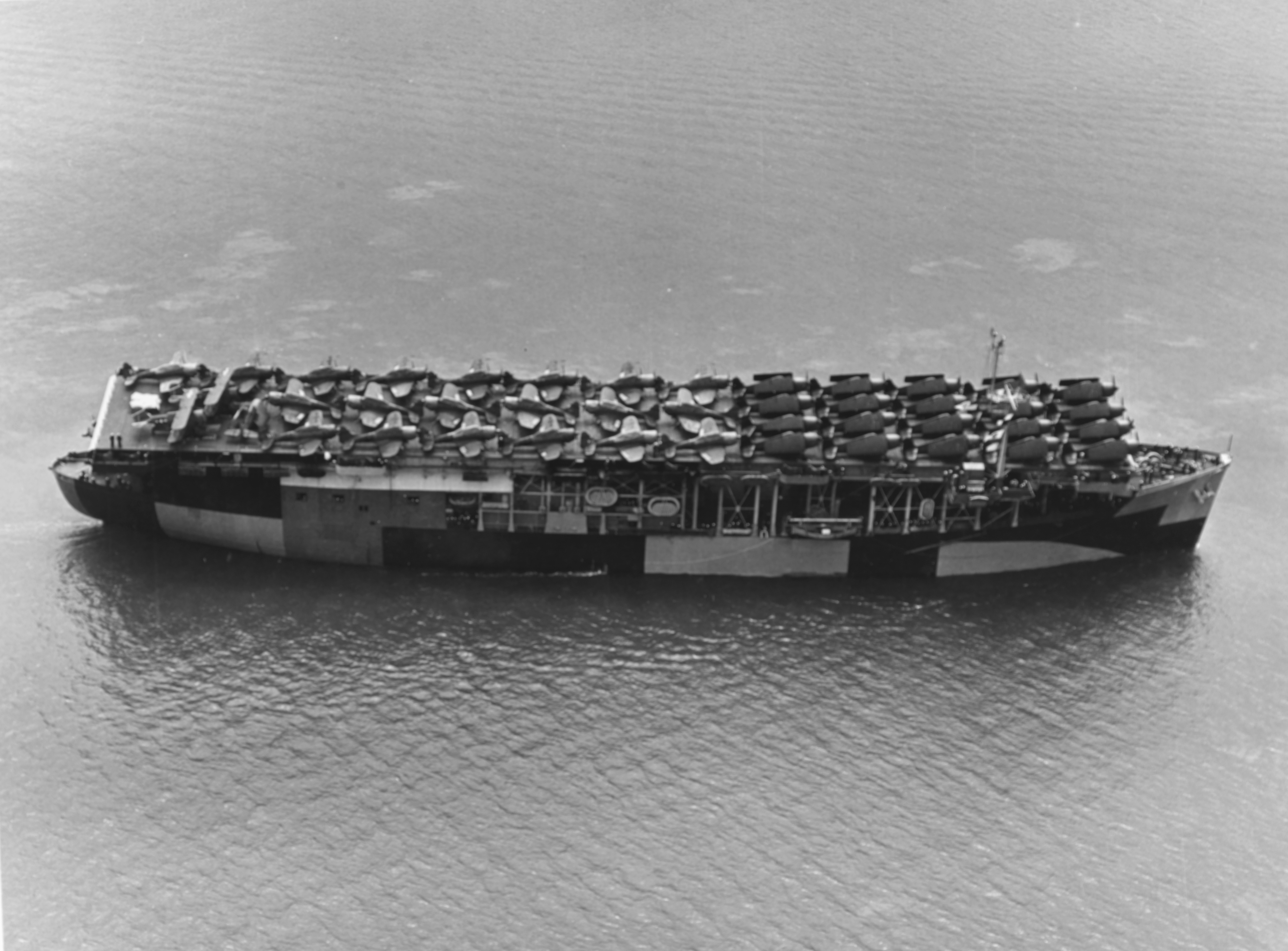
- USS Long Island (CVE-1) transporting a deck-load of aircraft.

Class overview
- Name: Long Island-class escort carrier
- Operators: United States Navy; Royal Navy
- Preceded by: N/A
- Succeeded by: Bogue class
- Completed: 2
- Retired: 2
- Scrapped: 2

General characteristics
- Type: Escort carrier
- Length: 404 ft 2.4 in (123.200 m) (length of flight deck); 465 ft (142 m) wl; 492 ft (150 m) oa
- Beam: 69.9 ft (21.3 m)
- Draft: 25 ft 2 in (7.67 m)
- Installed power: 8,500 hp (6,300 kW)
- Propulsion: 1 × diesel engine; 1 × screw
- Speed: 16.5 kn (19.0 mph; 30.6 km/h)
- Range: 10,000 nmi (12,000 mi; 19,000 km) at 14 kn (16 mph; 26 km/h)
- Complement: 856
- Sensors & processing systems: SC radar
- Aircraft carried: Hangar Capacity: 16; Flight Deck Storage: 46
- Aviation facilities: 1 × elevator

The Long Island-class escort carrier was a two-ship class, originally listed as "AVG" (Aircraft Escort Vessels). They were converted from type C3-class merchant ships.

The first ship of the class—USS Long Island, originally AVG-1, later ACV-1 then CVE-1—was launched on 11 January 1940, and served in the United States Navy through World War II.

The second and last ship of the class—HMS Archer (D78)—was launched on 14 December 1939, and served in the Royal Navy through World War II. It is also listed in U.S. Navy records as BAVG-1; the "B" presumably stood for "British".

== See also ==
- List of ship classes of the Second World War
