= Acre-class destroyer =

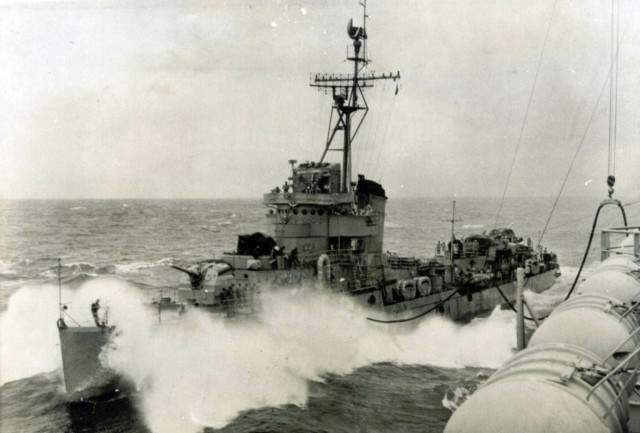
- CT Acre - D 10

Class overview
- Name: Acre class
- Builders: Ilha das Cobas, Rio de Janeiro
- Operators: Brazilian Navy
- Preceded by: Marcílio Dias class
- Succeeded by: Pará class
- Built: 1940–1949
- In commission: 1949–1974
- Completed: 6
- Retired: 6

General characteristics
- Type: Destroyer
- Displacement: 1,340 long tons (1,360 t) standard; 1,800 long tons (1,829 t) full load
- Length: 98.45 m (323 ft 0 in) oa
- Beam: 10.67 m (35 ft 0 in)
- Draught: 2.59 m (8 ft 6 in)
- Propulsion: 2 shaft Parsons geared turbines, 3 boilers 34,000 hp (25,000 kW)
- Speed: 35.5 knots (40.9 mph; 65.7 km/h)
- Complement: 150
- Armament: 4 × 1 5 inch/38 guns; 1 × 2 40 mm guns; 4 × 1 20 mm guns; 2 × 3 (Acre, Ajuricaba) or 2 × 4 (all others) 21 inch torpedo tubes; 8 depth charge throwers

The Acre-class destroyers were a class of six destroyers built during World War II for the Brazilian Navy. None were completed before the end of the war. They are also referred to in some sources as the Amazonas class.

== Design ==
Built in Brazil to a modified British design along with some U.S. equipment, they were built to replace six H-class destroyers (or Jurua class) ordered from Britain but purchased by Britain for use in the war. Due to design complications, the ships took a long time to complete, having been finished from 1949 to 1951.

The ships received a refit in the early 1960s with new electronics and gun no. 2 being replaced by a 40mm Bofors mounting. Two ships were decommissioned in 1964 and the remaining four from 1973 to 1974.

== Ships ==
List of Acre-class destroyers
Ship	Laid down	Launched	Commissioned	Decommissioned
Acre	28 December 1940	30 May 1945	10 December 1951	1974
Ajuricaba	28 December 1940	30 May 1945	December 1951	1964
Amazonas	20 July 1940	29 November 1943	10 November 1949	1973
Apa	28 December 1940	30 May 1945	December 1951	1964
Araguarí	28 December 1940	14 July 1946	23 June 1951	1974
Araguaya	20 July 1940	24 November 1943	3 September 1949	1974

== See also ==
- List of ship classes of the Second World War
