= USS Long Island (CVE-1) =

Long Island-class escort carrier

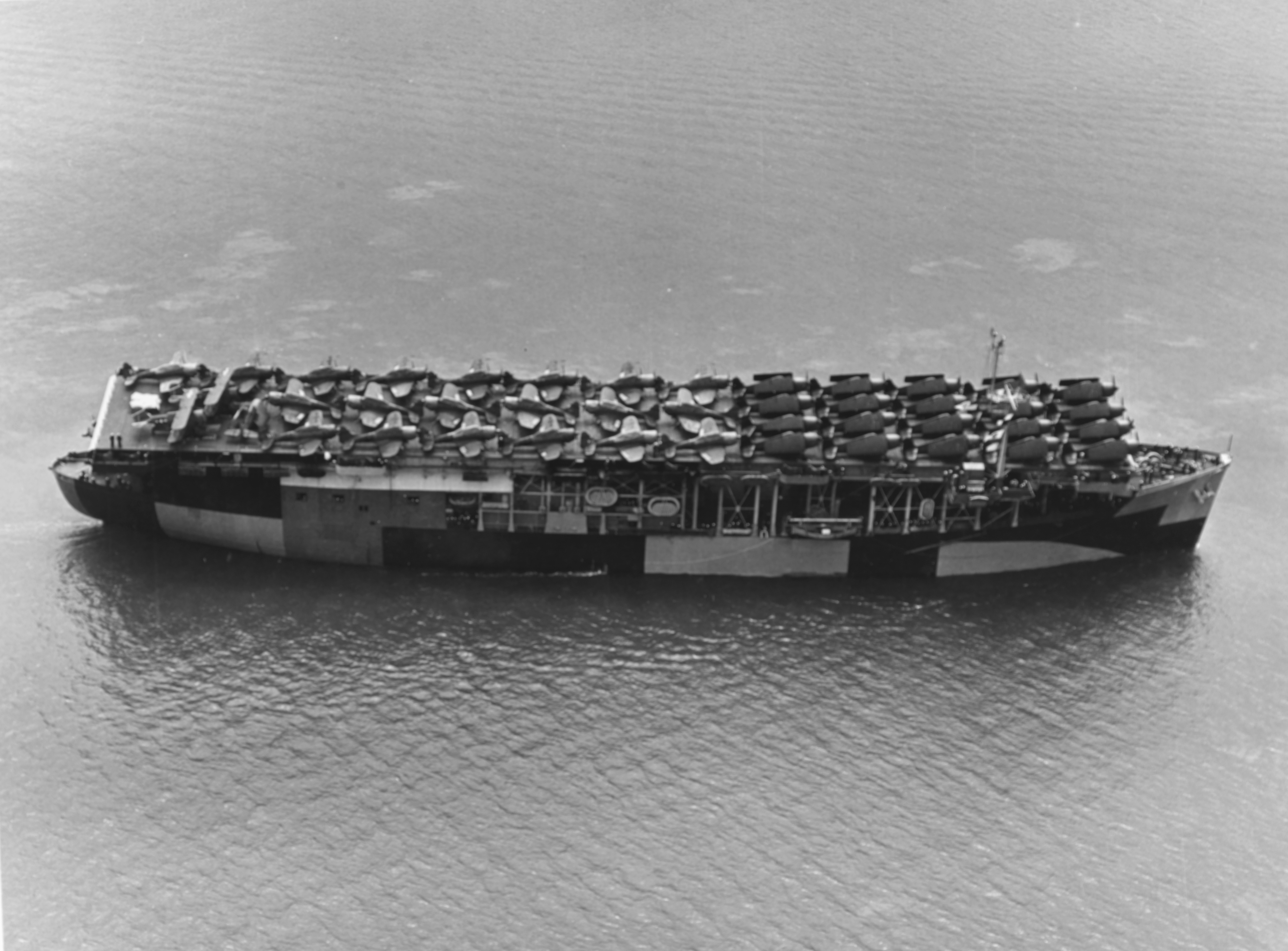
- USS Long Island

History

United States
- Name: Long Island
- Namesake: Long Island, New York
- Builder: Sun Shipbuilding & Drydock Co.
- Laid down: 7 July 1939
- Launched: 11 January 1940
- Commissioned: 2 June 1941
- Decommissioned: 26 March 1946
- Stricken: 12 April 1946
- Fate: Converted to merchant ship, scrapped in Belgium in 1977

General characteristics
- Class & type: Long Island-class escort carrier
- Displacement: 13,499 long tons (13,716 t)
- Length: 492 ft (150 m)
- Beam: 69 ft 6 in (21.18 m)
- Draft: 25 ft 8 in (7.82 m)
- Installed power: 8,500 hp (6,300 kW)
- Propulsion: diesel, 1 shaft (details)
- Speed: 16.5 kn (19.0 mph; 30.6 km/h)
- Complement: 970 officers and enlisted
- Armament: 1 × 5 in (130 mm)/51 cal gun; 2 × 3 in (76 mm)/50 cal guns
- Aircraft carried: 30

USS Long Island (CVE-1) (originally AVG-1 and then ACV-1) was lead ship of her class and the first escort carrier of the United States Navy. She was also the second ship to be named after Long Island, New York.

== Construction and commissioning ==
Long Island was laid down on 7 July 1939, as the C-3 cargo liner Mormacmail, under Maritime Commission contract, by the Sun Shipbuilding and Drydock Company, Chester, Pennsylvania as Yard No 185, launched on 11 January 1940, sponsored by Ms. Dian B. Holt, acquired by the Navy on 6 March 1941, and commissioned on 2 June 1941, Commander Donald B. Duncan in command.

== Service history ==
=== World War II ===
In the tense months before the attack on Pearl Harbor, Long Island operated out of Norfolk, Virginia, conducting experiments to prove the feasibility of aircraft operations from converted cargo ships. The data gathered by her crew greatly improved the combat readiness of later "baby flattops". Just after the Japanese attack, she escorted a convoy to Newfoundland and qualified carrier pilots at Norfolk before departing for the West Coast on 10 May 1942. Reaching San Francisco on 5 June, the ship immediately joined Admiral William S. Pye's Task Force One (TF 1); consisting of seven battleships and provided air cover while at sea to protect the West Coast of the United States and reinforce Admiral Chester Nimitz's forces before, during and after their victory in the Battle of Midway. She left the formation on 17 June and returned to the West Coast to resume carrier pilot training.

Long Island departed San Diego on 8 July and arrived Pearl Harbor on 17 July. After a training run south to Palmyra Island, she loaded two squadrons of Marine Corps aircraft and got underway for the South Pacific on 2 August. Touching at Fiji on 13 August, she then steamed to a point 200 mi (170 nmi; 320 km) southeast of Guadalcanal and launched her aircraft (19 Grumman F4F Wildcats and 12 Douglas SBD Dauntless dive bombers). These planes, the first to reach Henderson Field, were instrumental in the Guadalcanal campaign and went on to compile a distinguished war record. Her mission was accomplished. Reclassified ACV-1 on 20 August, Long Island sailed for Vila, Efate Island, New Hebrides, and arrived on 17 August. She departed on 18 August but returned to Vila, on Efate, from 23 August to 31 August. She sailed on 1 September for Espiritu Santo, before departing from there the same day for San Diego.

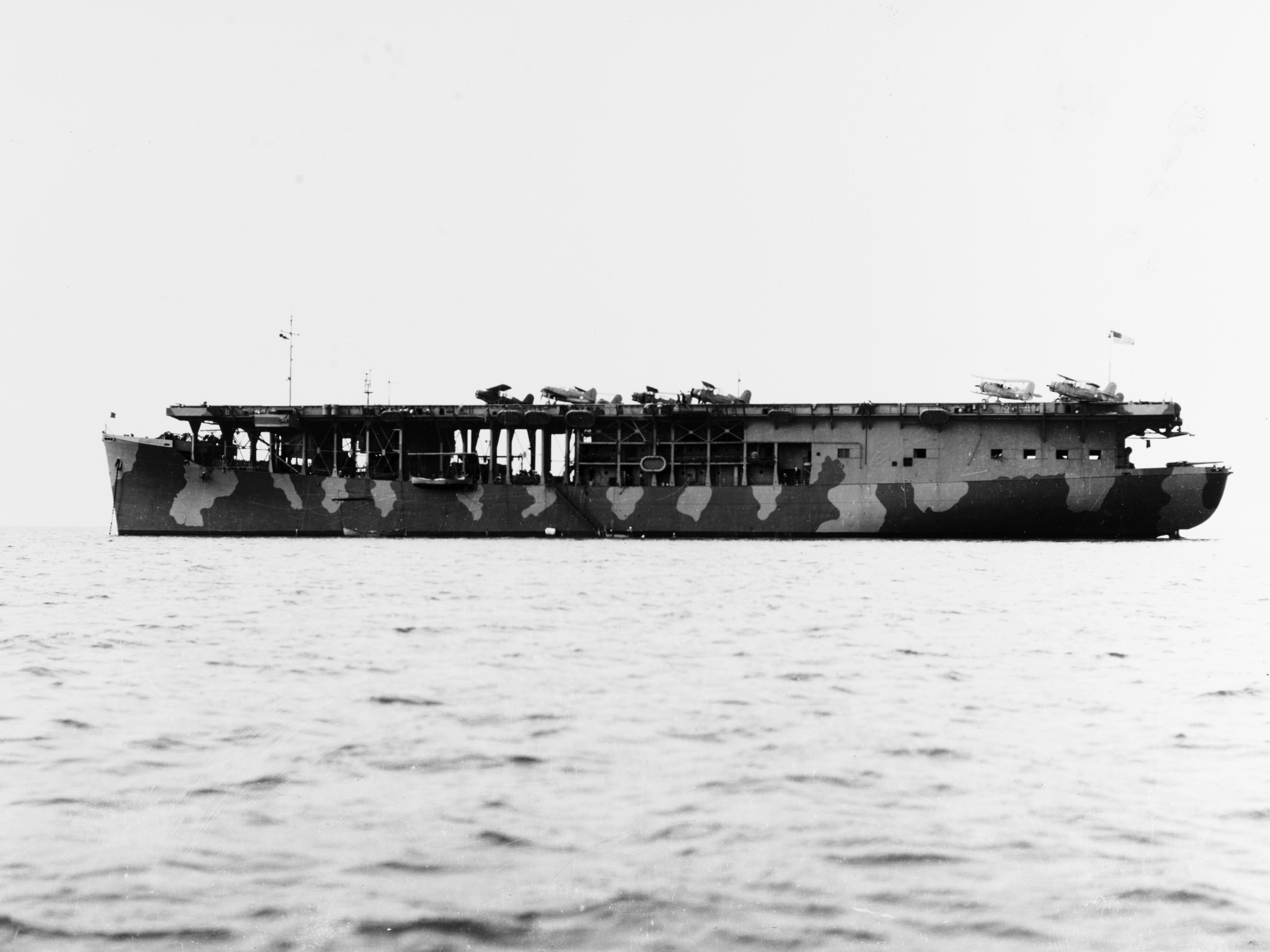
Long Island in sea camouflage, November 1941. Seven SOC Seagull scout planes and one F2A3 Buffalo fighter are on deck.

Long Island's actions at Guadalcanal are mentioned and seen in the movie Flying Leathernecks.

Long Island returned to the West Coast on 20 September, as the new "baby flattops" took up the slack in the Pacific war zones. For the next year, the escort carrier trained carrier pilots at San Diego. Long Island was reclassified CVE-1 on 15 July 1943. In 1944–1945, she transported airplanes and their crews from the West Coast to various outposts in the Pacific. After V-J Day, she revisited many of these same bases while transporting soldiers and sailors back home during Operation Magic Carpet.

=== Post-war ===
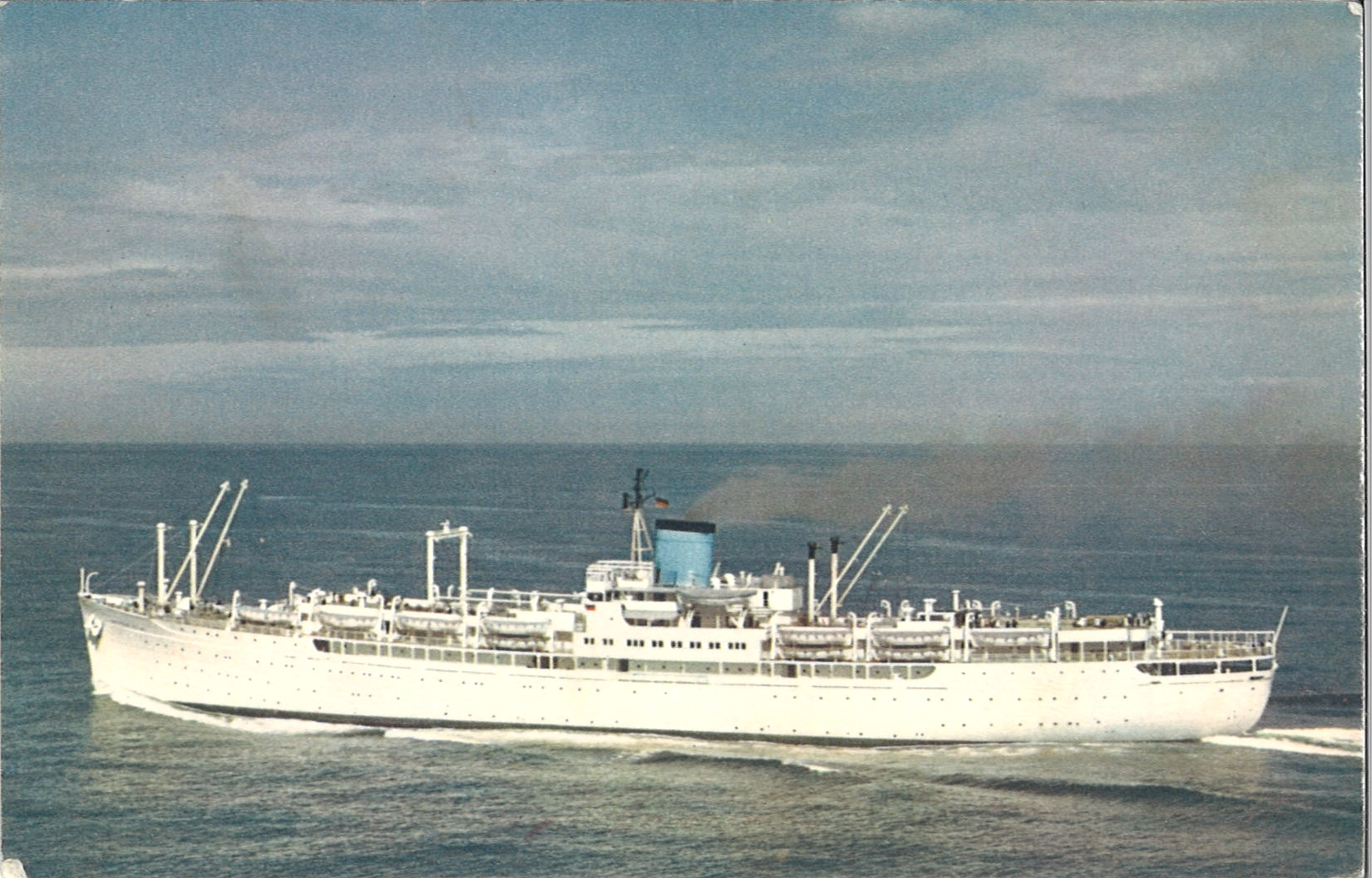
Postcard depicting Seven Seas underway

Long Island decommissioned on 26 March 1946 at Puget Sound Naval Shipyard. Struck from the Naval Vessel Register on 12 April, she was sold to Zidell Ship Dismantling Company of Portland, Oregon on 24 April 1947 for scrapping. However, on 12 March 1948, she was acquired by the Canada-Europe Line for conversion to merchant service. Upon completion of conversion in 1949, she was renamed Nelly, and served as an immigrant carrier between Europe, Australia and Canada.

Beginning in 1963, she operated as Seven Seas for the California-based University of the Seven Seas (now known as Semester at Sea study-abroad program. After Chapman College became the program's academic sponsor in the mid-1960s, she continued worldwide student voyages under Chapman sponsorship until 1971.

On 17 July 1965, she had a serious fire and was towed to St John's, Newfoundland, for repairs. She was repaired and started her last voyage on 13 September 1966. She was bought the same year and employed by Rotterdam University as a students' hostel until 1971, when she was sold by Holland America. She then served as a migrant hostel until 1977, when she was scrapped in Belgium.

== Awards ==
Long Island received one battle star for her World War II service.
