= Type 44 torpedo boat =

Nazi Germany's Kriegsmarine's torpedo boats

- Line drawing of the Type 44

Class overview
- Name: Type 44
- Builders: Schichau, Elbing
- Operators: Kriegsmarine
- Preceded by: Type 41 torpedo boat
- Succeeded by: None
- Planned: 6 or 9
- Completed: 0
- Canceled: All

General characteristics
- Type: Torpedo boat
- Displacement: 1,418 long tons (1,441 t) (standard); 1,794 long tons (1,823 t) (deep load)
- Length: 103 m (337 ft 11 in) (o/a); 98 m (321 ft 6 in) (waterline)
- Beam: 10.1 m (33 ft 2 in)
- Draft: 3.7 m (12 ft 2 in)
- Installed power: 4 × water-tube boilers; 52,000 shp (39,000 kW)
- Propulsion: 2 × shafts; 2 × geared steam turbine sets
- Speed: 37 knots (69 km/h; 43 mph)
- Range: 4,500 nmi (8,300 km; 5,200 mi) at 19 knots (35 km/h; 22 mph)
- Complement: 222
- Armament: 2 × twin 10.5 cm (4.1 in) dual-purpose guns; 5 × twin 3.7 cm (1.5 in) AA guns; 2 × triple 533 mm (21 in) torpedo tubes; 30 × mines

The Type 44 torpedo boats were a group of six or nine torpedo boats that were designed for Nazi Germany's Kriegsmarine during World War II. Ordered in 1944, none of the ships were laid down before the German surrender in May 1945.

== Background and description ==
Much like the preceding Type 39 torpedo boats, the Type 44s were intended for general-purpose duties. Unhappy with the excess steam consumption of the Type 39's engine auxiliary machinery, the Kriegsmarine experimented with using three-phase electric motors to power the auxiliary machinery and partially automating its operations under the direction of Dipl.-Ing. Illies at Schichau-Werke's shipyard in Elbing, East Prussia. One boiler system was built there for trials and full-size mockups of turbine and boiler rooms were also constructed. Although attracted by the prospect of greater efficiency at lower speeds than the existing propulsion machinery, the Kriegsmarine did not believe that the "Illies-Schichau" machinery was ready for use until 1944 when the Type 44 was being designed.

The ships would have had an overall length of 103 meters (337 ft 11 in) and would have been 98 meters (321 ft 6 in) long at the waterline. They were designed with a beam of 10.1 meters (33 ft 2 in), and a maximum draft of 3.7 meters (12 ft 2 in) at deep load. The Type 44s would have displaced 1,418 long tons (1,441 t) at standard load and 1,794 long tons (1,823 t) at deep load. Their hull was intended to be divided into 12 watertight compartments and it was designed with a double bottom that covered 70% of their length. They would have been manned by 8 officers and 214 sailors. (Note: Whitley gives different dimensions and displacements. He says that they would have been 97 meters (318 ft 3 in) long at the waterline with a beam of 10 meters (32 ft 10 in), and a maximum draft of 3.56 meters (11 ft 8 in) at deep load. Their displacement would have been 1,821 long tons (1,850 t) at deep load and their crew would have numbered 160.)

The Type 44 ships would have had two sets of Wagner geared steam turbines, each driving a single propeller, using steam provided by four Wagner water-tube boilers that operated at a pressure of 70 kg/cm^{2} (6,865 kPa; 996 psi) and a temperature of 460 °C (860 °F). The turbines were designed to produce 52,000 shaft horsepower (39,000 kW) for a speed of 37 knots (69 km/h; 43 mph). The ships carried a maximum of 300 metric tons (295 long tons) of fuel oil which was intended to give them a range of 4,500 nautical miles (8,300 km; 5,200 mi) at 19 knots (35 km/h; 22 mph). The new machinery was estimated to reach a speed of 25 knots (46 km/h; 29 mph) with only 19 standard atmospheres (20 kg/cm^{2}; 280 psi) of pressure, greatly increasing the range compared to earlier torpedo boats with the same boilers. (Note: Whitley gives a range of 1,900 nmi (3,500 km; 2,200 mi).)

=== Armament ===
The planned main armament of the Type 44s would have been four of the new 10.5-centimeter (4.1 in) KM44 dual-purpose guns in two twin-gun mounts, one each fore and aft of the superstructure. The mount had an elevation range of -15° to +75°. The KM44 fired 15.5-or-17-kilogram (34 or 37 lb) projectiles at muzzle velocities of either 835 or 785 m/s (2,740 or 2,580 ft/s), respectively. The 17-kilogram shell had a range of 19,000 meters (21,000 yd) at an elevation of +48°. The gun had a rate of fire of 12–14 rounds per minute and the ships were designed to carry 400 rounds per gun. An anti-aircraft director would have been installed on the roof of the bridge. Dedicated anti-aircraft defense would have been provided by ten 3.7-centimeter (1.5 in) guns (Note: Whitley says eight 3-centimeter (1.2 in) FLK44 guns, although no such gun is listed by Campbell.) in five twin mounts for which 20,000 rounds would have been stowed. The Type 44s would also have been equipped with six above-water 533-millimeter (21.0 in) torpedo tubes in two triple mounts amidships and to carry 30 mines.

== Construction ==
The Kriegsmarine ordered nine Type 44s (T52–T60) from Schichau on 28 March 1944 with yard numbers 1720–1745 and 1447–1449. (Note: Whitley says only T52–T57 were ordered.) The ships were scheduled for completion beginning on 15 September 1946, but none of them were laid down before the contracts were canceled when the shipyard was forced to close by advancing Soviet forces in January 1945.
