= HMS Archer (D78) =

Long Island-class escort carrier

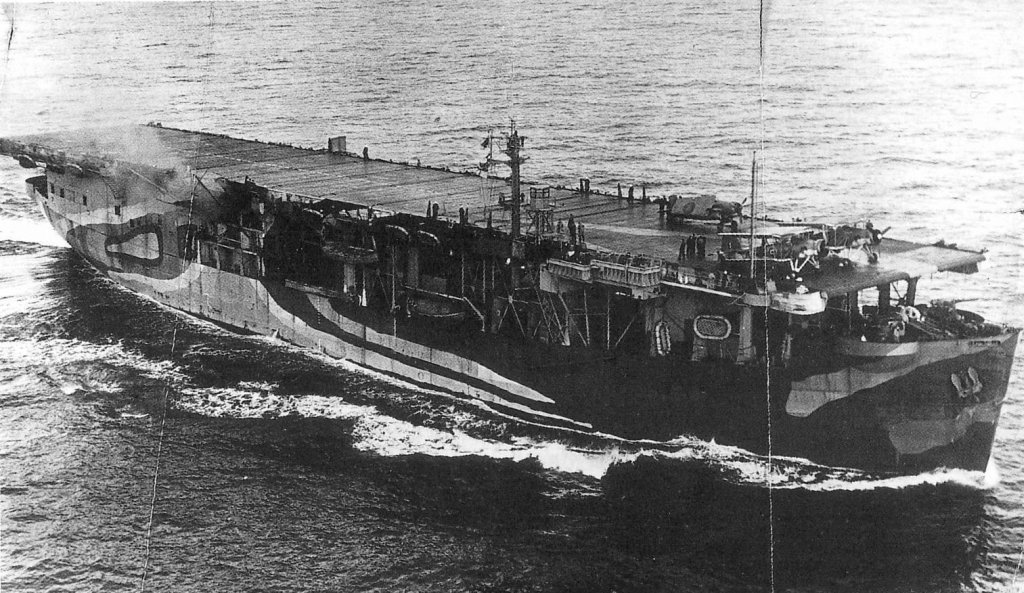
- HMS Archer

History
- Name: Mormacland
- Owner: United States Maritime Commission
- Operator: Moore-McCormack Lines
- Port of registry: (United States) New York
- Ordered: C3
- Builder: Sun Shipbuilding & Drydock Co., Chester, Pennsylvania
- Yard number: 184
- Laid down: 1 August 1939
- Launched: 14 December 1939
- Completed: 24 April 1940
- Identification: US Official Number 239370

United Kingdom
- Name: HMS Archer (BAVG-1)
- Commissioned: 17 November 1941
- Identification: Pennant number: BAVG-1, D78
- Decommissioned: 6 November 1943
- Stricken: 26 February 1946
- Honours and awards: Atlantic 1943–44, Biscay 1944
- Name: 1945: Empire Lagan; 1946: Archer; 1948: Anna Salén; 1955: Tasmania; 1961: Union Reliance
- Owner: 1945: Ministry of War Transport; 1946: United States Maritime Commission; 1948: Rederi Pulp AB; 1955: Compagnia Navigazione Tasmania SA; 1961: China Union Lines
- Operator: 1944: Blue Funnel Line; 1945: A Holt & Co; 1946: United States Maritime Commission; 1948: Sven Salén, Sweden; 1949: Rederi Pulp AB; 1955: Hellenic Mediterranean Lines; 1961: China Union Lines, Taiwan
- Port of registry: 1945: (United Kingdom) London; 1946: United States; 1948: (Sweden) Stockholm; 1955: (Greece) Piraeus; 1961: (Taiwan) Taipei
- Fate: Scrapped in New Orleans in 1962

General characteristics
- Class & type: Long Island-class escort carrier
- Tonnage: 7,886 GRT (Mormacland); 13,399 GRT (Empire Lagan); 11,762 GRT (Anna Salén, Tasmania); 7,368 GRT (Tasmania, Union Reliance); 11,976 DWT (Mormacland)
- Displacement: 9,000 long tons (9,100 t) standard; 15,700 long tons (16,000 t) full load (HMS Archer)
- Length: 461 ft 1 in (140.54 m) (Mormacland); 468 ft 4 in (142.75 m) (Empire Lagan)
- Beam: 69 ft 7 in (21.21 m) (Mormacland, Empire Lagan)
- Depth: 29 ft 1 in (8.86 m) (Mormacland); 39 ft 7 in (12.07 m) (Empire Lagan)
- Propulsion: 4 × 7 -ylinder SCSA diesel engines (Busch-Sulzer Bros Diesel Engine Co, St Louis) 2,060 hp (1,540 kW) (each) driving a single screw through electro-magnetic couplings and single reduction gearing.
- Speed: 16.5 knots (30.6 km/h; 19.0 mph)
- Range: 14,550 nmi (26,950 km; 16,740 mi) at 10 knots (19 km/h; 12 mph)
- Capacity: 1,500 passengers (Anna Salén, Tasmania)
- Complement: 555 (HMS Archer)
- Armament: 3 × 4 in (102 mm) guns, 4 × twin and 7 × single machine guns. (HMS Archer); 7 × 20 mm guns AA guns; 4 twin 20 mm AA guns (HMS Archer)
- Aircraft carried: 15 (HMS Archer)
- Notes: Aviation facilities:-; 1 lift, 1 catapult, 9 arrester wires and; 3 barriers. (HMS Archer)

HMS Archer was a Long Island-class escort carrier built by the United States in 1939–1940 and operated by the Royal Navy during World War II. She was built as the cargo ship Mormacland, but was converted to an escort carrier and renamed HMS Archer. Her transmission was a constant cause of problems which led to her being withdrawn from front-line service. She was used as a stores ship and then as an accommodation ship before a refit and subsequent use as a merchant aircraft ferry ship, Empire Lagan.

She was returned to the US Navy, then laid up as Archer before being sold into merchant service and converted to a passenger ship, Anna Salén. She was used to take emigrants to Australia and Canada in the early 1950s. She was sold and renamed Tasmania and after further service as an emigrant ship was converted back to a cargo ship. She was later sold and renamed Union Reliance. She was scrapped after a collision and fire in 1961.

== Description and construction ==
Mormacland was laid down as a Type C3 cargo ship on 1 August 1939, under United States Maritime Commission contract (MC Hull 46), by the Sun Shipbuilding and Drydock Company, Chester, Pennsylvania, as Yard number 184. She was launched on 14 December 1939 and completed on 24 April 1940.

She was powered by four 2,225 bhp (1,659 kW) seven-cylinder two-stroke single-acting diesel engines. These drove a single screw via Westinghouse electro-magnetic slip couplings and Falk single reduction gears. The engines were built by Busch-Sulzer Brothers Diesel Engine Co, St Louis, Missouri with 20½ inches bore and 27 inches stroke (520 mm by 690 mm). They developed a total of 2,060 horsepower (1,540 kW) each. As HMS Archer, she had a range of 14,550 nautical miles (26,950 km) at 10 knots (19 km/h). The propulsion system was also used on the four sister ships built by Sun Shipbuilding in 1939: Mormacpenn, Mormacyork, Mormacland and Mormacmail

HMS Archer was the only Long Island-class escort carrier in service with the Royal Navy during the Second World War. She was converted from the American merchant ship Mormacland which was built at the Sun Shipbuilding and Drydock Company. She was laid down on 1 August 1939, launched on 14 December 1939 and delivered on 24 April 1940.

She was converted to an escort aircraft carrier at Newport News Shipbuilding & Drydock Co, Newport News, Virginia and commissioned into the Royal Navy on 17 November 1941.

Archer had a complement of 555 men and an overall length of 492.25 feet (150.04 m), a beam of 66.25 feet (20.19 m) and a height of 23.25 ft (7.09 m). She displaced 8,200 long tons (8,332 t) at normal load and 9,000 long tons (9,144 t) at deep load. Propulsion was provided by four diesel engines connected to one shaft giving 8,500 brake horsepower (6,300 kW), which could propel the ship at 16.5 knots (30.6 km/h; 19.0 mph).

Aircraft facilities were a small combined bridge–flight control on the starboard side and above the 410-foot (120 m)-long wooden flight deck, one aircraft lift 43 by 34 feet (13 by 10 m), one aircraft catapult and nine arrestor wires. Aircraft could be housed in the 190 by 47 feet (58 by 14 m) half hangar below the flight deck. Armament comprised three single mounted 4-inch dual purpose anti-aircraft guns and fifteen 20 mm cannons on single or twin mounts. She had the capacity for fifteen aircraft which could be a mixture of Grumman Martlet or Hawker Sea Hurricane fighter aircraft and Fairey Swordfish or Grumman Avenger anti-submarine aircraft.

== Service history ==
Mormacland was assessed at 7,889 GRT. She was operated by Moore-McCormack Lines Inc., with New York as her homeport, until 6 March 1941 when she was requisitioned by the United States Navy and sent to Newport News Shipbuilding & Drydock Co, Newport News, Virginia, for conversion to an aircraft carrier.

=== BAVG 1 ===
When requisitioned by the US Navy, Mormacland was designated BAVG-1, the first hull of the series intended for delivery to the Royal Navy. The conversion consisted of a lightweight wooden flight deck on a truss frame being added on top of the ship which covered about 70% of the ship's length. The deck was serviced by a single lift aft where the aircraft hangar was situated. The conversion was completed on 15 November 1941. As converted, she was transferred to the Royal Navy.

Archer was a sister of the USS Long Island. Like the Long Island, the Archer had no island structure. Her original bridge was retained and extended at the sides to provide visibility. Her funnel was replaced by twin diesel vents to either side of the flight deck. Her Busch-Sulzer engines sometimes produced so much black smoke that landing aircraft couldn't see the batman or flight deck.

=== HMS Archer ===
Two days after the conversion was completed, BAVG-1 was transferred to and commissioned in the Royal Navy as part of the Lend-Lease program. On 23 December 1941, three US Navy Grumman F4F Wildcats landed on Archer for trials to the launch accelerator. The accelerator misfired, causing the first aircraft to dive into the sea as sufficient airspeed had not been gained. The remaining two aircraft were successfully flown off. Archer put into the Philadelphia Naval Shipyard on 24 December 1941 for repairs to the accelerator, which had been damaged in the misfire. On 2 January 1942, Archer successfully completed her sea trials. On 9 January, she sailed down the Delaware River bound for Norfolk, Virginia, where she was to load aircraft for ferrying to the United Kingdom. Her gyro compass failed near Goose Island and then her engines developed problems. After repairs were effected she arrived at Norfolk and on 12 January she embarked eleven Martlet Is.

She departed Norfolk on 13 January but was soon in trouble, as her steering developed a fault and her gyro compass failed. Repairs were made and she set course for Kingston, Jamaica. Later that day Archer had a collision with the 4,497 GRT U.S. freighter Brazos some 200 nautical miles (370 km; 230 mi) east of Charleston, South Carolina (32°54′N 74°14′W). Archer sustained damage to her bow, and eventually settled down at the bow by 5 degrees after the damage and flooding had been contained. Both ships were dead in the water. The 35 crewmembers of Brazos transferred to Archer in their own lifeboats and Brazos sank on 14 January. Archer's captain had radioed for assistance and at first light started to make for the coast, but as her propeller was half out of the water, progress was minimal. On 16 January, Archer rendezvoused with US Coast Guard tug Tallapoosa which unsuccessfully attempted to tow Archer. It was decided that Archer should continue under her own power until a more powerful tug could assist her. On 17 January, Cherokee reached her and proceeded to tow her to Charleston, where she arrived on 21 January. She entered dry dock on 28 January for repairs, which took about six weeks.

On 7 March 1942, Archer embarked twelve Martlets for delivery to HMS Illustrious and her own four Fairey Swordfish aircraft of 834 Squadron which had flown out from Jamaica. She sailed on 18 March for San Juan, Puerto Rico, in company with HMS Devonshire and two destroyers as part of Convoy AS 2. On 22 March Archer again had problems with her steering gear. She put into San Juan on 23 March and rejoined the convoy on 24 March. Anti-submarine patrols were carried out without a sighting, although one Swordfish was badly damaged on 30 March when it lost its tailhook and ended up in the safety barrier. Although her engines and gyro compass continued to give trouble, she arrived at Freetown. Sierra Leone on 3 April. On 9 April, Archer's twelve brand new Martlets were transferred to Illustrious and two Martlets from Illustrious were transferred to Archer.

On 15 June 1942, one of her Swordfish aircraft became the first ever aircraft to land on Ascension Island. The aircraft's crew were looking for survivors from SS Lyle Park which had been sunk by U-752. They landed to pass on a message destined for the Admiralty.

Archer's powerplant continued to give trouble, particularly the electro-magnetic clutches. If the clutch disengaged the engines would race at high revs and had to be shut down in order for repairs to be made. This was particularly problematic if aircraft were flying or there were enemy submarines nearby. On 26 June, Archer departed Freetown bound for Bermuda, where she was to undergo repairs. Work started on 15 July and took some fourteen weeks to complete. Archer then sailed to New York City where she joined Convoy UGS 2 which departed New York on 2 November bound for Casablanca, Morocco. She ferried 30 Curtiss P-40 Warhawks and US personnel to Casablanca. She then sailed to Gibraltar to join convoy MKF 3 which departed Gibraltar on 27 November. When Archer arrived in the UK, she was sent to Liverpool for another refit which commenced on 4 December. Her flight deck was lengthened at this refit.

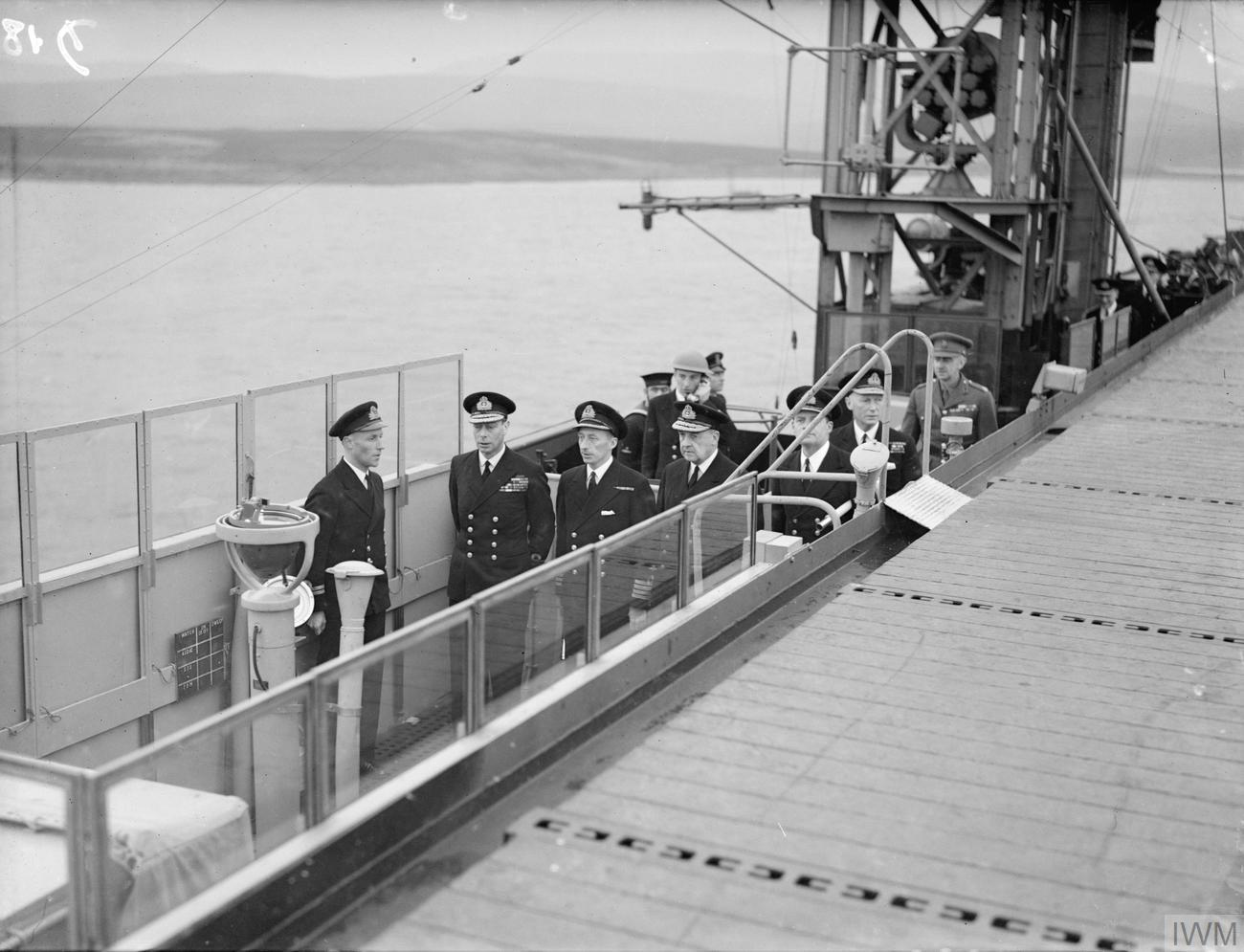
King George VI on the bridge, on his left is the captain of HMS Archer and Admiral Commanding Aircraft Carriers, Admiral Lyster

On 19 February 1943, Archer embarked nine Martlet Vs of 892 Squadron and on 28 February embarked nine Swordfish Mk II aircraft of 819 Squadron. She was inspected by King George VI the following day and then sent to shipyards on the Clyde and at Belfast for further rectification work. In early May, Archer joined the 4th Escort Group off Iceland on convoy support operations. She joined Convoy ONS 6 on 9 May and then Convoy ON 182 on 12 May, leaving these convoys on 14 May. On 21 May she joined Convoy HX 239. On 23 May, a Swordfish II of 819 Squadron sank U-752 with a Rocket Spear, a new weapon, at 51°48′N 29°32′W. The thirteen survivors were rescued by HMS Escapade. U-752 was the first German U-boat to be sunk with rockets and only the second to be sunk by aircraft that operated from an escort aircraft carrier. Archer left Convoy HX 239 on 24 May. She then joined Convoy KMS 18B on 26 June and left that convoy on 3 July. She was then withdrawn from the 4th Escort Group to take part in exercises in the Irish Sea. Following these exercises, she was sent to the Bay of Biscay on anti-submarine patrol duty, but was withdrawn from this after a week due to a lack of U-boat activity and further defects. She arrived at Devonport on 27 July and work commenced the following day. Archer then sailed to the Clyde for engine repairs, arriving on 3 August.

It was found that Archer had extensive defects and she was decommissioned with effect from 6 November 1943. She was relegated to use as a stores ship at Gare Loch. In March 1944, Archer was towed to Loch Alsh where she was used as an accommodation ship until August when she was sent to Belfast for repairs to enable her to be used as an aircraft ferry ship. Repairs were to take seven and a half months.

Archer was the first of thirty-eight US-built converted C3 Escort Carriers turned over to Great Britain during the period 1941–1944, and one of five motor ships (the remainder were powered by geared turbines). Unlike the others, Archer was powered by four diesel engines instead of two.

=== Empire Lagan ===
On completion of the repairs on 15 March 1945, HMS Archer was transferred to the Ministry of War Transport and renamed Empire Lagan. She was used to ferry aircraft to the United Kingdom. Converted to a cargo ship, she operated under the management of the Blue Funnel Line and later A Holt & Co. Empire Lagan was homeported in London. Empire Lagan returned to the US in Convoy UC 69, which departed Liverpool on 24 May 1945 and arrived at New York on 3 June 1945. She then sailed to Norfolk, Virginia.

=== Archer ===
On 9 January 1946, Empire Lagan was returned to the US Navy and renamed USS Archer. She was stricken from the US Navy register on 26 February 1946. MV Archer was laid up at Norfolk, Virginia. On 30 September 1947 she was sold to Mr J F Luley, New York for commercial service.

=== Anna Salén ===
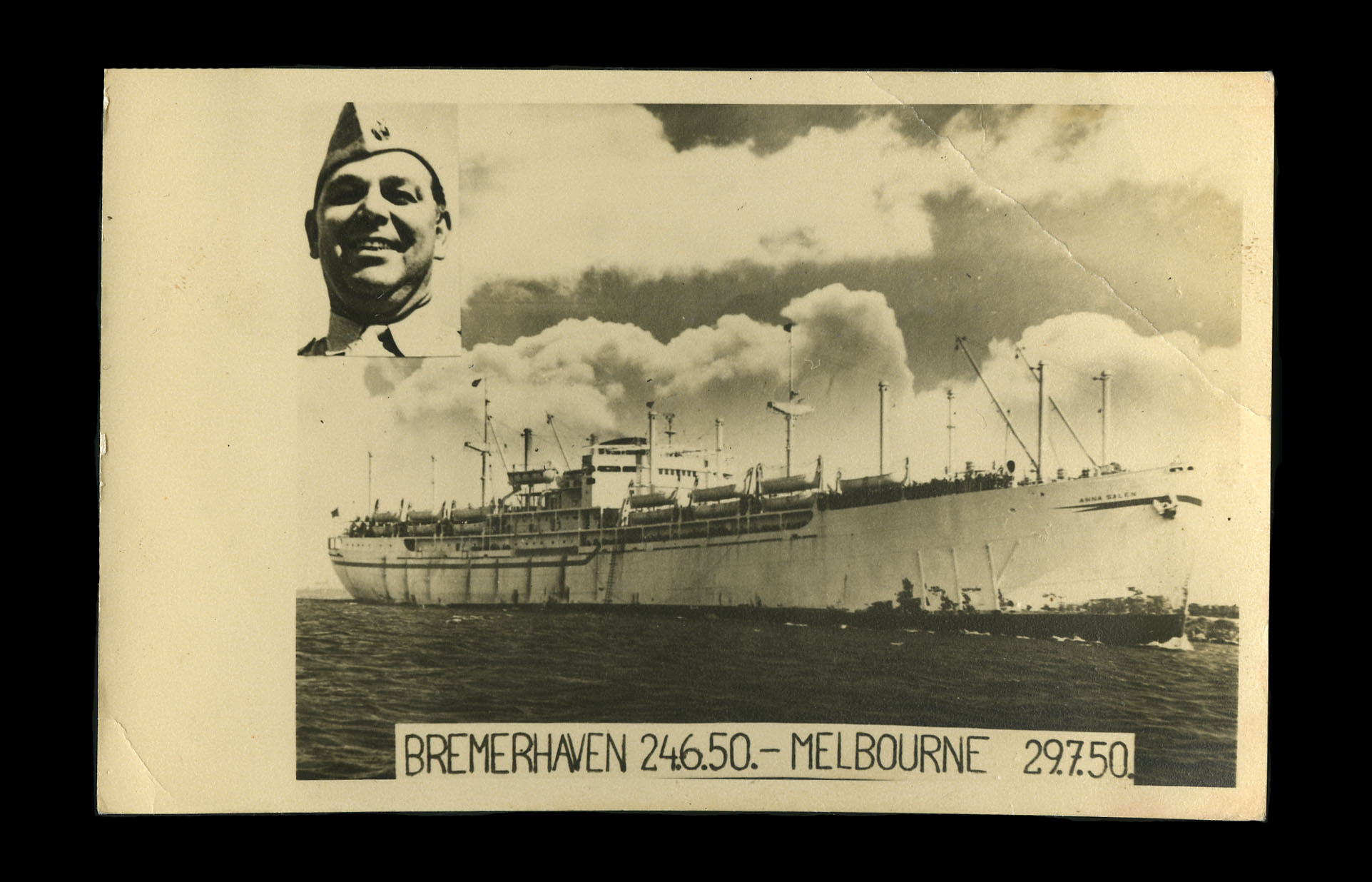
Anna Salen in 1950. Titled 'Bremerhaven 24.6.50 Melbourne 29.7.50' with insert photograph presumably of Frank Kolarik, Czech migrant 1950. Photograph from Australian National Maritime Museum

In 1948 Archer was bought by Swedish businessman Sven Salén, and registered under the ownership of Rederi Pulp AB; her homeport was Stockholm. She was renamed Anna Salén and, after initial conversion into a bulk carrier at the Bethlehem Shipyard in Baltimore, took a load of coal from the US to Italy. By this time the owners had obtained a contract from the International Refugee Organization to transport Displaced Persons from Europe to Australia and Canada. After arrival in Italy, Anna Salén was then converted to a passenger ship, with basic accommodation being built into the cargo holds and the superstructure being extended from the foc's'le to the stern. There was accommodation for 1500 passengers in a single class. After the rebuild she was 11,672 GRT. Her maiden voyage as a passenger ship (22 May—21 June 1949) was from Naples, Italy, to Melbourne and Sydney. In December 1949, on her fourth voyage to Australia as Anna Salén she broke down in the Indian Ocean and limped into Aden, where her passengers were transferred to another ship, the Skaugum, to complete their voyage. After repairs were completed, Anna Salén resumed service. Her next two voyages, beginning on 20 June and 27 November 1950, departed from Bremerhaven bound for Australia. During the latter journey, one of the emigrants, Herr Gustav Kovaks, made a film about the voyage. It was later widely shown in Germany to give people a view of how the emigration process worked. Anna Salén arrived at Fremantle on 31 December 1950 and sailed for Melbourne later that day. It was realised that she couldn't make Melbourne before the New Year, so for political reasons Anna Salén was ordered back to Fremantle where all 1,522 passengers were disembarked.

In the early to mid-1950s, Anna Salén was used between Europe, Saigon and Australia. On 8 September 1951, Ursula K. Le Guin and her brother Karl Kroeber sailed from Southampton to New York on Anna Salén, returning from a holiday in Europe. Later that year, on 26 December 1951, Anna Salén came across the Canadian coaster SS Mayfall flying a distress signal. She had encountered bad weather and run out of fuel. Anna Salén towed Mayfall to St Johns and then continued her journey to Halifax On 13 August 1952, Anna Salén collided with the 18,369 GRT Norwegian whaler SS Thorshovdi in the Pentland Firth. She put into Lyness with damage to her bows. On 2 July 1953 Anna Salén departed Bremen, West Germany to make a round trip to Quebec, Canada The journey took seven days. She continued to transport new migrants to Australia through 1954. She was sold in 1955 to a Greek buyer.

=== Tasmania ===
Anna Salén was bought by Compagnia Navigazione Tasmania SA, Piraeus and renamed Tasmania. She was placed under the management of Hellenic Mediterranean Lines and used on routes between French ports and Australia. and also on the Piraeus – Melbourne route of Hellenic Mediterranean Lines. In 1958, she was converted to a cargo ship of 7,638 GRT. She was sold to a Taiwanese buyer in 1961.

=== Union Reliance ===
Tasmania was bought by the China Union Lines of Taipei. She was renamed Union Reliance. She was used on routes between Taipei and the US. On 7 November 1961, she collided with the 9,003 GRT Norwegian tanker MV Berea in the Houston Ship Channel. As a result of the collision, Union Reliance caught fire and then ran aground. Twelve people aboard the Union Reliance were killed in the collision and subsequent fire. Union Reliance was abandoned by her owners. The wreck was removed on 9 November by the United States authorities and towed to Galveston, Texas China Union Lines refused to make payment for this, and filed a Petition for Exoneration from, or Limitation of Liability. The Court ordered that Union Reliance and her cargo be sold to pay off costs incurred by the United States authorities. On 12 January 1962, Union Reliance was sold for US$109,100 for scrap. She was scrapped at New Orleans in March 1962.

== Official Number and code letters ==
Official Numbers were a forerunner to IMO Numbers. Mormacland had the US Official Number 239370 and used the Code Letters WDSH. Empire Lagan had the UK Official Number 180557 and used the Code Letters GNCX
