= Type 40 torpedo boat =

Planned group of German ships in WWII

- Line drawing of the Type 40

Class overview
- Name: Type 40
- Operators: Kriegsmarine
- Preceded by: Type 39 torpedo boat
- Succeeded by: Type 41 torpedo boat
- Built: 1942–1944
- Planned: 24
- Completed: 0
- Canceled: 12

General characteristics
- Type: Torpedo boat / Destroyer
- Displacement: 1,931 long tons (1,962 t) (standard); 2,566 long tons (2,607 t) (deep load)
- Length: 114.5 m (375 ft 8 in) o/a
- Beam: 11.3 m (37 ft 1 in)
- Draft: 3.81 m (12 ft 6 in)
- Installed power: 3 × water-tube boilers; 49,500 shp (36,900 kW)
- Propulsion: 2 × shafts; 2 × geared steam turbine sets
- Speed: 35 knots (65 km/h; 40 mph)
- Range: 2,350 nmi (4,350 km; 2,700 mi) at 19 knots (35 km/h; 22 mph)
- Complement: 231
- Armament: 4 × single 12.7 cm (5 in) guns; 2 × twin 3.7 cm (1.5 in) AA guns; 4 × quadruple 2 cm (0.8 in) AA guns; 2 × quadruple 533 mm (21 in) torpedo tubes; 4 × depth charge launchers; 50 × mines

The Type 1940 torpedo boats were a group of 24 torpedo boats that were intended to be built for Germany's Kriegsmarine during World War II. Although classed as fleet torpedo boats (Flottentorpedoboot) by the Germans, they were comparable to contemporary large destroyers. They were designed around surplus Dutch propulsion machinery available after the Germans conquered the Netherlands in May 1940 and were to be built in Dutch shipyards. Hampered by uncooperative Dutch workers and material shortages, none of the ships were completed before the Allies invaded Normandy (Operation Neptune) in June 1944. The Germans towed the three ships that were most complete to Germany to be finished, but one was sunk en route by Allied fighter-bombers and no further work was done of the pair that did arrive successfully. The remaining ships in the Netherlands were later broken up for scrap and the two that reached Germany were scuttled in 1946.

== Background and design ==
When the Germans invaded the Netherlands on 10 May 1940, the Dutch were building four Gerard Callenburgh-class destroyers. HNLMS Isaac Sweers was towed to Britain before the Germans could reach the shipyard, the Germans finished Gerard Callenburgh as ZH1 and neither Philips van Almonde nor Tjerk Hiddes could be finished and had to be broken up. Neither ship had had their propulsion machinery installed before the invasion and the Kriegsmarine decided to design a ship using them and taking advantage of surplus capacity in Dutch shipyards and factories. Although called torpedo boats by the Kriegsmarine, the Type 40 design was larger than any previous German torpedo boat design and were effectively destroyers.

The ships had an overall length of 114.5 meters (375 ft 8 in) and were 110 meters (360 ft 11 in) long at the waterline. They had a beam of 11.3 meters (37 ft 1 in), and a maximum draft of 3.81 meters (12 ft 6 in) at deep load. The Type 40s displaced 1,931 long tons (1,962 t) at standard load and 2,566 long tons (2,607 t) at deep load. Their hulls were divided into 13 watertight compartments and they were fitted with a double bottom that covered 90% of their length. Their crew numbered 231 officers and sailors.

The Type 40-class ships had two sets of license-built Parsons geared steam turbines, each driving a single three-bladed 3.15-meter (10 ft 4 in) propeller, using steam provided by three license-built Yarrow boilers that operated at a pressure of 28 kg/cm^{2} (2,746 kPa; 398 psi) and a temperature of 380 °C (716 °F). The turbines were designed to produce a maximum of 49,500 shaft horsepower (36,900 kW) for a speed of 35 knots (65 km/h; 40 mph). The ships carried a maximum of 561 metric tons (552 long tons) of fuel oil which gave a range of 2,350 nautical miles (4,350 km; 2,700 mi) at 19 knots (35 km/h; 22 mph).

=== Armament and sensors ===
The main armament of the Type 40 class consisted four 42-caliber 12.7 cm (5.0 in) SK C/34 (Note: In Kriegsmarine gun nomenclature, SK stands for Schiffskanone (ship's gun), C/34 stands for Constructionjahr (Construction year) 1934) guns in single mounts with gun shields, two each superimposed, fore and aft of the superstructure, designated one to four from front to rear. Each mount had a range of elevation from -10° to +30° and the gun fired 28-kilogram (62 lb) projectiles at a muzzle velocity of 830 m/s (2,700 ft/s). It had a range of 17,400 meters (19,000 yd) at maximum elevation. Each gun was provided with 150 rounds. The Type 40s were equipped with a 3-meter (9 ft 10 in) rangefinder for the gunnery director atop the bridge and a 4-meter (13 ft 1 in) rangefinder was mounted just forward of No. 3 gun.

Anti-aircraft defense was provided by a pair of twin 80-caliber 3.7 cm (1.5 in) SK C/30 anti-aircraft (AA) gun mounts that were positioned on a platform abaft the funnel. The power-operated mount had a maximum elevation of 85° which gave the gun a ceiling of less than 6,800 metres (22,300 ft); horizontal range was 8,500 metres (9,300 yd) at an elevation of 35.7°. The single-shot SK C/30 fired 0.748-kilogram (1.65 lb) projectiles at a muzzle velocity of 1,000 m/s (3,300 ft/s) at a rate of 30 rounds per minute. The ships were also fitted with sixteen 2 cm (0.8 in) C/38 guns in four quadruple mounts, two on a platform between the torpedo tube mounts and a pair on the upper bridge wings. The gun had an effective rate of fire of about 120 rounds per minute. Its 0.12-kilogram (0.26 lb) projectiles were fired at a muzzle velocity of 875 m/s (2,870 ft/s) which gave it a ceiling of 3,700 meters (12,100 ft) and a maximum horizontal range of 4,800 meters (5,200 yd). Each ship carried 2,000 rounds per gun.

The Type 40s were also equipped with eight above-water 533 mm (21 in) torpedo tubes in two quadruple mounts amidships. They used the G7a torpedo which had a 300-kilogram (660 lb) warhead and three speed/range settings: 14,000 meters (15,000 yd) at 30 knots (56 km/h; 35 mph); 8,000 meters (8,700 yd) at 40 knots (74 km/h; 46 mph) and 6,000 meters (6,600 yd) at 44 knots (81 km/h; 51 mph). The ships could carry 50 mines. For anti-submarine work they were fitted with four depth charge launchers and six individual cradles for 32 depth charges.

== Construction ==
The Kriegsmarine ordered T61–T68 on 19 November 1940, although T65–T68 were only provisional orders that were finalized on 6 January 1941. A batch of four more, T69–T72, were ordered on 3 May and the final batch of twelve, T73–T84, on 27 August. The contracts for T67, T68 and T72 were transferred from Nederlandsche Scheepsbouw Maatschappij to other builders in September 1943 before construction began. The Kriegsmarine originally estimated that the first six ships would be assigned to the 3rd Destroyer Flotilla which was expected to be formed in early 1943. The destroyers probably had a lower priority for labor and materials than the large numbers of minesweepers being built in Dutch shipyards, so that the first ships were not laid down until 1942. The Dutch workers hampered construction at every turn, but shortages of brass, copper and aluminum were such that construction of all ships except for two was suspended by April 1942, even though steel and machinery for the first dozen had either been assembled or was in production. Supposedly eight ships had been begun by the end of the year; by mid-1944 the Kriegsmarine was expecting only four ships to be finished before the end of the year, another four in 1945 and the last four in 1946, the last dozen ships having been cancelled earlier.

T65 was the first of three Type 40s that the Kriegsmarine had towed to Germany for completion. She departed Vlissingen on 8 September 1944 and arrived at Borkum, a week later. The ship was in Bremen in October and was then towed to Elbing, East Prussia, in late December to be finished at the Schichau shipyard. After the yard was shut down on 22 January 1945 due to power failures, a lack of workers and the advancing Soviet forces which were approaching East Prussia, T65 was towed that day to Danzig and then back to Bremen. The incomplete ship was scuttled on 2 July 1946 after being loaded with chemical weapons. T61 was the next to leave, departing Schiedam on 12 September. Her convoy was attacked by Bristol Beaufighter fighter-bombers from 455 Squadron RAAF that same day and she was sunk off Den Helder. T63 was towed from Rotterdam in November 1944 and arrived in Emden on the 29th and the Schillig Roads on 21 December. She was towed to Elbing for further work, but was towed back to Kiel in January 1945. Much like T65, the ship was loaded with chemical munitions before she was scuttled in the Skaggerak on 31 December 1946.

== Ships ==
Construction data
Number	Builder	Laid down	Launched	Fate
T61	Wilton-Fijenoord, Schiedam	1 April 1942	15 August 1944	Sunk by aircraft while under tow, 12 September 1944
T62	Wilton-Fijenoord, Schiedam	1 April 1942	—	Demolished on the slipway, 1945–1946
T63	Rotterdamsche Droogdok Maatschappij, Rotterdam	1 July 1942	28 October 1944	Scuttled, 31 December 1946
T64	Rotterdamsche Droogdok Maatschappij, Rotterdam	1 April 1942	—	Demolished on the slipway, 1945–1946
T65	Koninklijke Maatschappij De Schelde, Vlissingen	1 December 1942	8 July 1944	Scuttled, 2 July 1946
T66	Koninklijke Maatschappij De Schelde, Vlissingen	1 December 1942	29 July 1944	Possibly destroyed in an air raid, 1944 (Note: Some Dutch sources suggest that she was never even laid down.)
T67	Koninklijke Maatschappij De Schelde, Vlissingen	23 November 1943	—	Damaged by bombing, 19 October 1944; wreck demolished November–December 1945
T68	Wilton-Fijenoord, Schiedam	—	—	Probably never laid down
T69	Wilton-Fijenoord, Schiedam	1 April 1942?	—	Possibly never laid down begun
T70	Rotterdamsche Droogdok Maatschappij, Rotterdam	1 April 1942	—	Demolished on the slipway, 1945–1946
T71	Koninklijke Maatschappij De Schelde, Vlissingen	—	—	Never laid down
T72	Rotterdamsche Droogdok Maatschappij, Rotterdam	—	—	Never laid down
T73	Wilton-Fijenoord, Schiedam	—	—	Never laid down
T74	Wilton-Fijenoord, Schiedam	—	—	Never laid down
T75	Wilton-Fijenoord, Schiedam	—	—	Never laid down
T76	Rotterdamsche Droogdok Maatschappij, Rotterdam	—	—	Never laid down
T77	Rotterdamsche Droogdok Maatschappij, Rotterdam	—	—	Never laid down
T78	Rotterdamsche Droogdok Maatschappij, Rotterdam	—	—	Never laid down
T79	Koninklijke Maatschappij De Schelde, Vlissingen	—	—	Never laid down
T80	Koninklijke Maatschappij De Schelde, Vlissingen	—	—	Never laid down
T81	Koninklijke Maatschappij De Schelde, Vlissingen	—	—	Never laid down
T82	Nederlandsche Scheepsbouw Maatschappij, Amsterdam	—	—	Never laid down
T83	Nederlandsche Scheepsbouw Maatschappij, Amsterdam	—	—	Never laid down
T84	Nederlandsche Scheepsbouw Maatschappij, Amsterdam	—	—	Never laid down
