= Marcílio Dias-class destroyer =

Three Brazilian Navy ships

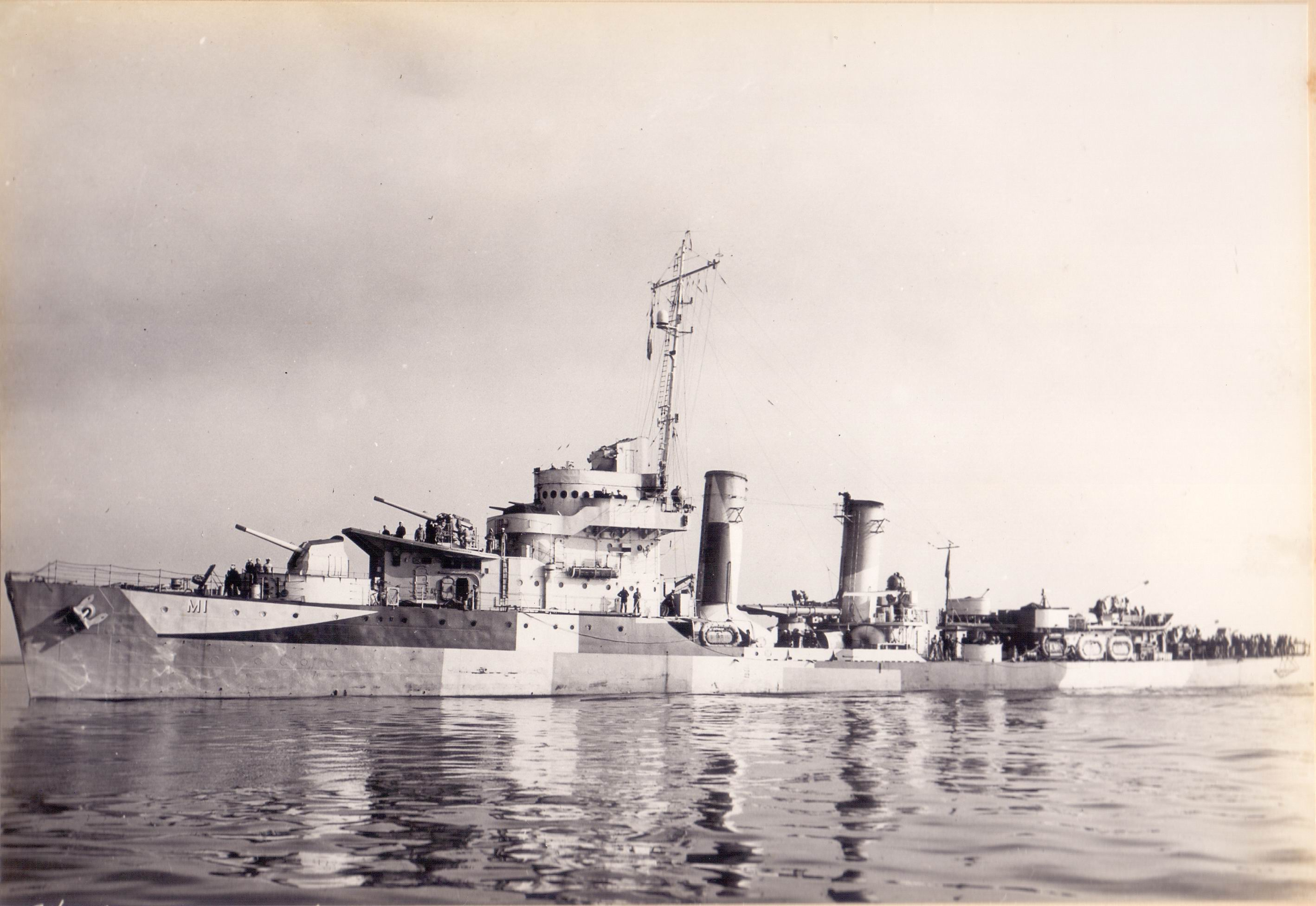
- Mariz e Barros

Class overview
- Name: Marcílio Dias class
- Builders: Ilha das Cobras, Rio de Janeiro
- Operators: Brazilian Navy
- Preceded by: Jurua class (planned); Maranhão (actual)
- Succeeded by: Acre class
- Completed: 3
- Retired: 3

General characteristics as designed
- Type: Destroyer
- Displacement: 1,524 t (1,500 long tons) standard; 2,235 t (2,200 long tons) full load
- Length: 108.81 m (357 ft 0 in) oa; 103.94 m (341 ft 0 in) pp
- Beam: 10.61 m (34 ft 10 in)
- Draught: 3.04 m (10 ft 0 in) mean
- Installed power: 4 × Babcock & Wilcox Express boilers, 42,800 shp (31,916 kW)
- Propulsion: 2-shaft General Electric Company geared turbines
- Speed: 36.5 knots (67.6 km/h; 42.0 mph)
- Range: 6,500 nmi (12,038 km; 7,480 mi) at 15 knots (28 km/h; 17 mph)
- Endurance: 559 t (550 long tons) fuel oil
- Complement: 190
- Armament: 5 × single 5 in (127 mm)/38 cal. guns; 4 × 40 mm guns; 4 × 20 mm guns; 2 × quad 21 in (533 mm) torpedo tubes; 4 × depth charge throwers

The Marcílio Dias-class destroyers (sometimes referred to as M class) were three destroyers of the Brazilian Navy that served during World War II. They were based on the United States Navy's Mahan class. They entered service in 1943 and served on Atlantic convoy duty with the Allies. In July 1944, the three destroyers escorted the Brazilian Expeditionary Force to Italy. Following the end of the war, the destroyers remained in service, undergoing modernisation. Two were discarded in 1966, with the last taken out of service in 1973.

== Design and description ==
The Marcílio Dias class was based on the United States' Mahan class, built within Brazil. They had a standard displacement of 1,524 tonnes (1,500 long tons) and were 2,235 t (2,200 long tons) at full load. They were 108.81 metres (357 ft 0 in) long overall and 103.94 metres (341 ft 0 in) between perpendiculars with a beam of 10.61 metres (34 ft 10 in) and a mean draught of 3.04 m (10 ft 0 in).

The destroyers were powered by four Babcock & Wilcox Express boilers supplying steam to General Electric Company geared turbines that drove two shafts. The engines were rated at 42,800 shaft horsepower (31,916 kW) and the vessels had a maximum speed of 36.5 knots (67.6 km/h; 42.0 mph). The Marcílio Dias class had capacity for 559 tonnes (550 long tons) of fuel oil and had a range of 6,500 nautical miles (12,038 km; 7,480 mi) at 15 knots (28 km/h; 17 mph). The destroyers had a complement of 190 officers and ratings.

The planned armament of the class was to be five 5-inch (127 mm)/38 calibre guns mounted in single turrets. This was augmented with four 40 mm guns and four 20 mm guns for anti-aircraft defence. They were also to be equipped with two quadruple 21-inch (533 mm) torpedo tube mounts. However, while under construction, one of the 5-inch guns and one of the quad mounts of torpedo tubes were removed and the number of 20 mm guns was increased to eight. Only the forward 5-inch gun was given a gun shield. For anti-submarine warfare, the destroyers were given two depth charge racks, four depth charge throwers and equipped with sonar.

In 1966 a Sea Cat missile system was fitted to Mariz e Barros, with the destroyer used as a test platform. The system was later removed and installed on the Allen M. Sumner-class destroyer Mato Grosso.

== Ships of the class ==
Marcílio Dias-class destroyers
Ship	Pennant number	Builder	Laid down	Launched	Commissioned	Fate
Marcílio Dias	M1	Ilha das Cobras, Rio de Janeiro	8 May 1937	20 July 1940	29 November 1943	Stricken 1966
Mariz e Barros	M2	Ilha das Cobras, Rio de Janeiro	1937	28 December 1940	29 November 1943	Stricken 1972
Greenhalgh	M3	Ilha das Cobras, Rio de Janeiro	1937	8 July 1941	29 November 1943	Stricken 1966

== Service history ==
The Marcílio Dias took a long time to build. After commissioning, all three vessels were assigned to Naval Forces North-East patrolling the South Atlantic. Each patrol lasted roughly fourteen days and were used primarily to intercept Axis blockade runners. The patrols sometimes worked in concert with United States Navy forces. The destroyers also saw convoy escort duty between Rio de Janeiro, Recife and Trinidad and in July 1944, escorted the five convoys that carried the Brazilian Expeditionary Force to Italy.

== Sources ==
- Scheina, Robert L. (1980). "Brazil". In Chesneau, Roger (ed.). Conway's All the World's Fighting Ships 1922–1946. Conway Maritime Press. pp. 416–418. ISBN 0-85177-146-7.
- Scheina, Robert L. & Smigielski, Adam (1995). "Brazil". In Chumbley, Stephen (ed.). Conway's All the World's Fighting Ships, 1947–1995 (revised ed.). Naval Institute Press. pp. 29–36. ISBN 1-55750-132-7.
- Whitley, M. J. (2000) [1988]. Destroyers of World War Two: An International Encyclopedia. Naval Institute Press. ISBN 0-87021-326-1.
