= Pará-class destroyer (1959) =

Class of destroyers of the Brazilian Navy

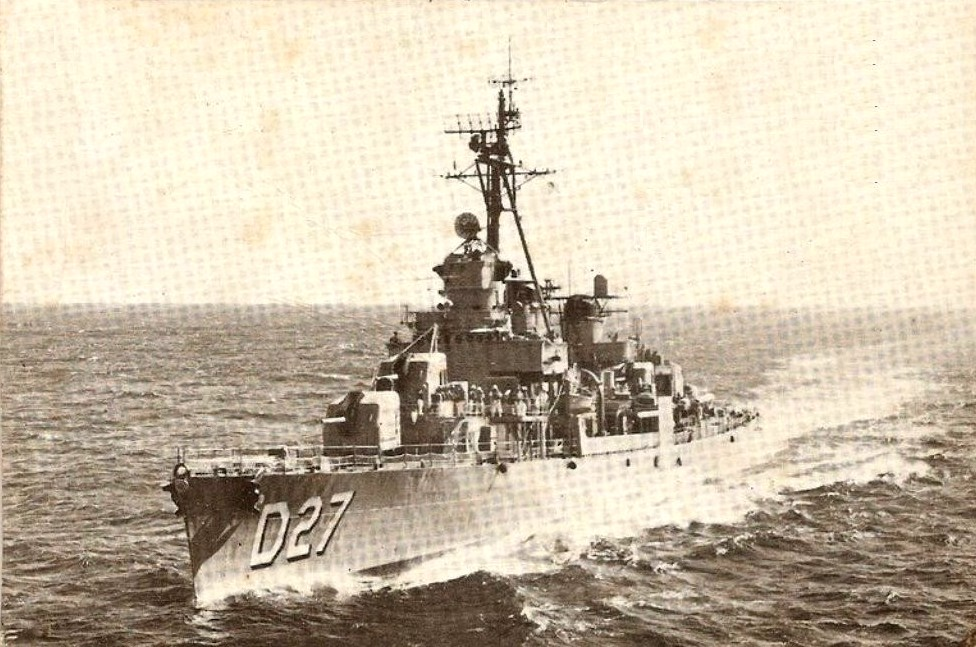
- Pará

Class overview
- Name: Pará class
- Builders: Seattle-Tacoma Shipbuilding Corporation; Federal Shipbuilding and Drydock Company; Boston Navy Yard; Bethlehem Steel; Bethlehem Shipbuilding San Pedro; Puget Sound Naval Shipyard
- Operators: Brazilian Navy
- Preceded by: Acre class
- Succeeded by: Mato Grosso class
- Built: 1941–1945
- In commission: 1959–1990
- Completed: 7
- Retired: 7

General characteristics
- Type: Destroyer
- Displacement: 2,050 long tons (2,083 t)
- Length: 376 ft 6 in (114.76 m)
- Beam: 39 ft 8 in (12.09 m)
- Draft: 13 ft 9 in (4.19 m)
- Propulsion: 60,000 shp (45,000 kW); 2 × propellers
- Speed: 35 knots (65 km/h; 40 mph)
- Range: 6,500 nmi (12,000 km; 7,500 mi) at 15 knots (28 km/h; 17 mph)
- Complement: 300
- Sensors & processing systems: AN/SPS-6 air-search radar; AN/SPS-10 surface-search radar; Mark 25 fire-control system
- Armament: D27-29 and D31-33: 4 × single 5 in (127 mm)/38 guns; 2 × dual 3"/50 cal guns (D28-29 and 31-32); 1 × twin Bofors 40 mm guns (D28-29 and 31-32); 3 × twin Bofors 40 mm guns (D27); 2 × single Oerlikon 20 mm guns (D28-29 and 31-32); 1 × quin Mark 15 torpedo tubes (D27-29 and 31-32); 2 × triple Mark 32 torpedo tubes (D31-33); 2 × Hedgehog anti-submarine mortar; 1 × Depth charge tracks; D30: 4 × single 5 in (127 mm)/38 guns; 3 × twin 3"/50 cal guns; 2 × single Oerlikon 20 mm guns; 1 × quin Mark 15 torpedo tubes; 2 × Hedgehog anti-submarine mortar; 1 × Depth charge tracks

The Pará-class destroyer is a class of destroyers of the Brazilian Navy. Seven ships of the Fletcher class were lent by the United States Navy and were in commission from 1959 until 1990.

== Development ==
Parâ was commissioned as USS Guest on 15 December 1942, Paraíba was commissioned as USS Bennett on 9 February 1943, Paraná was commissioned as USS Cushing on 17 January 1944, Pernambuco was commissioned as USS Hailey on 30 September 1943, Piauí was commissioned as USS Lewis Hancock on 30 September 1943, Santa Catarina was commissioned as USS Irwin on 30 September 1943 and Maranhao was commissioned as USS Shields on 8 February 1945.

After World War II, they were in a mothball state, but were later handed over to Brazil based on the Brazil-US Ship Loan Agreement. The ships took part in the Lobster War, in the 1960s, while escorting the aircraft carrier Minas Gerais. All 7 ships were delivered in batches of 2 at a time, thus the ships having different armaments and configurations.

== Ships in the class ==
Pará class							
Hull no.	Name	Builder	Laid down	Launched	Acquired	Decommissioned	Fate
D27	Pará	Boston Navy Yard	27 September 1941	20 February 1942	5 June 1959	1978	Sunk as target, 1983
D28	Paraíba	Boston Navy Yard	10 December 1941	16 April 1942	15 December 1959	1978	Scrapped, 1978
D29	Paraná	Bethlehem Steel	3 May 1943	30 September 1943	20 July 1961	1 August 1973	Scrapped, 1982
D30	Pernambuco	Seattle-Tacoma Shipbuilding Corporation	11 April 1942	9 March 1943	20 July 1961	1982	Sunk as target, 1982
D31	Piauí	Federal Shipbuilding and Drydock Company	31 March 1943	1 August 1943	1 August 1967	1989	Scrapped, 1989
D32	Santa Catarina	Bethlehem Shipbuilding San Pedro	2 May 1943	31 October 1943	10 May 1968	28 December 1988	Sunk as target, 1990
D33	Maranhao	Puget Sound Naval Shipyard	10 August 1943	25 September 1944	1 July 1972	1990	Scrapped, 1990

== See also ==
- List of historical ships of the Brazilian Navy

== Bibliography ==
- Gardiner, Robert; Chumbley, Stephen; Budzbon, Przemysław (1995). Conway's All the World's Fighting Ships 1947-1995. Annapolis, Md.: Naval Institute Press. ISBN 1-55750-132-7. OCLC 34267261.
- "Shields (DD-596)". Dictionary of American Naval Fighting Ships. Navy Department, Naval History and Heritage Command. 4 April 2015.
