= Type 41 torpedo boat =

Nazi Germany's Kriegsmarine's torpedo boats

Class overview
- Name: Type 41
- Builders: Schichau, Elbing
- Operators: Kriegsmarine
- Preceded by: Type 40 torpedo boat
- Succeeded by: Type 44 torpedo boat
- Built: 1943–1945
- Planned: 15
- Completed: 0
- Canceled: 1

General characteristics
- Type: Torpedo boat
- Displacement: 1,493 long tons (1,517 t) (standard); 2,155 long tons (2,190 t) (deep load)
- Length: 106 m (347 ft 9 in) o/a
- Beam: 10.7 m (35 ft 1 in)
- Draft: 3.72 m (12 ft 2 in)
- Installed power: 4 × water-tube boilers; 40,000 shp (30,000 kW)
- Propulsion: 2 × shafts; 2 × geared steam turbine sets
- Speed: 34 knots (63 km/h; 39 mph)
- Range: 2,800 nmi (5,200 km; 3,200 mi) at 19 knots (35 km/h; 22 mph)
- Complement: 210
- Sensors & processing systems: S-Gërat sonar; FuMO 21 radar
- Armament: 4 × single 10.5 cm (4.1 in) guns; 3 × twin 3.7 cm (1.5 in) AA guns; 1 × quadruple, 2 × twin 2 cm (0.8 in) AA guns; 2 × triple 533 mm (21 in) torpedo tubes; 4 × depth charge launchers

The Type 1941 torpedo boats were a group of 15 torpedo boats that were built for Nazi Germany's Kriegsmarine during World War II. Ordered in late 1942, none of the ships were finished before the German surrender on 8/9 May 1945, although four of the ships had been towed west to be completed earlier in that year. They were all either scuttled or demolished in the shipyard in 1945–1946.

== Background and design ==
The start of World War II in September 1939 caused the cancellation of most of the planned Type 39 torpedo boats and only 15 ships were ordered. Shortages of labor and materials seriously hampered their construction so that the Kriegsmarine did not consider improvements until 1941. It decided upon a slightly enlarged version of the Type 39 with more powerful propulsion machinery to give the ships a speed of 34 knots (63 km/h; 39 mph) and space for an additional twin-gun 3.7-centimeter (1.5 in) anti-aircraft mount.

The ships had an overall length of 106 meters (347 ft 9 in) and were 102 meters (334 ft 8 in) long at the waterline. They had a beam of 10.7 meters (35 ft 1 in), and a maximum draft of 3.72 meters (12 ft 2 in) at deep load. The Type 41s displaced 1,493 long tons (1,517 t) at standard load and 2,155 long tons (2,190 t) at deep load. Their hull was divided into 13 watertight compartments and it was fitted with a double bottom that covered 69% of their length. Their crew numbered 210 officers and sailors.

The Type 41 ships had two sets of Wagner geared steam turbines, each driving a single three-bladed 2.65-meter (8 ft 8 in) propeller, using steam provided by four Wagner water-tube boilers that operated at a pressure of 70 kg/cm^{2} (6,865 kPa; 996 psi) and a temperature of 460 °C (860 °F). The turbines were designed to produce 40,000 shaft horsepower (30,000 kW) for a speed of 34 knots. The ships carried a maximum of 559 metric tons (550 long tons) of fuel oil which gave a range of 2,800 nautical miles (5,200 km; 3,200 mi) at 19 knots (35 km/h; 22 mph).

=== Armament and sensors ===
The main armament of the Type 41 class consisted four 42-caliber 10.5 cm (4.1 in) SK C/32 (Note: In Kriegsmarine gun nomenclature, SK stands for Schiffskanone (ship's gun), C/32 stands for Constructionjahr (Construction year) 1932) guns in single mounts; one forward of the superstructure, one between the funnels, and two aft, one superfiring over the other. Its mount had a range of elevation from -10° to +70° and the gun fired 15.1-kilogram (33 lb) projectiles at a muzzle velocity of 785 m/s (2,580 ft/s). It had a range of 15,175 meters (16,596 yd) at an elevation of +44.4°.

Anti-aircraft defense was provided by three twin 80-caliber 3.7 cm (1.5 in) SK C/30 anti-aircraft (AA) gun mounts; two of these positioned on a platform abaft the rear funnel and another was in front of the bridge. The power-operated mount had a maximum elevation of 85° which gave the gun a ceiling of less than 6,800 meters (22,300 ft); horizontal range was 8,500 meters (9,300 yd) at an elevation of 35.7°. The single-shot SK C/30 fired 0.748-kilogram (1.65 lb) projectiles at a muzzle velocity of 1,000 m/s (3,300 ft/s) at a rate of 30 rounds per minute. The ships were also fitted with eight 2 cm (0.8 in) C/38 guns in one quadruple mount on the aft superstructure and a pair of twin mounts on the bridge wings. The gun had an effective rate of fire of about 120 rounds per minute. Its 0.12-kilogram (0.26 lb) projectiles were fired at a muzzle velocity of 875 m/s (2,870 ft/s) which gave it a ceiling of 3,700 meters (12,100 ft) and a maximum horizontal range of 4,800 meters (5,200 yd). Each ship carried 2,000 rounds per gun.

The Type 41s were also equipped with six above-water 533 mm (21 in) torpedo tubes in two triple mounts amidships. They used the G7a torpedo which had a 300-kilogram (660 lb) warhead and three speed/range settings: 14,000 meters (15,000 yd) at 30 knots (56 km/h; 35 mph); 8,000 meters (8,700 yd) at 40 knots (74 km/h; 46 mph) and 6,000 meters (6,600 yd) at 44 knots (81 km/h; 51 mph). For anti-submarine work the ships were fitted with four depth charge launchers and six individual cradles for 32 depth charges. They probably would have been equipped with the same electronics suite as the late Type 39s: a S-Gërat sonar, a FuMO 21 (Note: Funkmess-Ortung (Radio-direction finder, active ranging)) radar and FuMB7 (Note: Funkmess-Beobachtung (Passive radio-direction finder)) "Naxos" and FuMB8 "Wanz G" radar detectors.

The ships of the second and third batches would have been fitted with a high-angle fire-control system to give their main battery an anti-aircraft capability. They also would have received fully automatic 3.7 cm Flak M42 guns in lieu of the semi-automatic SK C/30 weapons of the earlier ships.

== Construction ==
The Kriegsmarine ordered T37–T42 from Schichau on 25 November 1942, although their turbines had been ordered in August 1941. A batch of six more, T43–T48, were ordered on 12 June 1943 and the final batch of four, T49–T51, on 11 January 1944. All were built at the company's shipyard in Elbing, East Prussia, (now Elbląg). T51 was cancelled before construction began. The Kriegsmarine originally estimated that T37 would be completed by the beginning of 1945, but labor shortages and other problems delayed the ships by two to three months. All work ceased at the shipyard on 22 January due to power failures, a lack of workers and the advancing Soviet forces which were approaching East Prussia.

T37, T38 and T39 were towed from Elbing around 23 January for completion at shipyards further west. T37 was intended to be finished at the Deschimag yard in Bremen, but was found in Bremerhaven by American troops at the end of the war with no further work having been done. T38 and T39 were towed to Kiel at the same time as T37; the former was also intended to go to Deschimag. No further work was done on either ship. T40 was towed west on 9 March, bound for Eckernförde with a cargo of a dozen Linsen explosive motorboats aboard, but ran aground at Brösen, Danzig, on the 12th. She was partially salvaged, but was scuttled shortly afterwards.

== Ships ==
Construction data
Number	Laid down	Launched	Completion percentage	Fate
T37	Between 26 July and 10 October 1943	Between 19 February and 19 April 1944	96.5%	Scuttled by the United States Navy, 1946
T38	11 October 1943	Between 19 April and 19 June 1944	84%	Scuttled by the Royal Navy, 10 May 1946
T39	Between 10 October 1943 and 19 February 1944	Between 19 April and 19 June 1944	76%	Scuttled by the Royal Navy, 10 May 1946
T40	Between 10 October 1943 and 19 February 1944	Between 7 August and 25 October 1944	70%	Accidentally ran aground, 12 March 1945, and later scuttled
T41	Between 10 October 1943 and 19 February 1944	—N/a	66.5%	Demolished on the slipway, March 1945
T42	Between 10 October 1943 and 19 February 1944	—N/a	58.5%	Demolished on the slipway, March 1945
T43	Between 19 February and 19 June 1944	—N/a	48%	Demolished on the slipway, March 1945
T44	Between 19 February and 19 June 1944	—N/a	40%	Demolished on the slipway, March 1945
T45	Between 19 February and 19 June 1944	—N/a	35%	Demolished on the slipway, March 1945
T46	Unknown	—N/a	26%	Demolished on the slipway, March 1945
T47	Unknown	—N/a	23%	Demolished on the slipway, March 1945
T48	Unknown	—N/a	20.5%	Demolished on the slipway, March 1945
T49	Unknown	—N/a	8.2%	Demolished on the slipway, March 1945
T50	Unknown	—N/a	5.3%	Demolished on the slipway, March 1945
