= USS Hailey =

Fletcher-class destroyer

Coordinates: 22.8712975°S 43.1334920°W

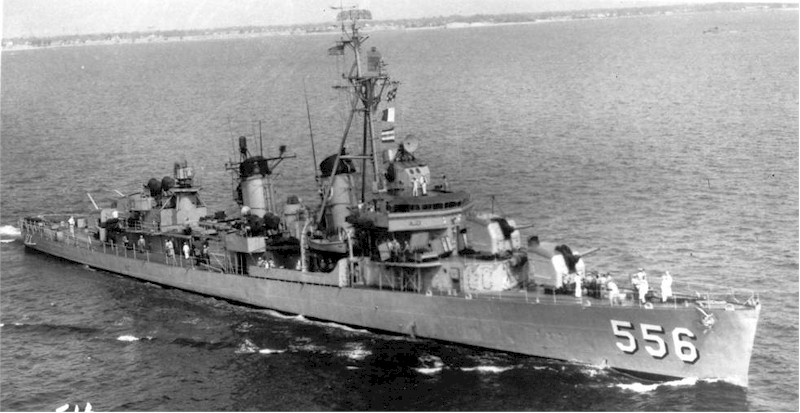
- USS Hailey (DD-556)

History

United States
- Name: Hailey
- Namesake: Joshua Hailey
- Builder: Seattle-Tacoma Shipbuilding Corporation
- Laid down: 11 April 1942
- Launched: 9 March 1943
- Commissioned: 30 September 1943
- Decommissioned: 3 November 1960
- Stricken: 1 August 1973
- Identification: Hull number: DD-556
- Fate: Loaned to Brazil, 20 July 1961

Brazil
- Name: Pernambuco
- Acquired: 20 July 1961
- Identification: D-30
- Fate: Sunk as a target c. 1982

General characteristics
- Class & type: Fletcher-class destroyer
- Displacement: 2,050 tons
- Length: 376 ft 6 in (114.76 m)
- Beam: 39 ft 8 in (12.09 m)
- Draft: 17 ft 9 in (5.41 m)
- Propulsion: 60,000 shp (45,000 kW); 2 propellers
- Speed: 35 knots (65 km/h; 40 mph)
- Range: 6,500 nmi (12,000 km; 7,500 mi) at 15 knots (28 km/h; 17 mph)
- Complement: 273
- Armament: 5 × single Mk 12 5 in (127 mm)/38 guns; 5 × twin 40 mm (1.6 in) Bofors AA guns; 7 × single 20 mm (0.8 in) Oerlikon AA guns; 2 × quintuple 21 in (533 mm) torpedo tubes; 6 × single depth charge throwers; 2 × depth charge racks

USS Hailey (DD-556) was a Fletcher-class destroyer of the United States Navy.

== Namesake ==
Joshua Hailey was an American privateer during the War of 1812. He was placed in command of the privateer True Blooded Yankee in early 1813. The privateer, built in France by Rhode Island men, sailed from Brest, France on 1 March 1813 to prey on commerce in the Irish Sea. On one occasion Hailey seized an island near the British mainland and held it for 6 days while making repairs. In a 37-day cruise he took 270 prisoners and captured valuable cargoes. Sailing from France on his second cruise, Hailey made a rapid circuit of Ireland and Scotland, landing several times and holding small coastal towns for ransom. During one night he burned seven vessels in an Irish port. In May he ran into Dublin Harbour to sink a schooner that had eluded him on the previous day. Hailey sailed again 21 September for his third cruise, setting his course for the English Channel. He captured and manned so many prizes that when finally captured the True Blood Yankee had only 32 men left of its original crew of 200. During its three cruises the ship had captured six ships and 21 smaller vessels.

HMS Albacore in December 1814 chased True-Blooded Yankee into St Salvador, where Albacore kept it closely blockaded until True-Blooded Yankee was sold to defray the expenses of its stay. Later True-Blooded Yankee was reported to be fitting out there under the Patriot flag, to cruise against the Spanish Royalists.

== Construction and commissioning ==
Hailey was launched 9 March 1943 by Seattle-Tacoma Shipbuilding Corp., Seattle, Washington, sponsored by Mrs. Claude S. Gillette, wife of Rear Admiral Gillette; and commissioned 30 September 1943.

== History ==
After shakedown out of San Diego, Hailey departed Seattle 13 December 1943 to join the Pacific Fleet at Pearl Harbor. She sortied from Pearl Harbor 19 January 1944 screening a unit of Admiral Richmond Kelly Turner's Southern Attack Force for the assault and occupation of the Marshall Islands. Arriving off the southern tip of Kwajalein Atoll, Hailey joined the Southern Transport Screen and later stood offshore and pounded the enemy with her 5-inch guns. She sailed from Kwajalein 15 February with the Eniwetok Expeditionary Group and arrived off Eniwetok next day to screen the heavy ships; then joined Admiral Jesse Oldendorf's Northern Support Group in battering strong enemy emplacements before retiring to Majuro Atoll screening Manila Hay.

After patrolling the Mussau-Emirau area, Hailey spent most of April and May on antisubmarine patrol, intercepting barge traffic and providing daily fire support for Army operations in the New Guinea area. Destroyer Division 94, consisting of Haggard, Franks, Hailey, and Johnston was moving northwesterly up from the Solomons on 16 May. About 2½ hours before midnight they were steaming in scouting line some 125 miles (201 km) east by north of Green Island. Haggard made a sonar contact on her starboard bow at a range of 2,800 yards (2,600 m). It was the 1,600-ton Japanese submarine I-176. Five separate attacks were made and between the last two a heavy underwater ripple explosion was heard. The destroyers continued their search until the following evening without regaining contact—but they recovered souvenirs of Japanese origin from a diesel oil slick that extended over 7 miles (11 km) of ocean.

During the first part of June Hailey took up screening and patrol duties east of Saipan in support of the Marianas operations. She sortied from Eniwetok 1 July with Admiral Weyler's Battleship Division 3 for the pre-invasion bombardment and softening up of Guam, then joined Admiral Conolly's Southern Attack Force for the capture of Guam (21 July–10 August 1944) retiring to Eniwetok 9 August. The remainder of August and September Hailey screened a group of escort carriers furnishing air support for the seizure and occupation of Peleliu, Ngesebu, and Anguar Islands in the Palaus.

Hailey next sortied from Seeadler Harbor, Manus Island, 12 October with Admiral Felix Stump's "Taffy 2" (Task Unit 77.4.2) the center formation of the three escort carrier groups off the entrance to Leyte Gulf. While Admiral Oldendorf was crushing Admiral Nishumura's Southern Force in Surigao Strait 24–25 October, Admiral Takeo Kurita's Center Force arrived off Samar undetected in the early hours of 25 October with the aim of destroying the 7th Fleet's heavy concentration of amphibious ships supporting the invasion of Leyte. In the face of overwhelming odds against a much superior force Admiral Thomas L. Sprague's three "Taffies" gallantly drove off Kurita's forces and defeated his mission—thus stopping the most powerful surface fleet Japan had sent to sea since the Battle of Midway.

The experienced destroyer next joined the Fast Carrier Task Force (then TF 38 of Admiral William F. Halsey's 3rd Fleet), as a unit of Rear Admiral Gerald F. Bogan's Task Group 38.4 (TG 38.4) launching strikes on Formosa, before joining Captain Acuff's fueling group for the 3d Fleet. In February 1945 Hailey joined Admiral Marc A. Mitscher's Fast Carrier Task Force 58 and until the last of June participated in bombardments and strikes, inflicting much damage to the enemy on Okinawa and the Japanese home islands where "the fleet had come to stay."

Returning to the States in July, Hailey decommissioned at San Diego 27 January 1946 and joined the Reserve Fleet.

Hailey recommissioned at San Diego 27 April 1951. After training in the San Diego area she transited the Panama Canal and joined units of the 6th Fleet at Newport for duty. Hailey departed Newport on 6 September 1952 and sailed via the Panama Canal Zone to spend the next four months in Korean waters. Joining Fast Carrier Task Force 77 (TF 77), she took part in blockading operations and provided close fire support for ground troops in Korea. Departing Sasebo 5 February 1953, Hailey returned to the East Coast once more to rejoin the 6th Fleet.

Between 8 September 1954 and 14 September 1959 Hailey made four deployments with the 6th Fleet to the Mediterranean. When not deployed in the Mediterranean, she served as plane guard for the aircraft carrier Monterey, training aviation cadets at Pensacola. In addition, she was continuously engaged in antisubmarine training and destroyer tactics. Hailey decommissioned 3 November 1960 at Portsmouth, Virginia, and joined the Reserve Fleet. Hailey received six battle stars for World War II service and two stars for Korean War service.

== Brazilian service ==
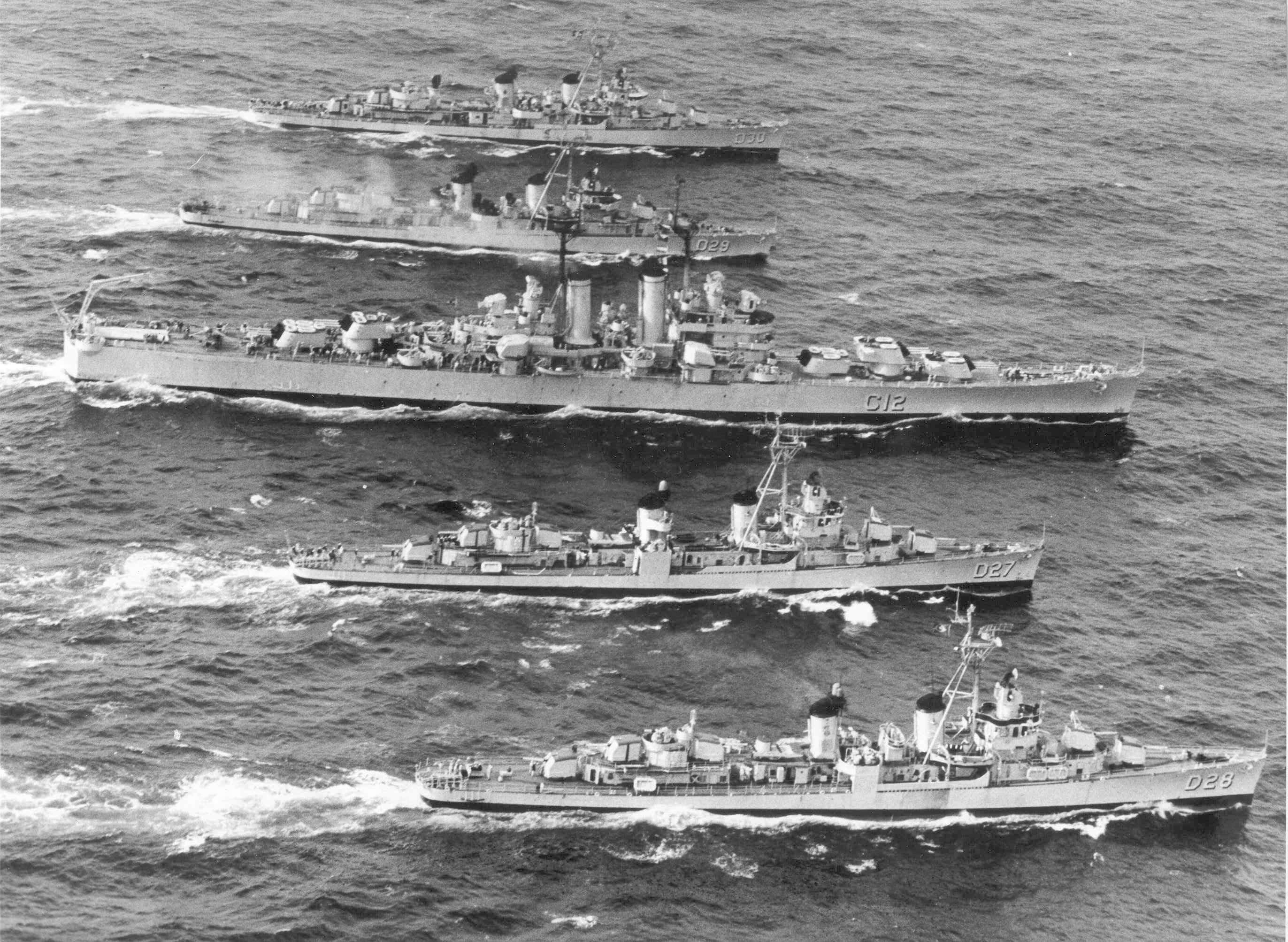
The Brazilian Pernambuco (D30), top, during the 1961 Lobster War.

Hailey was loaned to the government of Brazil 20 July 1961, and served in the Marinha do Brasil as Pernambuco (D-30). She was finally sunk as a target, circa in 1982.

One of the ship's 5-inch gun on display at Rio de Janeiro Naval Base.
