= List of United States Navy ships commemorating the Confederate States of America =

The table below is a list of United States Navy ships named after persons and places commemorating the Confederate States of America. The US Navy has named at least 26 ships after persons, who fought voluntarily with the Confederacy against the United States of America or after a victorious battle for the Confederacy. Currently two active ships exist which fell under this category – USS Chancellorsville (CG-62) and USNS Maury (T-AGS-66) – until their renaming in March 2023.

With the enactment of the National Defense Authorization Act for Fiscal Year 2021 in January 2021, the Naming Commission was tasked by Congress to develop plans to "remove all names, symbols, displays, monuments, and paraphernalia that honor or commemorate the Confederate States of America or any person who served voluntarily with the Confederate States of America from all assets of the Department of Defense." In September 2022 the Naming Commission recommended to rename the cruiser USS Chancellorsville (CG-62) and oceanographic survey ship USNS Maury (T-AGS-66), with the new names to be decided by the Secretary of the Navy. In March 2023 Chancellorsville was renamed USS Robert Smalls (CG-62) and Maury was renamed USNS Marie Tharp (T-AGS-66), removing all remaining ship names which commemorated the Confederate States of America.

== US Navy Ships commemorating the Confederate States of America ==
US Navy Ships named after persons and places of the Confederate States of America
Namesake	Ships (active = bold)	Commissioned / In service	Decommissioned / Out of service	Remarks
John Mercer Brooke (Confederate marine engineer)	USS Brooke (FFG-1) (guided-missile frigate)	12 March 1966	16 September 1988	
Franklin Buchanan (Confederate admiral)	USS Buchanan (DD-131) (destroyer)	20 January 1919	9 September 1940	
Franklin Buchanan (Confederate admiral)	USS Buchanan (DD-484) (destroyer)	21 March 1942	28 April 1948	
Franklin Buchanan (Confederate admiral)	USS Buchanan (DDG-14) (guided-missile destroyer)	7 February 1962	1 October 1991	
Battle of Chancellorsville (Confederate victory)	USS Chancellorsville (CG-62) (guided-missile cruiser)	4 November 1989	active	Renamed USS Robert Smalls on 1 March 2023, to be decommissioned 2026.
George E. Dixon (Confederate submarine commander)	USS Dixon (AS-37) (submarine tender)	7 August 1971	15 December 1995	
Fort Fisher (Confederate fort) / Charles Frederick Fisher (Confederate officer)	USS Fort Fisher (LSD-40) (dock landing ship)	9 December 1972	27 February 1998	
Horace Lawson Hunley (Confederate marine engineer)	USS Hunley (AS-31) (submarine tender)	16 June 1962	30 September 1994	
Duncan Ingraham (Confederate naval officer)	USS Ingraham (DD-111) (destroyer)	15 May 1919	29 June 1922	
Duncan Ingraham (Confederate naval officer)	USS Ingraham (DD-444) (destroyer)	19 July 1941	22 August 1942	Sunk
Duncan Ingraham (Confederate naval officer)	USS Ingraham (DD-694) (destroyer)	10 March 1944	15 June 1971	
Duncan Ingraham (Confederate naval officer)	USS Ingraham (FFG-61) (guided-missile frigate)	5 August 1989	30 January 2015	
William Francis Lynch (Confederate naval officer)	USNS Lynch (T-AGOR-7) (oceanographic research ship)	1965	23 December 1994	
Matthew Fontaine Maury (Confederate naval officer and oceanographer)	USS Commodore Maury (SP-656) (auxiliary ship)	April 1917	26 October 1918	Former civilian name retained.
Matthew Fontaine Maury (Confederate naval officer and oceanographer)	USS Maury (DD-100) (destroyer)	23 September 1918	19 March 1930	
Matthew Fontaine Maury (Confederate naval officer and oceanographer)	USS Maury (DD-401) (destroyer)	5 August 1938	19 October 1945	
Matthew Fontaine Maury (Confederate naval officer and oceanographer)	USS Maury (AGS-16) (survey ship)	12 July 1946	19 December 1969	
Matthew Fontaine Maury (Confederate naval officer and oceanographer)	USNS Maury (T-AGS-39) (survey ship)	31 March 1989	September 1994	
Matthew Fontaine Maury (Confederate naval officer and oceanographer)	USNS Maury (T-AGS-66) (survey ship)	February 2016	active	Renamed USNS Marie Tharp on 8 March 2023.
Richard Lucian Page (Confederate naval officer)	USS Richard L. Page (FFG-5) (guided-missile frigate)	5 August 1967	30 September 1988	
Robert E. Lee (Confederate general)	USS Robert E. Lee (SSBN-601) (ballistic missile submarine)	15 September 1960	1 December 1983	
Raphael Semmes (Confederate naval officer)	USS Semmes (DD-189) (destroyer)	21 February 1920	2 June 1946	
Raphael Semmes (Confederate naval officer)	USS Semmes (DDG-18) (guided-missile destroyer)	30 November 1962	14 April 1991	
Stonewall Jackson (Confederate general)	USS Stonewall (1863) (tender, blockade runner)	February 1863	May 1865	Captured, former confederate name retained.
Stonewall Jackson (Confederate general)	USS Stonewall (IX-185) (tanker)	18 September 1944	17 January 1946	
Stonewall Jackson (Confederate general)	USS Stonewall Jackson (SSBN-634) (ballistic missile submarine)	28 August 1964	9 February 1995	
Josiah Tattnall III (Confederate naval officer)	USS Tattnall (DD-125) (destroyer)	26 June 1919	17 December 1945	
Josiah Tattnall III (Confederate naval officer)	USS Tattnall (DDG-19) (guided-missile destroyer)	13 April 1963	18 January 1991	
James Iredell Waddell (Confederate naval officer)	USS Waddell (DDG-24) (guided-missile destroyer)	28 August 1964	1 October 1992	

== See also ==
- United States ship naming conventions
