= USS Ingraham =

Four ships of the United States Navy have borne the name USS Ingraham, named in honor of Captain Duncan Ingraham

- USS Ingraham (DD-111), was a Wickes-class destroyer, launched in 1918 and struck in 1936
- USS Ingraham (DD-444), was a Gleaves-class destroyer, launched in 1941 but sank after a collision in 1942
- USS Ingraham (DD-694), was an Allen M. Sumner-class destroyer, launched in 1944 and transferred to Greece in 1971
- USS Ingraham (FFG-61), was an Oliver Hazard Perry-class frigate, launched in 1988 and decommissioned in 2014
