= SS Letitia =

Ship, built 1924

- The ship as Captain Cook

History

United Kingdom
- Name: Letitia (1924–39); HMS Letitia (1939–44); HMHS Letitia (1944–46); Empire Brent (1946–52); Captain Cook (1952–60)
- Owner: Anchor-Donaldson Line (1925–36); Donaldson-Atlantic Line (1936–46); Ministry of Transport (1946–59); Government of New Zealand (1959–60)
- Operator: Cunard Line and Anchor-Donaldson (1925–36); Donaldson-Atlantic Line (1936–46); Donaldson Bros & Black (1946–60)
- Port of registry: (United Kingdom) Glasgow (1925–39); Royal Navy (1939–46); (United Kingdom) Glasgow (1946–60)
- Builder: Fairfield SB and Eng Co, Govan
- Yard number: 601
- Launched: 14 October 1924
- Completed: April 1925
- Identification: UK official number 148847; code letters KSLT (until 1933); Call sign GLBX (1934–39); pennant number F16 (1939–44)
- Fate: Scrapped in 1960

General characteristics
- Tonnage: 13,475 gross register tons (GRT); tonnage under deck 10,217; 8,161 NRT
- Length: 525.7 ft (160.2 m) p/p; 538 ft (164 m) o/a
- Beam: 66.4 ft (20.2 m)
- Depth: 29.5 ft (9.0 m)
- Installed power: 9,000 SHP
- Propulsion: 6 × DR geared turbines by Brown-Curtis-Fairfield; twin screw; 3 double- & 2 single-ended forced draught boilers supplying steam at max pressure 210 lb_{f}/in^{2}
- Speed: 15 knots (28 km/h) (service); 16 knots (30 km/h) (max)
- Capacity: (As built); 516 cabin class; 1,000 third class; (After 1927); 298 cabin class; 310 tourist class; 964 third class; (As hospital ship); 1,000 patients; (As 1949 emigration ship); 965 emigrants; (As 1951 emigration ship); 1,088 passengers in two, four, and six berth cabins
- Armament: As an armed merchant cruiser: 8 × 6-inch (150 mm) guns; 2 × 3-inch (76 mm) guns

SS Letitia was an ocean liner built in Scotland for service with the Anchor-Donaldson Line. She continued to serve with its successor company Donaldson Atlantic Line. At the start of the Second World War in September 1939, the British Admiralty requisitioned the ship for service and had it converted to serve as an armed merchant cruiser. She was withdrawn from this service in 1941 to become a troop ship.

Badly damaged in 1943, after being repaired the Letitia was used as a hospital ship in Canada. She was returned to civilian service in 1946 after the end of the war. She was bought by the Ministry of Transport, which renamed her as Empire Brent and assigned Donaldson Brothers and Black to manage her. She sailed on a number of voyages, at times carrying troops to the Far East, as well as being an emigration ship to Australia. She was briefly laid up in 1950. She was returned to service under charter to the Government of New Zealand as Captain Cook. She was withdrawn from service in 1960 and sold for scrap.

== Career ==
=== Pre-war service ===
The Fairfield Shipbuilding and Engineering Company of Govan built Letitia, launching her on 14 October 1924 and completing her in April 1925. She initially sailed for the Glasgow-based Anchor-Donaldson Ltd, on their summer route between Liverpool, Quebec and Montreal with another Anchor-Donaldson steamer Athenia. In winter she sailed to Halifax and St John's, Newfoundland. Her maiden voyage was from Glasgow to Montreal on 24 April 1925. This was a joint venture between Cunard Line and Anchor-Donaldson Line. She underwent a refit in 1927, and with the reforming of the company into the Donaldson Atlantic Line in 1935, Letitia was one of the assets retained.

Letitia ran aground twice in 1935. The first time was on 11 April at Cape Pappas, Patras, Greece, where she was refloated on 13 April. The second was on 16 August on the South Briggs Reef at the entrance to Belfast Lough. The passengers were disembarked, and on 20 August she was refloated.

== Second World War ==
The Admiralty requisitioned Letitia on 9 September 1939, shortly after the outbreak of the Second World War. She was refitted to arm her with eight 6-inch (150 mm) and two 3-inch (76 mm) guns, and entered Royal Navy service on 6 November 1939 with the pennant number F16.

She spent most of her time in the Atlantic; initially between October 1939 and January 1940 deploying with the Halifax Escort Force. On 6 January 1940, Convoy HX 15 left Halifax, Nova Scotia, arriving at Liverpool on 19 January. Letitia was an escort for the convoy. Most of 1940 was spent with the Northern Patrol, followed by the period of November 1940 to February 1941 with the Northern and Western Patrol. On 13 January 1941, Letitia ran aground at Halifax, Nova Scotia and was badly damaged. She was briefly with the Bermuda and Halifax Escort Force, before returning to the North Atlantic Escort Force between May and June 1941. By now however it had become clear to the Admiralty that using liners such as Letitia as armed merchant cruisers left them too exposed to attack, without offering substantially increased protection. The remaining merchant cruisers were withdrawn from service, Letitia being withdrawn on 7 June 1941, and were instead used as troop ships by the Ministry of War Transport.

On 10 January 1942 part of Convoy WS 15 sailed from Liverpool, with another part sailing from the Clyde on 11 January. The two parts combined off Orsay on 12 January. Letitia was with the Liverpool part and was destined for Durban. On 29 March 1942 Letitia arrived at Glasgow from Cape Town. On 22 August 1942, Convoy AT 20 sailed from Halifax, Nova Scotia During the evening of 22 August, Letitia failed to react to an order to perform an emergency zig-zag and USS Buck was sent to correct Letitia's actions. This set in motion a chain of events that led to a collision between USS Ingraham and USS Chemung, which sank Ingraham. There was a further collision between HMT Awatea and USS Buck. In November 1942, Convoy MFK 1Y left Gibraltar for the United Kingdom.

On 23 January 1943, Convoy WS 26 sailed from the Clyde, destined for Durban, South Africa via Freetown, Sierra Leone and Cape Town, South Africa. Letitia left the convoy at Freetown. On 27 February, Convoy KMF 10A formed off Orsay in conjunction with Convoy WS 27. On 18 May 1943, Convoy WS 30 left Liverpool, combining with Convoy KMF 15 off Orsay on 21 May. Letitia was a member of both these convoys.

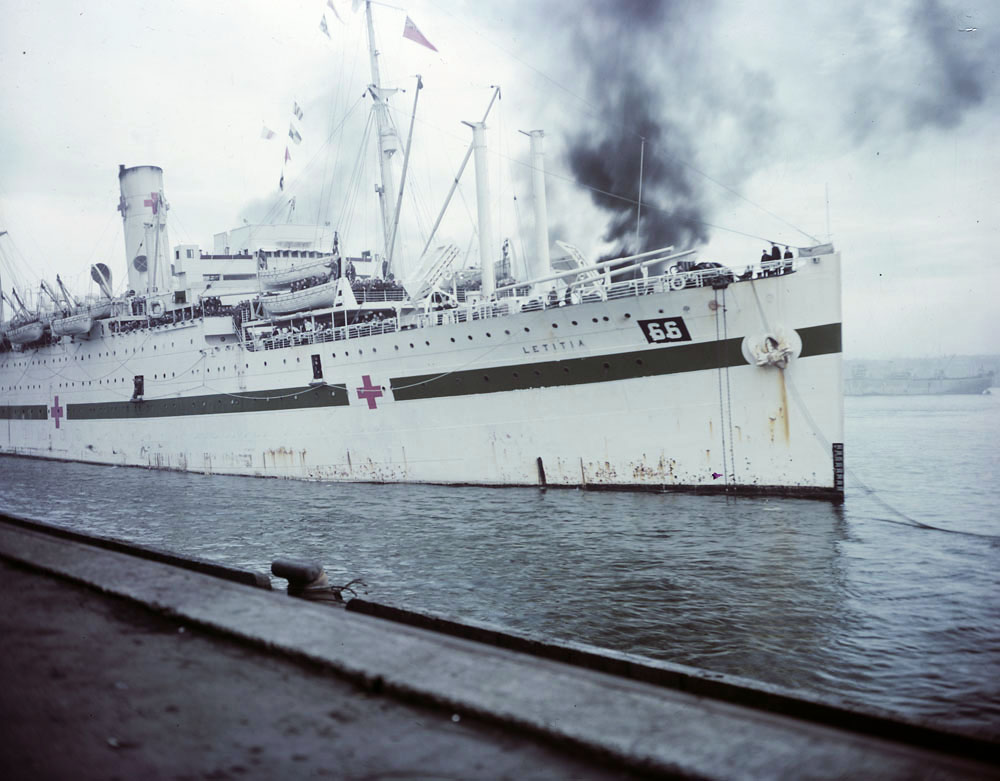
Letitia as a hospital ship arriving at Pier 21 in Halifax

On 4 November 1943, Convoy KMS left the United Kingdom for the Mediterranean. Letitia joined the convoy at Algiers and left at Philippeville. Letitia served in this role until 1943, when she was badly damaged. She was able to sail to the United States for repairs, after which she was used by the Canadian government as a hospital ship, carrying 200 medical personnel and with a capacity for 1,000 patients. She spent the remainder of the war carrying wounded Canadian personnel to the Pier 21 terminal at Halifax, Nova Scotia, and was due to be reassigned to the Pacific Ocean when the war ended. She continued in service in the immediate aftermath of the war, repatriating Canadian service personnel. She was sold in 1946, during this period as a transport, to the Ministry of Transport, which renamed her Empire Brent. The Ministry assigned her to be operated on their behalf by her previous owners, now trading as Donaldson Bros & Black Ltd.

=== Post-war service ===
While sailing for Halifax from Britain in 1946, Empire Brent collided with Stormont in the River Mersey on 20 November 1946, sinking Stormont and requiring Empire Brent to sail to Birkenhead to be dry-docked for repairs to her bow. A complete overhaul on the Clyde followed in December that year, during which time she was refitted again to be a troop ship. She sailed between India, the UK and the Far East for the next two years, before transferring to run an emigration service between the UK and Australia in 1949. She was on this service until being withdrawn and laid up in late 1950. After six months out of service she was refitted to carry emigrants from the UK to New Zealand, and renamed Captain Cook. She worked under charter to the Government of New Zealand, who paid for her in a series of instalments. She began her voyages in early 1952, sailing between Glasgow and Wellington via the Panama Canal. She briefly returned to her pre-war sailing route across the Atlantic from the UK to Canada in 1955, but then resumed the New Zealand route. A fire while in harbour at Wellington in 1957 caused extensive damage, but she was able to sail to the UK where she was repaired. The New Zealand government bought her outright by 1959. She made her final voyage to Glasgow in early 1960, and was then laid up at Falmouth, Cornwall. Captain Cook was then sold to BISCO, who towed her to Inverkeithing, where she arrived on 29 April 1960 to be scrapped.

== Official numbers and code letters ==
Official numbers were a forerunner to IMO Numbers. Letitia had the United Kingdom Official Number 148847. She had the code letters KSLT until 1933, and the Call sign GLBX from 1934.

== Sources ==
- Colledge, JJ (1970). Ships of the Royal Navy: An Historical Index. Vol. 2: Navy-built Trawlers, Drifters, Tugs and Requisitioned Ships. Newton Abbot: David & Charles.
- Osborne, Richard; Spong, Harry & Grover, Tom (2007). Armed Merchant Cruisers 1878–1945. Windsor, UK: World Warship Society. ISBN 978-0-9543310-8-5.
- Plowman, Peter (2006). Australian Migrant Ships 1946–1977. Rosenberg Publishing. ISBN 1-877058-40-8.
