= USS Haynsworth =

Allen M. Sumner-class destroyer

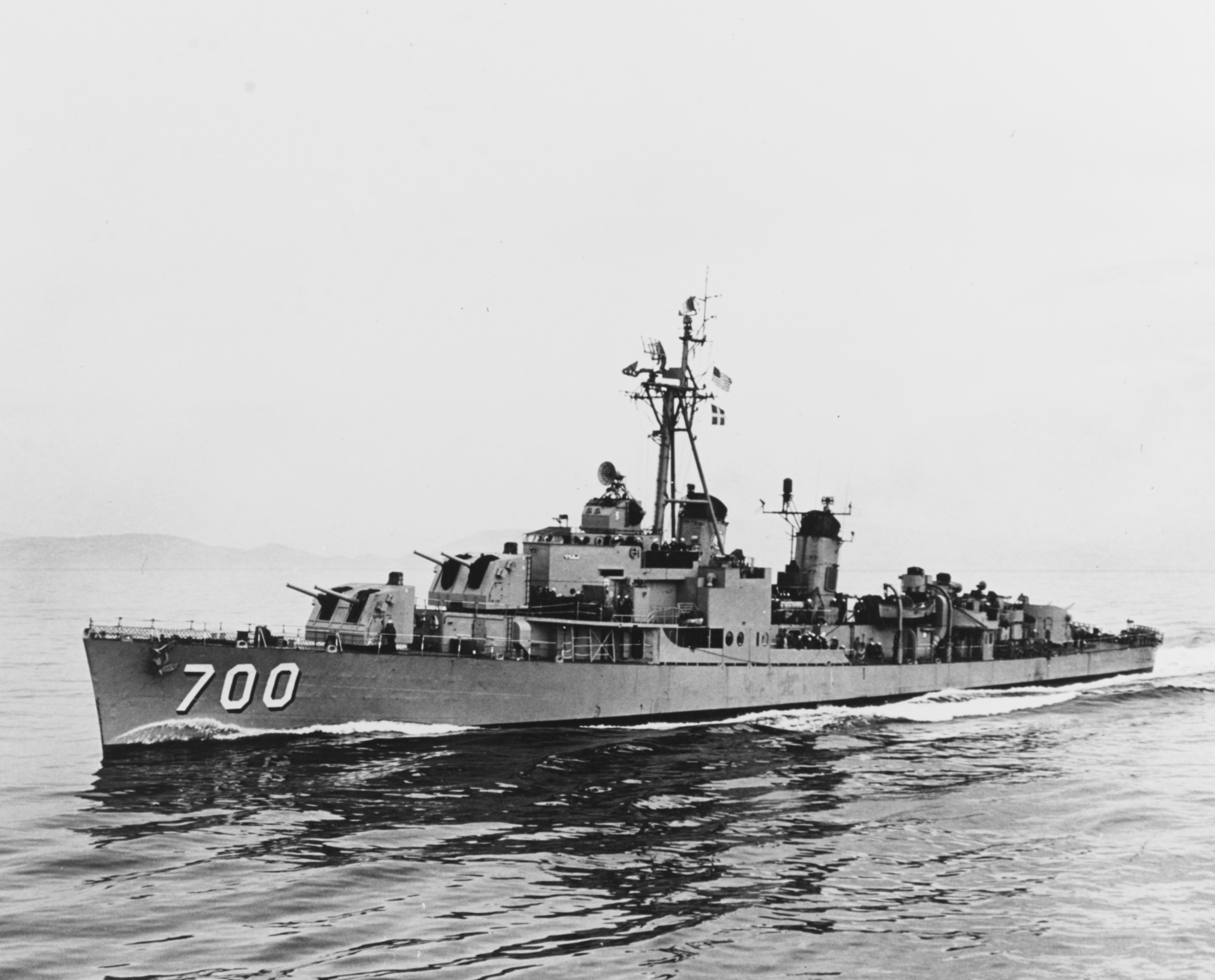
- USS Haynsworth underway in the 1950s

History

United States
- Name: Haynsworth
- Namesake: William McCall Haynsworth Jr.
- Builder: Federal Shipbuilding and Drydock Company
- Laid down: 16 December 1943
- Launched: 15 April 1944
- Sponsored by: Mrs. Haynsworth
- Commissioned: 22 June 1944
- Decommissioned: 30 January 1970
- Stricken: 30 January 1970
- Identification: Callsign: NJTA; Hull number: DD-700
- Honours and awards: See Awards
- Fate: Transferred to Taiwan, 12 May 1970
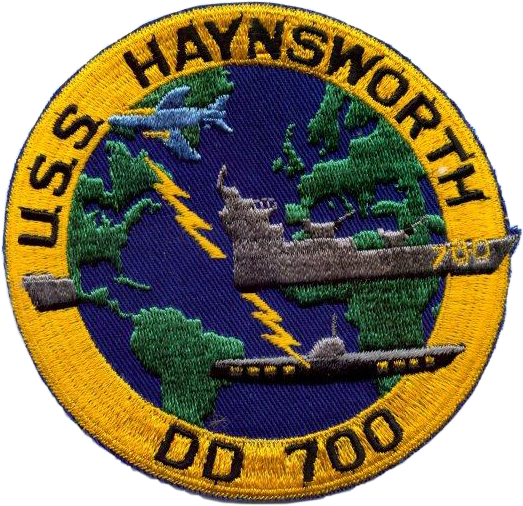
- Badge

Taiwan
- Name: Yue Yang; (岳陽)
- Namesake: Yue Yang
- Acquired: 30 January 1970
- Commissioned: 6 October 1970
- Identification: Hull number: DD-5
- Reclassified: DDG-944, 1 January 1976; DDG-905, 1 October 1979
- Decommissioned: 15 January 1999
- Fate: Sunk as artificial reef, 13 October 2001

General characteristics
- Class & type: Allen M. Sumner-class destroyer
- Displacement: 2,200 tons
- Length: 376 ft 6 in (114.76 m)
- Beam: 40 ft (12 m)
- Draft: 15 ft 8 in (4.78 m)
- Propulsion: 60,000 shp (45,000 kW); 2 propellers
- Speed: 34 kn (63 km/h; 39 mph)
- Range: 6,500 nmi (12,000 km; 7,500 mi) at 15 kn (28 km/h; 17 mph)
- Complement: 336
- Armament: 6 × 5 in (130 mm)/38 cal guns; 12 × 40 mm AA guns, 11 × 20 mm AA guns, 10 × 21 inch (533 mm) torpedo tubes, 6 × depth charge projectors, 2 × depth charge tracks

USS Haynsworth (DD-700), was an Allen M. Sumner-class destroyer of the United States Navy.

== Namesake ==
William McCall Haynsworth Jr. was born on 16 January 1901 in Darlington, South Carolina. He was appointed Midshipman from the Sixth Congressional District of South Carolina 19 June 1919. After graduation from the United States Naval Academy he reported for duty on board the destroyer USS Mahan on 16 June 1924, and was detached in April 1928 for postgraduate instruction in mechanical engineering at the Naval Academy, followed by postgraduate work at various colleges and industrial plants. He was assigned to the cruiser USS Houston on 10 November 1930 and detached in February 1934 to serve at the Naval Research Laboratory, Bellevue, District of Columbia until June 1936 when he was ordered to Houston as Assistant Fire Control Officer.

In April 1939 he reported to Charleston Navy Yard in connection with fitting out of USS Ingraham. He assumed command of Ingraham 19 July 1941 and with the outbreak of World War II commenced escort duty for convoys sailing from New York and Halifax to the British Isles. While investigating the collision of destroyer USS Buck with a merchant vessel, Ingraham was rammed by fleet oiler USS Chemung in dense fog off Nova Scotia, 22 August 1942. The force of the collision exploded Ingraham, killing Commander Haynsworth and all but ten men and one officer.

== Construction and career ==
Haynsworth was launched on 15 April 1944 by the Federal Shipbuilding & Drydock Co., Kearny, New Jersey; sponsored by Mrs. Haynsworth, widow of Commander Haynsworth; and commissioned on 22 June 1944.

=== Service in the United States Navy ===
==== China Coast, Taiwan ====
After shakedown in the Caribbean, Haynsworth departed New York on 20 September 1944 escorting Queen Mary with Prime Minister Winston Churchill on board.

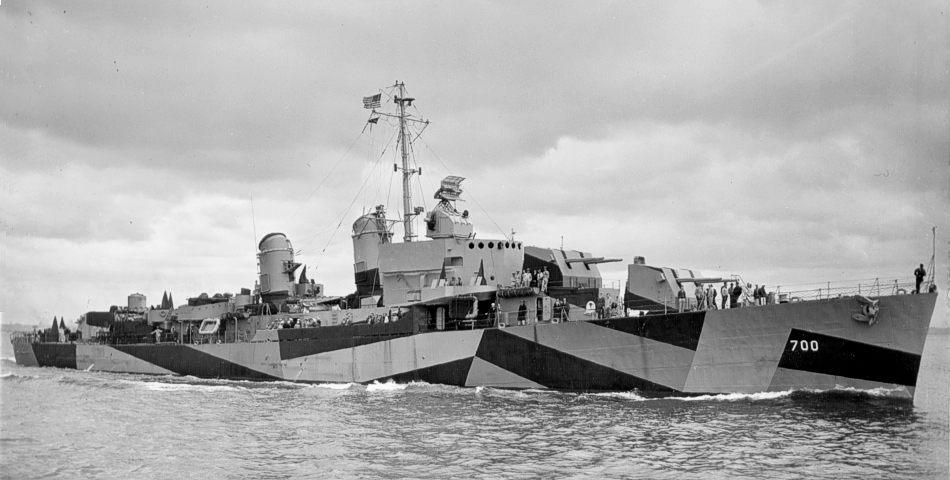
Haynsworth on 21 June 1944

Rendezvousing with British escorts, she returned to New York and sailed on 26 September via the Panama Canal Zone and San Pedro, arriving Pearl Harbor on 20 October. Haynsworth sailed on 16 December for Ulithi and joined Vice Admiral John McCain's Fast Carrier Task Force 38 for the final assaults on the Japanese. During the next three months, she operated with the 3rd and 5th Fleets as part of the screen for the Fast Carrier Task Force. Their primary mission was to conduct air strikes against strategic Japanese positions along the China coast, and Formosa, and to harass enemy shipping during the landings at Luzon on 9 January 1945.

==== China Coast, Indochina ====
The day after the invasion was launched, Task Force 38 moved into the South China Sea and conducted raids on the China coast and Indochina, doing much damage to the enemy.

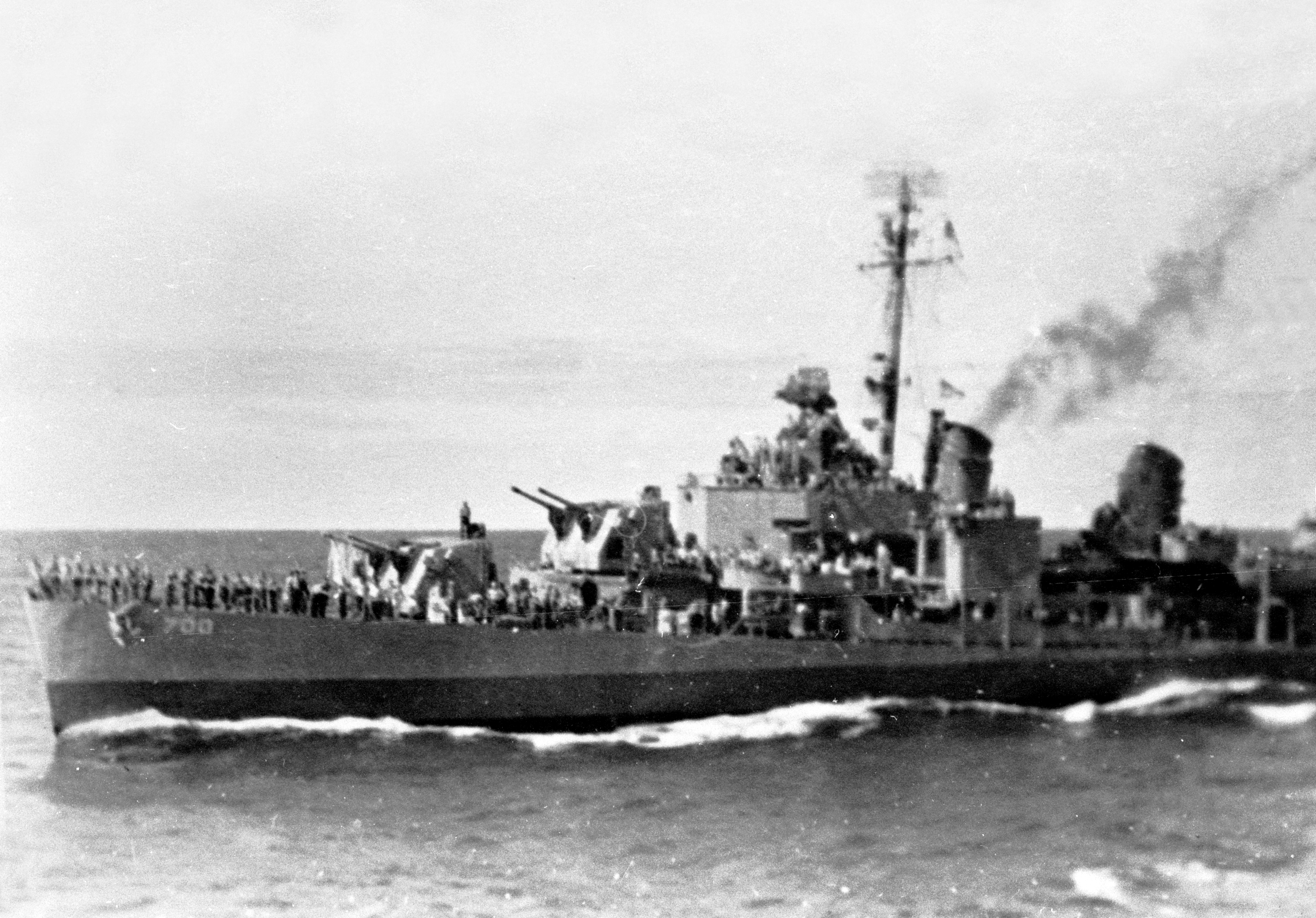
Haynsworth in the South Pacific in 1945

Launching one final raid against Okinawa, Haynsworth retired to Ulithi on 26 January. She sortied on 10 February with Admiral Marc Mitscher's Task Force 58 for strikes against airfields, factories, and shipping in the Tokyo area. Heavy fighter sweeps were launched on 16 February to cover the airfields around Tokyo Bay.

Despite heavy weather with low ceiling, most of the target areas were effectively neutralized. During the afternoon, three Japanese picket boats that had evaded detection in thick fog were spotted by Haynsworth and promptly sunk, taking 12 prisoners. In addition to damaging aircraft frame and engine plants, a number of ships and small craft were attacked and sunk in Tokyo Bay, the biggest prize being the 10,600-ton Yamashiro Maru.

==== Battle of Okinawa, kamikaze strike ====
As the Pacific War approached its climax, Haynsworth again sailed from Ulithi for further strikes against Japan. Massive air attacks were launched against airfields on Kyushu and ships in the Inland Sea 18 and 19 March, inflicting heavy damage on the dwindling Japanese air and sea power. After participating in the bombardment of enemy shore positions on Minami Daito Shima 28 March, she sailed for Okinawa. Landings were made on the Japanese fortress 1 April, with Task Force 58 providing support, and Haynsworth frequently aiding in the destruction of enemy aircraft during the many attacks, where "the fleet had come to stay." Only after she was crashed by a kamikaze 6 April did she have to retire to Mare Island via Ulithi for repairs.

After repairs Haynsworth had duty at Treasure Island, California, as a training ship from 17 July to 5 September. After several months of operations at Pearl Harbor, she sailed for the east coast on 14 January 1946, reaching Boston on 26 April for a year in the Reserve Fleet. Returning to active service in March 1947, Haynsworth based her operations from Algiers, Louisiana, conducting reserve training cruises in the Gulf and in the Caribbean until the summer of 1949.

Haynsworth sailed 6 September 1949 for her first duty with the 6th Fleet in the Mediterranean, returning to Norfolk on 7 February 1950. She arrived Charleston 10 days later, decommissioned there 19 May and joined the Reserve Fleet.

With the expansion of operations due to the Korean War, Haynsworth recommissioned at Charleston 22 September 1950. Following training and operations along the East Coast and in the Caribbean she sailed 3 September 1951 for duty in the Mediterranean.

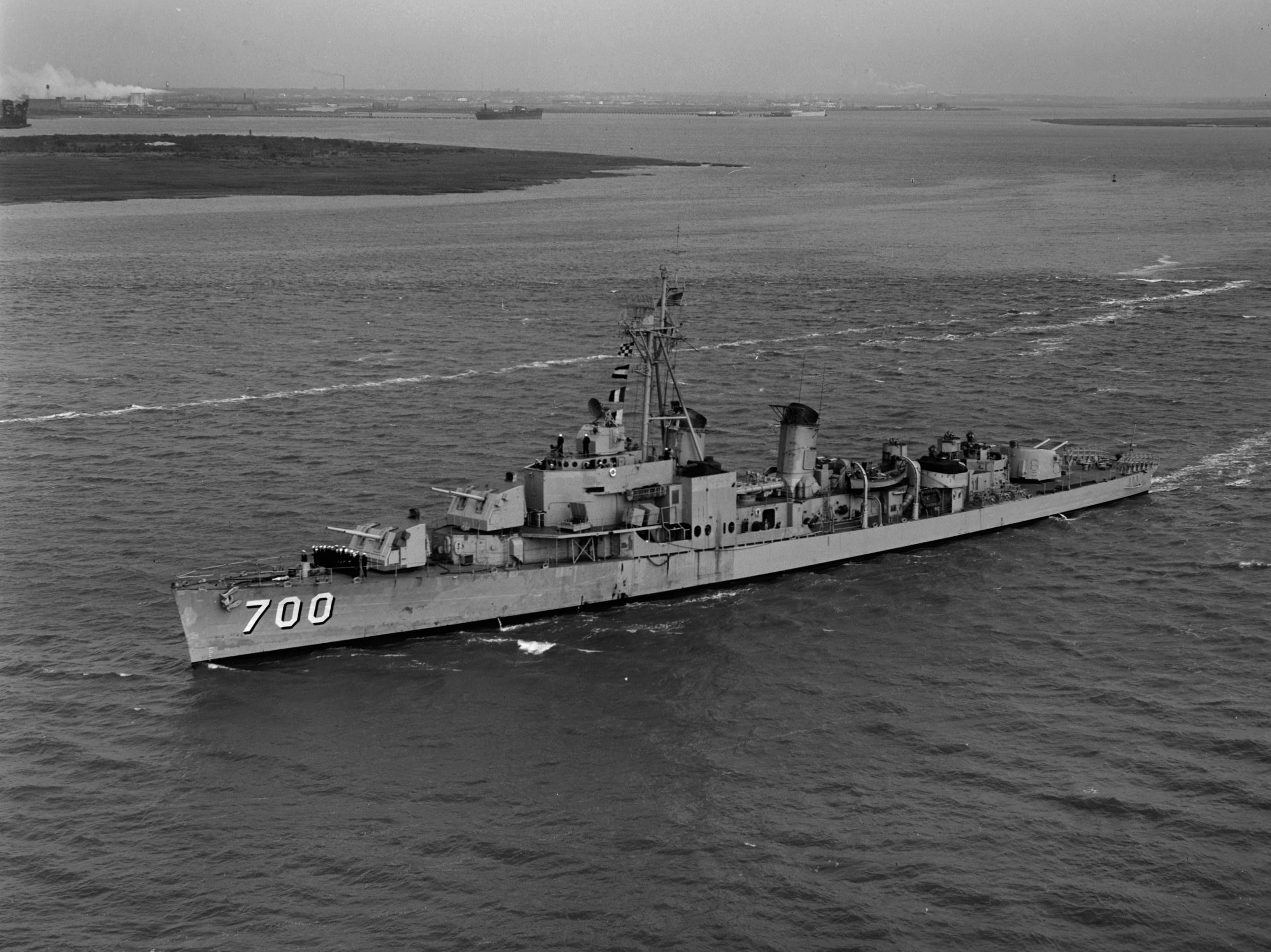
Haynsworth underway on 3 July 1953

After more operations on the East Coast and in the Caribbean, and a midshipman cruise to the North Atlantic, Haynsworth sailed from Norfolk on 2 November 1953 for a round-the-world cruise. While in the Pacific she was assigned duty for four months in the Far East with the 7th Fleet. While conducting night antisubmarine exercises off Pusan on or around 23 December 1953, Haynsworth collided with the destroyer Ault, killing a sailor on board (Eugene Merrill Whittington of Buffalo, West Virginia) Haynsworth and damaging her bow. The accident required both ships to proceed to Yokosuka for repairs. Haynsworth returned to Norfolk 4 June 1954 to resume her support of the 6th Fleet. In 1958, with the Suez Crisis still unsettled, Navy units stood by in the eastern Mediterranean and evacuated U.S. nationals from Egypt. Haynsworth aided the Navy's preparedness in the event of any conflict. Between 1956 and 1960, she made five deployments to the Mediterranean, supporting the Navy's peacekeeping role and keeping a watchful eye on the troubled spots of the free world. In 1959, Haynsworth took part in the historic Operation Inland Seas, commemorating the opening of the mighty St. Lawrence Seaway, steaming up the St. Lawrence to Montreal.

Late in 1961, while in the Mediterranean, Haynsworth delivered emergency food rations to flood-ravaged Africa, and on 3 October 1962, she stood by off Cape Canaveral as a rescue ship and witnessed the take off of astronaut Comdr. Walter Schirra in Mercury-Atlas 8. Later that month, under much more serious circumstances, she hastened to the Caribbean and participated in the naval quarantine of Cuba, during the Cuban Missile Crisis.

In February 1963, Haynsworth deployed to the Mediterranean, the Red Sea, and the Gulf of Aden for operations with the 6th Fleet. After returning to Norfolk, she embarked midshipmen for an Atlantic cruise from 1 August to 10 September; then underwent overhaul at New Orleans, and Orange, Texas, before arriving Galveston, Texas on 28 February 1964 to begin duty as a Naval Reserve training ship.

After being assigned to Reserve Destroyer Squadron 34, Haynsworth operated out of Galveston while providing valuable on board training facilities for hundreds of Naval Reservists. Manned by a nucleus crew, she steamed to ports along the Gulf and Atlantic coasts, and numerous training cruises carried her into the Caribbean.

She was decommissioned and stricken on 30 January 1970 and immediately sold to the Republic of China.

=== Service in the Republic of China Navy ===
On 12 May 1970, Haynsworth was transferred to Taiwan and renamed ROCS Yue Yang (DD-5). She was towed from the United States on 20 September 1970, and she was officially commissioned on 6 October. On 20 October 1973, Heng Yang, Yue Yang, Fu Yang and the East Navy warships held a naval exercise for returning overseas Chinese off Kaohsiung. The ships demonstrated their offensive strength and joint anti-submarine operations.

During the implementation of a modernization project on Yueyang in 1985, the CR-201 Trainable Chaff Rocket Launcher was installed. The ship has combat capabilities such as air-air, naval combat, anti-submarine, and naval shore bombing support.

She was gradually modified the ship's weapon system, 1 January 1976, her number was changed to DDG-944.

Again on 1 October 1979, her number was changed to DDG-905.

On 20 February 1986, Fu Yang, Sui Yang, Nan Yang, Yue Yang, Hua Yang and others took part in the search for the crashed China Airlines flight No. 1870 in the waters of Penghu. A boat has been found drifting with objects or possible oil slicks on the sea, but these have been denied by the technical personnel of the Civil Aviation Administration.

Yue Yang served for 28 years before being decommissioned on 15 January 1999 and sunk as artificial reef on 13 October 2001.

== Awards ==
- Asiatic–Pacific Campaign Medal with three battle stars
- World War II Victory Medal
- Navy Occupation Medal with Europe clasp
- National Defense Service Medal with one bronze service star
- Armed Forces Expeditionary Medal
