= Large-Scale Exercise 2021 =

US Navy exercise

Large-Scale Exercise 2021 is a United States Navy exercise which took place from August 3, 2021 to August 15, 2021. The exercise aimed to test the ability of the United States to counter both Russia and China simultaneously in the European and Indo-Pacific theaters.

Another object of the exercise was to test "warfighting concepts that are not fully refined," according to deputy exercise director Colonel Nicholas Nuzzo, USMC. These included concepts like distributed maritime operations and expeditionary advanced base operations. It is intended that the exercise be repeated every three years.

One feature of the exercise was the use of the Navy Continuous Training Environment, a system designed to link units in multiple locations so they can train using the same scenarios. The system is able to link simulators, ships (both in port and at sea), and aircraft. According to one source, the system allows "sailors making decisions in the combat information center in the belly of a cruiser in Norfolk [to] determine the fate of a simulated carrier strike group off Norway" as part of the exercise. The exercise involved both real and simulated units. This also included the sinking of a decommissioned frigate (the USS Ingraham) in a live fire exercise.

The exercise was the largest United States Navy exercise since 1981. It was originally scheduled for 2020, but was postponed in March of that year due to COVID-19 restrictions.
