= USS Buck (DD-761) =

Allen M. Sumner-class destroyer

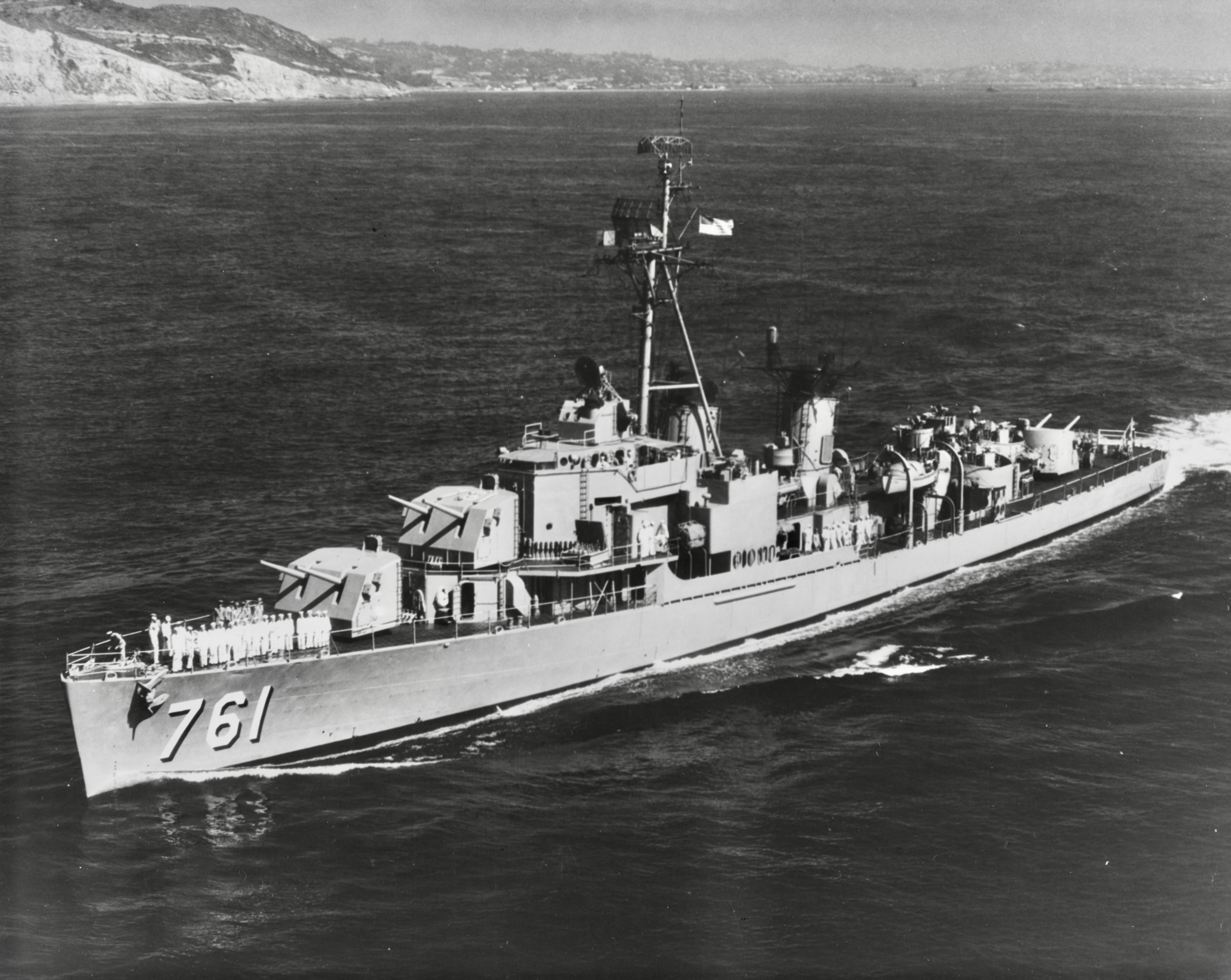
- USS Buck

History

United States
- Name: Buck
- Namesake: James Buck
- Builder: Bethlehem Steel, San Francisco
- Laid down: 1 February 1944
- Launched: 11 March 1945
- Commissioned: 28 June 1946
- Stricken: 15 July 1973
- Fate: To Brazil 16 July 1973

Brazil
- Name: Alagoas
- Acquired: 16 July 1973
- Stricken: 30 June 1995
- Fate: Scrapped

General characteristics
- Class & type: Allen M. Sumner-class destroyer
- Displacement: 2,200 tons
- Length: 376 ft 6 in (114.76 m)
- Beam: 40 ft (12 m)
- Draft: 15 ft 8 in (4.78 m)
- Propulsion: 60,000 shp (45,000 kW); 2 propellers
- Speed: 34 knots (63 km/h; 39 mph)
- Range: 6,500 nmi (12,000 km; 7,500 mi) at 15 kn (28 km/h; 17 mph)
- Complement: 336
- Armament: 6 × 5 in (127 mm)/38 cal. guns, 12 × 40 mm AA guns, 11 × 20 mm AA guns, 10 × 21 inch (533 mm) torpedo tubes, 6 × depth charge projectors, 2 × depth charge tracks

The third USS Buck (DD-761), an Allen M. Sumner-class destroyer, was the second ship of the United States Navy to be named for James Buck, a Civil War Medal of Honor Recipient.

The second Buck (DD-761) was launched on 11 March 1945 by Bethlehem Steel Co., San Francisco, California, sponsored by Miss Mary Nimitz, daughter of Fleet Admiral Chester W. Nimitz; and commissioned on 28 June 1946.

== Service history ==
After completion of shakedown in September 1946, Buck operated with the Pacific Fleet along the west coast from Acapulco, Mexico, to Ketchikan, Alaska. Between December 1948 and the summer of 1949 Buck made a cruise to the Far East. Upon her return to San Diego she participated in reserve cruises along the west coast and in Operation Miki off the Hawaiian Islands. Buck departed the United States on 11 January 1950 for her second Western Pacific tour and returned to California on 25 April 1950. Shortly thereafter, she entered San Francisco Naval Shipyard for overhaul.

=== Korea and Vietnam ===
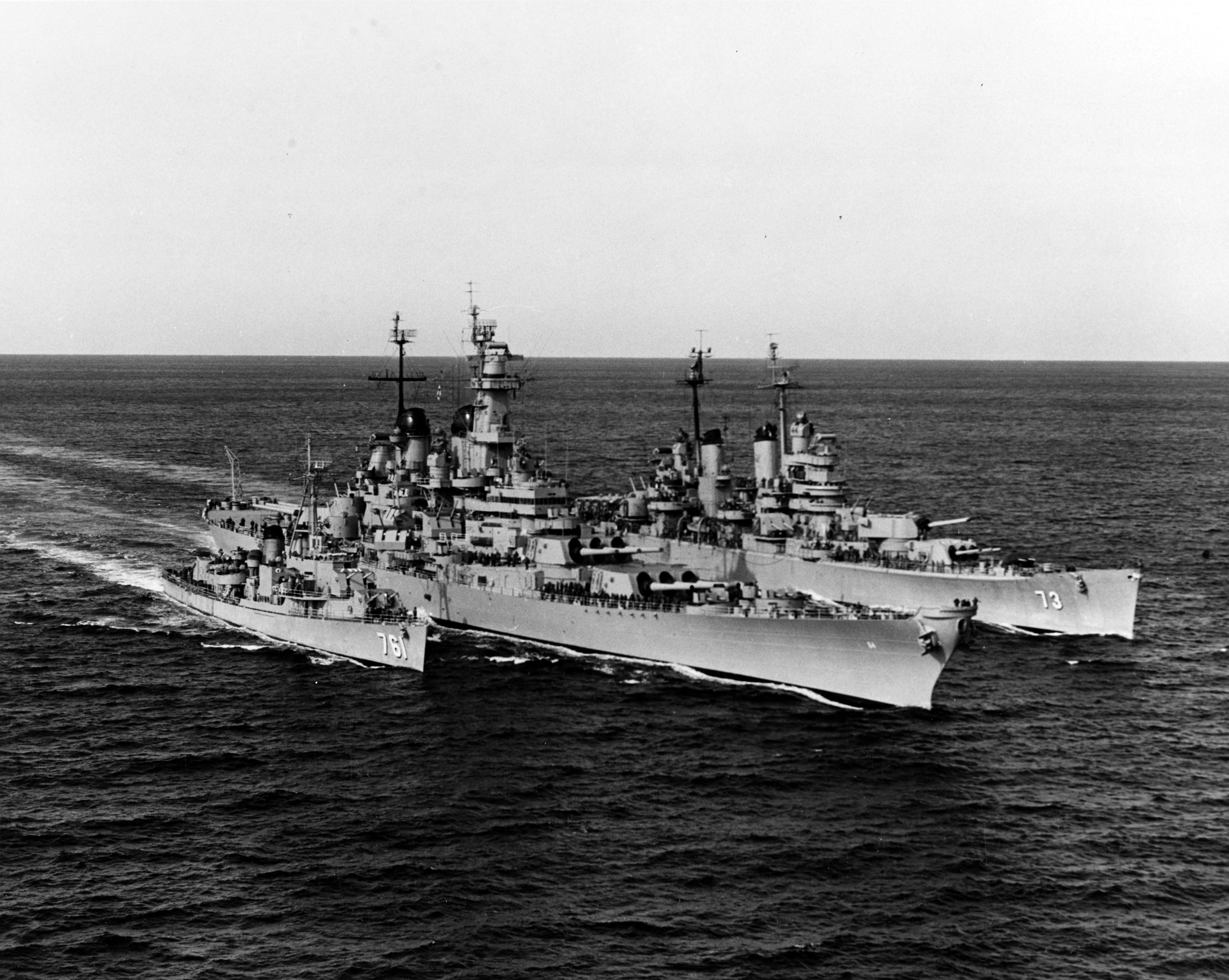
Buck, Wisconsin and Saint Paul steam in close formation during operations off the Korean coast, 1952

Late in 1950, as a unit of Destroyer Division 71, Buck joined the United Nations Forces in Korea. While there she suffered considerable damage in a collision with the destroyer John W. Thomason. Buck was ordered back to the west coast after temporary repairs at Sasebo, Japan. Between January and March 1951 she underwent repairs at Bremerton, Washington, and then returned to Korean waters arriving 30 April 1951. She operated with United Nations Forces until July when she returned to the west coast. In January 1952 Buck, with Destroyer Division 71, departed for another tour in the Western Pacific. She operated with the shore bombardment forces and with the fast carrier task force until returning to San Diego 11 July 1952. On her sixth Far Eastern tour, between 21 February and 22 September 1953, she operated with TF's 72, 77, 95, 96, and 97 off Korea until the Armistice was declared.

Buck remained with the Pacific Fleet for the next two decades, conducting periodic deployments to the Far East. During these cruises, Buck escorted aircraft carriers, conducted anti-submarine warfare exercises and carried out security patrols off China and the Formosa Strait. Following a Fleet Rehabilitation and Modernization (FRAM) II conversion in 1961–62, the destroyer resumed Far East deployments, conducting her first Vietnam cruise in 1965, during which she carried out Market Time maritime interdiction patrols.

Buck received six battle stars for her Korean service and six battle stars for Vietnam service.

=== Brazilian service ===
Buck decommissioned at San Diego on 16 July 1973 and transferred to the government of Brazil that same day. The destroyer served in the Brazilian Navy as Alagoas (D 36) until retired on 30 June 1995 and broken up for scrap.
