= James Buck (Medal of Honor) =

- Civil War era Navy Medal of Honor
- Born: c. 1808; Baltimore, Maryland, US
- Died: November 1, 1865 (aged 56–57); Baltimore, Maryland, US
- Burial place: Green Mount Cemetery, Baltimore
- Military career
- Allegiance: United States; Union
- Branch: United States Navy; Union Navy
- Service years: 1852–1865
- Rank: Quartermaster
- Unit: USS Brooklyn
- Conflicts: American Civil War
- Awards: Medal of Honor

James Buck (c. 1808 – November 1, 1865) was an American Civil War Medal of Honor recipient and a sailor in the United States Navy.

== Biography ==
Born in Baltimore, Maryland, Buck joined the Navy in 1852 as an Acting Master's Mate and he was awarded the Medal of Honor as a Quartermaster under General Order 11, dated April 3, 1863.

Buck is buried in Greenmount Cemetery in Baltimore.

== Honors ==
The United States Navy named three ships after him — USS Buck. The first ship to be named after Buck, USS Buck (SP-1355) was a motorboat built in 1911. The second ship to be named after Buck was USS Buck (DD-420), a Sims-class destroyer, that served from 1939 until she was sunk during the invasion of Italy in 1943. The third and final ship to take its name from James Buck was USS Buck (DD-761), an Allen M. Sumner-class destroyer, which served from 1946 until 1973.

== Medal of Honor citation ==
Rank and organization: Quartermaster, U.S. Navy. Born: 1808, Baltimore, Md. G.O. No.: 11, April 3, 1863.

Citation:

Served on board the U.S.S. Brooklyn in the attack upon Forts Jackson and St. Philip and at the taking of New Orleans, 24 and 25 April 1862. Although severely wounded by a heavy splinter, Buck continued to perform his duty until positively ordered below. Later stealing back to his post, he steered the ship for 8 hours despite his critical condition. His bravery was typical of the type which resulted in the taking of the Forts Jackson and St. Philip and in the capture of New Orleans.

== See also ==
- List of American Civil War Medal of Honor recipients: A–F
