= Koszta Affair =

1853 diplomatic episode between Austria and the USA

- Part of Hungarian Revolution of 1848
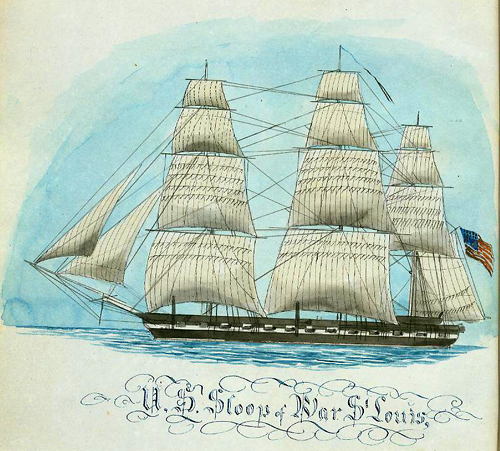
- USS St. Louis, the sloop used by Captain Ingraham to threaten the Austrian brig Huszár.
Date	July 2, 1853
Location	Smyrna (present day İzmir, Turkey)
Result	United States victory Martin Koszta released

Belligerents
United States	Austrian Empire

Commanders and leaders
Captain Duncan Ingraham	Unknown

Strength
1 sloop-of-war	1 brig-of-war

The Koszta Affair (1853) was the name applied to a diplomatic episode between the United States and the Austrian Empire involving the rights in foreign countries of new Americans who were not yet fully naturalized.

== Background ==
Martin Koszta, a man of Hungarian birth, had taken part in the political movement of 1848-49 to separate Hungary from the Austrian Empire. He fled to Turkey, then emigrated to the United States. In July 1852, he made a declaration under oath of his intention to become a citizen of the United States and, at the same time, renounced all allegiance to any foreign power.

== Abduction ==
After residing in the United States for a year and eleven months, Koszta returned to Turkey on private business. He was placed under the protection of the United States by the American consul at Smyrna and the American chargé d'affaires ad interim at Constantinople. While waiting to return to the United States, Koszta was captured by Austrian officers and taken by force aboard the Austrian brig-of-war Huszár and confined in chains. According to historian Mark Power Smith, he was abducted from a public café by agents hired by the Austrian consul. United States officials protested in vain to the Turkish government and the Austrian officers.

Americans learned of rumors that the prisoner was to be transported secretly to Trieste. Under instructions from the American Minister at Constantinople, Captain Duncan Ingraham of the United States sloop-of-war Saint Louis, which was then lying in Smyrna harbor, on July 2, 1853, threatened to open fire on the Huszar if Koszta was not surrendered to him by four o'clock. The Austrian consul general agreed to allow Koszta to be held by the consul general of France until some agreement with the United States could be reached.

== Diplomacy ==
On August 29, 1853, Baron Hülsemann, the Austrian chargé d'affaires in Washington, wrote to Secretary of State William L. Marcy, asking for the United States to "disavow the conduct of its agents, ... hasten to call them to a severe account, and tender to Austria a satisfaction proportionate to the outrage." He said that Koszta was not a naturalized citizen of the US and had never ceased to be a citizen of Austria. Ingraham's threat was thus in violation of international law.

Marcy replied on September 26, 1853, in what is known as the Hülsemann letter. He defended the position of the United States throughout on the ground that Koszta had ceased to be a citizen of Austria even by the law of Austria. His letter said;

that Koszta when seized and imprisoned was invested with the nationality of the United States, and they had therefore the right, if they chose to exercise it, to extend their protection to him; that from international law – the only law which can be rightfully appealed to for rules in this case – Austria could derive no authority to obstruct or interfere with the United States in the exercise of this right, in effecting the liberation of Koszta; and that Captain Ingraham's interposition for his release was, under the extraordinary circumstances of the case, right and proper.

The letter was published, to great enthusiasm throughout the United States. The State Department's position in relation to the status of immigrants who were not fully naturalized has been endorsed by various well-known authorities on international law.

Koszta was ultimately released by Austria and allowed to return to the United States. The United States Congress passed a joint resolution of thanks to Captain Ingraham and decorated him with the Congressional Gold Medal, in commemoration of his services.

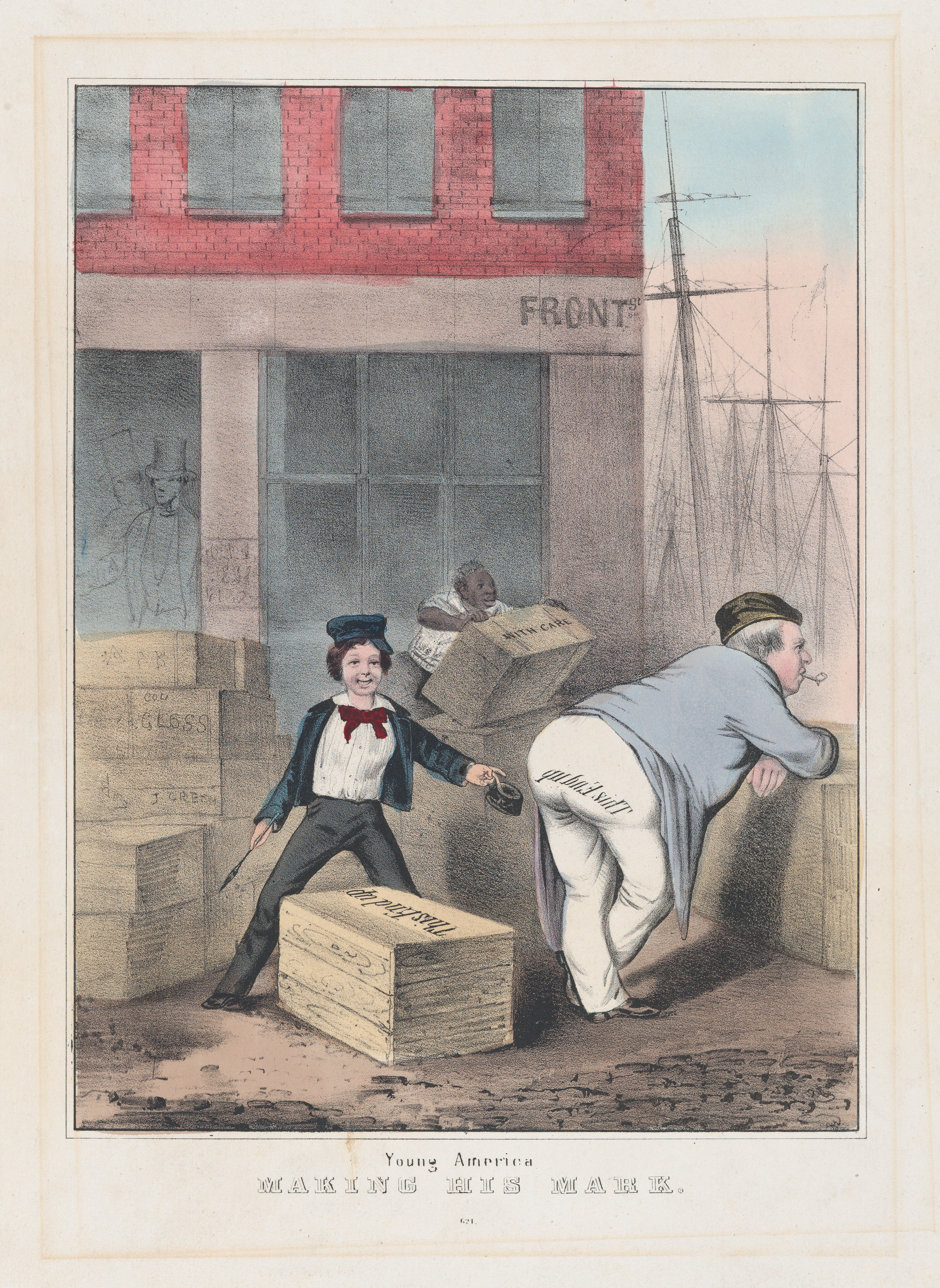
"Young America Making His Mark" (ca. 1840s). This allegorical lithograph represents the ideals of the Young America Movement, which influenced U.S. foreign policy during the Koszta Affair by promoting national self-determination and assertive democratic interventionism.

Beyond the immediate diplomatic conflict, the Koszta Affair had substantial ideological, legal, and diplomatic ramifications, as recent scholarship has discussed. Historian Mark Power Smith argues that the affair significantly empowered the Young America Movement, a faction within the Democratic Party advocating for expansionism and an inclusive vision of nationalism, particularly toward white European immigrants. According to Smith, the Koszta Affair provided a prominent example through which the Young America Movement challenged restrictive definitions of citizenship. By successfully advocating for the rights of Martin Koszta, an immigrant who was not yet fully naturalized, the movement gained political momentum and public visibility. Smith writes that "Young America's leaders seized upon the Koszta Affair as proof that America's national destiny was linked intrinsically with democratic principles and expansive citizenship rights." The event also resonated among radical European nationalists, who viewed America's defense of Koszta as evidence of democratic solidarity, strengthening the country's international image as a champion of democratic ideals.

Historian Rob Howell examines the legal and diplomatic impact of the affair through Secretary of State William L. Marcy's articulation of the doctrine of domiciliation. Howell defines domiciliation as the principle that residence and demonstrated intent to naturalize in a new country are sufficient grounds for receiving diplomatic protection from that country. He argues that Marcy's position shifted international norms by asserting that the United States could protect individuals based on domicile rather than formal citizenship alone. Howell contends that "Marcy's doctrine of domiciliation reshaped international legal thought and set a precedent that would influence U.S. foreign policy decisions throughout the late nineteenth century." An example of this influence is seen in subsequent American diplomatic interventions on behalf of residents abroad who had not completed formal naturalization but sought U.S. protection. Marcy's successful negotiation of Koszta's release without military confrontation also bolstered America's diplomatic credibility internationally.

Thus, the Koszta Affair's significance extended beyond a single diplomatic incident, influencing ideological movements within the United States, reshaping concepts of citizenship, and setting important legal precedents in international diplomacy.
