= USS Buck (DD-420) =

Sims-class destroyer

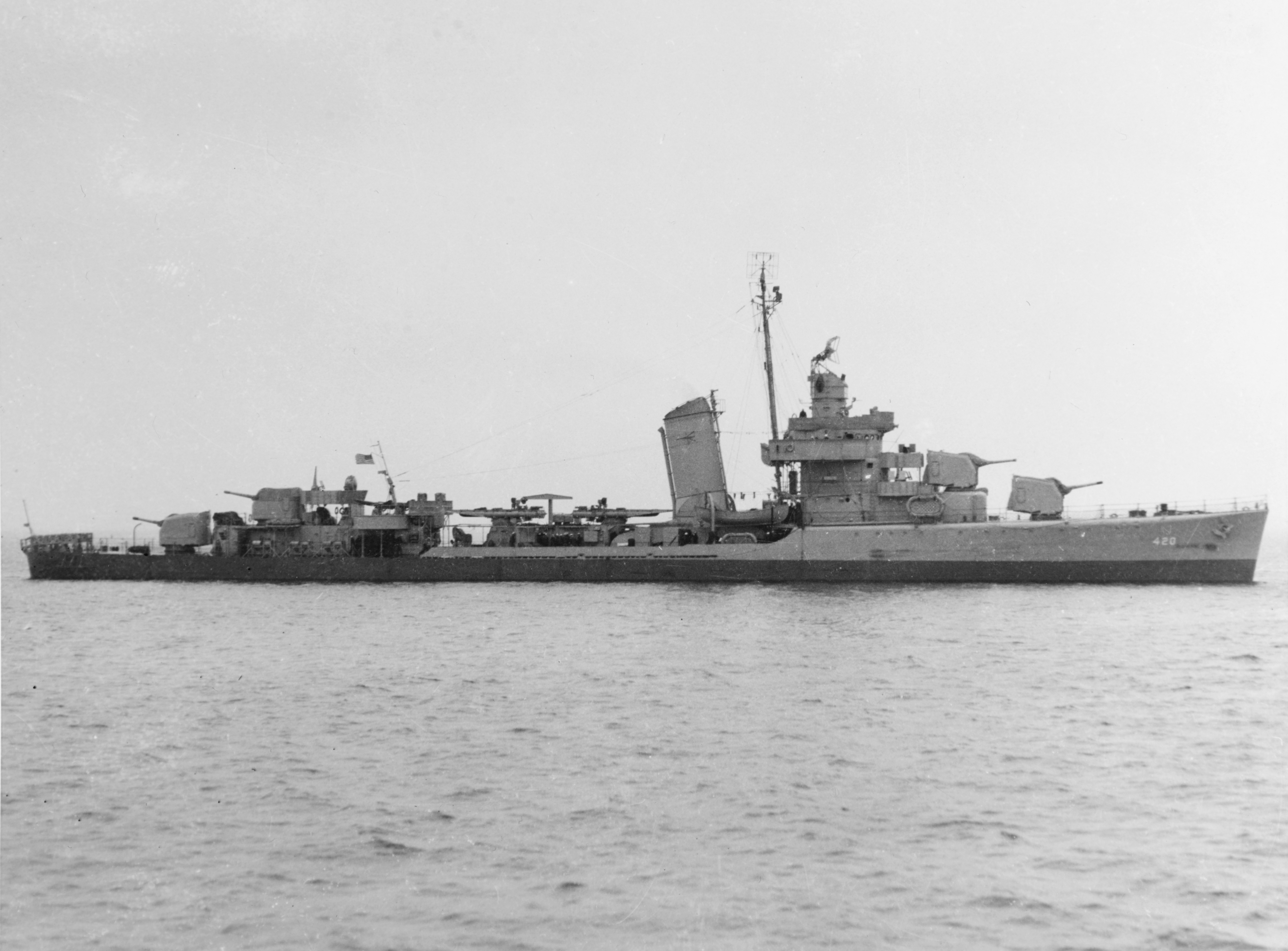
- USS Buck (DD-420)

History

United States
- Name: USS Buck
- Namesake: James Buck
- Builder: Philadelphia Naval Shipyard
- Laid down: 6 April 1938
- Launched: 22 May 1939
- Commissioned: 15 May 1940
- Identification: DD-420
- Honors and awards: American Defense Service Medal ("Fleet" clasp, "A" device); European-African-Middle Eastern Campaign Medal (3 stars); World War II Victory Medal
- Fate: Torpedoed and sunk off Salerno, 9 October 1943

General characteristics
- Class & type: Sims-class destroyer
- Displacement: 1,570 long tons (1,600 t) (std); 2,211 long tons (2,246 t) (full)
- Length: 348 ft 3 1/4 in (106.2 m)
- Beam: 36 ft 1 in (11.0 m)
- Draft: 13 ft 4.5 in (4.1 m)
- Propulsion: High-pressure super-heated boilers; Geared turbines with twin screws; 50,000 hp (37,000 kW)
- Speed: 35 knots (65 km/h; 40 mph)
- Range: 3,660 nmi (6,780 km; 4,210 mi) at 20 kn (37 km/h; 23 mph)
- Complement: 192 (10 officers/182 enlisted)
- Armament: 5 × 5 inch/38, in single mounts; 4 × .50 caliber/90, in single mounts; 8 × 21 inch torpedo tubes in two quadruple mounts; 2 × depth charge track, 10 depth charges

The second USS Buck (DD-420), a World War II-era Sims-class destroyer in the service of the United States Navy, was named after Quartermaster James Buck, a Civil War Medal of Honor recipient. It was built by Philadelphia Naval Shipyard and launched in 1939. It was a member of the convoy carrying the US 1st Provisional Marine Brigade. She served during the Second World War. It was sunk by the German submarine U-616 on 9 October 1943 off the coast of Salerno, when it was working in support of Operation Avalanche. It received 3 battle stars for its services during the Second World War.

== Early career ==
Buck was launched on 22 May 1939 by the Philadelphia Navy Yard. It was sponsored by Mrs. Julius C. Townsend, wife of Rear Admiral Townsend, and commissioned on 15 May 1940.

After shakedown training, Buck joined the Atlantic Fleet for a brief period before augmenting the Pacific Fleet from February until June 1941. On 1 July, as part of Task Force (TF) 19, Buck got underway for NS Argentia, Newfoundland, where it joined a convoy carrying US's 1st Provisional Marine Brigade to Reykjavík, Iceland. After landing the Marines there on 7 July, the destroyer began convoy escort duty between Iceland and the United States.

== World War II ==
=== Atlantic convoys ===
With the entry of the United States into World War II Buck continued to serve as a convoy escort, steaming from the seaports of the eastern United States to ports in Newfoundland, Iceland, Northern Ireland, North Africa, and the Caribbean. As a convoy escort warship, Buck screened ships from enemy attack, pursued unidentified surface and underwater contacts and shepherded merchantmen to keep them in formation while underway.

While escorting a convoy during a dense fog off Nova Scotia on 22 August 1942, Buck was struck starboard side by the New Zealand troop-transport Awatea while trying to escort another vessel to her correct position in the convoy. The impact broke Buck's keel and sliced about two-thirds through the fantail. Seven sailors were killed in the collision. As the starboard propeller was wrecked, and the port propeller damaged, the destroyer maintained to steer away with a lot of difficulty as the crew tried to secure the fantail with lines and wires. When the port propeller fell off a few hours later, leaving the destroyer helpless, the fantail was cut loose since wave action was battering and chafing the hull. When the destroyer Ingraham came to assist she was mortally damaged by a collision with oiler Chemung. After rescuing the survivors from Ingraham, the oiler managed to take Buck under tow until relieved by the fleet tug Cherokee. Buck reached Boston on 26 August, where she underwent repairs until November. Upon completion of yard work she returned to Atlantic convoy escort duty that winter, guarding convoys to European waters into June 1943, when she was ordered to the Mediterranean for patrol duty out of Tunisian and Algerian ports.

=== European invasions ===
Assigned to the Western Naval Task Force on 8 July, Buck performed bombardment, screening, and patrol duties during Operation Husky, the invasion of Sicily (10 July 1943). On 10 July, the destroyer escorted a landing convoy of LCTs to the beach before retiring to escort follow-on convoys to Sicily. On 3 August, while escorting a convoy of six cargo ships from Sicily to Algeria, Buck spotted the Italian submarine Argento making a reconnaissance patrol off the Sicilian coast. The destroyer pursued and forced the submarine to surface after three depth charge attacks. The Italians quickly abandoned ship under the destroyers' heavy gunfire and the submarine sank at 36°52′N 12°8′E, with Buck taking 45 of her crew of 49 as prisoners.

After escorting a convoy back to the United States, the destroyer returned to the Mediterranean in late September 1943 in support of Operation Avalanche, the landings at Salerno, Italy. Following the landings, the destroyer patrolled off the coast to protect the delivery of reinforcements and supplies to southern Italy. While on patrol off Salerno, Italy, on 9 October, Buck was ambushed just after midnight by German submarine U-616 commanded by Siegfried Koitschka and hit forward starboard by at least one and possibly two torpedoes. The warship flooded quickly, settling down forward and sinking within four minutes. Although most of the depth charges were set to safe before the destroyer was abandoned, a severe underwater explosion killed and wounded sailors in the water. Spotted by friendly aircraft the next morning, 97 survivors were rescued by the destroyer Gleaves and the British LCT-170 the following evening.

Buck received three battle stars for World War II service.

== Convoys escorted ==
Convoy	Escort Group	Dates	Notes
	task force 19	1–7 July 1941	occupation of Iceland prior to US declaration of war
HX 158		5-13 Nov 1941	from Newfoundland to Iceland prior to US declaration of war
ON 37		22-30 Nov 1941	from Iceland to Newfoundland prior to US declaration of war
HX 165		17-24 Dec 1941	from Newfoundland to Iceland
ON 51		2-11 Jan 1942	from Iceland to Newfoundland
HX 172		28 Jan-4 Feb 1942	from Newfoundland to Iceland
ON 65		12-19 Feb 1942	from Iceland to Newfoundland
HX 179	MOEF group A5	13–22 March 1942	from Newfoundland to Northern Ireland
ON 81	MOEF group A5	30 March-9 April 1942	from Northern Ireland to Newfoundland
AT 17		1–12 July 1942	troopships from New York City to Firth of Clyde
