= USS Ingraham (DD-444) =

Gleaves-class destroyer

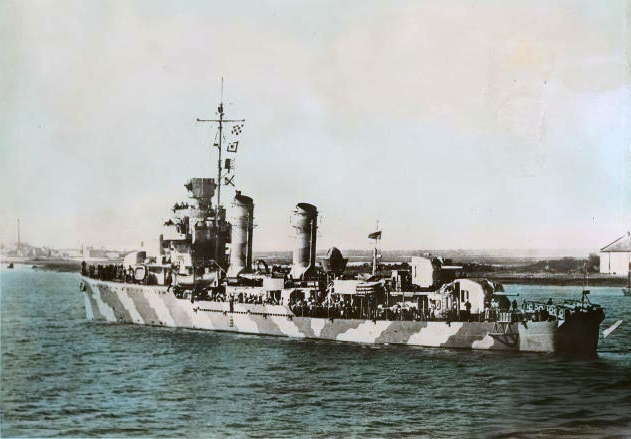
- USS Ingraham

History

United States
- Name: USS Ingraham
- Namesake: Duncan Ingraham
- Builder: Charleston Navy Yard
- Laid down: 15 November 1939
- Launched: 15 February 1941
- Commissioned: 19 July 1941
- Stricken: 11 September 1942
- Fate: Sunk in collision, 22 August 1942

General characteristics
- Class & type: Gleaves-class destroyer
- Displacement: 1,600 long tons (1,626 t)
- Length: 347 ft 9 in (105.99 m)
- Beam: 36 ft 1 in (11.00 m)
- Draft: 11 ft 10 in (3.61 m)
- Installed power: 50,000 shp (37,000 kW)
- Propulsion: 2 × steam turbines; 4 × boilers; 2 × shafts
- Speed: 33 kn (38 mph; 61 km/h)
- Range: 6,500 nmi (7,500 mi; 12,000 km) at 12 kn (14 mph; 22 km/h)
- Complement: 208
- Armament: 5 × 5 in (127 mm) dual purpose guns; 12 × 0.5 in (12.7 mm) machine guns, 10 × 21 in (533 mm) torpedo tubes, 1 × Y-gun depth charge projector, 2 × depth charge tracks

USS Ingraham (DD-444), a Gleaves-class destroyer, was the second ship of the United States Navy to be named for Captain Duncan Ingraham (1802–1891), who was awarded a Congressional Gold Medal following his actions regarding Martin Koszta, a Hungarian who had declared in New York his intention of becoming an American citizen, and who had been seized and confined in the Austrian ship Hussar.

Ingraham was launched on 15 February 1941 by the Charleston Navy Yard; sponsored by Mrs. George Ingraham Hutchinson, granddaughter of Captain Ingraham; and commissioned on 19 July 1941, Lieutenant Commander William M. Haynsworth, Jr., in command.

After shakedown and local operations along the East Coast, Ingraham commenced duties as a convoy escort in December 1941 as the Japanese attack on Pearl Harbor drew America into World War II. In 1942, she escorted convoys between the U.S., Iceland, and the United Kingdom, bringing supplies desperately needed by the Allies to stem Hitler's advance and to take the offensive. Under constant threat from German U-boats, Ingraham continued her escort duty to Europe and as far south as the Panama Canal.

Ingraham was guarding Scotland-bound convoy T-20 out of Halifax. After an erroneous report of enemy submarine, convoy escorts maneuvered to locate the enemy in heavy fog. On the night of 22 August, as she was investigating a collision between the destroyer Buck and a merchant vessel, Ingraham collided with the oil tanker Chemung in heavy fog off the coast of Nova Scotia and Ingraham sank almost immediately. Depth charges on her stern exploded. Only 11 men survived the collision. She was struck from the Naval Vessel Register on 11 September 1942.
