= USS Ingraham (DD-694) =

Allen M. Sumner-class destroyer

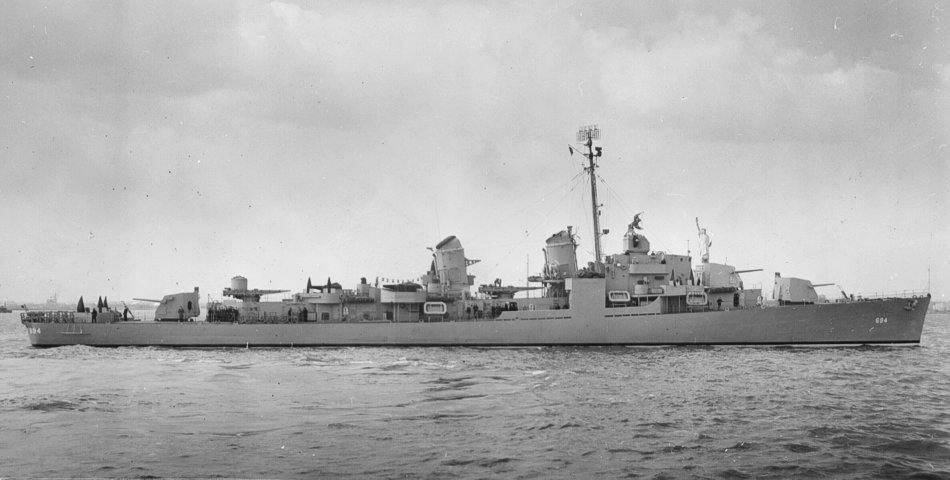
- USS Ingraham, 9 March 1944

History

United States
- Name: USS Ingraham
- Namesake: Duncan Ingraham
- Builder: Federal Shipbuilding and Drydock Company
- Laid down: 4 August 1943
- Launched: 16 January 1944
- Commissioned: 10 March 1944
- Decommissioned: 15 June 1971
- Stricken: 16 July 1971
- Identification: DD-694
- Fate: Sold to Greece 16 July 1971

Greece
- Name: Miaoulis
- Namesake: Andreas Vokos Miaoulis
- Acquired: 16 July 1971
- Stricken: 1992
- Identification: D211
- Fate: Sunk as target, 9 October 2001

General characteristics
- Class & type: Allen M. Sumner-class destroyer
- Displacement: 2,200 tons
- Length: 376 ft 6 in (114.76 m)
- Beam: 40 ft (12 m)
- Draft: 15 ft 8 in (4.78 m)
- Propulsion: 60,000 shp (45,000 kW); 2 propellers
- Speed: 34 knots (63 km/h; 39 mph)
- Range: 6,500 nautical miles (12,000 km; 7,500 mi) at 15 knots (28 km/h; 17 mph)
- Complement: 336
- Armament: 6 × 5 in (130 mm)/38 cal. guns; 12 × 40 mm AA guns, 11 × 20 mm AA guns, 10 × 21 inch (533 mm) torpedo tubes, 6 × depth charge projectors, 2 × depth charge tracks

USS Ingraham (DD-694) was a United States Navy Allen M. Sumner-class destroyer, the third ship in U.S. Navy history to be named for Duncan Ingraham. She was in commission from 1944 to 1971. Following her US service, she was sold to the Hellenic Navy and renamed Miaoulis. The ship was sunk as a target in 2001.

== Construction and commissioning ==
Ingraham was launched on 16 January 1944 by Federal Shipbuilding and Drydock Company, Kearny, New Jersey, sponsored by Mrs. George Ingraham Hutchinson, granddaughter of Duncan Ingraham, the ship's namesake, and commissioned on 10 March 1944.

== Service history ==
=== World War II ===
After shakedown in Bermuda and training out of Norfolk, Virginia, Ingraham sailed for duty with the United States Pacific Fleet, arriving at Eniwetok on 31 October 1944 in time to begin the final World War II Allied push against the Japanese toward the Japanese Home Islands.

In mid-November 1944, Ingraham commenced screening aircraft carriers during strikes on Luzon in the Philippine Islands in which considerable damage was done to the dwindling Imperial Japanese Navy and aircraft of the Imperial Japanese Navy and Imperial Japanese Army. Ingraham continued patrol and antisubmarine duty until 12 December 1944, when she departed for the assault and landings on Mindoro. On 15 December 1944, in company with destroyer Barton, she sank a Japanese cargo ship off the southwest tip of Mindoro.

After a brief stay, she departed San Pedro Bay on 2 January 1945, for operations in Lingayen Gulf. Arriving off the Gulf on 6 January 1945, she added her powerful anti-aircraft fire to that of the invasion fleet, and bombarded the shore targets behind the beaches. At the end of January 1945, Ingraham joined a fast carrier task force for strikes on the Japanese homeland. Following repairs at Saipan on 20 February 1945, she joined the invasion fleet off Iwo Jima on 23 February 1945, and provided accurate call fire for the United States Marines. On 21 March 1945 Ingraham took up radar picket duty in support of the Okinawa-Gunto operation. On 4 May 1945, she came under concerted air attack, and shot down four Japanese planes before a fifth crashed into her above the waterline on the port side, its bomb exploding in the generator room. With only one gun operative, and with 51 casualties aboard included in those numbers were 15 dead. Ingraham retired to Hunter's Point, California, for repairs. She was still in the United States when World War II ended on 15 August 1945.

=== Postwar and Korean War ===
After additional repairs, Ingraham operated along the United States West Coast until 7 May 1946 when she departed for the atomic bomb tests at Bikini Atoll. Those duties completed, Ingraham departed San Diego, California, on 24 February 1947 for the Far East. She engaged in various exercises and in late June 1947 arrived in Manila to act as official U.S. representative at the Philippine Independence anniversary. As part of the "Goodwill Tour" she also visited Guam, Melbourne and Sydney, Australia. The ship participated in a wreath laying ceremony at the site of the Battle of Coral Sea. She returned to San Diego on 8 October 1947. Ingraham operated along the California coast until 4 April 1949 when she departed San Diego for Norfolk, Virginia, arriving there on 20 April 1949. She participated in training exercises in the Atlantic Ocean until 24 November 1950, when she departed Norfolk for four months of duty with the United States Sixth Fleet in the Mediterranean. She commenced exercises in the Atlantic Ocean during the summer of 1951, then made another cruise to the Mediterranean during the fall of 1951 and summer of 1952.

Ingraham departed Norfolk 24 April 1953 to escort the aircraft carrier Lake Champlain to Japan via the Mediterranean and Suez Canal. She arrived at Yokosuka, Japan, on 9 June 1953 and later that month joined the aircraft carrier task force providing air support to United Nations forces in Korea during the Korean War. Her accuracy was excellent as she destroyed gun emplacements and supply areas.

=== Peacetime operations, 1953–1965 ===
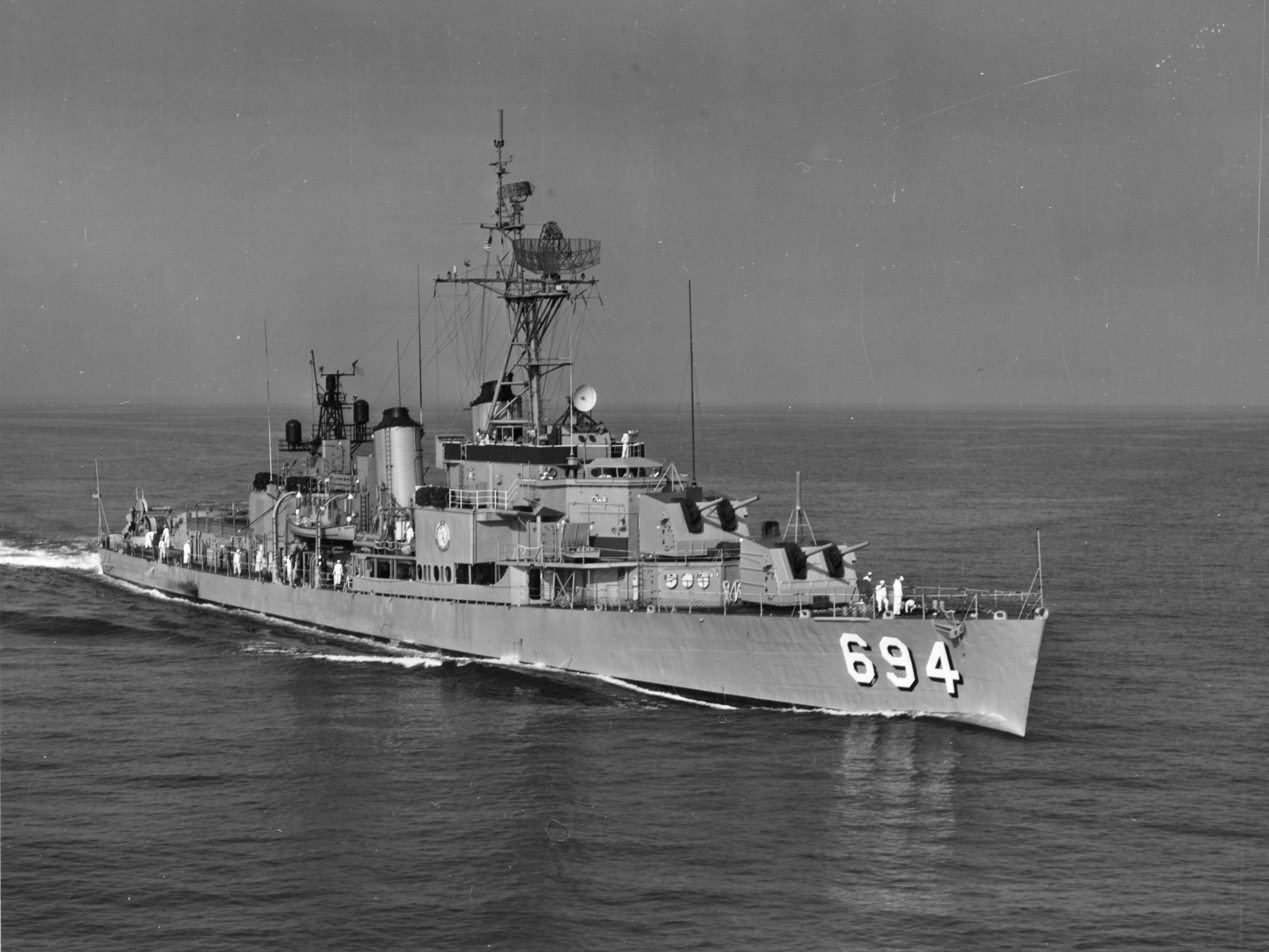
Ingraham underway in June 1962.

Following the armistice that ended the Korean War, Ingraham operated on security patrol before returning to Norfolk on 27 October 1953. During 1954 she operated on antisubmarine hunter-killer operations, cruised to South America, and participated in North Atlantic Treaty Organization (NATO) exercises out of Northern Ireland. She resumed training operations following overhaul in June 1955 and steamed on a summer training cruise to the Scandinavian countries, returning to Norfolk on 6 September 1955.

Ingraham departed Norfolk on 28 July 1956 for duty with the United States Sixth Fleet as trouble flared over the Suez Canal during the Suez Canal Crisis. She returned to Norfolk on 4 December 1956. She returned to Norfolk 4 December to begin a series of training cruises climaxed by a NATO exercise in September and October 1957.

Ingraham returned to Sixth Fleet duty in February 1958 and operated on patrol and exercises in the Mediterranean and the Red Sea. She returned to Norfolk, Virginia, on 2 July 1958 prior to the Lebanon crisis, in which the Sixth Fleet played a major role in the outcome in Lebanon. Ingraham then operated on the United States East Coast until 13 February 1959, when she departed for another tour with the Sixth Fleet, and during which a crisis with the Warsaw Pact over Berlin was averted. Departing the Mediterranean on 30 August 1959, she arrived at Norfolk Naval Shipyard at Portsmouth, Virginia, on 7 September 1959 and began overhaul.

During 1960, Ingraham engaged in operations out of Mayport, Florida, before embarking on another cruise with the Sixth Fleet, beginning late September 1960. She resumed readiness training out of Mayport in March 1961, before undergoing the extensive eight-month Fleet Rehabilitation and Modernization (FRAM) II-overhaul at Portsmouth, Virginia.

Ingraham arrived at her new home port, Newport, Rhode Island, on 23 February 1962, then engaged in fleet operations in the Atlantic and in the Caribbean. In September and October 1962 she was assigned to the recovery area for the Project Mercury flight of "Sigma 7" and under more somber conditions took part in the 1962 blockade of Cuba during the Cuban Missile Crisis, which ended in the removal of Soviet ballistic missiles from Cuba. She continued operations along the United States East Coast until 1 October 1963, when she sailed for another deployment to the Mediterranean. Regular deployment with the Atlantic Fleet occupied Ingraham's time until 29 September 1965.

=== Vietnam War ===
On 29 September 1965, Ingraham departed Newport for the Western Pacific and service in the Vietnam War, arriving on 31 October 1965 at Yokosuka, Japan. for resupply before operations in the South China Sea. Though acting as a part of the screen for the aircraft carrier Ticonderoga, she also performed fire support missions for ground troops ashore. On 12 November 1965, Ingraham steamed ten miles up the Saigon River in South Vietnam to bombard an enemy supply base, and, on 13 November 1965, shelled a Viet Cong assembly area some 300 miles (480 km) from the site of her action the previous day.

In early December 1965, Ingraham maintained regular surveillance on a Soviet submarine off China's Hainan Island, bordering the Gulf of Tonkin. From 1 January 1966 to 24 January, Ingraham operated with Task Force 77 off Vietnam. Ingraham left Vietnamese waters bound for Newport on 4 February 1966 by way of the Suez Canal.

=== End of service ===
Arriving on 8 April 1966 at Newport, Ingraham began a repair and training period. From 14 to 21 June 1966 she participated in Operation Beachtime, an amphibious landing in the Caribbean. Ingraham spent 28 October 1966 to 28 November 1966 preparing for service in the Mediterranean. On 8 December 1966 she arrived at Gibraltar. In late 1969 the destroyer sailed with the aircraft carrier USS Yorktown to various ports of call on the carrier's final tour of service. The destroyer again made a tour of European ports in the Mediterranean in late 1970 and early 1971. Ingraham was decommissioned on 15 June 1971 and sold to Greece on 16 July 1971.

== Greek Navy service, 1971–1992 ==
In Hellenic Navy service, the ship was renamed Miaoulis after a 19th-century Greek naval hero. In Greek service, Miaoulis initially operated an Aérospatiale Alouette III helicopter instead of the DASH drone helicopter used by the US Navy. She was modernized from November 1986, with the ship's variable-depth sonar removed, and an enlarged flight deck and a larger, telescoping hangar fitted to allow an Agusta-Bell AB-212 helicopter to be operated. was active in the Hellenic Navy until 1992, when she was decommissioned and struck from the active roster.

=== Final disposition ===
On 9 October 2001, Miaoulis was sunk as a target during a Greek naval exercise.

== Honors and awards ==
Ingraham received the Navy Unit Commendation for her action off Okinawa and four battle stars for service in World War II. She earned a fifth battle star for service in the Korean War.
