= USS Ingraham (DD-111) =

Wickes-class destroyer

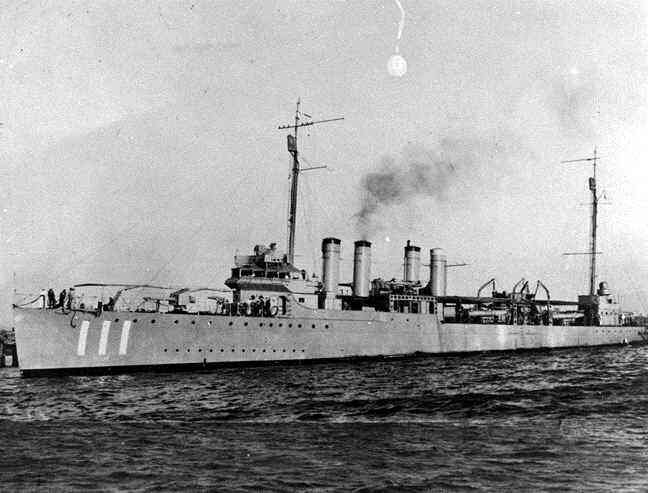
- USS Ingraham (DD-111)

History

United States
- Namesake: Duncan Nathaniel Ingraham
- Builder: Union Iron Works, San Francisco, California
- Laid down: 12 January 1918
- Launched: 4 July 1918
- Commissioned: 15 May 1919
- Decommissioned: 29 June 1922
- Reclassified: 17 July 1920, DM-9
- Stricken: 1 December 1936
- Fate: Sunk as target off Pearl Harbor 23 July 1937

General characteristics
- Class & type: Wickes-class destroyer
- Displacement: 1,202–1,208 long tons (1,221–1,227 t) (standard); 1,295–1,322 long tons (1,316–1,343 t) (deep load)
- Length: 314 ft 4 in (95.8 m)
- Beam: 30 ft 11 in (9.42 m)
- Draught: 9 ft 10 in (3.0 m)
- Installed power: 27,000 shp (20,000 kW); 4 water-tube boilers
- Propulsion: 2 shafts, 2 steam turbines
- Speed: 35 knots (65 km/h; 40 mph) (design)
- Range: 2,500 nautical miles (4,600 km; 2,900 mi) at 20 knots (37 km/h; 23 mph) (design)
- Complement: 6 officers, 108 enlisted men
- Armament: 4 × single 4-inch (102 mm) guns; 2 × single 1-pounder AA guns; 4 × triple 21 inch (533 mm) torpedo tubes; 2 × depth charge rails

USS Ingraham (DD-111) was a Wickes-class destroyer built for the United States Navy during World War I.

== Description ==
The Wickes class was an improved and faster version of the preceding Caldwell-class. Two different designs were prepared to the same specification that mainly differed in the turbines and boilers used. The ships built to the Bethlehem Steel design, built in the Fore River and Union Iron Works shipyards, mostly used Yarrow boilers that deteriorated badly during service and were mostly scrapped during the 1930s. The ships displaced 1,202–1,208 long tons (1,221–1,227 t) at standard load and 1,295–1,322 long tons (1,316–1,343 t) at deep load. They had an overall length of 314 feet 4 inches (95.8 m), a beam of 30 feet 11 inches (9.4 m) and a draught of 9 feet 10 inches (3.0 m). They had a crew of 6 officers and 108 enlisted men.

Performance differed radically between the ships of the class, often due to poor workmanship. The Wickes class was powered by two steam turbines, each driving one propeller shaft, using steam provided by four water-tube boilers. The turbines were designed to produce a total of 27,000 shaft horsepower (20,000 kW) intended to reach a speed of 35 knots (65 km/h; 40 mph). The ships carried 225 long tons (229 t) of fuel oil which was intended gave them a range of 2,500 nautical miles (4,600 km; 2,900 mi) at 20 knots (37 km/h; 23 mph).

The ships were armed with four 4-inch (102 mm) guns in single mounts and were fitted with two 1-pounder guns for anti-aircraft defense. Their primary weapon, though, was their torpedo battery of a dozen 21 inch (533 mm) torpedo tubes in four triple mounts. In many ships a shortage of 1-pounders caused them to be replaced by 3-inch (76 mm) anti-aircraft (AA) guns. They also carried a pair of depth charge rails. A "Y-gun" depth charge thrower was added to many ships.

== Construction and career ==
Ingraham, named for Duncan Nathaniel Ingraham, was launched 4 July 1918 by the Union Iron Works, San Francisco, California; sponsored by Mrs. Alfred S. Gann; and commissioned 15 May 1919. Ingraham departed 20 May for her shakedown cruise, transiting the Panama Canal and arriving Newport, Rhode Island 6 June. After repairs in New York, she sailed for a European tour of duty. While visiting Ostend, Belgium 22 September, she carried the King and Queen of Belgium to Calais, France. The destroyer returned to San Diego 8 January 1920 via New York and the Canal Zone to begin conversion to a minelayer.

Reclassified DM-9, Ingraham began minelaying exercises January 1921 along the California coast before departing Mare Island 7 June. She arrived at Pearl Harbor 18 June and engaged in operations there until she decommissioned at Pearl Harbor 29 June 1922. Her name was struck from the Navy List 1 December 1936 and she was sunk as target off Pearl Harbor on 23 July 1937.
