= USS Ingraham (FFG-61) =

American Oliver Hazard Perry-class guided missile frigate

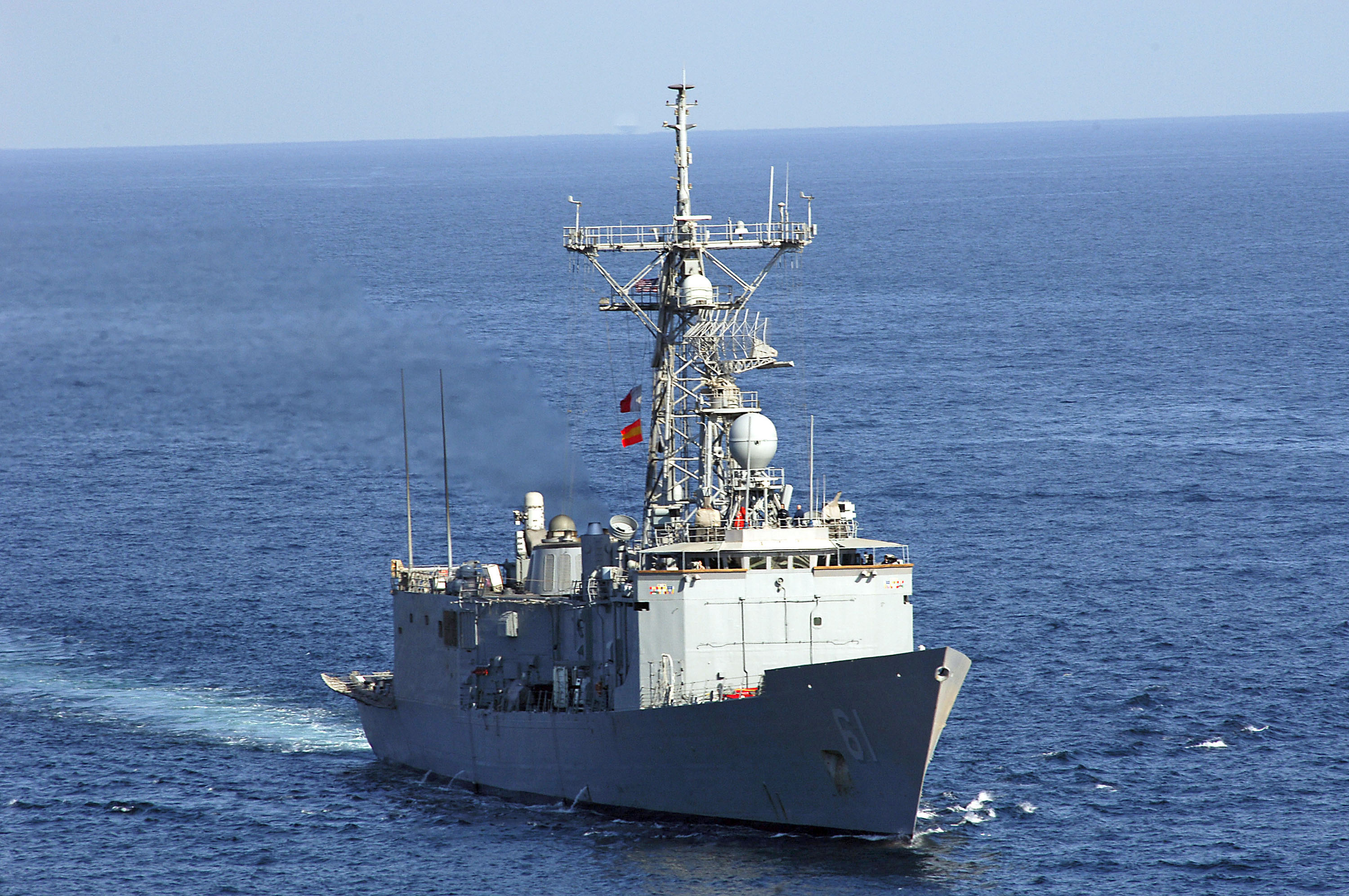
- USS Ingraham (FFG-61), in the Persian Gulf, 7 February 2008.

History

United States
- Name: Ingraham
- Namesake: Captain Duncan Ingraham
- Awarded: 28 November 1984
- Builder: Todd Pacific Shipyards, Los Angeles Division, San Pedro, California
- Laid down: 30 March 1987
- Launched: 25 June 1988
- Sponsored by: Mrs. Linda E. Carlson
- Commissioned: 5 August 1989
- Decommissioned: 30 January 2015
- Stricken: 30 January 2015
- Home port: NS Everett, Washington
- Identification: Hull symbol:FFG-61; Code letters:NDNI
- Motto: "Heritage of Gallantry"
- Nickname(s): The Ham; The Mighty "I"
- Fate: Sunk as a target 15 August 2021
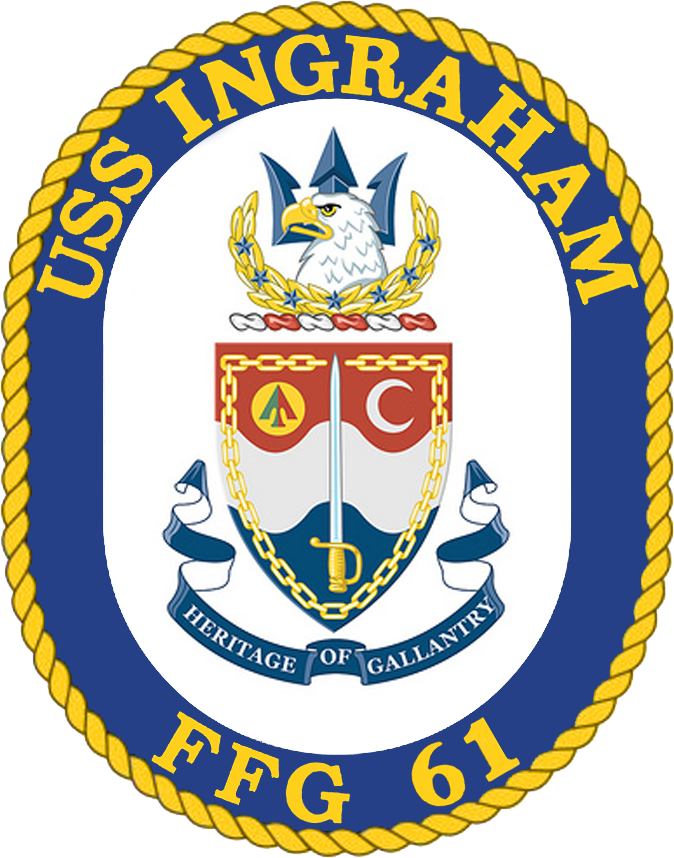
- Badge

General characteristics
- Class & type: Oliver Hazard Perry-class guided missile frigate
- Displacement: 4,100 long tons (4,200 t), full load
- Length: 453 feet (138 m), overall
- Beam: 45 feet (14 m)
- Draught: 22 feet (6.7 m)
- Propulsion: 2 × General Electric LM2500-30 gas turbines generating 41,000 shp (31 MW) through a single shaft and variable pitch propeller; 2 × Auxiliary Propulsion Units, 350 hp (260 kW) retractable electric azimuth thrusters for maneuvering and docking.
- Speed: over 29 knots (54 km/h)
- Range: 5,000 nautical miles at 18 knots (9,300 km at 33 km/h)
- Complement: 15 officers and 190 enlisted, plus SH-60 LAMPS detachment of roughly six officer pilots and 15 enlisted maintainers
- Sensors & processing systems: AN/SPS-49 air-search radar; AN/SPS-55 surface-search radar; CAS and STIR fire-control radar; AN/SQS-56 sonar.
- Electronic warfare & decoys: AN/SLQ-32
- Armament: As built: 1 × OTO Melara Mk 75 76 mm/62 caliber naval gun; 2 × Mk 32 triple-tube (324 mm) launchers for Mark 46 torpedoes; 1 × Vulcan Phalanx CIWS; 4 × .50-cal (12.7 mm) machine guns.; 1 × Mk 13 Mod 4 single-arm launcher for Harpoon anti-ship missiles and SM-1MR Standard anti-ship/air missiles (40 round magazine); Note: As of 2004, Mk 13 systems removed from all active US vessels of this class.
- Aircraft carried: 2 × SH-60 LAMPS III helicopters
- Aviation facilities: 2 × hangars; RAST helicopter hauldown system

USS Ingraham (FFG-61), the last American Oliver Hazard Perry-class guided missile frigate to be built, was the fourth ship of the United States Navy to be named for Captain Duncan Ingraham (1802–1891).

== Built in Los Angeles, California ==
Ingraham was laid down on 30 March 1987 at the Todd Pacific Shipyards, Los Angeles Division, San Pedro, California. She was launched on 25 June 1988; sponsored by Mrs. Linda E. Carlson, wife of Vice Admiral Dudley L. Carlson, Chief of Naval Personnel; and commissioned on 5 August 1989. Ingraham was decommissioned on 30 January 2015.

Prior to decommissioning, Ingraham was commanded by Commander Dan Straub. Ingraham's former homeport is at NS Everett, Washington, and was assigned to Destroyer Squadron 9.

== Service history ==
=== Operation Fiery Vigil ===
Mount Pinatubo, a volcano located on Luzon in the Philippines, erupted on 12 June 1991. The mountain's fury blackened the skies across Angeles City and much of Luzon for nearly 36 hours. Typhoon Yunya added to the devastation when it slammed inland with fierce winds and rain. The rain eventually cleared the atmosphere of most of the choking and blinding ash, but the disaster deposited a heavy eight-inch coating of grey ash over much of the area around Naval Station (NS) Subic Bay and Naval Air Station (NAS) Cubi Point. Sailors observed that the residue gave the landscape the appearance of dry cement. The ash crushed many lightweight structures, and a chalky film covered the bay, which presented the appearance of a translucent shade of green. The disaster cut electricity and water to the base for two days, and only heavy trucks could grind their way through the morass to reach victims. Rescue workers also contended with aftershocks. The volcanic eruption and the typhoon killed more than 300 people and displaced more than 300,000 victims.

Aircraft carriers Abraham Lincoln and Midway, together with Ingraham and ships from Amphibious Readiness Group Alpha, led by amphibious assault ship Peleliu, participated in Operation Fiery Vigil, the evacuation of those displaced by the disaster. Abraham Lincoln transported 4,323 people, primarily USN and USAF dependents, from Subic Bay, Cubi Point, and Clark Air Base to Cebu City, Cebu, for further evacuation to Guam and the continental U.S.

Abraham Lincoln sailed more than 1,800 nautical miles (2,100 mi; 3,300 km) through inshore waters during Fiery Vigil. This voyage required careful attention to detail from her Navigation Department because of the myriad of other vessels, treacherous shoals, and currents. The carrier also supported Lake Champlain while the guided missile cruiser evacuated a further 844 people and their pets during three trips in and out of the disaster area. Lake Champlain's historian noted that the devastation and the suffering of the victims "overwhelmed" her crewmen. Additional squadrons that assisted humanitarian efforts included Strike Fighter Squadron (VFA) 94, Composite Squadron (VC) 5, and Helicopter Anti-Submarine Squadron Light (HSL) 47.

=== January 2008 Iranian incident ===
Sailors on board guided missile destroyer Hopper reported seeing IT2 Menelek Brown of the ships company at 0430 on 3 January 2008, but Menelek failed to muster at 0730 that morning, while the ship was carrying out maritime security operations in the Arabian Sea. Crewmembers unsuccessfully searched the destroyer for their shipmate, and Hopper sounded "man overboard." At 1505 the ship commenced a coordinated search of the surrounding area with guided missile cruiser Port Royal as well as the frigate Ingraham. A Lockheed P-3C Orion assisted the ships as they conducted an "expanding square" search from the position 18°26′21″N 63°53′35″E, but they ended their search the following day without finding Brown.

On 6 January 2008, Hopper, Port Royal, and Ingraham were entering the Persian Gulf through the Strait of Hormuz when five Iranian motor boats approached them at high speed and in a reportedly threatening manner. The American ships had been in the Arabian Sea searching for a sailor who had been missing for one day. The U.S. Navy reported that the Iranian boats made "threatening" moves toward the U.S. vessels, coming as close as 200 yards (180 m). The U.S. Navy ships received a radio transmission saying, "I am coming to you. You will explode after few minutes." While the American ships prepared to open fire, the Iranians abruptly turned away, the U.S. Navy officials said. Before leaving, the Iranians dropped white boxes into the water in front of the American ships. The American ships did not investigate the boxes. Officials from the two countries differed on their assessments of the severity of the incident. The Iranians claimed that they were conducting normal maneuvers, whereas American officials claimed that an imminent danger to American naval vessels existed.

=== September 2009 Samoa earthquake and tsunami ===
On 29 September 2009, Ingraham was en route to American Samoa and was the first U.S. military asset to arrive and assist in the recovery efforts following the earthquake and tsunami.

=== Final deployment ===
Ingraham was responsible for the capture of nine drug smuggling vessels, apprehension of 29 suspects, and 11,937 kg of cocaine valued at $561M. Additionally, while deployed, Ingraham participated in UNITAS, SIFOREX, & played a critical role in United States Fourth Fleet Theater Security Cooperation activities.

==== Combating Transnational Organized Crime & Operation Martillo ====
From March to October 2014, Ingraham conducted a Combating-Transnational Organized Crime deployment in support of Operation Martillo, during which Ingraham conducted 32 Right of Approach visits, 11 vessel boardings, 6 Airborne Use of Force actions, and 17 detainee transfers. The ship also conducted 278 flight operations encompassing 983 mishap-free flight hours and a 98 percent sortie completion rate. Ingraham's effective coordination and employment of maritime, aerial, and land-based assets in support of Combating Transnational Organized Crime operations and Operation Martillo resulted in the interdiction or disruption of illegal contraband including more than 11,937 kg of cocaine, worth more than $560 million, detention of 29 suspects, and the successful capture of a self-propelled semi-submersible vessel (SPSS) with its crew and 2,383 kg of narcotics, the first such vessel ever captured in the Eastern Pacific.

==== UNITAS & SIFOREX ====
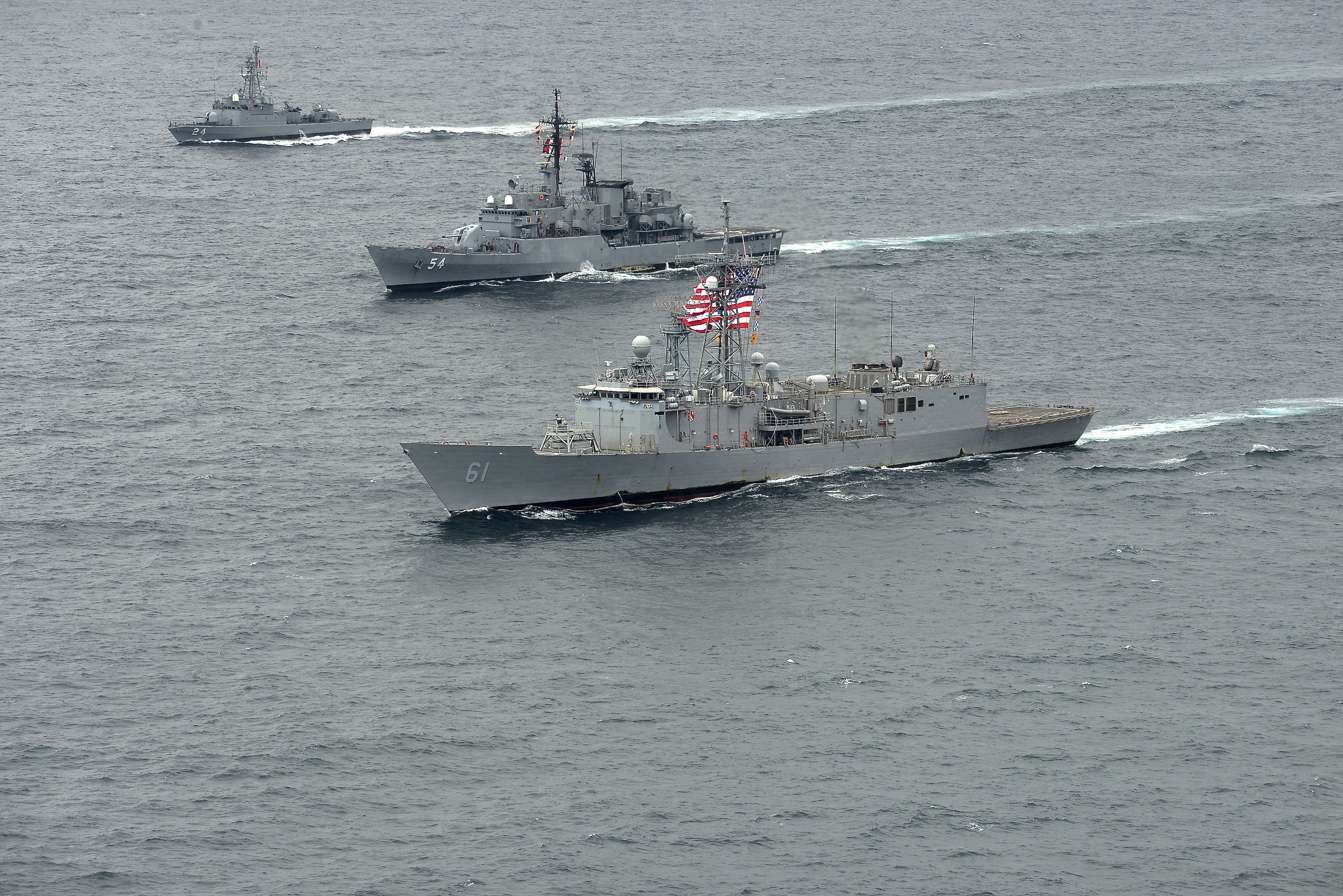
USS Ingraham with BAP Mariátegui and BAP Herrera during UNITAS, 16 September 2014

In September Ingraham was extended in theater as the only U.S. Navy warship to participate in the 55th evolution of Exercise UNITAS in Peru, significantly enhancing relationships with 15 partner nations. She also participated in the Silent Forces Exercise working with partner nations on anti-submarine warfare and detection training in a multinational environment. Ingraham returned from her 7 1/2-month deployment on 30 October 2014.

== Decommissioning ==
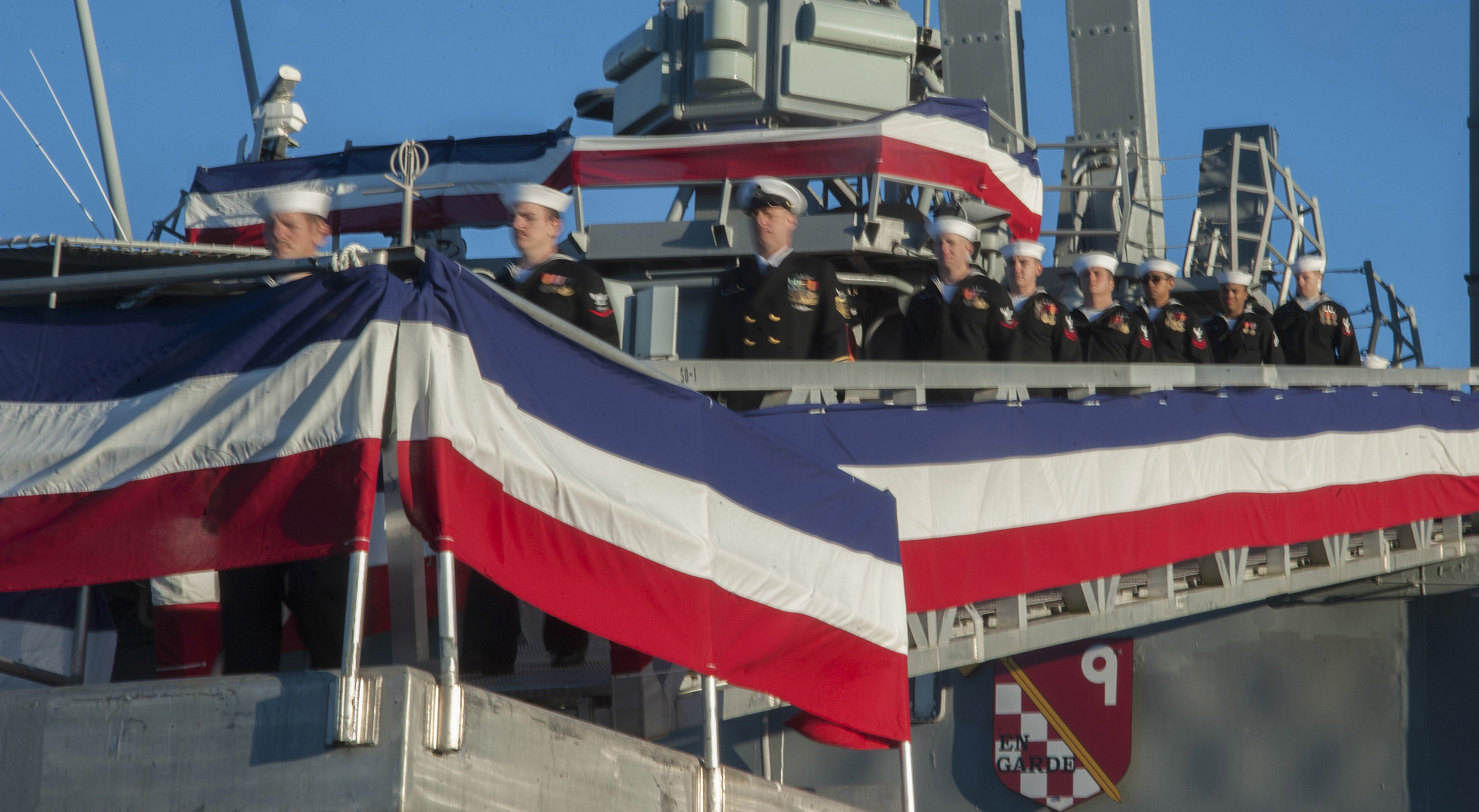
Sailors depart USS Ingraham for the last time on 12 November 2014

After returning from her final deployment in October 2014, Ingraham was ceremonially decommissioned on 12 November 2014 at Naval Station Everett. Ingraham was officially decommissioned on 30 January 2015 at NS Everett, and was berthed at the Naval Sea Systems Command (NavSea) Inactive Ships On-site Maintenance Office at Naval Shipyard Bremerton, pending her disposal.

=== Final disposition ===
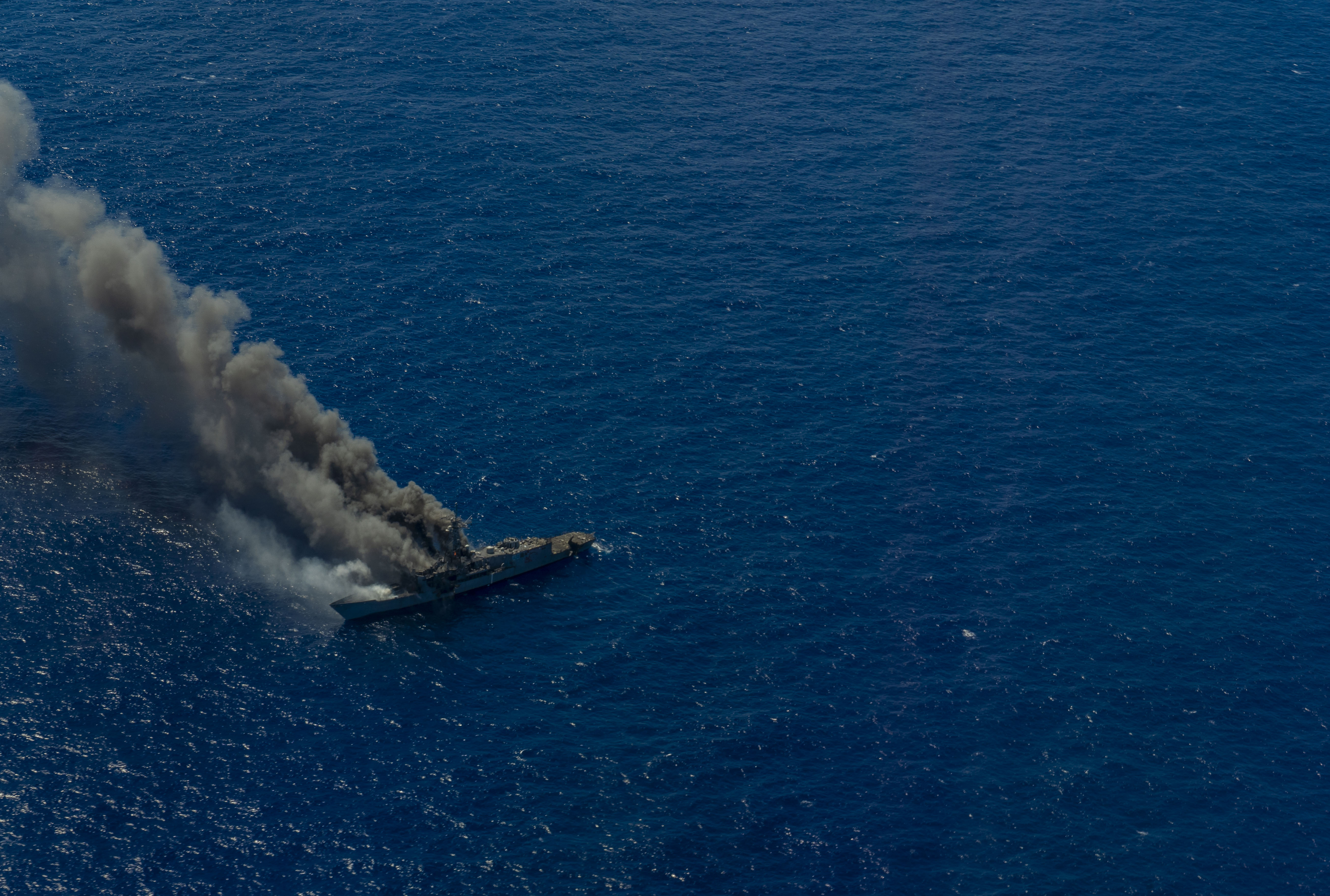
Smoke billows from the decommissioned guided missile frigate ex-USS Ingraham during a sinking exercise in the Pacific

On 15 August 2021, Ingraham was used as a target for a Sinking Exercise (SINKEX) near Hawaii as part of Large Scale Exercise (LSE) 2021. Units from the Carl Vinson Carrier Strike Group, Submarine Forces Pacific, I Marine Expeditionary Force, 3rd Marine Air Wing, III Marine Expeditionary Force, 3rd Marine Division, and U.S. Army Multi-Domain Task Force were involved. The Marine Corps fired two Naval Strike Missiles from a Rogue Fires autonomous vehicle on the shore, which navigated around simulated mountains, and hit the Ingraham hull.

== See also ==
- United States-Iran relations
