= USS Chemung (AO-30) =

Oiler of the United States Navy

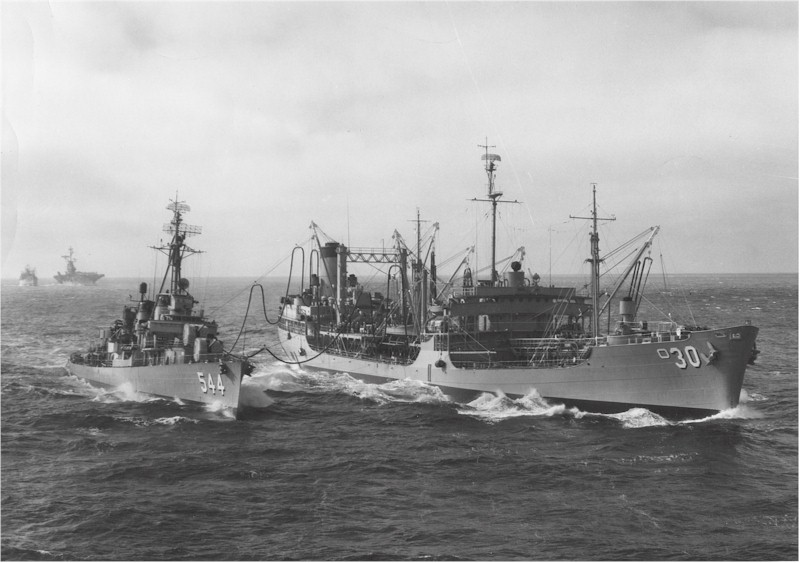
- USS Chemung, right, refueling the destroyer USS Boyd (DD-544) on 11 April 1962.

History

United States
- Name: USS Chemung
- Namesake: Chemung River in New York
- Builder: Bethlehem Shipbuilding Corporation, Sparrows Point, Maryland
- Launched: 9 September 1939
- Sponsored by: Miss Howard
- Acquired: 5 June 1941
- Commissioned: 3 July 1941
- Decommissioned: 3 July 1950
- Recommissioned: 1 December 1950
- Decommissioned: 18 September 1970
- Stricken: May 1971
- Fate: Scrapped May 1971

General characteristics
- Class & type: Cimarron-class replenishment oiler
- Displacement: 7,470 long tons (7,590 t) light; 24,830 long tons (25,228 t) full load
- Length: 553 ft (169 m)
- Beam: 75 ft (23 m)
- Draft: 32 ft 4 in (9.86 m)
- Propulsion: Twin screws, 30,400 shp (22,669 kW); Steam (600psi), NSFO
- Speed: 18 knots (21 mph; 33 km/h)
- Complement: 304
- Armament: 4 × 5 in (130 mm)/38 cal. guns (4×1); 4 × 40 mm AA guns; 4 × 20 mm AA guns

Service record
- Operations: World War II, Korean War, Vietnam War
- Awards: 2 battle stars (World War II); 4 battle stars (Korea)

USS Chemung (AO-30), a United States Navy Cimarron-class fleet replenishment oiler. She was the second ship named for the Chemung River in New York.

== Construction and commissioning ==
Chemung was launched on 9 September 1939 as Esso Annapolis by Bethlehem Shipbuilding Corporation at Bethlehem Sparrows Point Shipyard, Sparrows Point, Maryland, under a Maritime Commission contract, sponsored by Miss Howard. The United States Navy acquired the ship on 5 June 1941 and commissioned her on 3 July 1941.

== Service history ==
=== Pre-World War II ===
From 13 July 1941 until the United States entered World War II in December 1941, Chemung operated between United States East Coast ports and the oil ports of Texas and Louisiana, transporting fuel oil.

=== World War II ===
The United States entered World War II with the Japanese attack on Pearl Harbor on 7 December 1941. From 20 December 1941 to 3 January 1942 she issued fuel at Naval Station Argentia, Newfoundland. After reloading at Norfolk, Virginia, she departed on 19 February 1942 and steamed to Hvalfjörður, Iceland, carrying fuel oil. After serving as fuel station ship at Hvalfjörður, she returned to Norfolk on 25 March 1942, then operated between Norfolk and ports in the Gulf of Mexico from 1 April to 16 May 1942. Following another tour as fuel station ship at Hvalfjörður from 30 May to 26 June 1942, Chemung departed New York City on 20 August 1942 in a convoy bound for the United Kingdom. During the voyage, the destroyer USS Ingraham (DD-444) collided with her at night on 22 August. Ingraham sank almost immediately when the depth charges on her stern exploded. Chemung, although heavily damaged by the explosion and resulting fires, reached Boston, Massachusetts, on 26 August 1942 for repairs.

Getting underway on 1 October 1942, Chemung steamed to Beaumont, Texas, to load fuel oil, then accompanied the Operation Torch assault force to sea, remaining off the coast of French Morocco during the amphibious landings in North Africa. Shen returned to Norfolk on 30 November 1942 to resume fuel runs along the coast of the United States. Between 15 February 1943 and 11 June 1945, Chemung made five voyages in convoy to ports in the United Kingdom and five to North Africa, alternating them with cargo duty along the coast of the United States and in the Caribbean and fuel station ship duty at Bermuda and in the Azores. The war in Europe ended on 8 May 1945.

With the Pacific campaign still underway, Chemung received an assignment to duty in East Asia. She departed Norfolk on 18 July 1945 and passed through the Panama Canal into the Pacific Ocean. Hostilities with Japan ended on 15 August 1945 and Japan formally surrendered on 2 September 1945, bringing World War II to an end.

=== 1945–1950 ===
Chemung served at Okinawa on occupation duty from 17 September to 13 October 1945, then returned by way of the Cape of Good Hope to Norfolk on 6 December 1945, completing a circumnavigation of the globe. She operated with the United States Atlantic Fleet, serving in the United States Sixth Fleet in the Mediterranean from 12 November 1948 to 1 April 1949). On 17& March 1950 she departed for San Diego, California, where she was decommissioned and placed in reserve on 3 July 1950, the ninth anniversary of her commissioning.

=== Korean War ===
The Korean War began with North Korea's invasion of South Korea on 25 June 1950. Recommissioned on 1 December 1950, Chemung departed for East Asia on 28 January 1951 for a brief tour refueling forces fighting in the Korean War. During her second tour of duty from 7 July 1951 to 20 April 1952, she supported United Nations troops in Korea, served on the Formosa Patrol, and then transported oil from Ras Tanura, Saudi Arabia, to Guam. She departed San Pedro, California, on 24 June 1952 for another tour supporting the United States Seventh Fleet off Korea, then arrived at Mare Island Naval Shipyard in California on 24 February 1953 for an overhaul. Hostilities in the Korean War ended in a ceasefire on 27 July 1953.

=== 1953–1971 ===
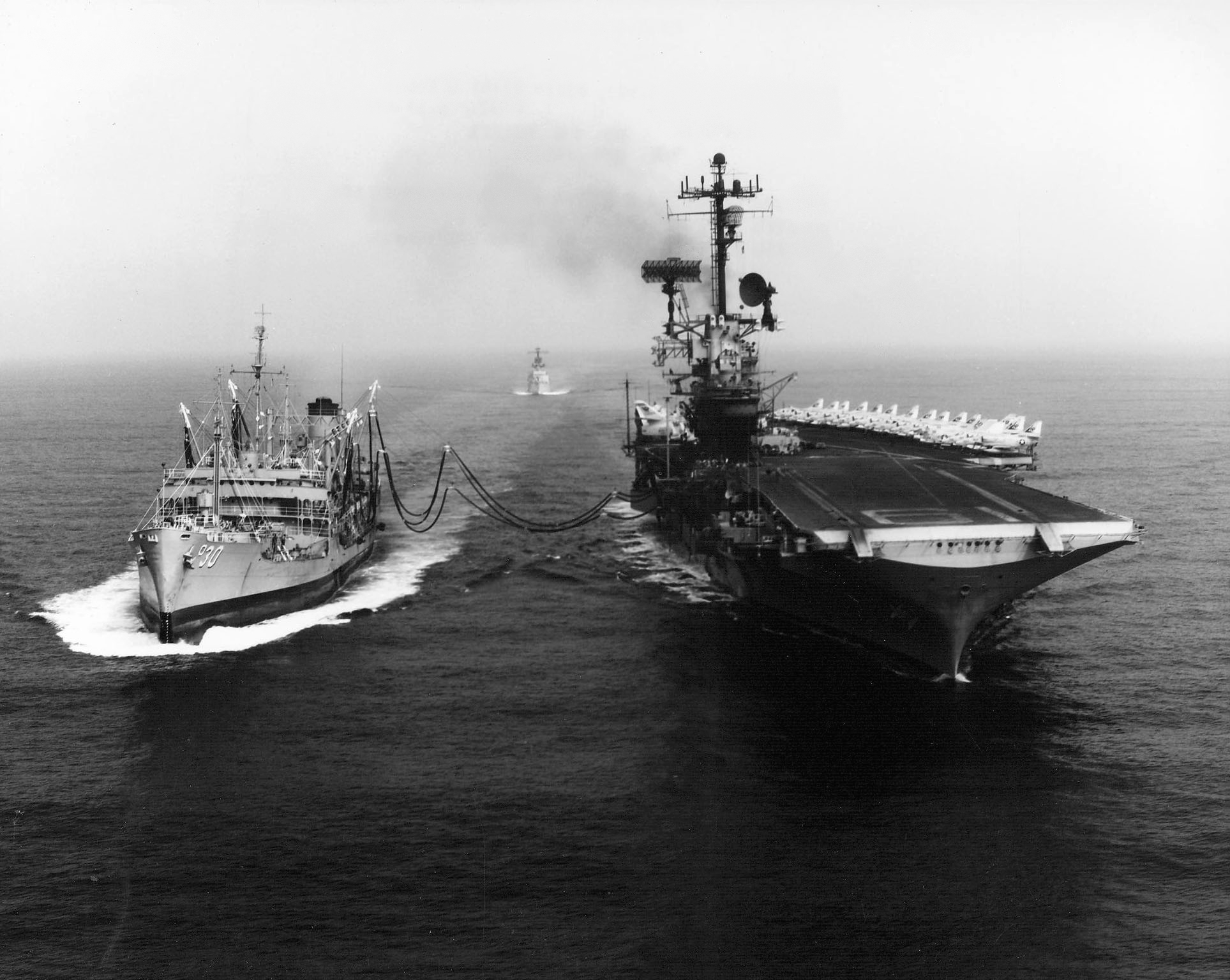
USS Chemung refueling USS Hancock, 2 July 1969

In nine succeeding tours of duty in the Western Pacific from her home port at San Pedro between 1953 and 1960, Chemung supported many of the Seventh Fleet's most notable operations in East Asia. During her 1954–1955 tour she provided fuel for the ships carrying out the evacuation of the Tachen Islands. During each of the tours she served as station tanker at Kaohsiung, Taiwan, fueling the ships of the Taiwan Patrol.

Chemung served through the 1960s, including service during the Vietnam War, until she was decommissioned on 18 September 1970. She was transferred to the Maritime Administration and scrapped in May 1971.

== Awards ==
- China Service Medal
- American Defense Service Medal with fleet clasp
- American Campaign Medal
- European–African–Middle Eastern Campaign Medal with two battle stars
- Asiatic-Pacific Campaign Medal
- World War II Victory Medal
- Navy Occupation Service Medal (with "ASIA" clasp)
- National Defense Service Medal
- Korean Service Medal with eight battle stars
- Armed Forces Expeditionary Medal (four awards)
- Vietnam Service Medal with seven service stars
- United Nations Service Medal (United Nations)
- Vietnam Campaign Medal (Republic of Vietnam)
- Korean War Service Medal (Republic of Korea)
