= Duncan Ingraham =

American Navy officer

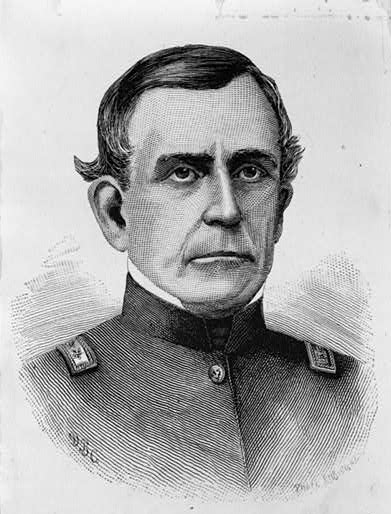
- Born: Duncan Nathaniel Ingraham; December 6, 1802; Charleston, South Carolina, U.S.
- Died: October 16, 1891 (aged 88); Charleston, South Carolina, U.S.
- Military career
- Allegiance: Confederate States
- Branch: United States Navy; Confederate Navy
- Service years: 1812–1861
- Rank: Captain
- Commands: Sloop-of-war
- Conflicts: American Civil War
- Awards: Congressional Gold Medal

Duncan Nathaniel Ingraham (6 December 1802 – 16 October 1891) was a United States Navy officer who later joined the Confederate States Navy.

== U.S. Navy ==
A native of Charleston, South Carolina, Ingraham was appointed midshipman in the U.S. Navy on 18 June 1812 at the age of 10. Ingraham was commissioned captain after years of distinguished service on 14 September 1855. While in command of the sloop-of-war St. Louis in the Mediterranean, in July 1853, Ingraham interfered with the detention by the Austrian consul at Smyrna (İzmir, Turkey) of Martin Koszta, a Hungarian who had declared in New York his intention of becoming an American citizen, and, who had been seized and confined in the Austrian ship Hussar. For his conduct in this matter, Ingraham was voted thanks and a Gold Medal by Congress.

Ingraham served as Chief of the Bureau of Ordnance and Hydrographer of the Navy from 1856 until 1860.

== Confederate States Navy ==
Ingraham resigned from the U.S. Navy on 4 February 1861 to join the Confederate States Navy as a captain. Ingraham was Chief of the Ordnance Bureau from 1861 to 1863 and Commandant of the Charleston naval station from 1862 to 1865.

Ingraham died at Charleston on 16 October 1891.

== Personal life ==
Ingraham's father, Nathaniel Ingraham, had also served in the U.S. Navy; he had served on John Paul Jones's ship during his famous encounter with the Serapis. Duncan married Harriet, a granddaughter of Henry Laurens.

Duncan Ingraham enslaved people.

Ingraham is mentioned repeatedly in Mary Boykin Chestnut's Confederate era diary. “He is South Carolina to the tips of his fingers; yet he has it dyed in the wool—it is part of his nature—to believe the United States Navy can whip anything in the world.” Chesnut, Mary Boykin (2019). Mary Chesnut's Diary. Digireads.com. ISBN 978-1-4209-4978-0.

== Legacy ==
Four ships of the U.S. Navy have been named USS Ingraham.

Ingraham Street in Bushwick, Brooklyn is probably named after him.
