= List of sunken U.S. Navy ships =

The United States Navy has lost the following ships from its inception in 1775 as the Continental Navy in the American Revolutionary War. The navy has since been involved in several wars but saw its most significant losses during the American Civil War and World War II. Navy ships have also been sunk in accidents and test purposes in that time and several have been used as target ships in sinking exercises.

== Fleet carriers ==
Sunk in combat or supporting combat operations
Ship	Year of sinking	Photo	Year of commission
USS Langley	1942	USS Langley	1922
USS Lexington	1942	USS Lexington	1927
USS Yorktown	1942	USS Yorktown	1937
USS Wasp	1942	USS Wasp	1940
USS Hornet	1942	USS Hornet	1941
USS Princeton	1944	USS Princeton	1943

Sunk during testing
Ship	Year of sinking	Photo	Year of commission
USS Saratoga	1946	USS Saratoga	1927
USS Independence	1946	USS Independence	1943
USS America	2005	USS America	1965

== Escort or 'fast' carriers ==
Sunk during combat or supporting combat operations
Ship	Year of sinking	Photo	Year of commission
USS Gambier Bay	1944	USS Gambier Bay	1943
USS Block Island	1944	USS Block Island	1943
USS Bismarck Sea	1945	USS Bismarck Sea	1943
USS St. Lo	1944	USS St. Lo	1943
USS Liscome Bay	1943	USS Liscome Bay	1943
USS Ommaney Bay	1945	USS Ommaney Bay off the coast of Hawaii in 1944.	1944

== Battleships ==
Sunk in combat or supporting combat operations
Ship	Year of sinking	Photo	Year of commission
USS Utah	1941	USS Utah	1911
USS Arizona	1941	USS Arizona	1916

Sunk during testing
Ship	Year of sinking	Photo	Year of commission
USS Texas	1912	USS Texas	1895
USS Indiana	1920	USS Indiana	1895
USS Iowa	1923	USS Iowa	1897
USS Alabama	1921	USS Alabama	1900
USS Virginia	1923	USS Virginia	1906
USS New Jersey	1923	USS New Jersey	1906
USS Arkansas	1946	USS Arkansas	1912
USS New York	1948	USS New York	1914
USS Nevada	1948	USS Nevada	1916
USS Pennsylvania	1948	USS Pennsylvania	1916

Sunk in an accident
Ship	Year of sinking	Photo	Year of commission
USS Oklahoma	1947	USS Oklahoma	1916

== Submarines ==
From Combat or Supporting Combat Operations
Ship	Year of Sinking	Photo	Year of Commission
USS S-44	1943	USS S-44	1925
USS Argonaut (SM-1)	1943	USS Argonaut (SS-166)	1928
USS Shark (SS-174)	1942	USS Shark (SS-174)	1936
USS Perch (SS-176)	1942	USS Perch (SS-176)	1936
USS Pickerel (SS-177)	1943	USS Pickerel (SS-177)	1937
USS Pompano (SS-181)	1943	USS Pompano (SS-181)	1937
USS Sculpin (SS-191)	1943	USS Sculpin (SS-191)	1939
USS Sealion (SS-195)	1941	USS Sealion (SS-195)	1939
USS Swordfish (SS-193)	1945	USS Swordfish (SS-193)	1939
USS Triton (SS-201)	1943	USS Triton (SS-201)	1940
USS Trout (SS-202)	1944	USS Trout (SS-202)	1940
USS Grayling (SS-209)	1943	USS Grayling (SS-209)	1941
USS Grampus (SS-207)	1943	USS Grampus (SS-207)	1941
USS Gudgeon (SS-211)	1944	USS Gudgeon (SS-211)	1941
USS Grenadier (SS-210)	1943	USS Grenadier (SS-210)	1941
USS Grayback (SS-208)	1944	USS Grayback (SS-208)	1941
USS Trigger (SS-237)	1945	USS Trigger (SS-237)	1942
USS Growler (SS-215)	1944	USS Growler (SS-215)	1942
USS Wahoo (SS-238)	1943	USS Wahoo (SS-238)	1942
USS Grunion (SS-216)	1942	USS Grunion (SS-216)	1942
USS Amberjack (SS-219)	1943	USS Amberjack (SS-219)	1942
USS Albacore (SS-218)	1944	USS Albacore (SS-218)	1942
USS Herring (SS-233)	1944	USS Herring (SS-233)	1942
USS Harder (SS-257)	1944	USS Harder (SS-257)	1942
USS Scamp (SS-277)	1945	USS Scamp (SS-277)	1942
USS Scorpion (SS-278)	1944	USS Scorpion (SS-278)	1942
USS Snook (SS-279)	1945	USS Snook (SS-279)	1942
USS Bonefish (SS-223)	1945	USS Bonefish (SS-223)	1943
USS Corvina (SS-226)	1943	USS Corvina (SS-226)	1943
USS Darter (SS-227)	1944	USS Darter (SS-227)	1943
USS Flier (SS-250)	1944	USS Flier (SS-250)	1943
USS Robalo (SS-273)	1944	USS Robalo (SS-273)	1943
USS Runner (SS-275)	1944	USS Runner (SS-275)	1943
USS Escolar (SS-294)	1944	USS Escolar (SS-294)	1943
USS Capelin (SS-289)	1943	USS Capelin (SS-289)	1943
USS Cisco (SS-290)	1943	USS Cisco (SS-290)	1943
USS Shark (SS-314)	1944	USS Shark (SS-314)	1943
USS Golet (SS-361)	1944	USS Golet (SS-361)	1943
USS Barbel (SS-316)	1945	No image available	1944
USS Bullhead (SS-332)	1945	USS Bullhead (SS-332)	1944
USS Kete (SS-369)	1945	USS Kete (SS-369)	1944
USS Lagarto (SS-371)	1945	USS Lagarto (SS-371)	1944

From Testing
Ship	Year of Sinking	Photo	Year of Commission
USS Moccasin (SS-5)	1919	USS Moccasin (SS-5)	1901
USS Pike (SS-6)	1922	USS Pike (SS-6)	1903
USS Adder	1922	USS Adder	1903
USS Shark (SS-8)	1921	USS Shark (SS-8) (The Shark ^{is the one to the right.)}	1903
USS Porpoise (SS-7)	1922	USS Porpoise (SS-7) (It is the submarine to the left.)	1903
USS Grampus (SS-4)	1922	USS Grampus (SS-4)	1903
USS B-3 (Tarantula)	1922	USS B-3 (Tarantula)	1907
USS B-1 (Viper)	1921	USS B-1 (Viper)	1907
USS B-2 (Cuttlefish)	1922	USS B-2 (Cuttlefish)	1907
USS G-1 (Seal)	1921	USS G-1 (Seal)	1912
USS L-8	1926	No image available	1917
USS R-8	1931	USS R-8	1919
USS S-16	1945	No image available	1920
USS S-17	1945	USS S-17	1921
USS S-49	1941	No image available	1922
USS S-35	1946	USS S-35	1922
USS S-38	1945	USS S-38	1923
USS Bass (SS-164)	1945	USS Bass (SS-164)	1925
USS Skipjack (SS-184)	1948	USS Skipjack (SS-184)	1938
USS Searaven (SS-196)	1948	USS Searaven (SS-196)	1939
USS Tuna (SS-203)	1948	USS Tuna (SS-203)	1941
USS Guardfish (SS-217)	1961	USS Guardfish (SS-217)	1942
USS Tinosa (SS-283)	1960	USS Tinosa (SS-283)	1942
USS Aspro (SS-309)	1962	USS Aspro (SS-309)	1943
USS Archerfish (SS-311)	1968	USS Archerfish (SS-311)	1943
USS Balao (SS-285)	1963	USS Balao (SS-285)	1943
USS Bashaw (SS-241)	1972	USS Bashaw (SS-241)	1943
USS Apogon (SS-308)	1946	USS Apogon (SS-308)	1943
USS Skate (SS-305)	1948	USS Skate (SS-305)	1943
USS Guavina (SS-362)	1967	USS Guavina (SS-362)	1943
USS Pilotfish (SS-386)	1946	USS Pilotfish (SS-386)	1943
USS Devilfish (SS-292)	1968	USS Devilfish (SS-292)	1944
USS Dragonet (SS-293)	1961	USS Dragonet (SS-293)	1944
USS Sterlet (SS-392)	1969	USS Sterlet (SS-392)	1944
USS Queenfish (SS-393)	1963	USS Queenfish (SS-393)	1944
USS Redfish (SS-395)	1969	USS Redfish (SS-395)	1944
USS Trepang (SS-412)	1969	USS Trepang (SS-412)	1944
USS Segundo (SS-398)	1970	USS Segundo (SS-398)	1944
USS Sea Devil (SS-400)	1964	USS Sea Devil (SS-400)	1944
USS Spikefish (SS-404)	1964	USS Spikefish (SS-404)	1944
USS Manta (SS-299)	1969	USS Manta (SS-299)	1944
USS Sealion (SS-315)	1978	USS Sealion (SS-315)	1944
USS Tigrone (SS-419)	1976	USS Tigrone (SS-419)	1944
USS Blackfin (SS-322)	1973	USS Blackfin (SS-322)	1944
USS Barbero (SS-317)	1964	USS Barbero (SS-317)	1944
USS Moray (SS-300)	1970	USS Moray (SS-300)	1945
USS Sabalo (SS-302)	1973	USS Sabalo (SS-302)	1945
USS Carbonero (SS-337)	1975	USS Carbonero (SS-337)	1945
USS Tiru (SS-416)	1979	USS Tiru (SS-416)	1948
USS Mackerel (SST-1)	1978	USS Mackerel (SST-1)	1953

From Accidents
Ship	Year of Sinking	Photo	Year of Commission
USS Alligator (1862)	1863	USS Alligator (1862)	1862
USS F-1	1917	USS F-1	1912
USS F-4 (Skate)	1915	USS F-4 (Skate)	1913
USS G-2 (Tuna)	1919	No image available	1913
USS H-1 (Seawolf)	1920	USS H-1 (Seawolf)	1913
USS O-5	1923	No image available	1918
USS O-9	1941	USS O-9	1918
USS R-12	1943	USS R-12 (SS-89)	1919
USS S-4	1927	No image available	1919
USS S-5	1920	USS S-5	1920
USS S-51	1925	USS S-51	1922
USS S-26	1942	No Image Available	1923
USS S-28	1944	No Image Available	1923
USS S-36	1942	No Image Available	1923
USS S-37	1945	USS S-37	1923
USS S-39	1942	No Image Available	1923
USS S-27	1942	USS S-27	1924
USS Tarpon (SS-175)	1957	No image available	1936
USS Seawolf (SS-197)	1944	USS Seawolf (SS-197)	1939
USS Dorado (SS-248)	1943	No image available	1943
USS Tullibee (SS-284)	1944	USS Tullibee (SS-284)	1943
USS Tang (SS-306)	1944	USS Tang (SS-306)	1943
USS Bugara (SS-331)	1971	USS Bugara (SS-331)	1944
USS Chopper (SS-342)	1976	USS Chopper (SS-342)	1945
USS Cochino (SS-345)	1949	USS Cochino (SS-345)	1945
USS Stickleback (SS-415)	1958	USS Stickleback (SS-415)	1945
USS Scorpion (SSN-589)	1968	USS Scorpion (SSN-589)	1959
USS Thresher (SSN-593)	1963	USS Thresher (SSN-593)	1961

== Cruisers ==
From Combat or Supporting Combat Operations
Ship	Year of Sinking	Photo	Year of Commission
USS New York (ACR-2)	1941	USS New York (ACR-2)	1893
USS California (ACR-6)	1918	USS California (ACR-6)	1907
USS Northampton (CA-26)	1942	USS Northampton (CA-26)	1930
USS Houston (CA-30)	1942	USS Houston (CA-30)	1930
USS Chicago (CA-29)	1943	USS Chicago (CA-29)	1931
USS Indianapolis (CA-35)	1945	USS Indianapolis (CA-35)	1932
USS Astoria (CA-34)	1942	USS Astoria (CA-34)	1934
USS Erie (PG-50)	1942	No Image Available	1936
USS Quincy (CA-39)	1942	USS Quincy (CA-39)	1936
USS Vincennes (CA-44)	1942	USS Vincennes (CA-44)	1937
USS Helena (CL-50)	1943	USS Helena (CL-50)	1939
USS Atlanta (CL-51)	1942	USS Atlanta (CL-51)	1941
USS Juneau (CL-52)	1942	USS Juneau (CL-52)	1942

From Testing
Ship	Year of Sinking	Photo	Year of Commission
USS Frankfurt	1921	USS Frankfurt	1918 (Given to the United States from Germany after WWI)
USS Salt Lake City (CA-25)	1948	USS Salt Lake City (CA-25)	1929
USS Pensacola (CA-24)	1948	USS Pensacola (CA-24)	1930
USS Vincennes (CL-64)	1969	USS Vincennes (CL-64)	1944
USS Wilkes-Barre (CL-103)	1972	USS Wilkes Barre (CL-103)	1944
USS Atlanta (CL-104)	1970	USS Atlanta (CL-104)	1944

From Accidents
Ship	Year of Sinking	Photo	Year of Commission
USS Chicago (1885)	1936	USS Chicago (1885)	1885
USS Charleston (C-2)	1899	USS Charleston (C-2)	1889
USS Maine (1890)	1898	USS Maine (1890)	1890
USS Tacoma (CL-20)	1924	USS Tacoma (CL-20)	1904

== Destroyers ==
From Combat or Supporting Combat Operations
Ship	Year of Sinking	Year of Commission
USS Jacob Jones (DD-61)	1917	1916
USS Little (DD-79)	1942	1918
USS Gregory (DD-82)	1942	1918
USS Colhoun (DD-85)	1942	1918
USS Palmer (DD-161)	1945	1918
USS Ward (DD-139)	1944	1918
USS McKean (DD-90)	1943	1919
USS Jacob Jones (DD-130)	1942	1919
USS Hovey (DD-208)	1945	1919
USS Long (DD-209)	1945	1919
USS Leary (DD-158)	1943	1919
USS Borie (DD-215)	1943	1920
USS Pope (DD-225)	1942	1920
USS Stewart (DD-224)	1942	1920
USS Peary (DD-226)	1942	1920
USS Edsall (DD-219)	1942	1920
USS Pillsbury (DD-227)	1942	1920
USS Truxtun (DD-229)	1942	1920
USS Reuben James (DD-245)	1941	1920
USS Barry (DD-248)	1941	1921
USS Perry (DD-340)	1944	1922
USS Hull (DD-350)	1944	1935
USS Monaghan (DD-354)	1944	1935
USS Porter (DD-356)	1942	1936
USS Mahan (DD-364)	1944	1936
USS Tucker (DD-374)	1942	1936
USS Cushing (DD-376)	1942	1936
USS Preston (DD-379)	1942	1936
USS Reid (DD-369)	1944	1936
USS Blue (DD-387)	1942	1937
USS Henley (DD-391)	1943	1937
USS Jarvis (DD-393)	1942	1937
USS Benham (DD-397)	1942	1939
USS Rowan (DD-405)	1943	1939
USS Sims (DD-409)	1942	1939
USS Hammann (DD-412)	1942	1939
USS O'Brien (DD-415)	1942	1940
USS Walke (DD-416)	1942	1940
USS Buck (DD-420)	1943	1940
USS Lansdale (DD-426)	1944	1940
USS Gwin (DD-433)	1943	1941
USS Meredith (DD-434)	1942	1941
USS Monssen (DD-436)	1942	1941
USS Emmons (DD-457)	1945	1941
USS Corry (DD-463)	1944	1941
USS Chevalier (DD-451)	1943	1942
USS Laffey (DD-459)	1942	1942
USS Strong (DD-467)	1943	1942
USS De Haven (DD-469)	1943	1942
USS Barton (DD-599)	1942	1942
USS Pringle (DD-477)	1945	1942
USS Aaron Ward (DD-483)	1943	1942
USS Maddox (DD-622)	1943	1942
USS Glennon (DD-620)	1944	1942
USS Beatty (DD-640)	1943	1942
USS Duncan (DD-485)	1942	1942
USS Brownson (DD-518)	1943	1943
USS Spence (DD-512)	1944	1943
USS Abner Read (DD-526)	1944	1943
USS Bush (DD-529)	1945	1943
USS Luce (DD-522)	1945	1943
USS Hoel (DD-533)	1944	1943
USS Johnston (DD-557)	1944	1943
USS Longshaw (DD-559)	1945	1943
USS Callaghan (DD-792)	1945	1943
USS Morrison (DD-560)	1945	1943
USS William D. Porter (DD-579)	1945	1943
USS Halligan (DD-584)	1945	1943
USS Twiggs (DD-591)	1945	1943
USS Cooper (DD-695)	1944	1944
USS Meredith (DD-726)	1944	1944
USS Mannert L. Abele (DD-733)	1945	1944
USS Drexler (DD-741)	1945	1944
USS Colhoun (DD-801)	1945	1944
USS Little (DD-803)	1945	1944

From Testing
Ship	Year of Sinking	Year of Commission
USS Stribling (DD-96)	1937	1918
USS Radford (DD-120)	1937	1918
USS Champlin (DD-104)	1936	1918
USS Ingraham (DD-111)	1937	1919
USS Anthony (DD-172)	1937	1919
USS Sproston (DD-173)	1937	1919
USS Hogan (DD-178)	1945	1919
USS Smith Thompson (DD-212)	1936	1919
USS Thompson (DD-305)	1944	1920
USS Sloat (DD-316)	1935	1920
USS Marcus (DD-321)	1935	1921
USS Lamson (DD-367)	1946	1936
USS Conyngham (DD-371)	1948	1936
USS Mugford (DD-389)	1948	1937
USS Ralph Talbot (DD-390)	1948	1937
USS Mayrant (DD-402)	1948	1939
USS Trippe (DD-403)	1948	1939
USS Rhind (DD-404)	1948	1939
USS Stack (DD-406)	1948	1939
USS Wilson (DD-408)	1948	1939
USS Hughes (DD-410)	1948	1939
USS Anderson (DD-411)	1946	1939
USS Mustin (DD-413)	1948	1939
USS Wainwright (DD-419)	1948	1940
USS Madison (DD-425)	1969	1940
USS Charles F. Hughes (DD-428)	1969	1940
USS Ericsson (DD-440)	1970	1941
USS Fitch (DD-462)	1973	1942
USS Saufley (DD-465)	1968	1942
USS Waller (DD-466)	1970	1942
USS Beale (DD-471)	1969	1942
USS Bailey (DD-492)	1969	1942
USS Conway (DD-507)	1970	1942
USS Meade (DD-602)	1973	1942
USS Boyle (DD-600)	1973	1942
USS Gansevoort (DD-608)	1972	1942
USS Gillespie (DD-609)	1973	1942
USS Cony (DD-508)	1970	1942
USS Kendrick (DD-612)	1966	1942
USS Kalk (DD-611)	1969	1942
USS MacKenzie (DD-614)	1974	1942
USS Hobby (DD-610)	1972	1942
USS Gherardi (DD-637)	1973	1942
USS Eaton (DD-510)	1970	1942
USS Knight (DD-633)	1967	1942
USS Herndon (DD-638)	1973	1942
USS Fullam (DD-474)	1962	1943
USS Frankford (DD-497)	1973	1943
USS Tingey (DD-539)	1966	1943
USS Bell (DD-587)	1975	1943
USS Thorn (DD-647)	1974	1943
USS Burns (DD-588)	1974	1943
USS Wickes (DD-578)	1974	1943
USS Colahan (DD-658)	1966	1943
USS Young (DD-580)	1970	1943
USS Hopewell (DD-681)	1972	1943
USS Haraden (DD-585)	1973	1943
USS Porterfield (DD-682)	1982	1943
USS Picking (DD-685)	1997	1943
USS Ingersoll (DD-652)	1974	1943
USS Caperton (DD-650)	1985~	1943
USS Barton (DD-722)	1969	1943
USS Robinson (DD-562)	1982	1944
USS O'Brien (DD-725)	1972	1944
USS Ross (DD-563)	1978	1944
USS Stockham (DD-683)	1977	1944
USS Blue (DD-744)	1977	1944
USS Gregory (DD-802)	1971	1944
USS Rowe (DD-564)	1978	1944
USS Stoddard (DD-566)	1997	1944
USS Howorth (DD-592)	1962	1944
USS John W. Weeks (DD-701)	1970	1944
USS Killen (DD-593)	1975	1944
USS Alfred A. Cunningham (DD-752)	1979	1944
USS Tolman (DD-740)	1997	1944
USS Lindsey (DD-771)	1972	1944
USS Soley (DD-707)	1970	1944
USS Southerland (DD-743)	1997	1944
USS Higbee (DD-806)	1986	1945
USS Gyatt (DD-712)	1970	1945
USS George K. MacKenzie (DD-836)	1976	1945
USS Vesole (DD-878)	1983	1945
USS John R. Craig (DD-885)	1976	1945
USS Duncan (DD-874)	1980	1945
USS William M. Wood (DD-715)	1983	1945
USS Stribling (DD-867)	1980	1945
USS Charles R. Ware (DD-865)	1981	1945
USS Samuel B. Roberts (DD-823)	1971	1945
USS Glennon (DD-840)	1981	1945
USS William C. Lawe (DD-763)	1999	1946
USS Bausell (DD-845)	1987	1946
USS Witek (DD-848)	1969	1946
USS Robert L. Wilson (DD-847)	1980	1946
USS Agerholm (DD-826)	1982	1946
USS Basilone (DD-824)	1982	1949
USS John Paul Jones (DD-932)	2001	1953
USS Decatur (DD-936)	2004	1956
USS Jonas Ingram (DD-938)	1988	1957
USS Bigelow (DD-942)	2003	1957
USS Mullinnix (DD-944)	1992	1958
USS Hull (DD-945)	1998	1958
USS Richard S. Edwards (DD-950)	1997	1959
USS Somers (DD-947)	1998	1959
USS Parsons (DD-949)	1989	1959
USS Henry B. Wilson (DDG-7)	2003	1960

From Accidents
Ship	Year of Sinking	Year of Commission
USS Chauncey (DD-3)	1917	1903
USS Woolsey (DD-77)	1921	1918
USS Delphy (DD-261)	1923	1918
USS Walker (DD-163)	1941	1919
USS Greene (DD-266)	1945	1919
USS Southard (DD-207)	1945	1919
USS Thornton (DD-270)	1945	1919
USS Chauncey (DD-296)	1923	1919
USS Fuller (DD-297)	1923	1920
USS Sturtevant (DD-240)	1942	1920
USS Woodbury (DD-309)	1923	1920
USS S. P. Lee (DD-310)	1923	1920
USS Young (DD-312)	1923	1920
USS Nicholas (DD-311)	1923	1920
USS Noa (DD-343)	1944	1921
USS Wasmuth (DD-338)	1942	1921
USS Perkins (DD-377)	1943	1936
USS Warrington (DD-383)	1944	1938
USS Ingraham (DD-444)	1942	1941
USS Hobson (DD-464)	1952	1942
USS Bache (DD-470)	1968	1942
USS Philip (DD-498)	1972	1942
USS Baldwin (DD-624)	1961	1943
USS Turner (DD-648)	1944	1943
USS Frank E. Evans (DD-754)	1969	1945

== Minesweepers, Minelayers, and Mine Countermeasure Ships ==
Sunk in Combat or Supporting Combat Operations
Ship	Year of Sinking	Year of Commission
USS Tanager (AM-5)	1942	1918
USS Bittern (AM-36)	1942	1919
USS Osprey (AM-56)	1944	1940
USS Skylark (AM-63)	1945	1942
USS Miantonomah (CMc-5)	1944	1941
USS Skill (AM-115)	1943	1942
USS Sentinel (AM-113)	1943	1942
USS Tide (AM-125)	1944	1943
USS Swallow (AM-65)	1945	1943
USS Magpie (AMS-25)	1950	1943
USS Salute (AM-294)	1945	1943
USS Swerve (AM-121)	1944	1944
USS Pirate (AM-275)	1950	1944
USS Pledge (AM-277)	1950	1944
USS Partridge (AMS-31)	1951	1945

Sunk During Testing
Ship	Year of Sinking	Year of Commission
USS Crow (AMc-20)	1944	1941

Sunk in an Accident
Ship	Year of Sinking	Year of Commission
USS Swallow (AM-4)	1938	1918
USS Cardinal (AM-6)	1923	1918
USS Sanderling (AM-37)	1937	1918
USS Curlew (AM-8)	1925	1919
USS Peacock (AM-46)	1940	1919
USS Hornbill (AMc-13)	1942	1940
USS Bunting (AMc-7)	1942	1941
USS Weehawken (CM-12)	1945	1942
USS Valor (AMc-108)	1944	1942
USS Industry (AMc-86)	1945	1944
USS Force (AM-445)	1973	1953
USS Guardian (MCM-5)	2013	1989

== Auxiliary ships ==
Sunk in Combat or Supporting Combat Operations
Ship	Year of sinking	Photo	Year of commission
USS Pecos (AO-6)	1921	USS Pecos (AO-6)	1942

Sunk During Testing
Ship	Year of sinking	Photo	Year of commission
USS Acadia (AD-42)	2010	USS Acadia (Top) Sailing with USS Fresno LST-1182 in 1982	1981

Sunk in an Accident
Ship	Year of sinking	Photo	Year of commission
USS Cyclops (AC-4)	1918	USS Cyclops (AC-4)	1917
