= List of ship launches in 1956 =

The list of ship launches in 1956 includes a chronological list of all ships launched in 1956.

Date	Ship	Class / type	Builder	Location	Country	Notes
5 January	Lester	Dealey-class destroyer escort	Defoe Shipbuilding Company	Bay City, Michigan	United States	
12 January	Duke of Argyll	Ferry	Harland & Wolff	Belfast	United Kingdom	For British Railways.
17 January	Confident	Confiance-class tug	Harland & Wolff	Belfast	United Kingdom	For Royal Navy.
20 January	Alamo	Thomaston-class dock landing ship	Ingalls Shipbuilding	Pascagoula, Mississippi	United States	
27 January	Maddiston	Ton-class minesweeper	Harland & Wolff	Belfast	United Kingdom	For Royal Navy.
31 January	Lappe	Motor lighter	Harland & Wolff	Belfast	United Kingdom	For Shell Oil Co.
4 February	John Willis	Dealey-class destroyer escort	New York Shipbuilding	Camden, New Jersey	United States	
25 February	Salmon	Sailfish-class submarine	Portsmouth Naval Shipyard	Kittery, Maine	United States	
27 February	King Aegeus	Cargo ship	Blyth Dry Docks & Shipbuilding Co. Ltd	Blyth, Northumberland	United Kingdom	For Markos P. Nomikos.
29 February	Trochus	Hopper ship	Brooke Marine Ltd.	Lowestoft	United Kingdom	For Queensland Government.
2 March	Solfon	Tanker	Harland & Wolff	Belfast	United Kingdom	For Sigval Bergsen.
24 March	Colbert	Anti-aircraft cruiser	Brest Dockyards	Brest	France	
27 March	Rowanmore	Cargo ship	Harland & Wolff	Belfast	United Kingdom	For Johnston Warren & Co.
28 March	Davis	Forrest Sherman-class destroyer	Fore River Shipyard	Quincy, Massachusetts	United States	
28 March	Shrivenham	Ham-class minesweeper	J. Bolson & Son Ltd.	Poole	United Kingdom	For Royal Navy.
29 March	Margaree	St. Laurent-class destroyer	Halifax Shipyards	Halifax, Nova Scotia	Canada	
12 April	Manley	Forrest Sherman-class destroyer	Bath Iron Works	Bath, Maine	United States	
19 April	Ragnvald Jarl	Passenger ship	Blohm & Voss	Hamburg	West Germany	For NFDS
25 April	Bridget	Dealey-class destroyer escort	Puget Sound Bridge and Dredging Company	Seattle, Washington	United States	
26 April	Harvella	Tanker	Harland & Wolff	Belfast	United Kingdom	For Shell Oil Co.
1 May	Repton	Ton-class minesweeper	Harland & Wolff	Belfast	United Kingdom	For Royal Navy.
3 May	Mauna Kea	Suribachi-class ammunition ship	Bethlehem Steel	Sparrows Point, Maryland	United States	
9 May	Empress of England	Ocean liner	Vickers-Armstrongs	Newcastle upon Tyne	United Kingdom	For Canadian Pacific Railway Co.
10 May	Palliser	Blackwood-class frigate	Alexander Stephen and Sons	Glasgow, Scotland	United Kingdom	
Unknown date	Sokol	Fishing trawler	Brooke Marine Ltd.	Lowestoft	United Kingdom	For private owner.
23 May	Flying Duck	Tug	Harland & Wolff	Belfast	United Kingdom	For Clyde Shipping Co.
24 May	Maxton	Ton-class minesweeper	Harland & Wolff	Belfast	United Kingdom	For Royal Navy.
28 May	Darter	Unique submarine	Electric Boat	Groton, Connecticut	United States	
7 June	Ondo	Cargo ship	Harland & Wolff	Belfast	United Kingdom	For Elder Dempster.
19 June	7 de Agosto	Halland-class destroyer	Götaverken	Gothenburg	Sweden	For Colombian Navy
19 June	Wandsbek	Type I ferry	Norderwerft	Hamburg	West Germany	For HADAG
21 June	Tuscany	Refrigerated cargo ship	Harland & Wolff	Belfast	United Kingdom	For Royal Mail Line.
29 June	Karp	Fishing trawler	Brooke Marine Ltd.	Lowestoft	United Kingdom	For private owner.
12 July	Hermitage	Thomaston-class dock landing ship	Ingalls Shipbuilding	Pascagoula, Mississippi	United States	
19 July	Jollenführer 1	Ferry type 00	Scheel & Jöhnk	Harburg	West Germany	For HADAG
28 July	Van Voorhis	Dealey-class destroyer escort	New York Shipbuilding	Camden, New Jersey	United States	
31 July	Sever	Fishing trawler	Brooke Marine Ltd.	Lowestoft	United Kingdom	For private owner.
7 August	Jonas Ingram	Forrest Sherman-class destroyer	Fore River Shipyard	Quincy, Massachusetts	United States	
7 August	Missouri	Tanker	Harland & Wolff	Belfast	United Kingdom	For Texaco Oil Co.
10 August	Monticello	Thomaston-class dock landing ship	Ingalls Shipbuilding	Pascagoula, Mississippi	United States	
13 August	Farmsen	Type I ferry	Ottensener Eisenwerke	Hamburg	West Germany	For HADAG
21 August	Scottish Coast	Ferry	Harland & Wolff	Belfast	United Kingdom	For Coast Lines.
4 September	Harborough	Cargo ship	Blyth Dry Docks & Shipbuilding Co. Ltd	Blyth, Northumberland	United Kingdom	For National Steamship Co. Ltd.
5 September	Suffolk County	De Soto County-class tank landing ship	Boston Naval Shipyard	Boston, Massachusetts	United States	
8 September	Du Pont	Forrest Sherman-class destroyer	Bath Iron Works	Bath, Maine	United States	
29 September	Ranger	Forrestal-class aircraft carrier	Newport News Shipbuilding	Newport News, Virginia	United States	
9 October	Vostock	Fishing trawler	Brooke Marine Ltd.	Lowestoft	United Kingdom	For private owner.
12 October	Grant County	De Soto County-class tank landing ship	Avondale Shipyard	Avondale, Louisiana	United States	
22 October	Nurton	Ton-class minesweeper	Harland & Wolff	Belfast	United Kingdom	For Royal Navy.
27 October	Vampire	Daring-class destroyer	Cockatoo Island Dockyard	Sydney, New South Wales	Australia	
1 November	Columbia	Restigouche-class destroyer	Burrard Dry Dock	Vancouver, British Columbia	Canada	
1 November	Albany	Refrigerated cargo ship	Harland & Wolff	Belfast	United Kingdom	For Royal Mail Line.
20 November	Khukri	Blackwood-class frigate	J. Samuel White	Cowes, Isle of Wight	United Kingdom	For Indian Navy
20 November	Storfonn	Tanker	Harland & Wolff	Belfast	United Kingdom	For Sigval Bergsen.
21 November	Port Launceston	Refrigerated cargo ship	Harland & Wolff	Belfast	United Kingdom	For Port Line.
22 November	Sylvania	Saxonia-class ocean liner	John Brown & Company	Clydebank, Scotland	United Kingdom	For Cunard Line
22 November	Yug	Fishing trawler	Brooke Marine Ltd.	Lowestoft	United Kingdom	For private owner.
24 November	Hartley	Dealey-class destroyer escort	New York Shipbuilding	Camden, New Jersey	United States	
29 November	Flying Drake	Tug	Harland & Wolff	Belfast	United Kingdom	For Clyde Shipping Co.
November	ADDSCO 606	Hopper barge	Alabama Drydock and Shipbuilding Company	Mobile, Alabama	United States	For Alabama Drydock and Shipbuilding Company.
November	ADDSCO 607	Hopper barge	Alabama Drydock and Shipbuilding Company	Mobile, Alabama	United States	For Alabama Drydock and Shipbuilding Company.
November	ADDSCO 608	Hopper barge	Alabama Drydock and Shipbuilding Company	Mobile, Alabama	United States	For Alabama Drydock and Shipbuilding Company.
19 December	Blandy	Forrest Sherman-class destroyer	Fore River Shipyard	Quincy, Massachusetts	United States	
20 December	Zapad	Fishing trawler	Brooke Marine Ltd.	Lowestoft	United Kingdom	For private owner.
21 December	Cloverbank	Cargo ship	Harland & Wolff	Belfast	United Kingdom	For Bank Line.
Unknown date	Hada	Tanker	Blyth Dry Docks & Shipbuilding Co. Ltd	Blyth, Northumberland	United Kingdom	For A/S Aurland.
