= USS Parsons =

Forrest Sherman-class destroyer

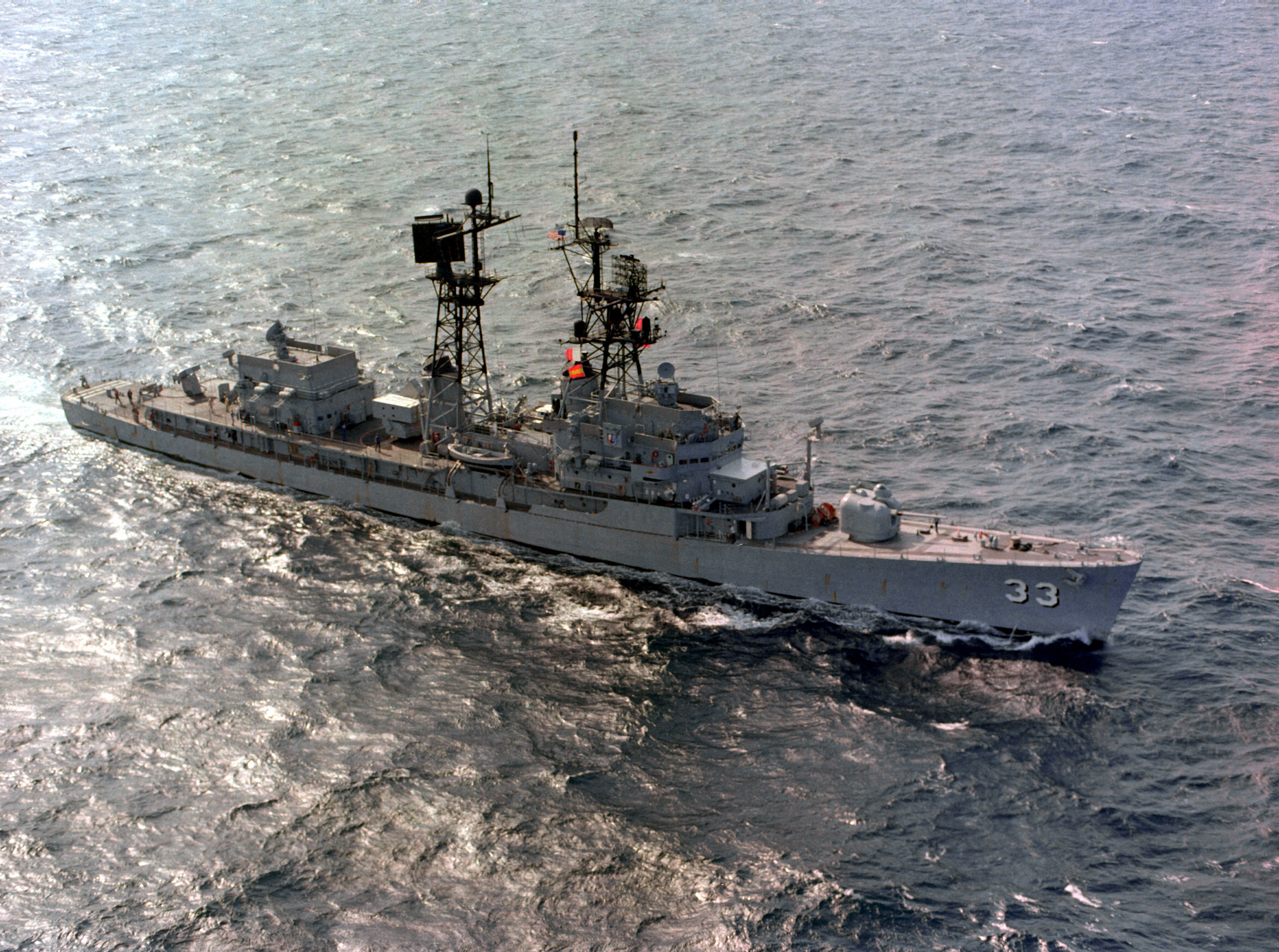
- USS Parsons (DDG-33)

History

United States
- Namesake: R.Adm. William S. Parsons
- Builder: Ingalls Shipbuilding
- Laid down: 17 June 1957
- Launched: 17 August 1958
- Acquired: 22 October 1959
- Commissioned: 29 October 1959
- Decommissioned: 19 November 1982
- Stricken: 1 December 1984
- Fate: Sunk as a target, 25 April 1989

General characteristics
- Class & type: Forrest Sherman-class destroyer
- Displacement: 4,000 tons
- Length: 418 ft (127 m)
- Beam: 45 ft (14 m)
- Draft: 20 ft (6.1 m)
- Speed: 33 knots (61 km/h; 38 mph)
- Range: 4,500 nautical miles at 20 kt; (8,300 km at 37 km/h)
- Complement: 256 officers and men
- Armament: 3 × 5 in (127 mm) guns, 6 × 3 in (76 mm) guns, RUR-5 ASROC, one depth charge track, two hedgehog depth change projectors, 2 × 21 inch (533 mm) torpedo tubes

USS Parsons (DD-949/DDG-33) began her career as a Forrest Sherman-class destroyer of the United States Navy. She was named in honor of Rear Admiral William S. Parsons (1901–1953), who worked on the Manhattan Project during World War II.

Parsons' keel was laid down 17 June 1957 by Ingalls Shipbuilding of Pascagoula, Mississippi. She was launched on 17 August 1959, sponsored by Mrs. William S. Parsons, and commissioned 29 October 1959 at Charleston, South Carolina.

== History ==
After shakedown, Parsons reported to her home port, San Diego, California, and commenced operations with the First Fleet in February 1960. In October she deployed to the Western Pacific with Seventh Fleet units. She returned to resume West Coast operations in July 1961 and entered the Long Beach Naval Shipyard on 6 October for major improvements in her communications and antisubmarine warfare (ASW) equipment. She then rejoined the First Fleet in extensive coastal training from January to November 1962, deployed for her second WestPac tour in November, and returned in July 1963 to the California coast.

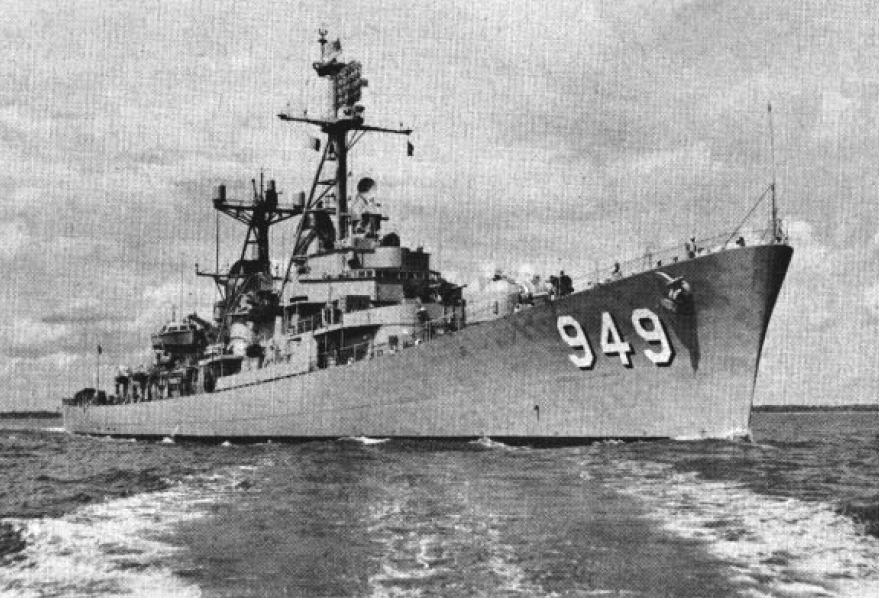
USS Parsons (DD-949), circa 1961.

Under the command of Cdr. Jack Jester, USN, during the summer and fall of 1963 she carried out AAW and ASW operations in the San Diego, California area. During November she escorted USS Midway (CVA-41) and USS Hancock (CVA-19) to the Western Pacific and returned to San Diego. During the summer of 1965, Parsons visited San Francisco, Puget Sound, and Hawaii as part of the Pacific Midshipman Training Squadron. Parsons continued her training and service operations alternately with First Fleet and Seventh Fleet until she was decommissioned at the Long Beach Naval Shipyard on 19 January 1966.

Parsons was one of four Forrest Sherman-class destroyers selected for conversion from all-gun destroyers to the new Decatur class of guided missile destroyer. The others were USS Decatur (DD-936/DDG-31), USS John Paul Jones (DD-932/DDG-32), and USS Somers (DD-947/DDG-34). Parsons was assigned hull classification symbol DDG-33 on 15 March 1967, recommissioned 3 November 1967, and assigned to the Cruiser-Destroyer Force, Pacific Fleet. Following shakedown she carried out a rigorous testing program for her missile systems, and in September 1968 she assumed duties as flagship for Destroyer Squadron 31 (DesRon 31) and immediately deployed to the Western Pacific for operations with the Seventh Fleet off Vietnam. Interspersed with her aircraft carrier escort duties on Yankee Station, she conducted on-station training operations, assuming duties as ASW training coordinator ship with Commander Destroyer Squadron 31 (ComDesRon 31) embarked. Parsons also visited Kaohsiung, Yokosuka, Hong Kong, Singapore and Sasebo. She returned to San Diego, California, on 12 May 1969 to resume operations from there and train for her next deployment.

The conversion removed both of the after 5 in (127 mm) 54-caliber gun mounts and installed one AN/SPG-51C Missile Fire Control System (MFCS), one Mk.13 Guided Missile Launching System (GMLS), one Anti-Submarine Rocket (ASROC) system, and modified the Gun Fire Control System to accommodate an illuminator to provide a second missile capable Gun/Missile Fire Control System (G/MFCS). The ship could then engage two air targets simultaneously (one with each FCS) using from two to four Tartar medium-range, less than 20 nautical mile (37 km) missiles, depending upon the engagement policy in force (Shoot-Look-Shoot or Shoot-Shoot-Look).

The forward five-inch/54-caliber gun mount was retained as were the torpedo tubes. The 5 in (127 mm) 54-caliber gun was, nominally, a rapid-fire mount capable of firing over 30 rounds per minute at targets up to ranges of 12 nautical miles (22 km). The torpedo launchers each held three Mk46 torpedoes, for use only against submarines.

The conversion created a unique ship, but one that never found a unique role. In the long run, one of the ship's best capabilities, convoy escort, was taken over by the Oliver Hazard Perry class.

After conversion, Parsons was homeported in San Diego, California, from re-activation until late 1971, when the ship, as part of Destroyer Squadron 15 (DesRon 15), was forward deployed to Yokosuka, Japan. As part of this movement, the families of all eligible crewmen were transported to Japan, where they lived in U.S. Navy Housing, located in both the Yokosuka and Yokohama areas.

From December 1971 through December 1972, Parsons provided support to forces afloat and ashore involved in the Vietnam War by operating as:

- Naval Gunfire Support (NGFS) unit in both I and IV Corps areas, with the vast majority of operating time spent very close to the DMZ, supporting Marines in that area.
- Search and Rescue (SAR) unit (or escort when a DLG held the SAR position) at both the North (N-SAR) and South (S-SAR) stations in the northern Tonkin Gulf. This station provided a means to rescue downed U.S. pilots.
- Carrier escort on Yankee Station.

Parsons left Vietnam for the last time on or around 19 December 1974.

On 29 October 1980 she rescued 111 Vietnamese refugees 330 miles south of Saigon.

DDG operations ranged from Anti-Aircraft Warfare (AAW) to Anti-Submarine Warfare (ASW) to Anti-Surface Warfare (SUW) and Naval Gunfire Support (NFGS) and included, as necessary, Electronic Warfare (EW).

== Fate ==
Parsons was decommissioned on 19 November 1982. She was stricken from the Navy Directory on 1 December 1984, and finally disposed of as a target on 25 April 1989.
