= Richard S. Edwards =

United States Navy admiral (1885–1956)

- Born: February 18, 1885; Philadelphia, Pennsylvania, US
- Died: June 2, 1956 (aged 71); Oakland, California, US
- Military career
- Branch: United States Navy
- Service years: 1908-1947
- Rank: Admiral
- Commands: USS Wood (DD-317); Submarine Squadron 6 Submarine Base, New London, Connecticut; USS Colorado (BB-45); Submarines, Patrol Force; Submarines, Atlantic Fleet
- Conflicts: World War I World War II
- Awards: Navy Cross

Admiral Richard Stanislaus Edwards (18 February 1885 – 2 June 1956) served in the United States Navy during World War I and World War II.

== Biography ==
Born in Philadelphia, Pennsylvania, Edwards was appointed to the United States Naval Academy in 1903. He was commissioned ensign on 13 September 1908 and through subsequent advancement attained the rank of admiral, to date from 13 April 1945.

During World War I, he served as engineer officer on board the battleship USS Kentucky, then as gunnery officer on board the battleships USS Kansas and USS Arkansas. His commands included the destroyer USS Wood; Submarine Squadron 6; Submarine Base, New London, Connecticut; the battleship USS Colorado; Submarines, Patrol Force; and Submarines, Atlantic Fleet.

During World War II he served as Deputy Chief of Staff and Aide to the Commander in Chief, United States Fleet and then Deputy Commander in Chief, U.S. Fleet, and Deputy Chief of Naval Operations, all under Ernest J. King, Chief of Naval Operations and Commander in Chief, United States Fleet. For his World War II service, Edwards was awarded the Distinguished Service Medal. He subsequently served as Vice Chief of Naval Operations, Commander, Western Sea Frontier, and Commander, Pacific Reserve Fleet. He was transferred to the Navy's retired list on 1 July 1947, concluding a total of 43 years of naval service.

He died at the Naval Hospital, Oakland, California, 2 June 1956.

== Decorations ==
Here is the ribbon bar of Admiral Richard S. Edwards:

Submarine Warfare insignia
| 1st Row | Navy Cross | | Navy Distinguished Service Medal |
| 2nd Row | World War I Victory Medal with "Grand Fleet" clasp | American Defense Service Medal with "Fleet" Clasp | American Campaign Medal |
| 3rd Row | European-African-Middle Eastern Campaign Medal with three Service stars | Asiatic-Pacific Campaign Medal with one service star | World War II Victory Medal |
| 4th Row | Navy Occupation Service Medal | Honorary Knight Commander of the Order of the British Empire | Commandeur of the Legion of Honor |
| 5th Row | French Croix de guerre 1939–1945 with Palm | Commander's Cross with Star of the Order of Polonia Restituta | Grand Cordon of the Order of Yun Hui |

== Namesake ==
The Forrest Sherman-class destroyer USS Richard S. Edwards was named for him.
