= USS Morton =

Forrest Sherman-class destroyer

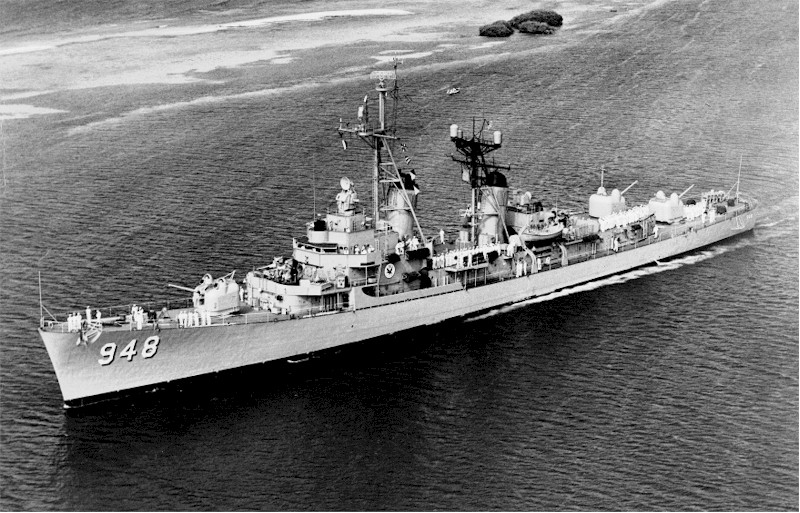
- USS Morton (DD-948), October 1959, entering the harbor of Oranjestad, Aruba

History

United States
- Namesake: Dudley "Mush" Morton
- Ordered: 27 January 1956
- Builder: Ingalls Shipbuilding
- Laid down: 4 March 1957
- Launched: 23 May 1958
- Acquired: 14 May 1959
- Commissioned: 26 May 1959
- Decommissioned: 22 November 1982
- Stricken: 7 February 1990
- Nickname(s): "The Saltiest Ship in the Fleet!"
- Fate: Broken up in 1993

General characteristics
- Class & type: Forrest Sherman-class destroyer
- Displacement: 2,800 tons standard.; 4,050 tons full load.
- Length: 407 ft (124 m) waterline, 418 ft (127 m) overall.
- Beam: 45 ft (14 m)
- Draft: 22 ft (6.7 m)
- Propulsion: 4 x 1,200 psi (8.3 MPa) Foster-Wheeler boilers, Westinghouse steam turbines; 70,000 shp (52 MW); 2 x shafts.
- Speed: 32.5 knots (60.2 km/h; 37.4 mph)
- Range: 4,500 nautical miles (8,300 km) at 20 knots (37 km/h)
- Complement: 15 officers, 218 enlisted.
- Armament: 3 x 5 in (127 mm)/54 calibre dual purpose Mk 42 guns; 4 x 3 in (76 mm)/50 calibre Mark 33 anti-aircraft guns; 2 x mark 10/11 Hedgehogs; 6 x 12.75 in (324 mm) Mark 32 torpedo tubes.

USS Morton (DD-948) was a Forrest Sherman-class destroyer of the United States Navy, named for Commander Dudley "Mush" Morton USN (1907–1943), commanding officer of USS Wahoo (SS-238) during World War II.

Morton was laid down 4 March 1957, by Ingalls Shipbuilding Corp., Pascagoula, Miss.; launched 23 May 1958; sponsored by Miss Edwina R. Morton; and commissioned 26 May 1959 at North Charleston, SC.

== History ==
After a training cruise in the Caribbean, she proceeded to the West Coast, arriving NS San Diego, Calif., 20 October 1959. She deployed to the western Pacific in January 1960, participated in Operation Blue Star, a joint Navy, Marine, Air Force amphibious operation in March, and made a special "People-to-People" visit to Bombay, India, before returning to the West Coast 31 May. Departing San Diego 3 April, she reported for one month's duty in the Formosa Patrol, during which time she participated in Operation Handclasp, carrying food, medicine, and clothing to the less fortunate people of free China. She returned to San Diego 28 September 1961, and continued operations off the West Coast, until sailing 13 November 1962 for another WestPac deployment. Following duty with the Formosa Patrol, and operations off Japan, she steamed home, arriving San Diego 15 June 1963.

Morton continued operations off the West Coast until August 1964, when she steamed to the South China Sea and patrolled off South Vietnam. On 11 September 1964, approximately one month after the Gulf of Tonkin Incident, the Director of the Naval Security Group, Pacific (DIRNAVSECGRUPAC) informed the Director of the National Security Agency of plans for an intercept team, SIGAD USN-467P, to be aboard the Morton. The DESOTO patrol, part of Operation 34A, was conducted by the USS Morton and the USS Richard S. Edwards approximately one month after the Gulf of Tonkin incident. She spent the next several months screening aircraft carriers before returning to the West Coast 6 February 1965.

Arriving off South Vietnam in April 1966 the destroyer shelled Vietcong supply points and encampments for the next four months. After a short break, Morton began Sea Dragon operations off North Vietnam in May 1967. During these raids, she targeted enemy coast defense sites and radar installations and interdicted barge traffic along the coast. Morton also provided gunfire support for the 12th Marine Regiment near the DMZ before returning to San Diego 3 November.

Morton departed San Diego 31 October 1968, again joined the gun-line and bombarded North Vietnamese and Vietcong supply points and bunkers up and down the coast. The destroyer returned home in the late spring and began preparations for an anti-submarine weapons system modernization at Long Beach Naval Shipyard. The warship decommissioned at Long Beach on 26 September 1969.

Recommissioned 15 August 1970, Morton spent the next year testing her new SQS-23 sonar, ASROC launcher and new electronic systems. As part of this refresher training, Morton conducted numerous ASW exercises against friendly submarines off Hawaii and California. Following a tender availability in Pearl Harbor in early 1971, Morton sailed on her next WestPac deployment on 9 September. She conducted two gun-line tours before sailing for home on 1 March 1972 via Australia. Later in the year, she participated in several ASW exercises before deploying again to WestPac on 13 October. More gunline tours followed, including a Linebacker raid on North Vietnamese coastal targets in December 1972.

Following the ceasefire of 28 January 1973, Morton patrolled off South Vietnam until sailing for home on 19 February 1973. With the end of hostilities, Morton's ensuing deployments to WestPac centered around providing screen and escort services for carrier task forces. During these years, Morton also continued to participate in ASW exercises, owing to the threat from the growing Soviet submarine fleet.

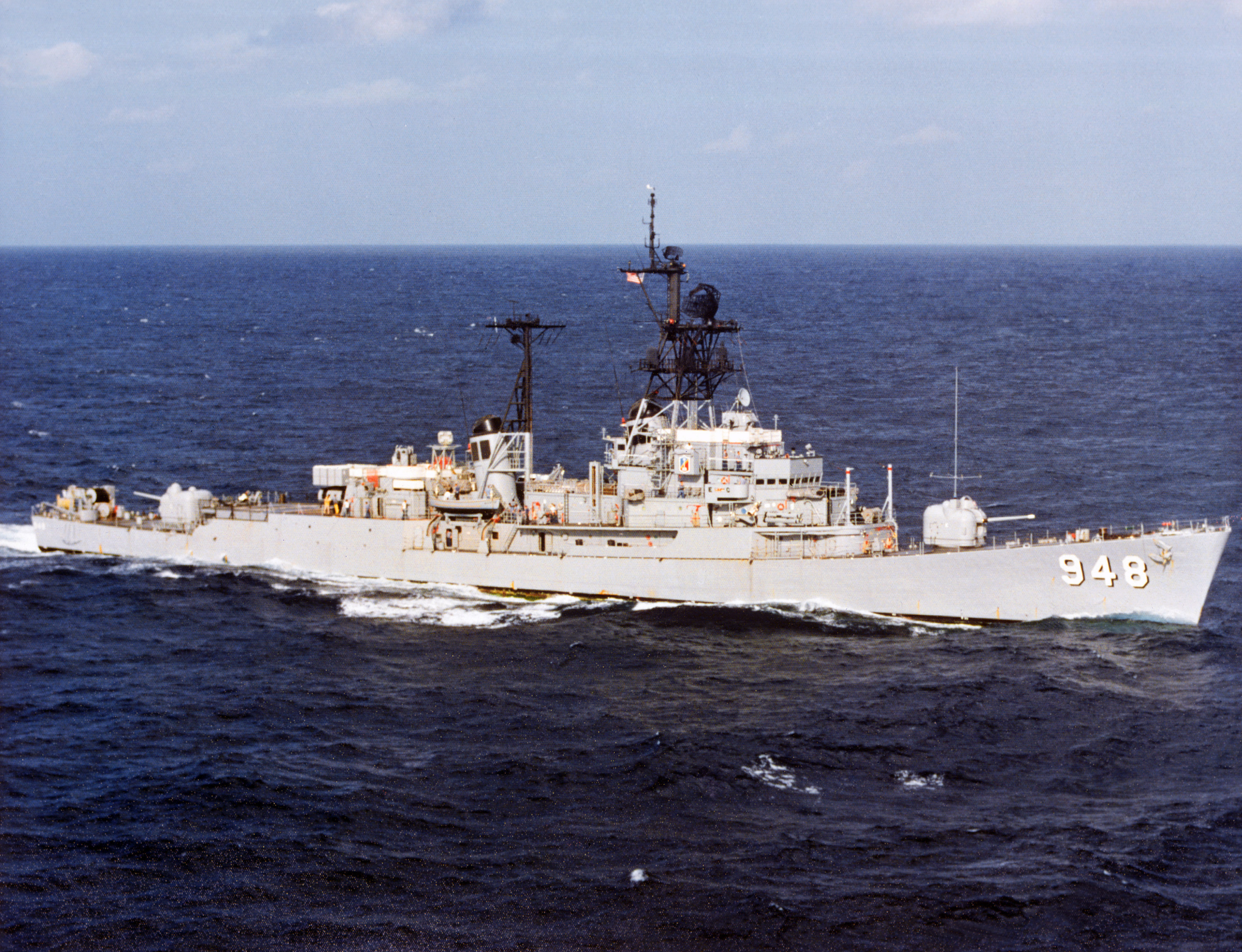
USS Morton (DDG 948), third Mark 42 gun mount replaced with ASROC launcher.

After enduring serious boiler problems in the Philippines in the spring of 1974 she underwent an overhaul in Pearl Harbor in 1975 and was active in mainly local operations in 1976. Morton deployed again to the Pacific on 17 February 1977. During this cruise, the warship participated in ASW exercises off Taiwan and sailed into the Indian Ocean to visit Kenya and Iran, before returning home on 28 September. She deployed again on 11 September 1978, operating off Japan, South Korea and Taiwan, before sailing for home on 7 March 1979. On 3 May 1980, Morton began another overhaul, completing the yard work and refresher training by the summer of 1981.

Morton sailed on her last deployment in February 1982, during which she participated in five major ASW exercises with U.S. and allied naval forces. On two occasions, the warship aided Vietnamese refugees—rescuing 18 men on 9 June and 52 men, women and children on 10 June—for which Morton received the Humanitarian Service Medal. The warship returned home to Pearl Harbor, Hawaii on 12 August.

== Fate ==
Morton decommissioned at Pearl Harbor on 22 November 1982. Her name was struck from the Navy List on 7 February 1990 and the ship was sold to Southwest Recycling, Inc., Terminal Island, Calif., for scrapping on 17 March 1992. During the scrapping process, the commercial diving crew responsible for removing the struts, shafts and wheels of the Morton set the current (as of 2007) world record for the thickest piece of steel cut underwater by means of an ultra-thermic torch. While cutting the starboard shaft, it was discovered that the Morton's shafts deviated from the blueprints provided to Southwest Marine & Recycling. Specifically, the shafts were to have a wall thickness of two inches (2.0"); however, upon being cut, the shafts were found to be almost completely solid, consisting of a wall of 19.2" inches around a 2.0" hollow cylinder. It is believed the shafts deviated from specifications because of material shortages, requiring use of an inferior alloy, but this has not been confirmed.

== See also ==
- List of destroyers of the United States Navy
