= USS Du Pont (DD-941) =

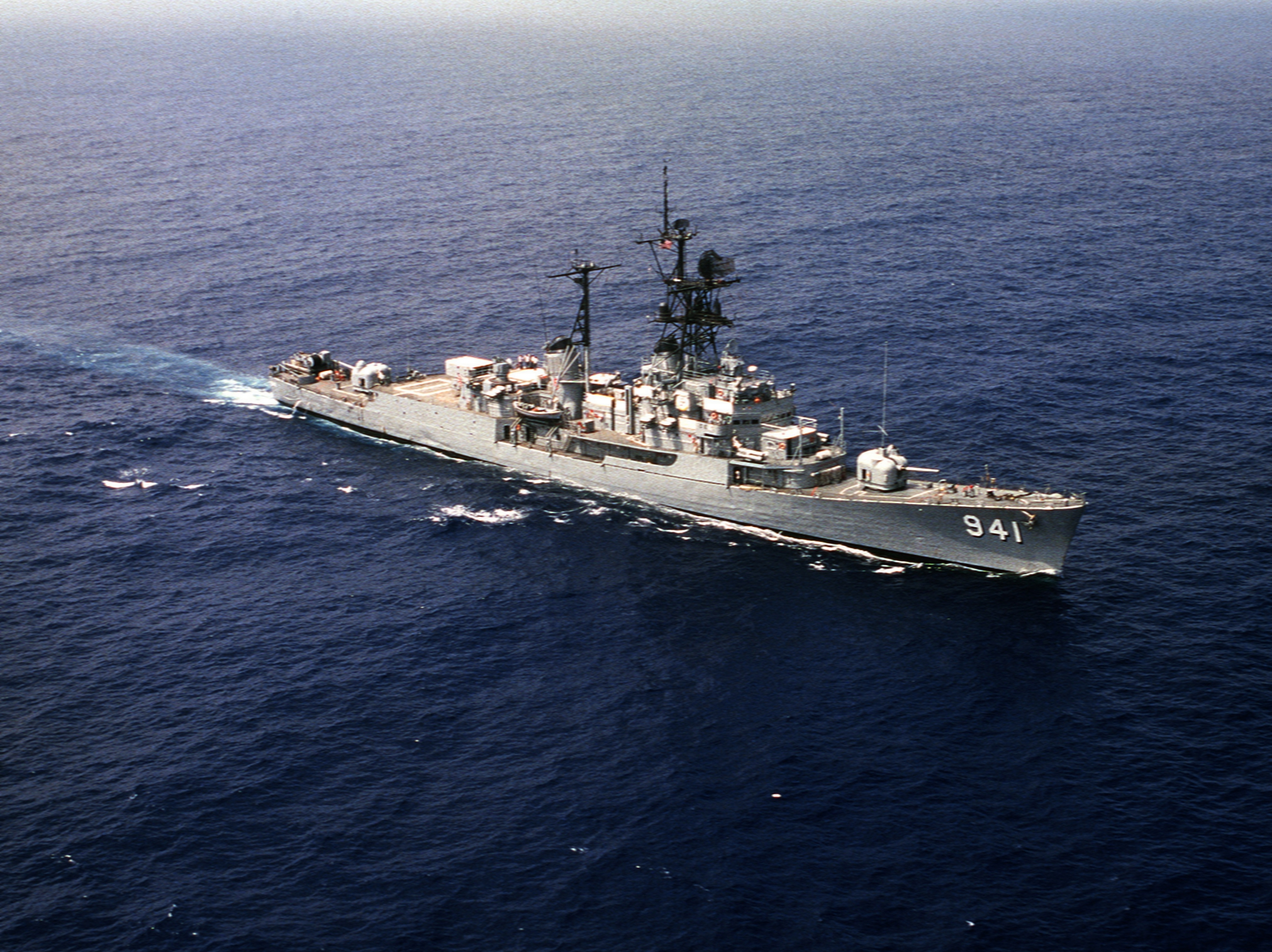
- Du Pont off the coast of Lebanon, 1982.

History

United States
- Name: Du Pont
- Namesake: Samuel Francis Du Pont
- Ordered: 30 July 1954
- Builder: Bath Iron Works
- Laid down: 11 May 1955
- Launched: 8 September 1956
- Acquired: 21 June 1957
- Commissioned: 1 July 1957
- Decommissioned: 4 March 1983
- Stricken: 1 June 1990
- Fate: Sold for scrap on 10 February 1999

General characteristics
- Class & type: Forrest Sherman-class destroyer
- Displacement: 2,800 tons standard.; 4,050 tons full load.
- Length: 407 ft (124 m) waterline, 418 ft (127 m) overall.
- Beam: 45 ft (14 m)
- Draft: 22 ft (6.7 m)
- Propulsion: 4 × 1,200 psi (8.3 MPa) Babcock & Wilcox boilers, General Electric steam turbines; 70,000 shp (52,000 kW) (52 MW); 2 × shafts.
- Speed: 32.5 knots (60.2 km/h; 37.4 mph)
- Range: 4,500 nautical miles (8,300 km) at 20 knots (37 km/h)
- Complement: 15 officers, 218 enlisted.
- Armament: 3 × 5 in (127 mm)/54 calibre dual purpose Mk 42 guns; 4 × 3 in (76 mm)/50 calibre Mark 33 anti-aircraft guns; 2 × mark 10/11 Hedgehogs; 6 × 12.75 in (324 mm) Mark 32 torpedo tubes.

USS Du Pont (DD-941), named for Rear Admiral Samuel Francis Du Pont USN (1803–1865), was a Forrest Sherman-class destroyer built by the Bath Iron Works Corporation at Bath in Maine and launched by Mrs. H. B. Du Pont, great-great-grandniece of Rear Admiral Du Pont; and commissioned 1 July 1957, Commander W. J. Maddocks in command.

== History ==
From 6 to 31 July 1958 Du Pont served on a midshipman cruise and antisubmarine exercises in the Atlantic, duty broken by a visit to New York. Du Pont sailed 2 September for a tour of duty with the 6th Fleet in the Mediterranean Sea, during which she participated in highly realistic air defense and antisubmarine warfare problems. She returned to Norfolk 12 March 1959, to prepare for Operation "Inland Seas," the historic first passage of a naval task force into the Great Lakes through the Saint Lawrence Seaway. She escorted the royal yacht HMY Britannia with Queen Elizabeth II of the United Kingdom embarked during the dedicatory ceremonies on 26 June.

Du Pont crossed the Atlantic in August and September 1959, visiting Southampton, England, after serving as plane guard for the transatlantic flight of President Dwight D. Eisenhower. On 28 January 1960 Du Pont sailed from Norfolk for a second tour of duty with the 6th Fleet in the Mediterranean, returning on 31 August for an overhaul in the Naval Shipyard where she remained through the end of 1960.

Fleet exercises in the Caribbean Sea, operations along the Atlantic Coast, and enforcing the quarantine during the Cuban Missile Crisis carried Du Pont to April 1963 when she served as the command ship during the search for the submarine USS Thresher that foundered off Boston on 10 April. She finished 1963 as the only destroyer in the Atlantic Fleet to win four successive "E"s in Engineering. Her fifth Mediterranean cruise began in November and continued into 1964.

After another Mediterranean deployment, she was the first ship to reach the Gemini 5 space capsule after it landed, and her crew stood by to ensure that both astronauts and capsule were recovered safely. She was also the first vessel ever to recover the booster section of a space shot launch rocket, which she carried back to Norfolk lashed to her fantail. While in Santo Domingo during the Dominican Republic crisis, Du Pont earned a golden "E" to commemorate her sixth consecutive Engineering 'E'. Operations with the Sixth Fleet and NATO forces took up the first half of 1966, followed by a Caribbean cruise and the award of her seventh Engineering 'E', an unprecedented feat.

Du Pont's first Vietnam deployment began in August 1967 on the gun line in support of U.S. Marines fighting at the Demilitarized Zone. Under constant threat from enemy shore batteries, her gunners shelled enemy positions day and night. On 28 August, the enemy fired on the destroyer Robison, which was between Du Pont and the beach. As Robison maneuvered to seaward, Du Pont returned fire, immediately replacing it as a target for some twenty 130 mm (5 in) rounds. One shell found its target, hitting the Mount 52 gun. The burst sent shrapnel into the mount and down through the superstructure to the after deckhouse, killing FN Frank L. Ballant and wounding eight others. Despite the casualties to men and ship, Du Pont continued on station for another two weeks before heading for Subic Bay and repairs. Under fire once more when she returned to the gun line on 10 October, she successfully avoided being hit. On 10 November, the eight men wounded on 28 August received Purple Heart medals, and two days later, the ship left for her last trip to the gun line. At the end of seventy-five days in combat, Du Pont's 5-inch guns had fired 20,000 rounds. Returning to Norfolk in January 1968, she went into dry dock for repairs followed by operations with the Apollo recovery force, exercises in the Caribbean, and midshipman training. By summer's end, her engineering department had racked up its ninth departmental excellence award.

Back in the Far East on 10 October 1968, she began twenty-six days on the gun line supporting SEAL reconnaissance teams and ARVN units in the Mekong Delta. Later in the Gulf of Siam, she fired on a Vietcong-held island, supported a swift boat sweep up the Ông Đốc River estuary, and provided gun fire support in the I Corps area and around Da Nang. In mid-December, her guns covered an amphibious landing to the south.

Returning to combat in January, her gunners supported the 1st Marine Division at Da Nang, covered a four-day amphibious landing to the south, and then again shelled enemy positions around Da Nang and in the Mekong River Delta. When she left Vietnam that spring, Du Pont's guns had fired 30,000 rounds, damaging or destroying more than 730 military structures, and 131 small craft, not to mention causing multiple fires and explosions. Following her return to Norfolk, she entered the Boston Naval Shipyard and decommissioned on 23 May 1969 for antisubmarine warfare modernization.

Recommissioned on 9 May 1970, she returned to Norfolk and in April 1971, began antisubmarine warfare and routine operations along the Atlantic Coast, in the Caribbean, and the Mediterranean. In 1972, she won the Marjorie Sterrett Battleship Fund Award for the Atlantic Fleet. In 1979, Du Pont was relocated to the Bethlehem Steel Works Ship Yard in Hoboken, New Jersey, where the destroyer underwent a major refit. In 1980, the ship got underway and was attached to Comdesron 2, under the command of Cmdr. Harlan K. Ullman.

Following the refit, the ship sailed for its home port of Norfolk, Virginia, before going to Guantanamo Bay, Cuba. Under Cmdr. Ullman's command, the crew participated in two weeks of refresher training, simulating wartime conditions. The crew of Du Pont received three of the Battle "E's".

Du Pont off the coast of Iran in Persian Gulf during Mail Call flight

In 1981, Du Pont went to the Middle East, sailing through the Suez Canal into the Red Sea then to the Persian Gulf. The ship was assigned to the Nimitz battle group, remaining on patrol in the Persian Gulf following the release of American hostages held in Iran. The ship was continually on alert, as Iranian P-3 Orions, originally supplied by the United States, would survey the gulf to track U.S. ship movements.

In 1982, Du Pont was assigned to assist Israel, after the confrontation took place between Israeli forces and the Palestine Liberation Organization. The ship remained off the coast of Beirut for nearly 100 days, lending naval gunfire support. Du Pont was stationed off the coast of Lebanon longer than any other U.S. Navy ship.

== Fate ==
Du Pont was decommissioned on 4 March 1983 and sold for scrap on 11 December 1992 to the Fore River Shipyard and Iron Works.
