= USS Richard S. Edwards =

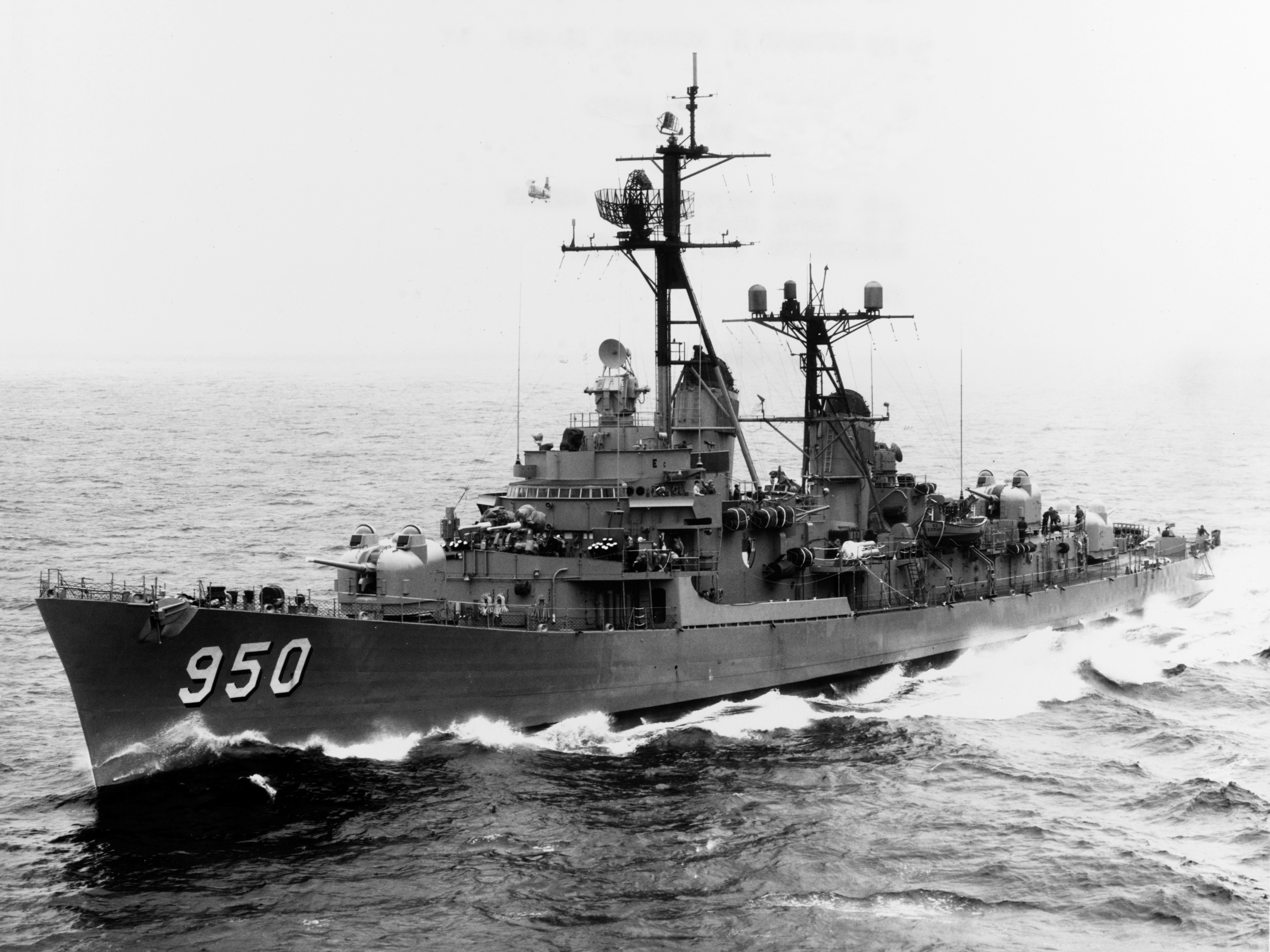
- Richard S. Edwards in 1962

History

United States
- Namesake: Richard Stanislaus Edwards
- Ordered: 27 January 1956
- Builder: Puget Sound Bridge and Dredging Company
- Laid down: 20 December 1956
- Launched: 27 September 1957
- Acquired: 30 January 1959
- Commissioned: 5 February 1959
- Decommissioned: 18 December 1982
- Stricken: 7 February 1990
- Fate: Sunk as a target off Kauai in Hawaii on 10 April 1997 or 12 May 1997

General characteristics
- Class & type: Forrest Sherman-class destroyer
- Displacement: 2,800 tons standard.; 4,050 tons full load.
- Length: 407 ft (124 m) waterline, 418 ft (127 m) overall.
- Beam: 45 ft (14 m)
- Draft: 22 ft (6.7 m)
- Propulsion: 4 x 1,200 psi (8.3 MPa) Babcock & Wilcox boilers, Westinghouse steam turbines; 70,000 shp (52 MW); 2 x shafts.
- Speed: 32.5 knots (60.2 km/h; 37.4 mph)
- Range: 4,500 nautical miles (8,300 km) at 20 knots (37 km/h)
- Complement: 15 officers, 218 enlisted.
- Armament: 3 x 5 in (127 mm)/54 calibre dual purpose Mk 42 guns; 4 x 3 in (76 mm)/50 calibre Mark 33 anti-aircraft guns; 2 x mark 10/11 Hedgehogs; 6 x 12.75 in (324 mm) Mark 32 torpedo tubes.

USS Richard S. Edwards (DD-950), named for Admiral Richard Stanislaus Edwards USN (1885–1956), was a Forrest Sherman-class destroyer built by the Puget Sound Bridge and Dredging Company at Seattle, Washington and launched on 24 September 1957 by Mrs. W. B. Franke; and commissioned 5 February 1959.

Richard S. Edwards served as plane guard for carriers on Yankee Station in the Tonkin Gulf, participated in Sea Dragon operations, patrolled on search and rescue duties and carried out Naval Gunfire Support missions during the Vietnam War and underwent an ASW modernization at the Long Beach Naval Shipyard between 27 February 1970 and 15 January 1971.

== History ==
Richard S. Edwards shakedown cruise in 1959, took her to Mazatlan Mexico, the Panama Canal and to Valparaíso, Chile. While returning from Valparaíso, the newly installed boilers started to spring leaks. Of the four boilers, three were leaking so bad, that the ship had to return to Seattle on one screw. The following year, on 11 August, the Richard S. Edwards, was refueling alongside the aircraft carrier USS Bennington, when the Bennington suddenly veered to the left, and the Edwards attempted to follow the Bennington. Then the Bennington returned again to its original course. This caused the Bennington to sideswipe the Edwards as it attempted to go full back. This caused extensive damage to the deck housing on the port side of the Edwards and partially destroyed the galley and wiped a long gash to the deck housing on the port side of the ship. This action also caused the triple torpedoes to end up on the carrier elevator. There were no injuries aboard the Edwards because of the quick action of Third Class Boatswains Mate, Lionel Sepulveda, a 12-year veteran, anticipating the imminent collision, announced over the PA system that all personnel clear the port side. There were no injuries other than a bruised shin when one of the sailors aboard the Edwards bumped his shin jumping over a mess table. The collision damage is the reason the ship had to enter the Naval Shipyard at Terminal Island, Long Beach California, the Edwards then went to its homeport, San Diego.

On one WestPac cruise, the Edwards left Pearl Harbor with 20 Air Force Cadets from the Air Force Academy in Colorado Springs. Edwards was about two days out of Pearl Harbor when she received a distress signal from a seagoing tug that had been towing an aircraft carrier to Japan to be scrapped. The tug was about two days out of port, they sailed into the middle of a typhoon. The aircraft carrier USS Bon Homme Richard also on the scene, Edwards was tasked with rescuing the crew from the tug. Edwards was in the middle of that typhoon for 21 days. Edwards sailed as close to the tug as possible and stood by in case the tug started to sink. Also, the Bon Homme Richard, was attempting to drop food to the sailors on the tug. The Air Force Cadets were having the worst time, and they were sorry they came aboard. The cadets were lying in the passageways and in their bunks in the forward crew compartment, there was a smell of vomit and supposedly a lot of green vomit was on the compartments decks. Risbon, a Signalman, on his post on the bridge, said that at one time the ship listed to 47degrees, shook a lot but eventually came back to a more even keel. She then deployed to the Western Pacific area where she operated with the fast carrier units of the 7th Fleet, and as a member of the U.S. Taiwan Patrol Force. She returned to the West Coast, 13 May 1960, and operated there until deploying to the Western Pacific again in February 1961 to operate with the fast carrier group in the South China Sea. She returned to San Diego, 14 September 1961.

Richard S. Edwards commenced her third WestPac cruise 13 November 1962 for fast carrier operations throughout the western Pacific, returning home in June 1963. She resumed local operations until commencing her fourth WestPac cruise from August 1964 to January 1965. During this deployment Edwards and USS Morton engaged North Vietnamese torpedo boats in the Tonkin Gulf on 18 September, probably sinking several.

Upon returning from the Far East, Edwards operated off the west coast until deploying to WestPac again 1 March 1966 to 26 August 1966. There she rendered naval gunfire support to forces ashore in Vietnam and plane-guarded for U.S. Navy carriers in the Tonkin Gulf. During 1967, she operated off the west coast of the United States until returning to WestPac in August. She arrived at Da Nang, South Vietnam, 3 November 1967. She returned to San Diego 12 March 1968 and spent the balance of that year operating off the west coast.

In late January 1969 Edwards deployed to WestPac again to operate off Vietnam. She returned to San Diego 13 August 1969, until being decommissioned at Long Beach, California on 27 February 1970. She immediately entered Long Beach Naval Shipyard and underwent ASW modernization. By December, she was participating in sea trials in anticipation of her recommissioning, which occurred 15 January 1971. She embarked 4 March for Pearl Harbor, Hawaii, her new home port, and continued operations in that vicinity until April 1972.

Receiving only 72 hours notice, Edwards sailed from Pearl Harbor 10 April 1972 for the western Pacific and deployment off the Vietnamese coast. On 9 May 1972, Edwards led the gunfire strike that preceded the Operation Pocket Money mining of Haiphong Harbor. She remained in the area, either on the gunline or cruising with the carriers as escort and plane-guard, until November. She returned to Pearl Harbor on 10 November 1972, operating out of that port until decommissioned on 15 December 1982.

Richard S. Edwards received six battle stars for service off Vietnam.

== Fate ==
She was decommissioned 15 December 1982, stricken 7 February 1990, and sunk as a target ship off the coast of Kauai on 10 April 1997, or may be 12 May 1997.

== See also ==
- List of destroyers of the United States Navy
