= USS Manley (DD-940) =

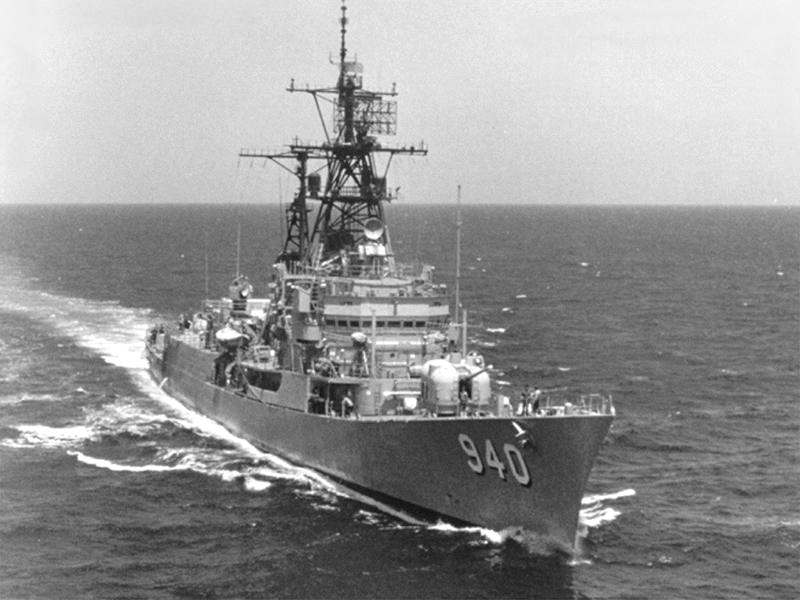
- USS Manley (DD-940), August 1975

History

United States
- Namesake: John Manley (1773 – 1793)
- Ordered: 30 July 1954
- Builder: Bath Iron Works
- Laid down: 10 February 1955
- Launched: 12 April 1956
- Acquired: 25 January 1957
- Commissioned: 1 February 1957
- Decommissioned: 4 March 1983
- Stricken: 1 June 1990
- Fate: Sold for scrap on 11 December 1992.

General characteristics
- Class & type: Forrest Sherman-class destroyer
- Displacement: 2,800 tons standard. 4,050 tons full load.
- Length: 407 ft (124 m) waterline, 418 ft (127 m) overall.
- Beam: 45 ft (14 m)
- Draft: 22 ft (6.7 m)
- Propulsion: 4 × 1,200 psi (8.3 MPa) Babcock & Wilcox boilers, Westinghouse steam turbines; 70,000 shp (52 MW); 2 × shafts.
- Speed: 32.5 knots (60.2 km/h; 37.4 mph)
- Range: 4,500 nautical miles (8,300 km) at 20 knots (37 km/h)
- Complement: 15 officers, 218 enlisted.
- Armament: 3 × 5 in (127 mm) 54 calibre dual purpose Mk 42 guns; 4 × 3 in (76 mm) 50 calibre Mark 33 anti-aircraft guns; 2 × mark 10/11 Hedgehogs; 6 × 12.75 in (324 mm) Mark 32 torpedo tubes.

USS Manley (DD-940), named for Captain John Manley (c.1733–1793), was a Forrest Sherman-class destroyer built by the Bath Iron Works Corporation at Bath in Maine. The keel was laid down on 10 February 1955. Manley was commissioned on 1 February 1957 and sponsored by Mrs. Arleigh A. Burke, wife of then Chief of Naval Operations, the principal speaker at the commissioning ceremonies.

== History ==
Manley departed Newport, Rhode Island, on 11 April for shakedown in the Caribbean. On 7 June, Manley got underway from San Juan, Puerto Rico for a goodwill tour that took her to Lisbon, Amsterdam, Kiel, and Copenhagen. The destroyer returned to the Boston Naval Shipyard on 12 July for repairs and alterations.

Manley left Boston on 22 August 1957 and sortied with an attack carrier strike force destined for a large scale NATO Fleet Exercise "Strike Back." She arrived in the Firth of Clyde, Scotland, on 14 September for a liberty stop. Three days later, she was underway conducting simulated war tactics as it steamed off the coast of Norway north of the Arctic Circle. After exercises with the carrier force, Manley returned to Norfolk on 24 October 1957. Later, assigned to DesDiv 41, she became the flagship for DesRon 4.

On 4 December 1957, Manley set sail for a tour with the Sixth Fleet accompanied by the Gearing, McCard, and Vogelsang. Manley practiced simulated antisubmarine warfare attacks with the squadron while en route but was diverted on 11 December through heavy seas toward the Azores where an aircraft had been reported down, Manley took her position in a futile search. In the early morning hours of 12 December, the destroyer was broadsided by a tremendous wave, killing two, injuring several others, and impacting heavy damage to the galley, radio and radar rooms when she suffered flooding. Enduring northwesterly gusts up to 80 knots, Manley battled through heavy rain squalls and mountainous seas toward Lisbon to arrive at night on 13 December for emergency treatment of the injured and repairs to the vessel. She moved to Gibraltar on the 18th and underwent voyage repairs in the Royal Dockyard of Gibraltar until 4 January 1958, then headed via Bermuda for Norfolk arriving on the 15th. Eventually, she entered the Naval Shipyard in Philadelphia for more permanent repairs. Four months later on 29 April, Manley returned to Norfolk and resumed her role as the flagship of DesRon 4.

On 6 June 1958, Manley set sail with the squadron for an Atlantic Fleet operation that included midshipmen training, implementation of the President's people-to-people programs, and visits to foreign ports of call. She visited among other ports, Kiel, Germany and Copenhagen, Denmark, and Antwerp, Belgium while escorting the aircraft carrier USS Lake Champlain (CV-39).

Returning to Norfolk on 2 October, she was soon underway with the USS Intrepid to join the Second Fleet in maneuvers off the coast of San Juan, Puerto Rico. Following those operations, she took her position as plane guard for the USS Franklin D. Roosevelt during operations up the eastern seaboard to the Virginia Capes.

The first half of 1959 saw Manley with the Surface Antisubmarine Development Detachment at Guantanamo Bay. On 1 March, Manley's and DesRon's Four homeport was officially changed to Charleston, South Carolina. After six months of upkeep and maintenance, the squadron was underway for the Mediterranean and anti-submarine deployment. She participated alongside her British counterparts in "Long Haul," and with the French in operation "Boomerang."

After an extensive overhaul in the Charleston shipyard, Manley was again underway on 21 July 1960 for firing exercises off Culebra Island in the Caribbean. On 27 July she took her position at station number five on the Atlantic Missile Range for the test firing of a Mercury space capsule. Then, she headed eastward to Cardiff, Wales, and participated in experimental antisubmarine warfare patrols and attack team exercises en route to stateside. After completing a short stint of operations off the coast of Jacksonville, Florida, Manley turned for Pollença Bay, Mallorca. Joining the USS Forrestal (CVA-59) task force at Beirut, Lebanon, she joined in Sixth Fleet maneuvers.

In November, she rendezvoused with the Franklin D. Roosevelt to take part in patrols south of Hispaniola. Early in 1962, the destroyer spent a fortnight on Project Mercury operations followed up a week later underway in support of the Independence in night operations in the North Atlantic. Twice within three days her crew rescued downed pilots at night. One of those pilots, now retired Captain Bill Brandel of Fairfax, Virginia, appeared at the Capitol 2001 Reunion on Sunday, 28 October 2001, nearly thirty years later, to extend his gratitude to several of those who participated in his rescue.

On 28 September 1962, Manley headed for Guantanamo Bay for refresher training and rescued a downed helicopter pilot. She spent most of October and November operating in the waters of Cuba during the Cuban Missile Crisis. While returning home, the destroyer again came to the rescue of three men of yacht, Avian, adrift in the Atlantic.

Late in January 1963, she sailed to the Caribbean for operation "Springboard '63." After ASW exercises with the aircraft carrier USS Essex, joint Canadian-American ASW exercises took her to Halifax, Nova Scotia. In October, Manley again departed for a Mediterranean deployment. She was honored to be selected as SIXTH Fleet's flagship during a three-day visit to Tunis. In December, she saw operations with the Middle East Force. On 13 January 1964, Manley dispatched her then Executive Officer, Lieutenant Commander Joseph E. Murray Jr. to negotiate with armed rebels in Zanzibar. Along with a small band of sailors, Murray successfully walked away with 91 American citizens held hostages by the guerrillas.

Following routine upkeep in Charleston, she resumed operations off the Atlantic coast in May and on 6 January 1965 returned to the Mediterranean, representing the United States during the tenth anniversary celebrations of CENTO in Iskenderum, Turkey. During her homeward voyage, Manley spotted the collision of Kaskaskia and the Liberian tanker SS World Bond near St. Helena. Manley rescued 23 World Bond passengers and crew from the murky waters. Her emergency teams fought on board fires and flooding and saved the ship.

On 9 August, Manley took her recovery station for the space flight of Gemini V. For the next year, she operated in various combat scenarios off the Carolina coasts in preparation for then unknown operations in Southeast Asia. Departing Charleston on 5 October 1966, she joined DesRon 20 at Gitmo, and soon afterwards set her bow for Vietnam. En route, she assisted the ill captain of the Greek merchant ship, Marcetta. On 21 November, Manley relieved USS Hull in Da Nang as a unit of TU 70.8.9, a gunfire support group of the Seventh Fleet. Manley provided distinguished support of the ground forces until 7 December when a powder case ignited in the breech of mount 51, her forward gun mount. The resulting fire and explosion tore the mount apart and endangered the magazines. Damage control snuffed out the blaze before extensive damage occurred. The casualties were evacuated by helicopter and the destroyer steamed to Da Nang to disembark the visiting Senator Henry M. Jackson.

After Subic Bay repairs, Manley joined up with USS Enterprise and USS Bainbridge in the Gulf of Tonkin and operated there until assigned to TG 77.4 for ASW work with USS Bennington. Awarded the Navy Unit Commendation for sustained meritorious service in operations against the enemy during her deployment in Southeast Asia, Manley returned to Charleston in May 1967.

After a brief stay in her homeport, Manley again departed for the Western Pacific and combat duty in September. Her second Vietnam engagement was to last eight and one-half months until she returned to Charleston in June 1968.

The destroyer was decommissioned on 31 January 1970 to undergo prolong antisubmarine warfare modernization at the Philadelphia Naval Shipyard. Extensive improvements to sensors, weaponry, communications, and crew habitability were accomplished and on 19 April 1971, she was recommissioned and joined CruDesFlot 4 in Norfolk. Following her shakedown deployment in Guantanamo in the spring of '72, Manley joined DesRon 12 and took part in the program to forward deploy ships in overseas homeports. DesRon 12 and Manley entered their new homeport, Athens, Greece, on 1 September 1972. During the next thirty months, she was called upon frequently to participate in speed contingency exercises: the October 1973 Arab-Israeli and Cyprus crisis of 1974. Manley became the first United States warship to visit İzmir, Turkey, in December 1973. On 22 July 1975, the destroyer headed for a scheduled upkeep and maintenance in Philadelphia and in December 1976, was home ported to Mayport, Florida.

After finishing refresher training in March 1977, she commenced operations as a unit of the Second Fleet followed by a Sixth Fleet deployment from November 1977 until July 1978. Her operating cycle was continued with another Med and Northern Europe run.

On 8 April 1979 while at Mayport, a fire broke out in the forward boiler room during preparation to get underway. Twelve men were injured of which one later died. The repair cost was estimated at $75 million. On 1 October 1979, the crew became designated "Blue Noses" when they crossed the Arctic Circle.

With an increasing naval presence in the Caribbean Sea, the destroyer operated throughout the area visiting Curaçao, Antilles, Limón, Costa Rica, and Santo Tomas de Castilla. In 1980, she departed Mayport for overhaul in Boston. Following a successful refit and sea trials, Manley was assigned to Newport, Rhode Island, and conducted workup ops in the Narragansett area preparing for REFTRA in Guantanamo Bay.

== Fate ==
From 3 April to 3 May, she conducted FEDEX(?) operations in and around Puerto Rico. On 8 June 1982, the USS Manley departed for what was to be her last cruise. She visited all of the Med ports, assisted in evacuation of civilians from Beirut, Lebanon, during terrorist activities, and transited the Indian Ocean arriving after fifty days at sea in Karachi, Pakistan. From 16 October until 24 November, she joined in MidEastFor exercises. At long last, the Lady headed home arriving on 22 December in Newport to commence decommissioning. On 4 March 1983, the USS Manley (DD-940) was struck for the Navy's active rolls.

When the Fore River Shipyard and Iron Works went bankrupt in the early nineties she was resold to N. R. Acquisition Incorporated of New York City by the Massachusetts Bankruptcy Court and scrapped by Wilmington Resources of Wilmington in North Carolina.
