= Forrest Sherman-class destroyer =

Destroyer class of the US Navy

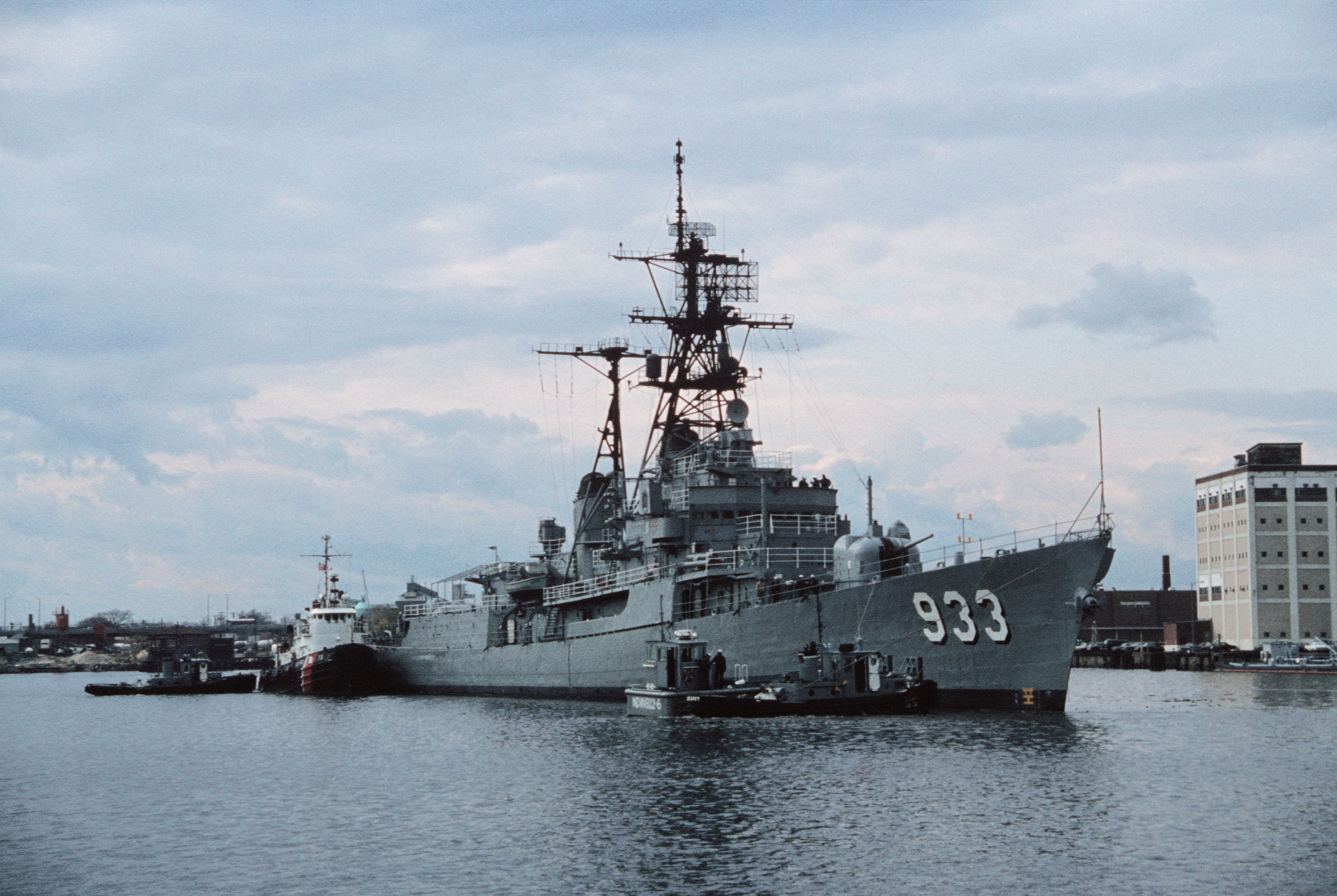
- USS Barry on 16 October 1983

Class overview
- Name: Forrest Sherman class
- Builders: Bath Iron Works, ME (10); Bethlehem Fore River, MA (5); Ingalls Shipbuilding, MS (2); Puget Sound Bridge and Dredging Company, WA (2)
- Operators: United States Navy
- Preceded by: Mitscher class
- Succeeded by: Farragut class
- Built: 1953–1959
- In commission: 1955–1988
- Completed: 18
- Retired: 18
- Preserved: USS Edson; USS Turner Joy

General characteristics
- Type: Destroyer
- Displacement: 2,800 tons standard; 4,050 tons full load
- Length: 407 ft (124 m) waterline; 418 ft (127 m) overall
- Beam: 45 ft (14 m)
- Draft: 22 ft (6.7 m)
- Propulsion: General Electric steam turbines (Westinghouse in DD-931); 4 × 1,200 psi (8.3 MPa) Foster-Wheeler boilers (Babcock & Wilcox in DD-937, DD-943, DD-944, DD-945, DD-946 and DD-948); 70,000 shp (52 MW), 2 × shafts.
- Speed: 32.5 knots (60.2 km/h; 37.4 mph)
- Range: 4,500 nautical miles (8,300 km) at 20 knots (37 km/h)
- Complement: 15 officers, 318 enlisted
- Sensors & processing systems: Mark 56 fire-control system
- Armament: 3 × 5 inch (127 mm) 54-caliber Mark 42 single gun mounts; 4 × 3 inch (76 mm) 50-caliber Mark 33 guns; 2 × Mark 10/11 Hedgehogs; 4 × 21 inch (533 mm) torpedo tubes.

The 18 Forrest Sherman-class destroyers comprised the first postwar class of U.S. Navy destroyers. Commissioned beginning in 1955, these ships served until the late 1980s. Their weaponry underwent considerable modification during their years of service. Four were converted to guided-missile destroyers. This class also served as the basis for the Charles F. Adams-class guided-missile destroyers.

Two ships of the class became museum ships, nine were sunk in training exercises, and the others were scrapped.

== Construction ==
Nine ships were constructed by Bath Iron Works of Bath, Maine, five were built by Bethlehem Steel at the Fore River Shipyard in Quincy, Massachusetts, two were built by Ingalls Shipbuilding at Pascagoula, Mississippi, and two were built by Puget Sound Bridge and Dredging Company in Seattle, Washington. These destroyers were assigned hull numbers 931 to 951, but the series skipped over the numbers used to designate the war prizes DD-934 (the Japanese ex-Hanazuki), DD-935 (the German T35), and DD-939 (the German Z39). DD-927 to DD-930 were completed as destroyer leaders.

== Description ==
At the time they entered service, these ships were the largest U.S. destroyers ever built, 418 feet (127 m) long, with a standard displacement of 2,800 tonnes (2,800 long tons). Originally designed under project SCB 85, they were armed with three 5-inch (127 mm)/54 caliber guns mounted in single turrets (one forward and two aft), four 3-inch (76 mm)/50 caliber antiaircraft (AA) guns in twin mounts, as well as hedgehogs and torpedoes for antisubmarine warfare (ASW). However, over the years, weaponry was considerably modified. The hedgehogs and 3 in (76 mm) guns were removed from all ships during the 1960s and 1970s. In addition the fixed torpedo tubes were replaced by two triple 12.75 in (324 mm) Mark 32 torpedo tube mounts.

Hull and later ships were built under SCB 85A with their fire-control directors reversed from the SCB 85 configuration. They were equipped with B&W Bailey Meter Company's new automatic boiler combustion-control system and a modified hurricane bow/anchor configuration. These ships are listed as Hull-class destroyers in some references.

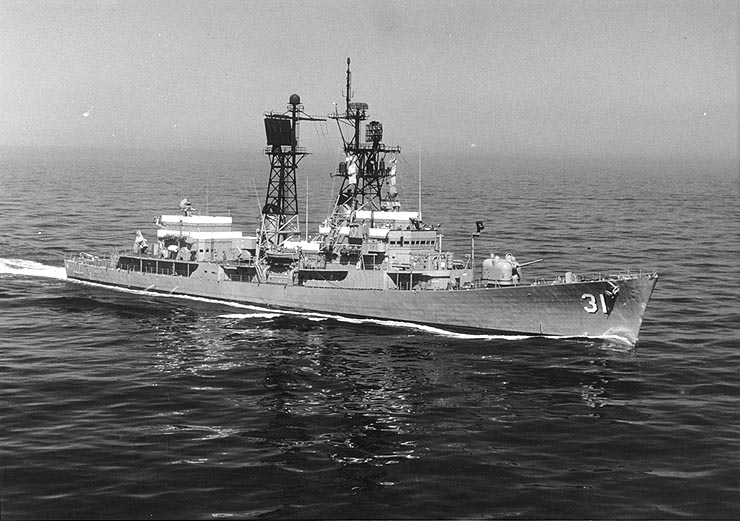
USS Decatur (DDG-31) after conversion to a guided-missile destroyer with one of her aft gun mounts replaced with a Mk 13 missile launcher

=== DDG conversions ===
Four of the destroyers—John Paul Jones, Parsons, Decatur, and Somers—were converted to guided-missile destroyers under SCB 240, armed with Tartar missiles.

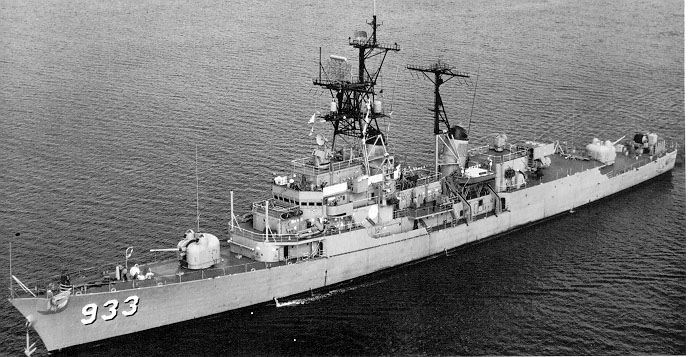
USS Barry (DD-933) with aft gun mount removed and replaced with an ASROC launcher

=== ASW Modernization ===
Eight of the class were modernized to improve their ASW capabilities under SCB 251: Barry, Davis, Jonas Ingram, Manley, Du Pont, Blandy, Hull, and Morton; these ships became known as the Barry subclass. These ships were fitted with an eight-cell ASROC launcher in place of the No. 2 5-inch (127 mm) gun, and with a variable-depth sonar system. Six other ship modernizations were cancelled due to Vietnam War budget constraints.

=== 8-inch/55 Mark 71 gun test ===
As a test platform, the Hull carried the Navy's prototype 8-inch/55 caliber Mark 71 lightweight gun from 1975 to 1978 when the program was canceled, and the 5-inch mount was restored. Hull remains the only modern (post–World War II) destroyer-type ship to have carried an 8-inch (203 mm) gun.

== Disposition ==
Of the 18 completed, nine were disposed of in fleet training exercises, seven were sold by Defense Reutilization and Marketing Service for scrapping, and two became museums.

== Ships in class ==
Ships of the Forrest Sherman destroyer class
Name	Hull no.	Builder	Laid down	Launched	Commissioned	Decommissioned	Fate	Ref
Forrest Sherman	DD-931	Bath Iron Works	27 October 1953	5 February 1955	9 November 1955	5 November 1982	Stricken, sold for scrapping 15 December 2014	
John Paul Jones	DD-932 DDG-32	Bath Iron Works	18 January 1954	7 May 1955	5 April 1956	15 December 1982	Disposed of in support of Fleet training exercise, 31 January 2001	
Barry	DD-933	Bath Iron Works	15 March 1954	1 October 1955	7 September 1956	5 November 1982	Scrapped 11 February 2022	
Decatur	DD-936 DDG-31	Bethlehem Steel, Fore River Shipyard	13 September 1954	15 December 1955	7 December 1956	30 June 1983	Disposed of in support of Fleet training exercise, 21 July 2004	
Davis	DD-937	Bethlehem Steel, Fore River Shipyard	1 February 1955	28 March 1956	28 February 1957	20 December 1982	Disposed of, sold by Defense Reutilization and Marketing Service (DRMS) for scrapping, 30 June 1994	
Jonas Ingram	DD-938	Bethlehem Steel, Fore River Shipyard	15 June 1955	7 August 1956	19 July 1957	4 March 1983	Disposed of in support of Fleet training exercise, 23 July 1988	
Manley	DD-940	Bath Iron Works	10 February 1955	12 April 1956	1 February 1957	4 March 1983	Disposed of, sold by Defense Reutilization and Marketing Service (DRMS) for scrapping, 30 June 1994	
Du Pont	DD-941	Bath Iron Works	11 May 1955	8 September 1956	1 July 1957	4 March 1983	Disposed of, sold by Defense Reutilization and Marketing Service (DRMS) for scrapping, 11 December 1992	
Bigelow	DD-942	Bath Iron Works	6 July 1955	2 February 1957	8 November 1957	5 November 1982	Disposed of in support of Fleet training exercise, 2 April 2003	
Blandy	DD-943	Bethlehem Steel, Fore River Shipyard	29 December 1955	19 December 1956	26 November 1957	5 November 1982	Disposed of, sold by Defense Reutilization and Marketing Service (DRMS) for scrapping, 30 June 1994	
Mullinnix	DD-944	Bethlehem Steel, Fore River Shipyard	5 April 1956	18 March 1957	7 March 1958	11 August 1983	Disposed of in support of Fleet training exercise, 23 August 1992	
Hull	DD-945	Bath Iron Works	12 September 1956	10 August 1957	3 July 1958	11 July 1983	Disposed of in support of Fleet training exercise, 7 April 1998	
Edson	DD-946	Bath Iron Works	3 December 1956	4 January 1958	7 November 1958	15 December 1988	Preserved, first New York from 1989, returned to navy in 2004, purchased as a museum/memorial. Now moored in Bay City, Michigan.	
Somers	DD-947 DDG-34	Bath Iron Works	4 March 1957	30 May 1958	9 April 1959	19 November 1982	Disposed of in support of Fleet training exercise, 22 July 1998	
Morton	DD-948	Ingalls Shipbuilding	4 March 1957	23 May 1958	26 May 1959	22 November 1982	Disposed of, sold by Defense Reutilization and Marketing Service (DRMS) for scrapping, 4 March 1992	
Parsons	DD-949 DDG-33	Ingalls Shipbuilding	17 June 1957	17 August 1959	29 October 1959	19 November 1982	Disposed of in support of Fleet training exercise, 25 April 1989	
Richard S. Edwards	DD-950	Puget Sound Bridge and Dredging Company	20 December 1956	27 September 1957	5 February 1959	18 December 1982	Disposed of in support of Fleet training exercise, 10 April 1997	
Turner Joy	DD-951	Puget Sound Bridge and Dredging Company	30 September 1957	5 May 1958	3 August 1959	22 November 1982	Donated as a museum/memorial, 10 April 1991; now museum in Bremerton, WA	

== See also ==
- List of destroyer classes of the United States Navy

Equivalent destroyers of the same era

- T 47 class
- Daring class
- Akizuki class
- Friesland class
- Halland class
- Impetuoso class
- Kotlin class
- Hamburg class
