= USS John Paul Jones (DD-932) =

Forrest Sherman-class destroyer

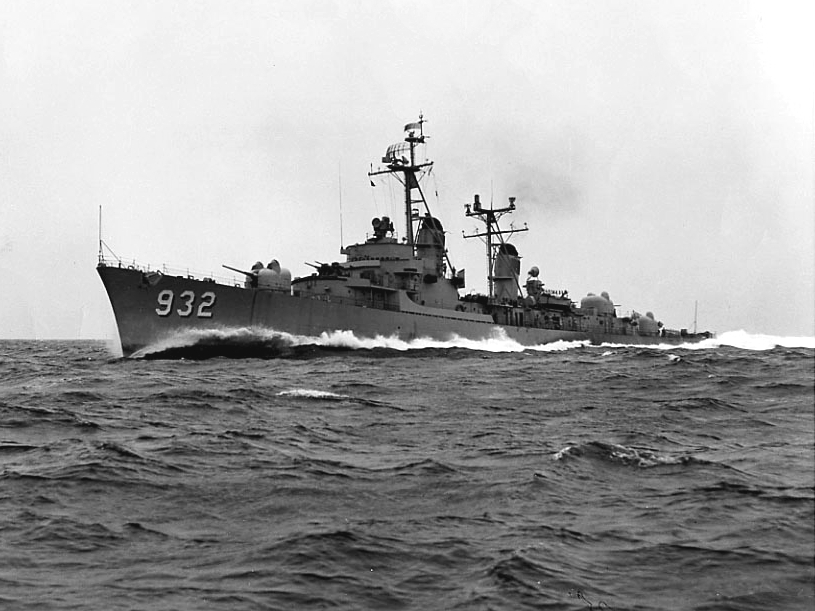
- USS John Paul Jones c. 25 March 1956

History

United States
- Name: USS John Paul Jones
- Namesake: John Paul Jones
- Builder: Bath Iron Works
- Laid down: 18 January 1954
- Launched: 7 May 1955
- Commissioned: 5 April 1956
- Decommissioned: 15 December 1982
- Reclassified: DDG-32, 15 March 1967
- Stricken: 30 November 1985
- Motto: I have not yet begun to fight
- Fate: Sunk as a target, 31 January 2001

General characteristics
- Class & type: Forrest Sherman-class destroyer
- Displacement: 4619 tons
- Length: 418 ft (127.4 m)
- Beam: 44 ft 11 in (14.7 m)
- Draft: 15 ft (4.6 m)
- Propulsion: Geared Turbines, 2 screws
- Speed: 33 knots (61 km/h; 38 mph)
- Complement: 324 officers and enlisted
- Armament: 3 × 5"/54 (127 mm/54) DP gun (3x1); 4 × 3"/50 (76 mm/50) (2x2); 2 Hedgehog ASW Mortars; 4 × 21 inch (533 mm) torpedo tubes (4x1); 6 × 12.75" (324 mm) Mk 32 ASW Torpedo Tubes (2x3); After DDG conversion: 1 × 5"/54 (127 mm/54) DP (3x1); 6 × 12.75" (324 mm) Mk 32 ASW TT (2x3); one Mk 13 Mod 4 single-arm launcher for SM-1MR Standard anti-ship/air missiles (40 round magazine); ASROC

USS John Paul Jones (DD-932/DDG-32), named for John Paul Jones, was a Forrest Sherman-class destroyer of the United States Navy.

John Paul Jones was laid down by the Bath Iron Works Corporation at Bath in Maine on 18 January 1954, launched on 7 May 1955 by Mrs. Carney, wife of Admiral Robert B. Carney and commissioned on 5 April 1956, Comdr. R. W. Hayler, Jr., in command.

== History ==
John Paul Jones, second of the initial class destroyers of post-war design, conducted exhaustive shakedown training out of Guantanamo Bay, Cuba, after which she departed for a cruise to Northern Europe and the British Isles. During this voyage Commander Hayler and members of the crew visited the birthplace of John Paul and presented the ship's emblem to the people of Kirkcudbright. She returned to her home port, Newport, 8 October 1956.

The new destroyer departed for her first cruise with Sixth Fleet 25 March 1957. In May she took part in an operation in support of King Hussein of Jordan. After successfully averting his overthrow, John Paul Jones sailed for Newport once more, arriving 6 June 1957. NATO maneuvers in the North Atlantic followed in October. After another brief cruise to the Mediterranean, she arrived in Fall River, Massachusetts, on 27 November, and in January 1958 she took part in fleet exercises in the Caribbean.

In the spring of 1958 John Paul Jones operated with Canadian ships on training maneuvers in the Atlantic. After further training off the East Coast and in the Caribbean, she sailed again for the Mediterranean 17 March 1959. This tour with the 6th Fleet on its peace-keeping mission ended 24 July when the ship arrived Boston.

The year 1960 began with 2nd Fleet operations out of Newport, and in June the destroyer embarked midshipmen for a training cruise. She then departed 22 August for a cruise to South America. As part of Operation Unitas, she circumnavigated the continent, visiting many of America's southern allies and taking part in joint exercises with their navies. After transiting the Straits of Magellan and the Panama Canal, John Paul Jones returned to Newport 13 December 1960. During 1961 and 1962 the ship carried out antisubmarine exercises in the Caribbean and out of Newport. In April 1962 she took part in a fleet review and weapons demonstration for President John F. Kennedy, and in July she again embarked midshipmen for training. In October 1962 the ship was on station with the Atlantic Recovery Forces during the orbital flight of Commander Wally Schirra, and soon afterward moved off the coast of Cuba during the Cuban Missile Crisis.

The following year saw the veteran ship embark on another Mediterranean cruise 6 February to 1 July; the remainder of 1963 was spent on antisubmarine exercises in the Atlantic.

Operations along the Atlantic Coast continued until John Paul Jones began another 6th Fleet deployment 20 June 1964. She operated primarily in the western Mediterranean, on ASW assignments until returning home 3 September 1964. Early in 1965 she participated in Operation "Spring board" in the Caribbean. In March the destroyer received a Gemini-recovery crane and on the 19th sailed for her recovery station some 200 miles south of Bermuda. She was to pick up astronauts Major Virgil Grissom and Lt. Cmdr. John W. Young and their space craft in the event that they ended their flight after two rather than the three scheduled orbits. However, all went well so she returned to Norfolk 27 March without headlines.

John Paul Jones headed back to the Mediterranean 18 June for NATO exercises with units of the French, Greek and British navies.

John Paul Jones was converted to a guided missile destroyer at the Philadelphia Naval Shipyard between 20 December 1965 and 15 March 1967 and designated DDG-32.

== Fate ==
John Paul Jones was a member of the U. S. Pacific Fleet when she was decommissioned on 15 December 1982. She was stricken from the Naval Vessel Register on 30 November 1985 and sunk as a target off the coast of California on 31 January 2001.
