= USS Somers (DD-947) =

US Navy destroyer

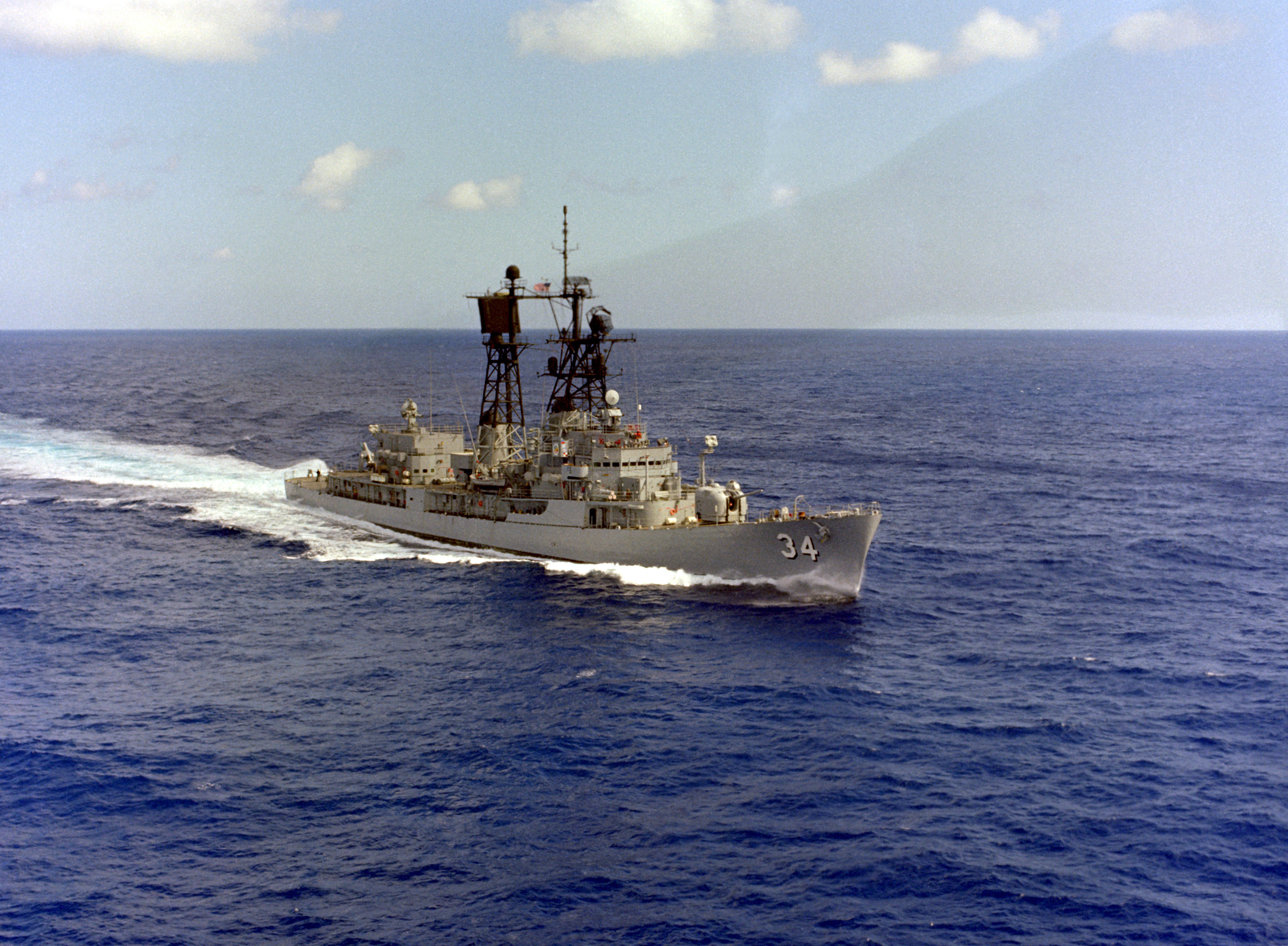
- USS Somers c. early 1980s

History

United States
- Namesake: Richard Somers
- Builder: Bath Iron Works
- Laid down: 4 March 1957
- Launched: 30 May 1958
- Acquired: 1 April 1959
- Commissioned: 9 April 1959
- Decommissioned: 19 November 1982
- Reclassified: 15 March 1967 as a guided missile destroyer
- Stricken: 26 April 1988
- Fate: Sunk as target, 22 July 1998 near Hawaii

General characteristics
- Class & type: Forrest Sherman-class destroyer
- Displacement: 2,800 tons standard.; 4,050 tons full load.
- Length: 407 ft (124 m) waterline, 418 ft (127 m) overall.
- Beam: 45 ft (14 m)
- Draught: 22 ft (6.7 m)
- Propulsion: 4 x 1,200 psi (8.3 MPa) Foster-Wheeler boilers, General Electric steam turbines; 70,000 shp (52 MW); 2 x shafts.
- Speed: 32.5 knots (60.2 km/h; 37.4 mph)
- Range: 4,500 nautical miles (8,300 km) at 20 knots (37 km/h)
- Complement: 15 officers, 218 enlisted.
- Armament: 3 x 5 in (127 mm)/54 calibre dual purpose Mk 42 guns; 4 x 3 in (76 mm)/50 calibre Mark 33 anti-aircraft guns; 2 x mark 10/11 Hedgehogs; 6 x 12.75 in (324 mm) Mark 32 torpedo tubes.

The sixth USS Somers (DDG-34, ex-DD-947) was a Forrest Sherman-class destroyer when her keel was laid down at the Bath Iron Works on 4 March 1958, she was launched on 30 May, and commissioned on 3 April 1959.

Somers was decommissioned 11 April 1966, and converted at San Francisco Naval Shipyard. On 15 March 1967 she was reclassified as a guided missile destroyer, and was re-commissioned 10 February 1968. She was decommissioned on 19 November 1982 and on 26 April 1988, she was stricken from the Naval Vessel Register. On 22 July 1998, she was sunk as target near Hawaii.

== History ==
The sixth Somers was laid down on 4 March 1957 by the Bath Iron Works Corp., at Bath, Maine; launched on 30 May 1958; sponsored by Mrs. Charles E. Wilson; and commissioned on 3 April 1959.

On 1 June 1959, the destroyer sailed from Boston, Massachusetts, to Newport, Rhode Island, before departing the United States five days later for her maiden voyage which took her - via Argentia, Newfoundland - to the ports of northern Europe. On her itinerary were Copenhagen, Denmark; Stockholm, Sweden; Portsmouth, England; and Kiel, Germany, where she represented the Navy during the "Kiel Week" festivities. Somers took leave of Europe at Portsmouth, England, and-after stopping briefly at Bermuda and training for five days out of Guantanamo Bay, Cuba-transited the Panama Canal on 19 July. She arrived at her home port, San Diego, California, on 27 July and conducted shakedown training along the California coast for the next six weeks. She underwent final acceptance trials on 17 September; then, completed just over a month of overhaul from 1 October until 8 November.

=== Vietnam service ===
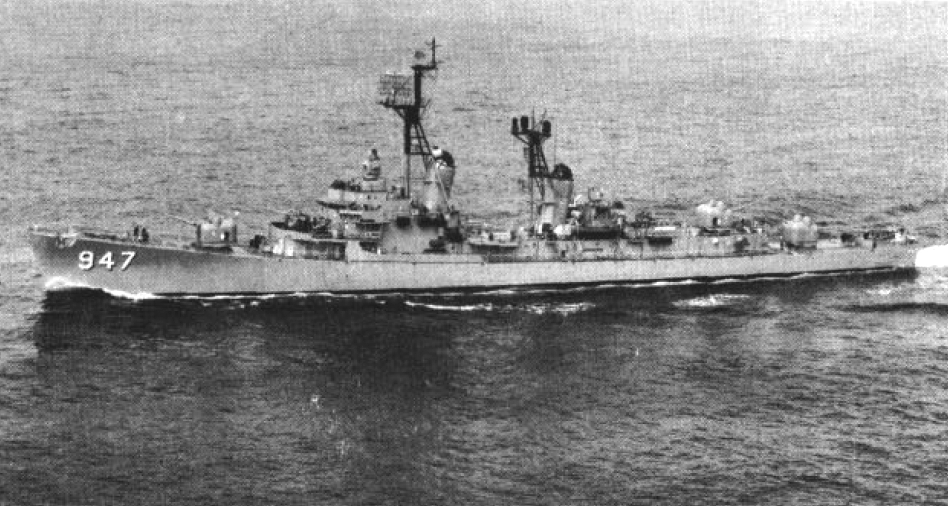
Somers before her modernisation, 1963.

Over the next six and one-half years, Somers alternated between operations out of San Diego and deployments to the 7th Fleet in the Far East. In all, she deployed to the western Pacific four times during this period, remaining on the west coast in 1962 and 1964.

Her first three tours in the Far East were relatively uneventful, peacetime assignments, consisting of 7th Fleet operations and exercises with units of the navies of the SEATO allies of the United States. During her second and third deployments, in 1961 and 1963, Somers steamed to Australia to participate in the celebrations commemorating 19th and 21st anniversaries of the Battle of the Coral Sea. During her fourth tour of duty with the 7th Fleet, the destroyer saw her first wartime operations as American involvement in the Vietnam War escalated. She plied the waters of the Tonkin Gulf, plane guarding for USS Coral Sea, USS Hancock, and USS Ranger as their aircraft pounded enemy supply lines in North Vietnam.

=== Conversion ===
On 30 July 1965, Somers got underway from Yokosuka, Japan, to return to the United States. She arrived in San Diego on 12 August and, after a month of leave and upkeep, she resumed normal operations along the west coast. She continued to be so engaged until 11 April 1966 when she entered San Francisco Naval Shipyard to begin conversion to a guided missile destroyer. On that day, she was decommissioned at Hunters Point. From then until February 1968, Somers was in the shipyard having 90% of her superstructure replaced, installing the AN/SPS-48A 3D air search radar, receiving the Tartar surface-to-air missile system and the ASROC antisubmarine rocket system. In addition, her engineering equipment was completely overhauled, and she received a lot of additional electronic gear. On 10 February 1968, Somers was recommissioned at Hunters Point as the Navy's newest guided-missile destroyer, DDG-34.

Her conversion was completed on 16 May 1968, and she departed Hunters Point the next day for her new home port, Long Beach, Calif. For the rest of 1968 and most of 1969, the guided-missile destroyer ranged the west coast from Mexico to the state of Washington, conducting trials and exercises.

=== Return to Vietnam ===
On 18 November 1969, she got underway to deploy again to the western Pacific. She stopped over in Hawaii from 24 to 28 November and loaded ammunition at the Oahu Naval Ammunition Depot. Continuing westward, she paused at Midway on 1 December to refuel and at Guam on the 8th. She made Subic Bay in the Philippines on the 11th. During this deployment, Somers returned to the Gulf of Tonkin alternately plane guarding Hancock and serving on the gunline. During late March and early April, she joined units of the Australian and New Zealand navies in the SEATO exercise, "Sea Rover." After that, she returned to plane guard duties, this time for USS Constellation. Two days after joining the carrier, however, Somers was detached to return to Subic Bay. She arrived on 19 April and remained until the 24th, when she got underway for the United States.

Somers arrived at Long Beach on 8 May 1970. After an availability period and an extended leave and upkeep period, the guided-missile destroyer embarked 35 Naval Reserve Officer Training Corps midshipmen for five weeks training during PACMIDTRARON 70. The cruise commenced on 22 June and was concluded on 6 August at Long Beach. She resumed operations out of her homeport until 13 November when she got underway for another deployment to the western Pacific. Somers was assigned to the 7th Fleet from December 1970 until 4 May 1971. During that time, she plane guarded the carriers on six occasions, rendered naval gunfire support on three, and once stood watch on the northern search and rescue station. In between line periods, she visited Keelung, Taiwan; Hong Kong; Singapore; and Penang, Malaysia, in addition to putting in periodically at the naval station at Subic Bay.

She cleared the Gulf of Tonkin on 4 May, headed back to the United States, and made Long Beach on the 23d. Somers resumed operations out of Long Beach until 9 July when she began a month of pre-overhaul preparations. On 9 August, the guided-missile destroyer entered Long Beach Naval Shipyard to commence regular overhaul. The overhaul lasted until 3 December and, following that, she went into a period of restricted availability which carried her through 31 December. Somers completed her restricted availability on 3 January 1972 and began trials, tests, and exercises which lasted through 31 March. After nine days of preparations, she headed west on 10 April to rejoin the 7th Fleet.

Sailing via Pearl Harbor and Guam, Somers made Subic Bay on 29 April. After a voyage to Singapore and back, she joined the carriers in the Gulf of Tonkin on 9 May. Her tour of duty in the Far East lasted until late October. She cruised with the aircraft carriers in the Gulf of Tonkin five times during this deployment, rendered naval gunfire support three times, and stood duty on the south Talos station and PIRAZ station once each. Between line periods, she normally put into Subic Bay, but managed to visit Sasebo, Japan, and Hong Kong. Somers returned to Long Beach on 9 November 1972.

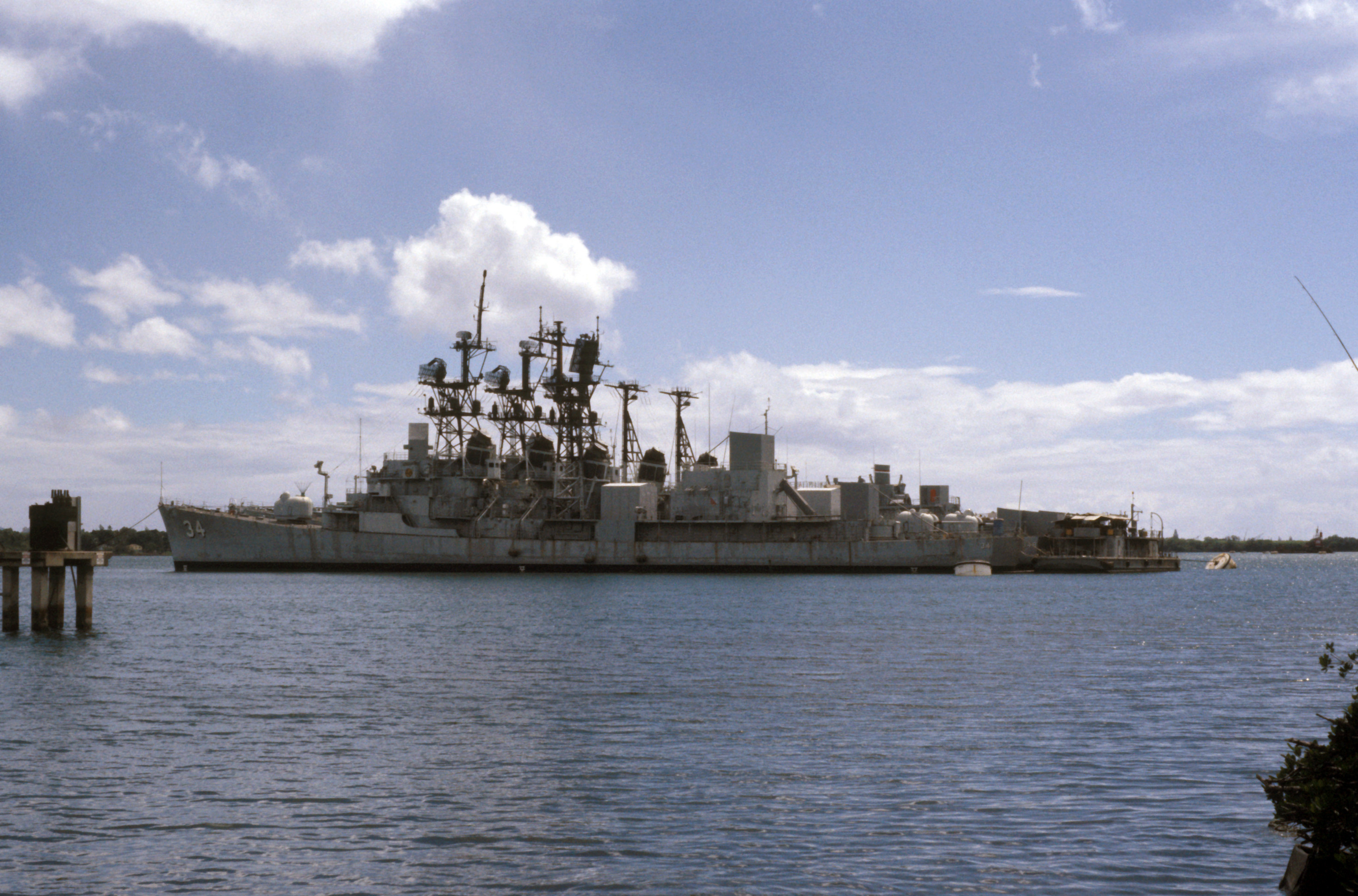
Somers mothballed with other ships at Pearl Harbor.

Two periods of operations from her home port separated by two months of restricted availability at Long Beach took up the first nine months of 1973 for Somers. On 9 October, she got underway to deploy to the western Pacific. On 15 October 1973, SOMERS arrived at her new homeport, Pearl Harbor, Hawaii, en route to her eighth Western Pacific deployment. On this deployment, she made Subic Bay on 5 November. She remained on duty with the 7th Fleet until mid-May 1974, when she reentered Pearl Harbor.

=== Post Vietnam Service ===
SOMERS deployed in November 1978 for her tenth Western Pacific deployment. Upon her return from deployment, she entered the Pearl Harbor Naval Shipyard to undergo a scheduled overhaul (ROH). SOMERS remained in the shipyard for fifty-one weeks and returned to sea on 4 August 1980.

The months following her return to sea were devoted to Engineering, Operations and Weapons System shakedown, tests and ultimate certifications which demonstrated her worthiness to return to Fleet Service.

In early 1981, SOMERS joined Battle Group Charlie and participated in READIEX 5–81 in preparation for the Battle Group s deployment. SOMERS was also a participant in the July 1981 FLEETEX 1-81, the largest U.S. Navy exercise in history.

On 3 November 1981, she deployed with Battle Group Delta headed by USS CONSTELLATION (CV-64). During her eleventh and final deployment, SOMERS operated primarily in the Indian Ocean and made port calls in Guam, the Philippines, Diego Garcia, Bunbury Australia, Maldive Islands and Singapore. After successfully participating in READIEX 2–82 in May 1982, she returned home arriving in Pearl Harbor on 16 May 1982. After returning from this deployment, she was preparing for more operations, when preparations were cut short by the notice that she was to be decommissioned. Somers was decommissioned on November 19, 1982.

During her service, USS SOMERS earned two Marjorie Sterrett Battleship awards, a meritorious Unit Commendation, three Battle Efficiency E awards and presently wears departmental excellence awards.for Supply, Gunnery, Missiles, ASW, CIC, Communications, Electronic Warfare and Damage Control.

SOMERS was relocated to the Inactive Ship Facility at Pearl Harbor until approximately 1988. From there, she was sold to the U.S. Maritime Administration. She was in use at Port Hueneme, California for many years as an experimental ship.

== Sinking ==
On 20 May 1998, Somers was towed from Port Hueneme for the last time. On 21 July 1998, two United States Air Force B-52 Stratofortresses from the 20th Bomb Squadron fired missiles at Somers – adrift in the Pacific Ocean about 30 nautical miles (35 mi; 56 km) northwest of Kauai. Hawaii – as part of the Rim of the Pacific 1998 exercise. Each B-52 crew launched one AGM-142 Have Nap missile, and both missiles hit Somers. On 22 July 1998, an explosive ordnance disposal team rappelled from a helicopter to Somers and sank her with explosive charges; this was shown in a video issued by the RIMPAC 98 public relations officer. Her final resting place is off the coast of Kauai, at 22°21′N 160°58′W. She rests at a depth of 2,800 fathoms (16,800 feet; 5,100 meters).
