= Bausell =

Bausell may refer to:

- USS Bausell, US Navy destroyer
- Lewis K. Bausell (1924–1944), American marine
- R. Barker Bausell (born 1942), American biostatistician

== See also ==
- Bausell and Ellis, Texas, United States, a former census-designated place
