= USS Bausell =

Gearing-class destroyer

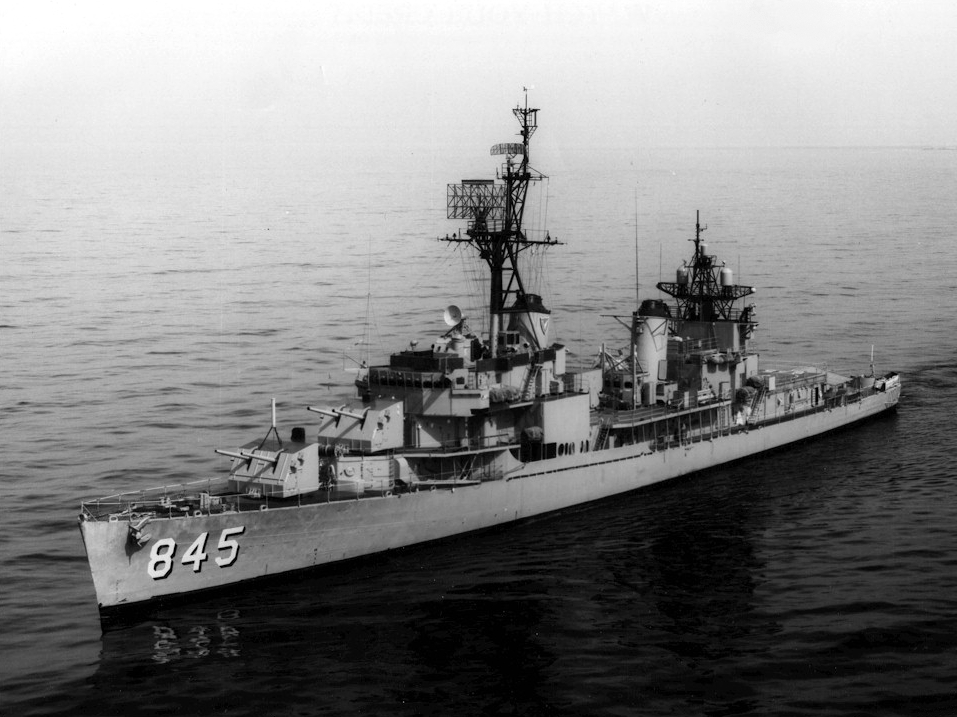
- USS Bausell, 17 June 1965

History

United States
- Name: USS Bausell
- Namesake: Lewis K. Bausell
- Laid down: 28 May 1945
- Launched: 19 November 1945
- Commissioned: 7 February 1946
- Decommissioned: 30 May 1978
- Stricken: 30 May 1978
- Identification: Callsign: NBCA; Hull number: DD-845
- Fate: Sunk as a target, 17 July 1987

General characteristics
- Class & type: Gearing-class destroyer
- Displacement: 2,425 tons
- Length: 390 ft 6 in (119.0 m) (overall)
- Beam: 41 ft 1 in (12.52 m)
- Draught: 18 ft 6 in (5.64 m)
- Propulsion: 2 × geared turbines; 2 × propellers
- Speed: 35 kn (65 km/h; 40 mph)
- Range: 4,500 nmi (8,300 km; 5,200 mi) at 20 kn (37 km/h; 23 mph)
- Complement: 336 officers and enlisted
- Armament: 6 × 5 in (127 mm)/38 caliber guns; 12 × 40 mm (1.6 in) Bofors AA guns; 11 × 20 mm (0.79 in) Oerlikon AA cannons; 10 × 21 in (533 mm) torpedo tubes; 6 × depth charge projectors; 2 × depth charge tracks

USS Bausell (DD-845) was a Gearing-class destroyer in the United States Navy during the Korean War and the Vietnam War. She was named for Marine Corporal Lewis K. Bausell (1924–1944), who was awarded the Medal of Honor posthumously for "conspicuous gallantry" during the Battle of Peleliu.

== Post World War II ==
Bausell was laid down on 28 May 1945 at Bath, Maine, by the Bath Iron Works; launched on 19 November 1945; sponsored by Mrs. Lawrence K. Bausell, Corporal Bausell's mother. She was commissioned at Boston, Massachusetts on 7 February 1946.

After a month fitting out at the Boston Naval Shipyard, the destroyer conducted an eight-week shakedown and training cruise to the West Indies. Returning to Boston on 4 June, the warship underwent four weeks of post-shakedown repairs before sailing for duty with the Pacific Fleet on 5 July. Passing through the Panama Canal soon thereafter, she arrived at her new homeport of San Diego, California on the 23d.

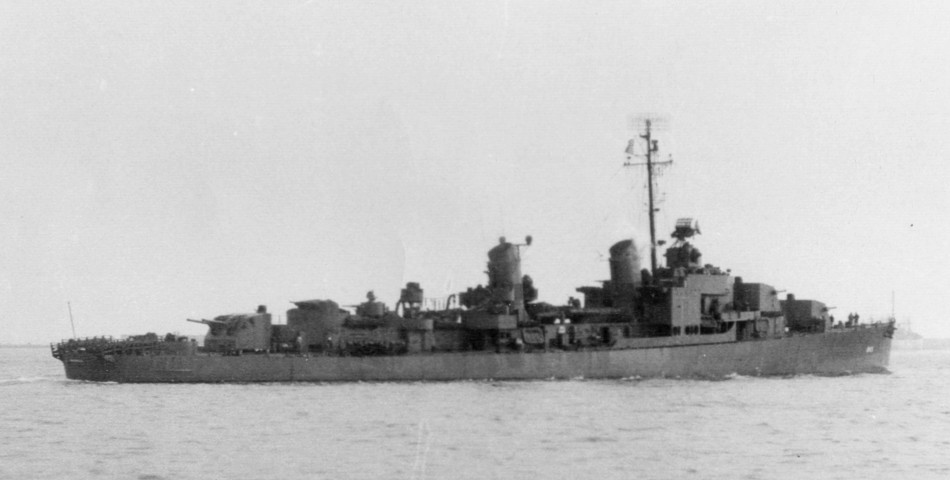
USS Bausell (DD-845) in 1946.

Bausell, although immobilized in port owing to crew shortages, joined Destroyer Division 12 (DesDiv 12) on 30 November. When enough crewmembers became available in January 1947, she began a more active period of local operations out of San Diego. The destroyer participated in fleet exercises held in the Hawaiian Islands in late February; and, in early March, she assisted Tucson in a fruitless search for survivors of the foundered merchantman Fort Dearborn. Ordered to Pearl Harbor on 8 July, she conducted reserve training duty in that port until sailing for Bremerton, Washington, on 1 October. Upon arrival, the destroyer underwent a four-month modernization overhaul.

Bausell returned to San Diego in late February 1948 and prepared for her first Far East cruise. Departing San Diego on 9 March, the warship first steamed to Pearl Harbor for two weeks of antisubmarine (ASW) exercises. Late that month, she got underway for China, arriving at Tsingtao on 15 April. For the next six months, the destroyer ranged the length and breadth of the Yellow Sea, escorting American shipping in the region, until the Chinese government closed the mainland ports to American warships. She returned to San Diego on 26 November.

For the next year, Bausell conducted local operations out of San Diego with DesDiv 12. These continued until 11 November 1949, when she again sailed for the western Pacific. Arriving at Subic Bay on 30 November, Bausell remained in Philippine waters through the end of the year. On 7 January 1950 she set course for the Chinese coast to assist SS Flying Arrow, a merchant ship that had been damaged by gunfire from a Chinese ship and was anchored off the Yangtze estuary. On 10 January, in company with Stickell and HMS Black Swan, the destroyer shielded the merchant ship. Bausell then conducted surveillance operations off the Yangtze estuary, outside Tsingtao, and near the Barren Islands, returning to Subic Bay on 27 January.

== Korean War ==
The destroyer conducted patrols in Philippine and Japanese waters before setting out for the west coast on 20 May. After a leisurely voyage during which she stopped at Guam and Pearl Harbor, Bausell arrived in San Diego on 13 June. She spent the three months after her return engaged in local operations and then entered Mare Island Naval Shipyard for an eight-week overhaul. On 19 February 1951, the destroyer sailed for Korean waters in company with two other DesDiv 12 ships, Agerholm and Richard B. Anderson.

The warship made Sasebo, Japan, on 18 March and, three days later, joined Task Force 77 (TF 77) off the east coast of Korea. Operating with HMS Cockade during this tour, Bausell patrolled the Songjin–Wonsan area for North Korean small craft and conducted shore bombardment missions from 24 to 28 April. Reassigned to the Taiwan Strait Patrol, a presence established in June 1950 to discourage the two Chinese governments from widening the war, the destroyer cruised near the Pescadores Islands from 11 June to 18 July. Returning to Korean waters on 7 August, she engaged in five more weeks of patrol operations before sailing for San Diego on 16 September.

Bausell spent the next seven months conducting local operations, practicing her gunnery, and training new crew members. Underway for Korean waters on 20 May 1952, the destroyer returned to patrol operations with TF 77 off the east coast of Korea. She conducted naval gunfire support as needed, engaging in gunnery duels with shore batteries four times over the course of the summer. On occasion, the warship also screened carrier task forces and carried out planeguard duties in their area of activity. Her tour of duty over, she set course for San Diego early in December, arriving there on the 20th.

On 29 January 1953, Bausell commenced a six-month overhaul at the Mare Island Naval Shipyard. After the repairs were finished in July, the destroyer spent two months conducting refresher training in preparation for her fifth Far East deployment. Departing San Diego on 8 September, she returned to Korean waters and helped other 7th Fleet units monitor the s:Korean Armistice Agreement on the peninsula. Bausell steamed off Korea and Taiwan for six months, putting into such ports as Yokosuka, Pusan, and Keelung infrequently for upkeep and repair. Relieved in late March 1954, she returned to San Diego on 16 April.

The warship made her sixth western Pacific cruise between November 1954 and April 1955. Although initially operating out of Subic Bay, Bausell received orders sending her north after Chinese communist aircraft engaged Chinese nationalist shipping at Ichiang, in the Tachen Islands, on 10 January 1955. The destroyer patrolled the surrounding seas for the following three weeks, while diplomats tried to resolve the crisis. In early February, when the decision was made to evacuate the Chinese nationalists from the islands, she stood by in support of that operation. Following a port visit to Hong Kong and a short repair period at Sasebo, the destroyer returned to the United States early in April 1955.

== Interwar years ==
Over the next four years, Bausell deployed to the western Pacific three more times. During these cruises, she conducted ASW exercises with other 7th Fleet units, patrolled the seas off China and Korea, and trained with other navies in Philippine and Australian waters. This pattern of operations came to be fairly characteristic of a Navy warship's tours of duty in the Far East in the period of relative peace between the Korean War Armistice Agreement in 1953 and the intensification of the Vietnam War just over a decade later.

In July 1960, Bausell entered the Puget Sound Naval Shipyard to undergo alterations as part of the Fleet Rehabilitation and Modernization (FRAM) program. Devised to counter growing numbers of Soviet submarines, the conversion process armed Bausell with antisubmarine rockets (ASROC) and ASW torpedoes, added helicopter equipment and advanced electronics gear, and improved her radar and sonar capabilities.

After these modifications were completed on 15 July 1961, the warship made a short shakedown cruise to Vancouver, British Columbia, before steaming to San Diego. There, for the next 14 months, she conducted sea trials and weapons exercises to test her new equipment. During the summer of 1962, the destroyer visited Seattle for the World's Fair and participated in the Rose Festival in Portland, Oregon.

On 11 May 1962, Agerholm test fired a nuclear ASROC missile towards Bausell to test its capability to withstand the radioactive "base surge" resulting from the underwater explosion. The entire crew disembarked from the ship prior to the test, leaving behind test instruments. The base surge never reached the ship.

== Vietnam War ==
Bausell sailed for the Far East again in November 1962. There, the destroyer spent six months patrolling in the South China Sea and conducting goodwill visits to Singapore, Djakarta, and Darwin. Returning home on 30 June 1963, she carried out local operations out of San Diego into November. Following an extended maintenance period at the Naval Repair Facility, San Diego, Bausell resumed local operations out of that port on 22 March 1964. These activities, including helicopter qualification trials and weapons exercises, continued through July.

On 5 August, the destroyer sailed for duty in the western Pacific. Bausell soon joined other 7th Fleet forces concentrating in the South China Sea. This provided escort services for the growing numbers of American carriers and amphibious units operating off Vietnam. These patrols continued through the new year until the destroyer returned to San Diego in February 1965.

Over the next 11 months, Bausell kept busy fulfilling training and other commitments stateside. These included night planeguard assignments for aircraft carriers off the California coast, intensified ASW training to cope with the new Soviet submarines operating in the Pacific, and a six-week midshipmen cruise to Tacoma, San Francisco, and Pearl Harbor during the summer.

Owing to widened American participation in combat operations in southeast Asia, Bausell set course for Vietnam on 7 January 1966. Her first assignment in the South China Sea consisted of monitoring the movements of the Russian trawler Protractor and preventing that ship from intercepting Navy tactical communications. In addition to providing planeguard and screening services for the carriers Ranger and Ticonderoga, she also served as a naval gunfire support (NGFS) ship and on the Tonkin Gulf search and rescue (SAR) station. In March and April, the destroyer fired over 7,000 5-inch rounds at shore targets; and, in company with the destroyer Worden, the warship also rescued four downed pilots. She then visited Subic Bay and several other Far Eastern ports before steaming for home on 27 June.

Upon returning to San Diego, the warship prepared for a regular overhaul at the San Francisco Bay Naval Shipyard. Beginning on 23 September, shipyard workers modernized her 5-inch gun mounts, reworked the main engineering plant, and overhauled the sonar, fire-control radar, and electronic counter-measures (ECM) gear. After a successful sea trial on 22 December, Bausell began a series of exercises—including gunnery, shore bombardment, planeguard, and helicopter training—that lasted through April 1967.

The warship departed San Diego on 15 May and arrived at Subic Bay on 12 June after visits to Pearl Harbor, Midway, and Yokosuka. Bausell loaded supplies and ammunition, getting underway for "Yankee Station" on 17 June. There, she provided escort and ASW services to the carriers Constellation and Intrepid until 14 July. After a brief call at Sasebo, the destroyer returned to the Gulf of Tonkin and served with the carrier Oriskany until 17 August when she was ordered to the gunline off Vietnam. For the next 10 days, Bausell conducted shore-bombardment missions off Đồng Hới, remaining on call into September. On 13 September, she returned to the Gulf of Tonkin for escort duties. Three weeks later, after an ASW exercise with the submarine Sabalo, she sailed for the west coast, arriving in San Diego on 25 October.

Following 10 months of local operations the warship prepared for her 15th Far Eastern deployment. Departing San Diego on 7 September 1968, Bausell stopped at Yokosuka and Subic Bay, before joining the carrier Coral Sea in the Gulf of Tonkin on 10 October. Four days later, after rendezvous with the cruiser Canberra, the vessel conducted a week of naval gunfire missions against North Vietnamese coastal targets. After returning to the carriers in late October, the destroyer conducted planeguard and ASW assignments on "Yankee Station", served on the gunline off Da Nang, and completed four weeks on SAR station with Worden, before steaming out of the combat zone in February 1969. Although she departed Yokosuka for San Diego on 21 February, she made a brief detour to the Ogasawara Islands on 23 February. There, she rescued the crew of a burning Japanese fishing vessel before resuming her voyage home.

Arriving at San Diego on 4 March, the warship served as an engineering school ship and conducted other local operations until 28 July when she entered Long Beach Naval Shipyard. Completing a three-month overhaul on 4 November, the destroyer resumed local operations out of San Diego.

Bausell returned to the familiar operations off the Indochinese peninsula in June 1970. She served on the northern SAR station, acted as planeguard on "Yankee Station" for the carriers Oriskany and America, and carried out positive identification radar advisory zone (PIRAZ) duty in the Gulf of Tonkin through August. The warship cruised on the gunline in September, firing at targets as needed, and screened the carrier Bon Homme Richard on "Yankee Station" in October. After a brief diversion north to the Paracel Islands to investigate Russian trawler traffic, the destroyer headed for home on 14 November.

Arriving in San Diego on 1 December, the warship spent the first eight months of 1971 either in port at San Diego or conducting local exercises off the California coast. On 1 September, Bausell learned of her assignment to a new home port—Yokosuka, Japan—as part of the Navy's forward deployment program. She departed San Diego on 20 October and moored at Yokosuka on 11 November.

Her first mission, that began on 1 December, took the ship from Sasebo to Subic Bay on an amphibious convoy exercise. While off Taiwan, the destroyer successfully defended the convoy when she scored a simulated ASROC "kill" against the submarine Harder. On 14 December, because of increased tension between East Pakistan, India, and West Pakistan, the task group – which became Task Force 74 – received orders sending it through the Strait of Malacca. The amphibious forces, supported by the carrier Enterprise, cruised off Ceylon in case American citizens needed emergency evacuation. With the Indian Army's intervention in Kashmir and East Pakistan, the fighting soon ended and the crisis ebbed with the establishment of the Bangladeshi government in the former East Pakistan the following month.

Detached from Indian Ocean operations on 6 January 1972, Bausell steamed to the combat zone adjacent to Vietnam. In company with the destroyer Parsons, the ships conducted a naval gunfire support mission off Point Virna before putting into Vũng Tàu on 11 January. At sea again the following day, the warship visited Hong Kong and Okinawa before returning to Yokosuka on 20 January. Bausell remained in Japan for upkeep and training until 18 February when she headed back to Vietnam.

On 4 March, the destroyer joined the carrier Coral Sea on "Yankee Station." She conducted screen and lifeguard operations for several days, dutifully rescuing a man overboard from Camden on 6 March, until ordered to the Vietnamese coast. For the next two months, the warship served on the gunline, firing support missions to aid friendly forces ashore and repeatedly suppressing shore batteries on Hon Matt Island. After a brief call at Yokosuka in mid-May, the destroyer returned to the gunline on the 21st and conducted harassing, interdiction, and illumination fire into June. On 10 June, while off Hon La Island, North Vietnam, the destroyer was hit by a single shell. It started a small fire in an empty ASROC launcher cell, which was quickly put out; and Bausell continued on assigned duties. She returned to Japan in early July.

Over the next four months, the warship served on the gunline three more times, conducting NGFS missions, surveillance duties, and assisting PIRAZ ships. On 28 October, Bausell rendezvoused with the destroyer Cochrane; and, together, they commenced bombardment missions on petroleum storage sites, shore batteries, and roads in the Đồng Hới area. During these operations, which lasted until 7 November, she also fired two "Shrike" radar-homing missiles at North Vietnamese Army (NVA) shore installations. Ordered south to evade a typhoon, the destroyer returned to the gunline on 16 November for eight days of fire support missions before steaming to Yokosuka on 5 December.

Bausell sailed back to the gunline on 22 January 1973, this time off Point Allison near the Vietnamese Demilitarized Zone (DMZ). Underway replenishment kept her on the line, firing at harassment and interdiction targets as well as at the occasional hostile shore battery, until the truce began on 28 January. Following port visits to Bangkok, Thailand, and to Singapore, the warship steamed home to Yokosuka for three weeks of upkeep and repair.

Underway on 22 March, Bausell visited Kobe, carried out gunnery shoots near Okinawa, and conducted ASW exercises with the submarine Sailfish. After a day in Buckner Bay to load fuel and supplies, she joined the destroyers Gurke and Leonard F. Mason for a large combined US/ROKN amphibious exercise off Yang Po Ri, South Korea. The destroyer also visited Hong Kong before returning to Yokosuka on 28 April. Following the 34th Black Ship Festival at Shimoda, Japan, commemorating Commodore Matthew C. Perry's visit to Japan in 1854, the ship entered the Sumitomo Shipyard on 25 June for overhaul.

Completing refresher training on 10 January 1974, the destroyer steamed to Pusan, Korea, for an ASW exercise with the South Korean Navy. Working with South Korean Warships, Bausell practiced tactical coordination and attack procedures against the submarine Darter. For the next several months, the warship operated with the aircraft carrier Midway, conducting carrier operations and type training, from the Philippines to the East China Sea. In May, she escorted an amphibious task force to the Coral Sea for exercises with British, Australian, Fijian, and New Zealand ships. Afterwards, on 18 June, she visited Mackay and Sydney, Australia, before returning to Yokosuka, via Subic Bay, on 21 July.

In September, Bausell conducted ASW exercises with South Korean warships against Sailfish, and visited Sasebo and Hong Kong. She then served as planeguard for Constellation and took the time to shadow and gather intelligence on a Soviet Kresta II-class cruiser. Following a month of upkeep at Yokosuka, the warship returned to the Yellow Sea in late November for more ASW exercises with the South Koreans. After a short period of screening duty with Midway, the destroyer returned to Yokosuka on 20 December.

Bausell continued these types of local operations during the first three months of 1975. She conducted training exercises off Okinawa, visited ports in the Philippines and Taiwan, and screened 7th Fleet aircraft carriers. On 4 April, in company with Coral Sea, the destroyer began a cruise intended to reach into the Indian Ocean and to Australia. The communist advance on Saigon, however, diverted the warships to the Vietnamese coast on 11 April. During the ensuing Operation Frequent Wind, the destroyer screened other Navy ships as they evacuated Americans and South Vietnamese from the Saigon area.

After steaming to Singapore for three days of upkeep and liberty, the task group resumed its cruise to Australia on 11 May. Two days later, the ships received orders to proceed to the Gulf of Siam to participate in the rescue of the hijacked American container ship SS Mayaguez. Bausell supported Coral Sea for the next five days as the carrier provided air support and cover for the marines on Koh Tang Island. In the wake of Mayaguez's release, the task group finally made Australia, with Bausell mooring at Albany on 31 May. Following a week-long visit, the destroyer returned to Yokosuka, via the Philippines, on 22 June.

Over the next six months, the warship confined her operations to the waters around Japan. These included refresher training, escort services with Midway, and participation in Exercise "Tae Kwon Do IX" with elements of the South Korean Navy. The destroyer steamed near Honshū and Hokkaidō in the first two months of 1976, providing escort services for 7th Fleet carriers, before conducting ASW exercises with Japanese Maritime Self Defense Force (JMSDF) warships. Similar operations out of Yokosuka occupied her until October when Bausell and Midway embarked on a two-week circumnavigation of Japan. The transit of the Sea of Japan provoked numerous overflights by Soviet Tupolev Tu-95 Bear D bombers; and, for several days, a Soviet Kanin-class guided missile destroyer shadowed the task group.

On 10 November Bausell began a six-week drydock and repair period at Yokosuka, during which it was determined she would return to the United States the following year for retirement. More than a year of service remained to the destroyer, however, and the warship resumed operations out of Yokosuka in January 1977. These included carrier task force operations in February and March, during which Bausell drew the task of shouldering a persistent Soviet Krivak-class destroyer away from Midway, and more ASW exercises with South Korean and Japanese warships. In June, she participated in "Dolphinex 1–77", an ASW exercise with units of the Philippine Navy. In July, the destroyer made one last visit to Korea and, after a short cruise to the Philippines early in September, Bausell made final preparations at Yokosuka to return to the United States.

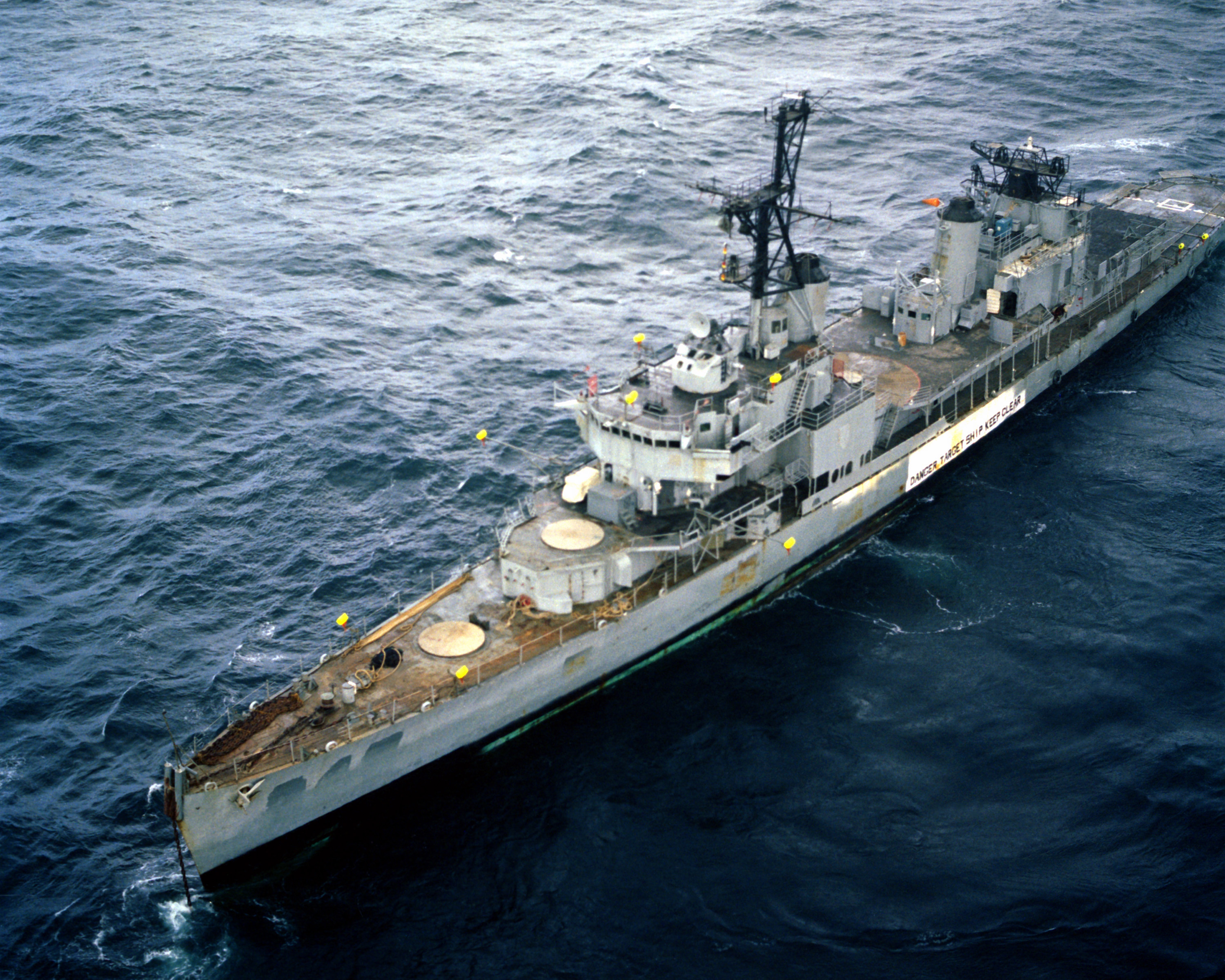
Bausell as a target ship of the Pacific Missile Test Center, 1982

On 26 October, the destroyer left Japan for her last long voyage. She stopped for liberty calls at Keelung, Bangkok, Singapore, and Rabaul, before putting in at Sydney, Australia in late November. After a brief stop at Auckland, the warship pressed on, stopping at Tonga, Fiji, and Pago Pago, American Samoa, before arriving in Hawaii on 31 January 1978. The last leg of the voyage was completed when the warship finally returned to San Diego on 13 February.

The destroyer underwent several inspections before entering fleet standdown status on 15 March. Notified in late March that she would not be sold to a foreign navy, the reduced crew began more drastic inactivation procedures. Bausell was decommissioned on 30 May 1978, and her name was struck from the Navy List that same day. She was transferred to the Pacific Missile Test Center for use in the Harpoon missile development program and was finally sunk as a target on 17 July 1987.

== Awards ==
Bausell received nine battle stars for Vietnam War service. Combat Action Ribbon, Meritorious Unit Commendation With One Star, Battle Efficiency "E", China Service Medal, National Defense Service medal With One Star, Korean Service Medal, United nations Service Medal, Republic of Korea Presidential Unit Citation, Armed Forces Expeditionary Medal, Vietnam Service Medal with Silver Star, Vietnam Campaign Medal With Clasp.

As of 2006, no other ship in the United States Navy has been named Bausell.
