= USS Worden (CG-18) =

Ship of the United States Navy

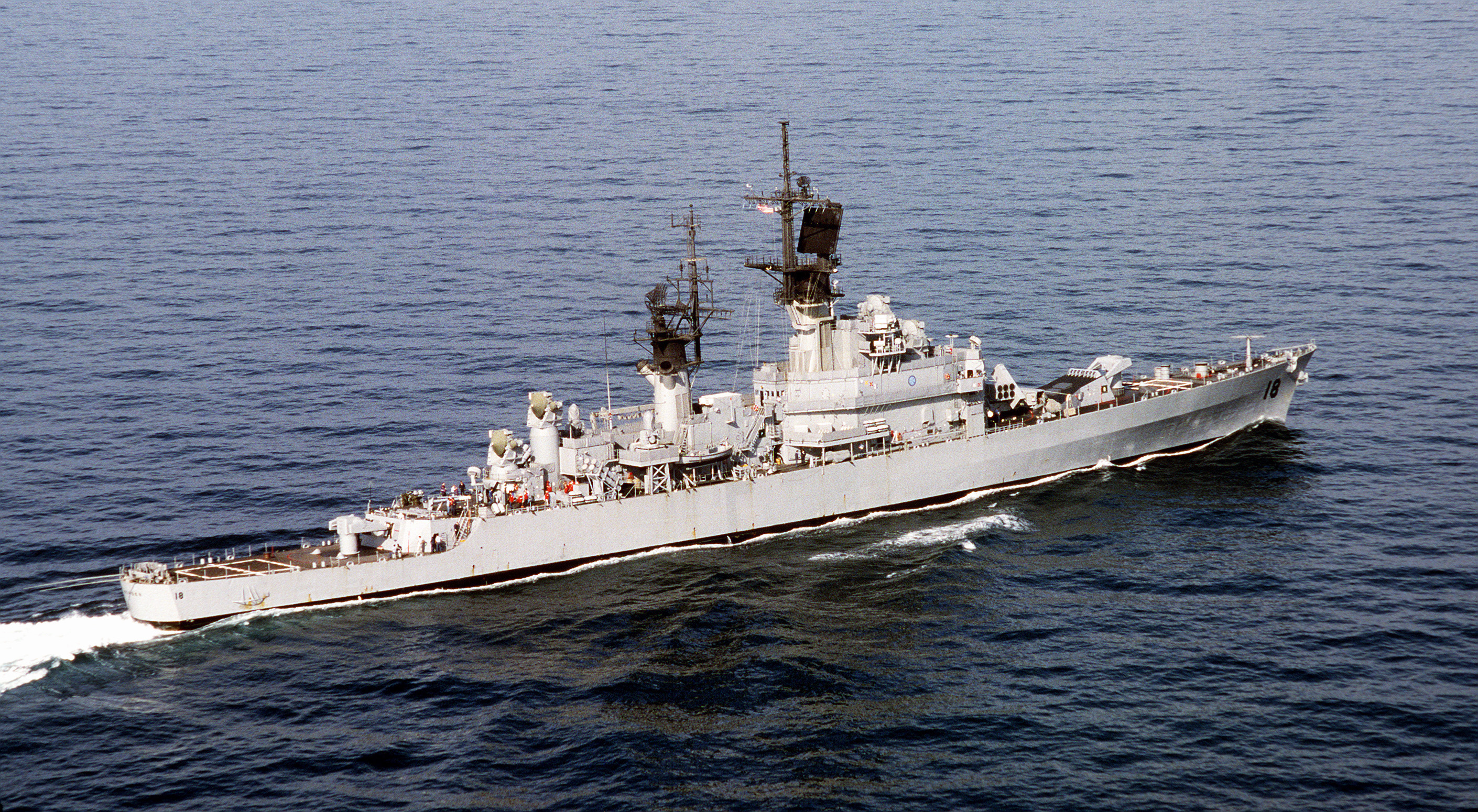
- USS Worden

History

United States
- Name: Worden
- Namesake: John Lorimer Worden
- Ordered: 7 November 1958
- Builder: Bath Iron Works, Bath, Maine
- Laid down: 19 September 1961
- Launched: 2 June 1962
- Sponsored by: Mrs. William R. Smedberg III
- Acquired: 8 January 1971
- Commissioned: 3 August 1963
- Decommissioned: 1 October 1993
- Reclassified: CG-18 on 30 June 1975
- Stricken: 1 October 1993
- Motto: ID FIAT WORDEN SI
- Fate: Sunk as target 17 June 2000 22° 57.1'N 160° 0.2'W
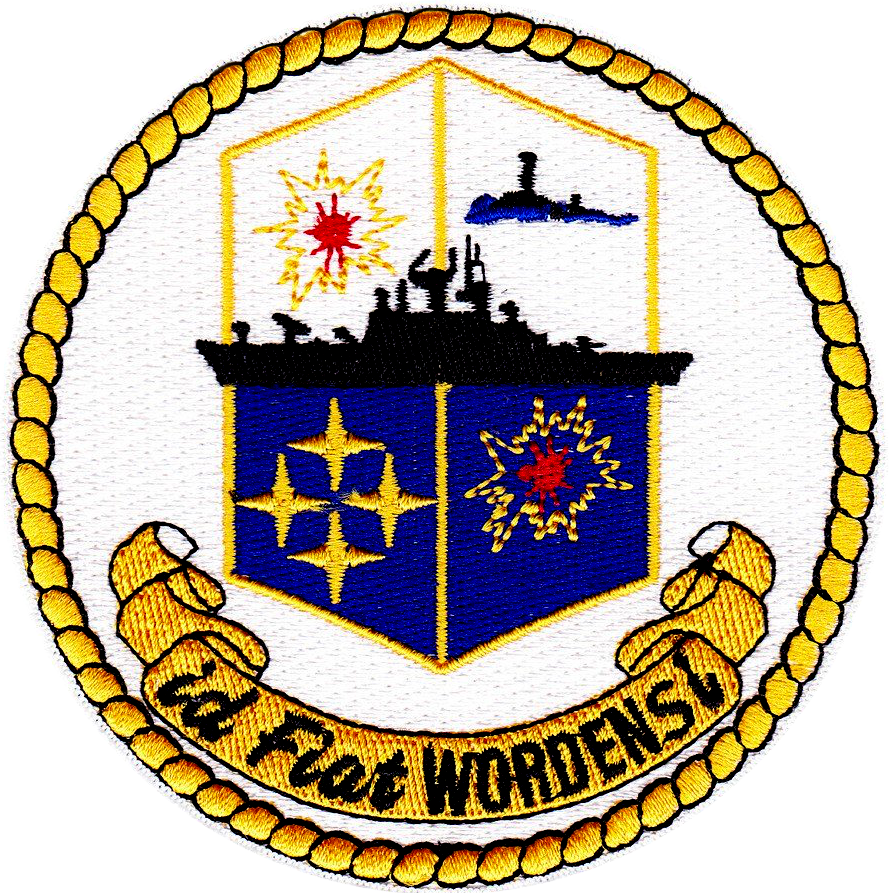
- Badge

General characteristics
- Class & type: Leahy-class cruiser
- Displacement: 7,903 tons
- Length: 533 ft (162 m)
- Beam: 53 ft (16 m)
- Draft: 24 ft 6 in (7.47 m)
- Speed: 34 kts
- Complement: 400 officers and enlisted
- Sensors & processing systems: AN/SPS-49 air search radar; AN/SPS-48 air search radar; AN/SPS-10 surface search radar; AN/SPG-55 fire control radar
- Electronic warfare & decoys: AN/SLQ-32; Mark 36 SRBOC
- Armament: 2 × Mark 10 RIM-2 Terrier SAM; 1 × ASROC ASW system; 4 × 3 in (76 mm)/50 caliber gun (replaced by Harpoon missiles during 1980s); 6 × 12.75 in (324 mm) Mark 32 Surface Vessel Torpedo Tubes; 2 × 20 mm Phalanx CIWS

The fourth USS Worden (DLG/CG-18), a Leahy-class cruiser, was a ship of the United States Navy named in honor of Admiral John L. Worden. Originally called a "destroyer leader" or frigate, in 1975 she was redesignated a cruiser in the Navy's ship reclassification. The ship entered service in 1963 and participated in the Vietnam War.

== Service history ==
Worden was laid down on 19 September 1961 by Bath Iron Works, Bath, Maine; launched on 2 June 1962; sponsored by Mrs. William R. Smedberg III; and commissioned at Boston, Massachusetts on 3 August 1963 under the command of Captain Scott Lothrop, USN.

Following her commissioning, Worden spent a two-month fitting-out period at the Boston Naval Shipyard. The guided missile frigate departed Boston on 12 October, bound for Bermuda for shakedown training. She then proceeded to Hampton Roads and sailed from Norfolk, Virginia on 28 October for her home port, San Diego, California, arriving there on 13 November. Following a trip to Dabob Bay and Seattle, Washington for sonar measurements, Worden became the flagship of her squadron.

In January 1964, Worden fired a series of missiles at the Pacific Missile Range for systems qualifications tests. She continued operations in the San Diego area until she entered the Long Beach Naval Shipyard in March for a post-shakedown availability which was completed in early May.

From 18 May to 26 June, the ship participated in underway training at San Diego. Worden's first fleet exercise took place from 10 to 17 July, a major anti-air warfare exercise. On 11 August 1964, the frigate sailed for the western Pacific for a Far East deployment. After refueling at Midway and Guam, the ship arrived in Subic Bay, Philippines, on 30 August and became an active participant in 7th Fleet activities. Worden visited Yokosuka, Japan, in late October and early November, then continued operations in Southeast Asia until the end of 1964.

On New Year's Day, 1965, Worden entered the port of Hong Kong for a period of rest and recreation. After a brief visit to Yokosuka, Japan, the frigate set course for the United States on 24 January. The ship arrived at her home port on 17 February and remained in port through 5 March when the ship commenced a three-month restricted availability at the Long Beach Naval Shipyard.

On 2 June 1965, Worden returned to San Diego for evaluation of a newly installed radar system. She continued to operate in her home port area and participated in Fleet Exercise "Range Bush" off the coast of southern California during the period 18 through 24 November 1965. She ended the year making preparations for deployment to the western Pacific.

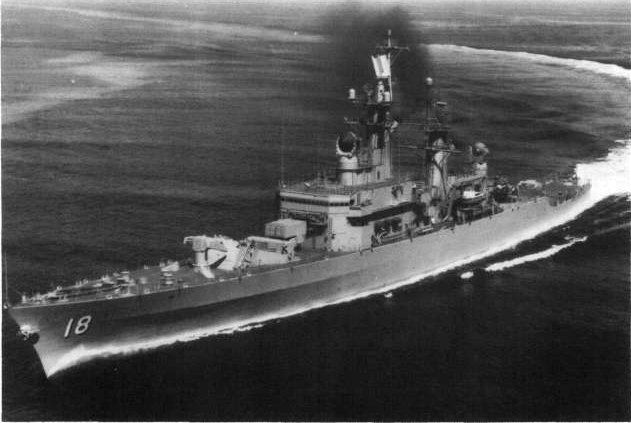
USS Worden, early in her career.

The frigate departed her home port on 7 January 1966 for Subic Bay, Philippines, via Pearl Harbor and Guam. She arrived at the Philippines on 30 January and, the following day, set course for the Gulf of Tonkin and operations with the 7th Fleet. On 4 February, Worden assumed "Tomcat" duties west of Hainan Island. After an eight-day visit to Sasebo, Japan, Worden departed on 1 March and returned to the Gulf of Tonkin to assume plane-guard duties for the aircraft carrier Ranger.

On 19 March, the frigate received a helicopter detachment on board; and, the following day, a rescue helicopter from Worden pulled a downed F-4 Phantom pilot from the water three miles from the beach. Another such rescue was effected on 23 May. Worden conducted operations in the Gulf of Tonkin until 17 June when she completed her commitment and proceeded to Yokosuka, Japan, for a short upkeep period prior to the return trip to California.

The frigate arrived at San Diego, on 10 July. During the period 11 September to 21 October, the ship fired a series of missiles at the Pacific Missile Range, as part of a missile test project. As of 31 December 1966, Worden was moored at Naval Station San Diego, preparing for future operations involving the project.

January 1967 was spent providing services for continued missile tests, and the frigate remained in port during February, training and preparing for an upcoming deployment. On 13 March, Worden took part in the second "Comtuex" of the year, then returned to San Diego.

Worden began a six-month deployment to the western Pacific on 8 April when she sailed for Japan via Pearl Harbor. On 26 April, the frigate arrived at Yokosuka, Japan. May began with Worden en route to Subic Bay via the Okinawa missile range. On 14 May, the ship reached Danang, South Vietnam, and served on a search and rescue station until mid-September with intermittent periods of upkeep and liberty at Subic Bay, Hong Kong, Sasebo, and Yokosuka. During a visit to Hong Kong on 13 August, a Greek freighter lost control and rammed Worden on the starboard side inflicting minor damage. As the frigate departed Hong Kong for Subic Bay, she sighted and rescued a dugout canoe with three Philippine nationals who had been adrift for three days.

On 14 September 1967, Worden departed the search and rescue station the last time for Yokosuka via Subic Bay. The ship departed Japan on 23 September for Pearl Harbor, thence to San Diego, arriving on 6 October. Worden remained in port until 16 November when she conducted local operations and type training. With the exception of a dependent's cruise and an off-load of ammunition at Seal Beach, Worden remained in port at San Diego for the month of December and thus ended the year.

The early days of 1968 found Worden at San Diego, completing plans and preparations for yard overhaul, her first since commissioning. On 9 January, the frigate sailed to the San Francisco Bay Naval Shipyard where she entered drydock. The major shipyard jobs were completed toward the middle of April. On 6 May, the ship began sea trials, and the overhaul was officially completed on 13 May 1968.

Upon returning to San Diego two days later, Worden conducted various exercises and evaluations in preparation for an upcoming western Pacific deployment. On 1 July, the frigate commenced six weeks of refresher training. The ship spent the month of September conducting missile firings and antisubmarine warfare exercises. During the period 1 to 10 October, Worden joined in Exercise "Beat Cadence", a simulation of the Tonkin Gulf task organization.

After a brief tender availability, Worden departed San Diego en route to Subic Bay, Philippines, via Pearl Harbor, arriving on 22 November. Three days later, the ship departed Subic Bay and became involved in a search and rescue (SAR) incident when a helicopter with nine Navy men on board ditched in the approach to the harbor. All of the men were rescued, and the helicopter was towed by boat to a nearby beach.

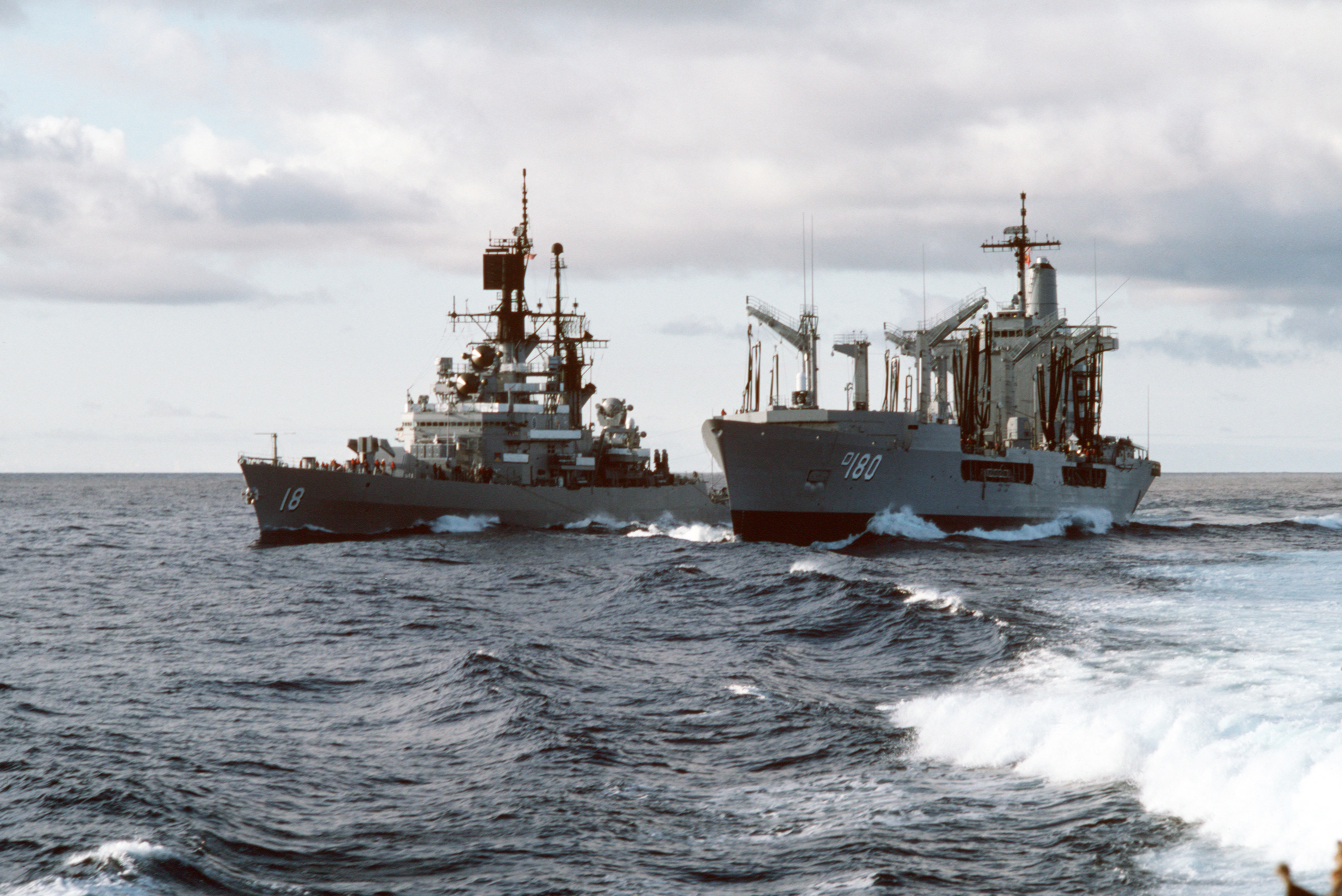
USS Worden underway replenishing with USS Willamette, 1986.

Worden then steamed to Danang, South Vietnam, for SAR briefings and anti-PT boat exercises before assuming duties as commander of the task unit at the northern SAR station. The frigate shifted to the southern SAR station on 5 December and remained on station without incident until 29 December when USS Coontz relieved the ship. Worden then proceeded to Kaohsiung, Taiwan, for an overnight logistics stop en route to Sasebo, Japan, for repairs.

The New Year, 1969, found Worden en route to Sasebo, Japan. After stopping at Keelung, Taiwan; and Subic Bay, Philippines; the ship returned to the northern SAR station, Danang, South Vietnam, on 25 January 1969. She remained on station through 18 February when she departed for Subic Bay; then to Singapore and Hong Kong. The frigate returned to her station on 14 March for a week of service before departing the last time for Subic Bay, arriving on 23 March. For the remainder of the month, she conducted task group operations.

Worden returned to Subic Bay on 4 April, then began a cruise which took her to Sydney (14 to 21 April); Wellington, New Zealand (25 to 27 April); and Pago Pago, American Samoa (1 May). The ship arrived at San Diego, on 8 June and conducted a Secretary of the Navy guest cruise and a material inspection through 30 June.

The frigate conducted local operations throughout July and August. On 22 September, she set sail for Acapulco, then transited the Panama Canal. Worden's ultimate destination was Bath, Maine, where, on 10 November 1969, she was decommissioned at Bath Iron Works.

=== 1970–1979 ===
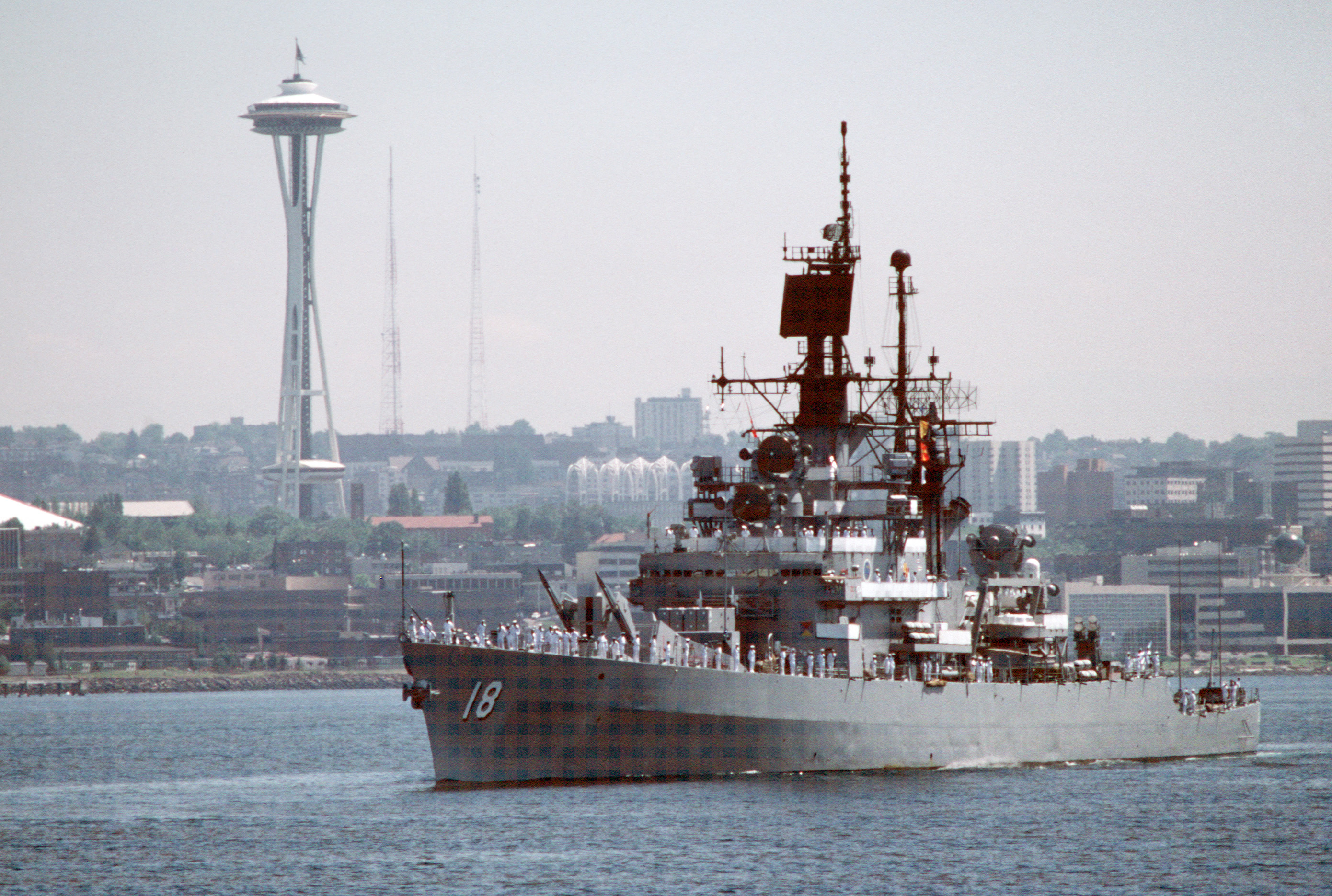
USS Worden and the Seattle skyline, 1986.

The lengthy yard period which followed was the product of a Navy-wide program to enhance the anti-air warfare capability of all guided missile frigates which included the installation of the Naval Tactical Data System (NTDS) and two Terrier missile directors, (AN/SPG-55).

Worden was recommissioned at the Bath Iron Works 18 months later on 16 January 1971. On 6 February, the ship departed for the transit to her new home port of Long Beach, California. After a period of refresher training at Guantanamo Bay, Cuba, and liberty at Acapulco, Worden arrived at Long Beach on 19 March 1971. During the next two months, the ship underwent an intensive training period off the southern California coast in connection with the modernization program.

On 7 July 1971, the frigate entered the Long Beach Naval Shipyard for an eight-week period of post-shakedown availability. The ship began preparations for her fourth overseas deployment beginning on 7 September following her departure from the shipyard. In late August, Worden crew members learned the ship was to be permanently assigned to the 7th Fleet with a home port change to Yokosuka, Japan. This major policy decision was designed to alleviate the burden of long family separations.

Worden got underway on 20 October 1971 for her new home port. She stopped briefly at Pearl Harbor before arriving at Yokosuka on 11 November. During the last six weeks of the year, Worden conducted special operations in the Sea of Japan and enjoyed a month-long holiday rest.

The frigate sailed from Yokosuka on 3 January 1972 for special operations in the Sea of Japan. Returning to Yokosuka on 17 January, the ship prepared for the first cruise in three years to the Gulf of Tonkin. These preparations took her to Buckner Bay, Okinawa, and Subic Bay, Philippines.

On 6 February, Worden left the Philippines and proceeded west to assume duties in the Gulf of Tonkin. The frigate operated on the northern SAR station, then moved closer to the North Vietnamese coast off Thanh Hoa until 11 March when she proceeded back to her home port, Yokosuka, Japan. After a month of operations off Japan and Okinawa in connection with amphibious Exercise "Golden Dragon", Worden moved south to help counter a North Vietnamese major offensive. She assumed duties as an escort for the carrier Coral Sea.

The first major air strike on Haiphong since 1968 took place on 15 April. During the strike, Worden was damaged by two AGM-45 Shrike anti-radiation missiles inadvertently fired by United States support aircraft. One crew member was killed, and nine others were seriously injured; they were airlifted by helicopter to the amphibious assault ship Tripoli for treatment. Worden proceeded to Subic Bay for a 10-day repair period. The frigate returned to the Gulf of Tonkin until 11 May and operated as an escort for the aircraft carrier Kitty Hawk. She took a break from 8 to 11 May and assumed a search and rescue station off Thanh Hoa during the first mine-laying strikes on North Vietnam.

On 16 May 1972, Worden began a restricted availability at Yokosuka, Japan, followed by missile tests at Okinawa. On 20 June, she returned to duties at the southern SAR station, operating off Cape Mui Ron for the next month. After a brief visit to Yokosuka, Worden returned to the Gulf of Tonkin on 9 August and served as escort for the carriers Midway and Kitty Hawk.

Worden moved to the middle search and rescue station off Vinh on 1 October, then to the southern station shortly after. On 17 October, Worden departed for Hachinohe, Japan, and Navy Day festivities. The ship went into drydock at Yokosuka on 25 October for replacement of both propellers. Worden again returned to the Gulf of Tonkin on 18 November where she operated until 5 December. After a visit to Taiwan, the frigate finished out the year at Yokosuka, Japan, in a standdown period.

Operations in the Gulf of Tonkin and in-port periods characterized Worden's employments during 1973. Support of Task Force (TF) 77 and TF 78 was interspersed with needed repair availabilities in Yokosuka, Japan, and Subic Bay, Philippines, and relaxing port visits to Hong Kong and Taiwan.

On 28 January 1973, the Vietnam cease fire was announced, and Worden joined TF 78 at Subic Bay. During the sweeping of Haiphong harbor, she functioned as Rear Admiral Brian McCauley's flagship as well as the helicopter support platform, the repair and logistic facility for the minesweeping units, and task force antiair warfare and surface defense. For later operations, the frigate served on antiair picket station and as the Positive Identification and Radar Advisory Zone (PIRAZ) station. Besides the inherent responsibility for aircraft control and identification and air surveillance, Worden functioned as search and rescue asset coordinator and platform for the pre-positioned helicopter.

After the combat and post-hostility period had ended, Worden began stressing new phases of operations: antisubmarine warfare and engineering readiness. The last underway period of the year, 30 November to 3 December, was spent conducting ship antisubmarine tactics with the destroyer Bausell and the submarine Darter. Worden returned to Yokosuka to a Christmas holiday upkeep period and a rest from the activities of the past year.

Worden's first exercise of the new year 1974 was "Aswex 3–74" (Taeknando III) with the Republic of Korea Navy, conducted from 14 to 17 January. After a brief return to Yokosuka, she participated in joint Exercise "Fly-A-Way" off Okinawa, returning to her home port on 8 February.

The warship remained in Yokosuka until 25 February in upkeep status, then sailed for Subic Bay, Philippines, for surface missile exercises. The missile exercises marked the first multi-ship missile exercise in the western Pacific of the post-Vietnam era. Worden followed these exercises with a port visit to Keelung, Taiwan, and tender availability at Sasebo, Japan. On 29 March, the frigate departed Sasebo for operations with Midway in the Sea of Japan. She also joined the destroyer Parsons in a search and rescue exercise simulating a North Korean surface unit. Worden returned to Yokosuka on 7 April to begin a lengthy upkeep period in preparation for her representation of the United States at the Shimoda Black Ship Festival on 15 May. On 10 May 1974, a major earthquake occurred on the Izu Peninsula causing extensive damage to the Shimoda area. As a result, the Black Ship Festival was cancelled, and Worden continued upkeep with a brief underway period for type training.

The ship got underway on 25 May and joined Midway and the task group to conduct air operations in the Yokosuka and northern Japan operations areas. While underway, Worden joined the Japanese Maritime Self Defense Force in joint Exercise "Aswex 5–74." On 4 June, Worden was detached from Midway and proceeded independently to the Okinawa missile range to conduct missile firing tests followed by a port visit to Keelung, Taiwan. While in port, eight first class NROTC midshipmen embarked in Worden to participate in the six-week "Westpactramid 1–74."

On 27 June, Worden returned to Yokosuka to begin a short upkeep period to prepare for the American-Japanese midshipmen exchange cruise. The frigate sailed from Yokosuka on 17 July in company with Midway and the task group for air operations off northern Japan. After a brief stop in Yokosuka, Worden departed on 22 July for Kure, Japan, to participate in the midshipmen exchange cruise. The final phase of the cruise took place in port at Yokosuka on 30 and 31 July and included spirits and social events. Worden remained in Yokosuka until 2 August, when she sailed for task group operations along the northern coast of Japan. On 15 August, she began a period in port at Yokosuka and, in late August, sailed for the eastern Pacific, nearer the United States than she had been since deploying to the Pacific in October 1971. During this period, Worden remained in the company of a Soviet Kanin-class destroyer and Kynda II-class cruiser.

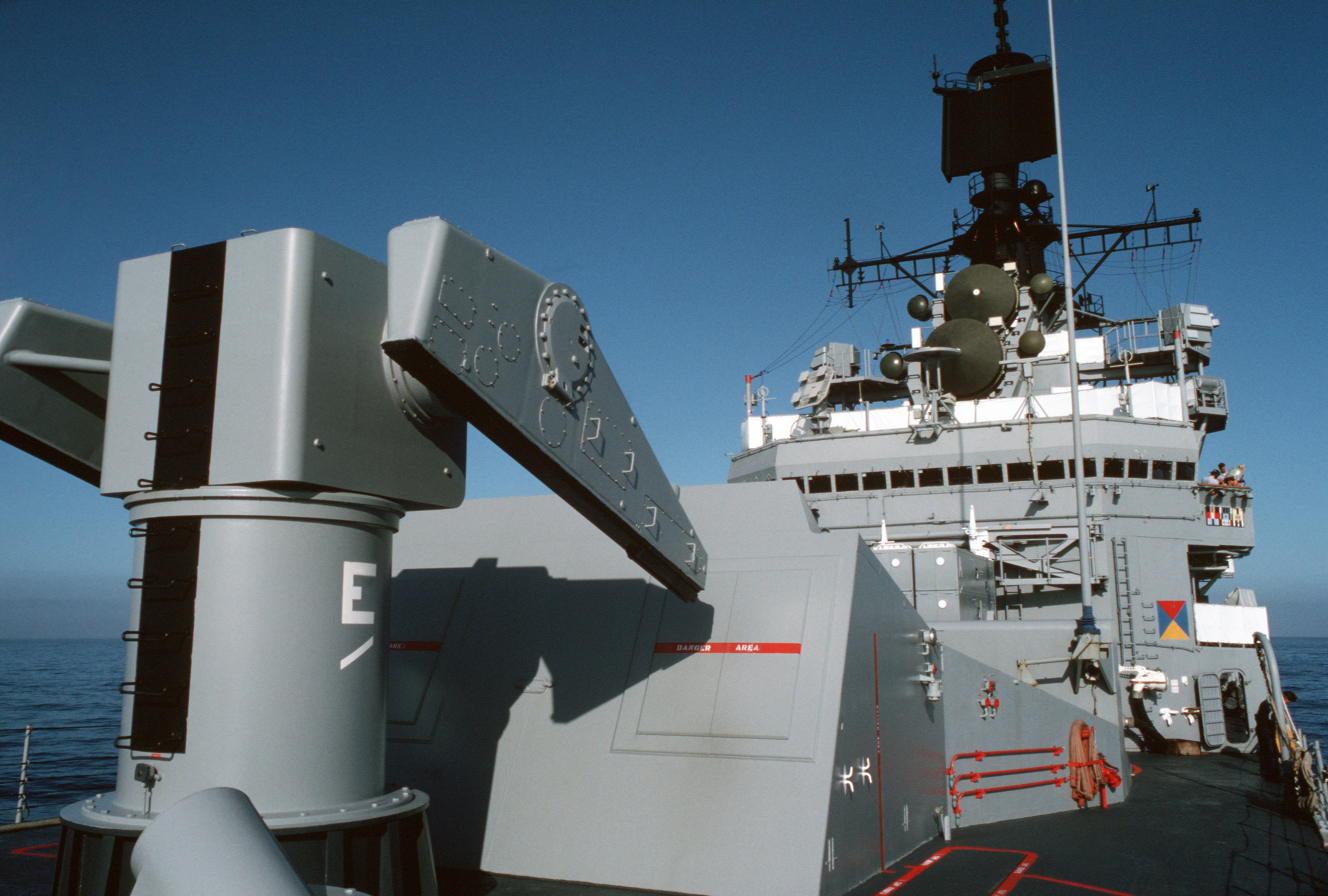
USS Worden Mark 10 missile launcher and missile house for Terrier or RIM-67 Standard missiles.

Worden departed the area on 4 September for Hong Kong, thence to Yokosuka, Japan. Upon arrival on 25 September, Worden underwent upkeep, then sailed to Sasebo to embark Japanese officers for training. Worden made rendezvous with Midway and conducted an operational readiness inspection en route to Yokosuka. Arriving in port on 11 October, the ship began an upkeep period and was drydocked on the 25th. Three days of underway training late in November signaled the approaching end of the upkeep period. Following a Thanksgiving celebration, the ship got underway for Manila, Philippines, arriving there on 4 December. Four days later, she joined Midway and steamed for northern Japan, conducting Operation "Command Diamond", a major Air Force and Navy exercise off Okinawa on 16 December. Worden arrived in Yokosuka on 19 December and entered a holiday period which closed the year 1974.

The frigate departed the naval ship repair facility at Yokosuka on 13 January 1975 en route to Subic Bay, Philippines. During this two-week at-sea period, she conducted antiaircraft and antisubmarine warfare operations with Midway. The ship arrived on 27 January for a week at Subic Bav and participated in Operation "Readex" before returning to Yokosuka on 19 February. Upon arrival, she commenced a 20-day availability period; and, on 11 March, she got underway for 10 days of routine flight operations off Okinawa. She then returned to Yokosuka where she commenced upkeep and preparation for an upcoming cruise. On 25 March, Worden got underway for Pusan, Korea, for a port visit, thence to Subic Bay for operations. After completing operations, Worden headed for Thailand and a much awaited port visit.

The frigate, as part of the 7th Fleet, assisted in the evacuation of Americans from Vietnam as part of Operation "Frequent Wind." As the operation came to a close on 3 May, Worden returned to Thailand to resume her port visit. However, the capture of the SS Mayaquez by the Cambodians on 13 May interrupted her stay; and she sailed for Hong Kong. Mayaquez was freed before Worden reached the British crown colony, so the frigate proceeded to Yokosuka, arriving there on 20 May.

After various inspections, Worden operated with Midway for 11 days in mid-June; followed by a dependents' cruise. By directive from the Secretary of the Navy, dated 30 June 1975, Worden's designator was changed from a guided missile frigate (DLG) to a guided missile cruiser (CG). Following an at-sea period from 8 to 21 July with Midway, Worden conducted a midshipmen cruise with the Japanese Maritime Self Defense Force. August saw operations in ocean areas between Japan and Okinawa with Midway in preparation for "Midlink-75", a CENTO exercise in the Indian Ocean. Worden and Midway arrived in Yokosuka on 22 August for a lengthy upkeep period.

On 4 October 1975, the cruiser got underway for "Midlink-75", the first stop being Subic Bay, Philippines. En route, she participated in Exercise "Cape Diamond." Departing Subic Bay on 14 October, she joined Exercise "Merlion" with the Royal Singapore Navy and Air Force off the coast of Malaysia. On 30 October, she arrived at Colombo, Sri Lanka. On 3 November, the cruiser got underway for Bandar Abbas, Iran, conducting naval maneuvers and training exercises en route. On 11 and 12 November, elements of the Pakistan Navy joined Worden and conducted training before she arrived at Bandar Abbas. After a week in Iran attending conferences and meetings to plan the at-sea operations, the cruiser departed on 19 November to Exercise "Midlink-75." Ten days later, Worden departed for her home port of Yokosuka, Japan, via Subic Bay, Philippines. During her brief stay at Subic Bay, the cruiser enjoyed a visit by the Honorable J. William Middendorf II, Secretary of the Navy. The ship entered Yokosuka harbor on 19 December and celebrated the holiday season at her home port.

Worden entered the bicentennial year moored at the Yokosuka Naval Base, Yokosuka, Japan. On 3 January 1976, the cruiser sailed from Yokosuka, making port visits to Hong Kong; Okinawa; Pusan, Korea; and Sasebo, Japan; with exercises and task group operations held en route. The ship returned to her home port on 2 February and began a pre-overhaul restricted availability. Worden went into drydock from 20 February until 22 June, and the regular overhaul came to a close on 6 December. On 13 December, Worden went to sea for five days of independent steaming exercises; then the cruiser returned to Yokosuka on 17 December and spent the holiday season in port.

In 1976 over 2/3 of the ship's company were either given Non Judicial Punishment or Courts Martials based upon questionable statements given to the Naval Investigative Service after a Seaman was faced with a drug possession charge.

During the first six months of 1977, Worden conducted comprehensive post-overhaul training and inspections in the areas of Yokosuka, Japan; and Subic Bay, Philippines. Operations commenced on 18 June at Subic Bay with "Multiplex" exercises. After a port visit to Singapore, Worden arrived at Yokosuka on 14 July and remained in port through 23 July when she set sail for Subic Bay. The cruiser conducted underway replenishment drills and "Missilex" exercises before arriving in Hong Kong on the morning of 13 August.

On 2 September, Worden returned to her home port of Yokosuka and began preparing for an upcoming deployment. This deployment commenced on 27 September when Worden sailed for Subic Bay, thence to Victoria Quay, Fremantle, Australia, for a month-long visit. The ship then visited Bandar Abbas, Iran, from 9 to 21 November and Singapore from 5 to 11 December. Worden arrived at Yokosuka, Japan, on 21 December and enjoyed a period of leave and liberty for the holiday season.

From 14 to 21 January 1978, Worden cruised to Chinhae, South Korea. After briefly returning to Yokosuka on 25 January, the cruiser left again for operations with Midway and the task group. On 13 February, Worden and Midway rendezvoused with TF 77 and conducted "Readex 78", maneuvering to avoid detection by "enemy" ships and land-based aircraft from Okinawa while positioning for a simulated assault on the island of Okinawa. On 19 February, Worden got underway for Yokosuka, via Chinhae, South Korea. She arrived there on 27 February and began an in-port period.

Worden's in-port period was marked by several inspections, an open house, plus visits from staff members of the 7th Fleet and officers of the Japanese Maritime Self Defense Force. On 23 March, the ship departed for Chinhae and conducted antisubmarine warfare training en route. Once anchored, she completed the final phase of a Navy technical proficiency inspection. She returned to her home port on 28 March and conducted operations with Midway from 11 to 23 April. Preparations for a material inspection continued throughout April and May. Worden spent May in an upkeep period in Yokosuka with support from the destroyer tender Prairie and the Yokosuka repair facility.

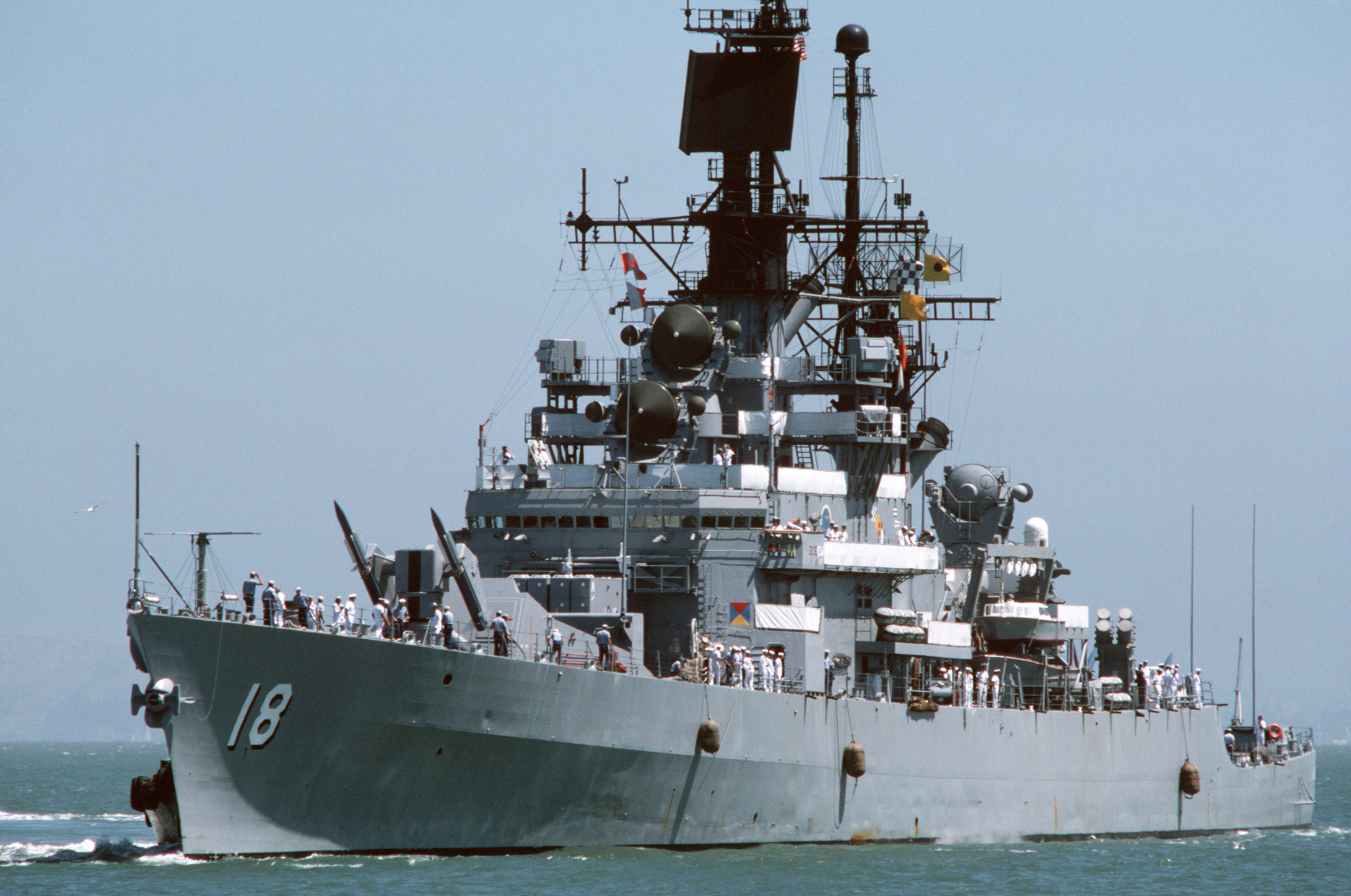
USS Worden, 1986.

On 30 May, the cruiser departed for Keelung, Taiwan, her first liberty port in 1978. Worden returned to Yokosuka on 9 June for a brief four-day visit before joining carrier task group activities in the northern Philippine Sea. She returned to Yokosuka, Japan, on 28 June for an in-port period which ended on 19 July with a three-week transit to Subic Bay with the Midway task group. Having detached from task group operations and traveled to Buckner Bay, Okinawa, Worden commenced "Missilex 4–78" on the morning of 1 August. Due to three successive unsuccessful launch attempts by the Japanese antiaircraft training ship Azuma, the exercise was canceled, and Worden headed back to Subic Bay, Philippines, and a week of upkeep.

After successfully completing a missile shoot on 12 August, the cruiser returned to Yokosuka briefly before taking part in task group operations on 22 August. On 1 September, she paid Chinhae, Korea, a port visit, then returned to her home port one week later. From 19 September to 2 October, Worden operated with Midway, after which time she conducted a two-day, combined antisubmarine warfare exercise with elements of the Republic of Korea Navy. The cruiser continued operations with Midway, then returned to Yokosuka for an in-port period.

On 6 November 1978, Worden got underway from Yokosuka for underway tests and evaluations. She took part in "Maulex 1–79", an amphibious exercise involving units of the United States and Republic of Korea Navies, then celebrated Thanksgiving at Hong Kong. On 3 December, the ship entered Subic Bay, Philippines, for various tests and then made rendezvous with Midway and returned to Yokosuka, Japan, on 22 December for the duration of the holiday season.

Worden spent the year 1979 operating out of Yokosuka, Japan.

=== 1980 ===
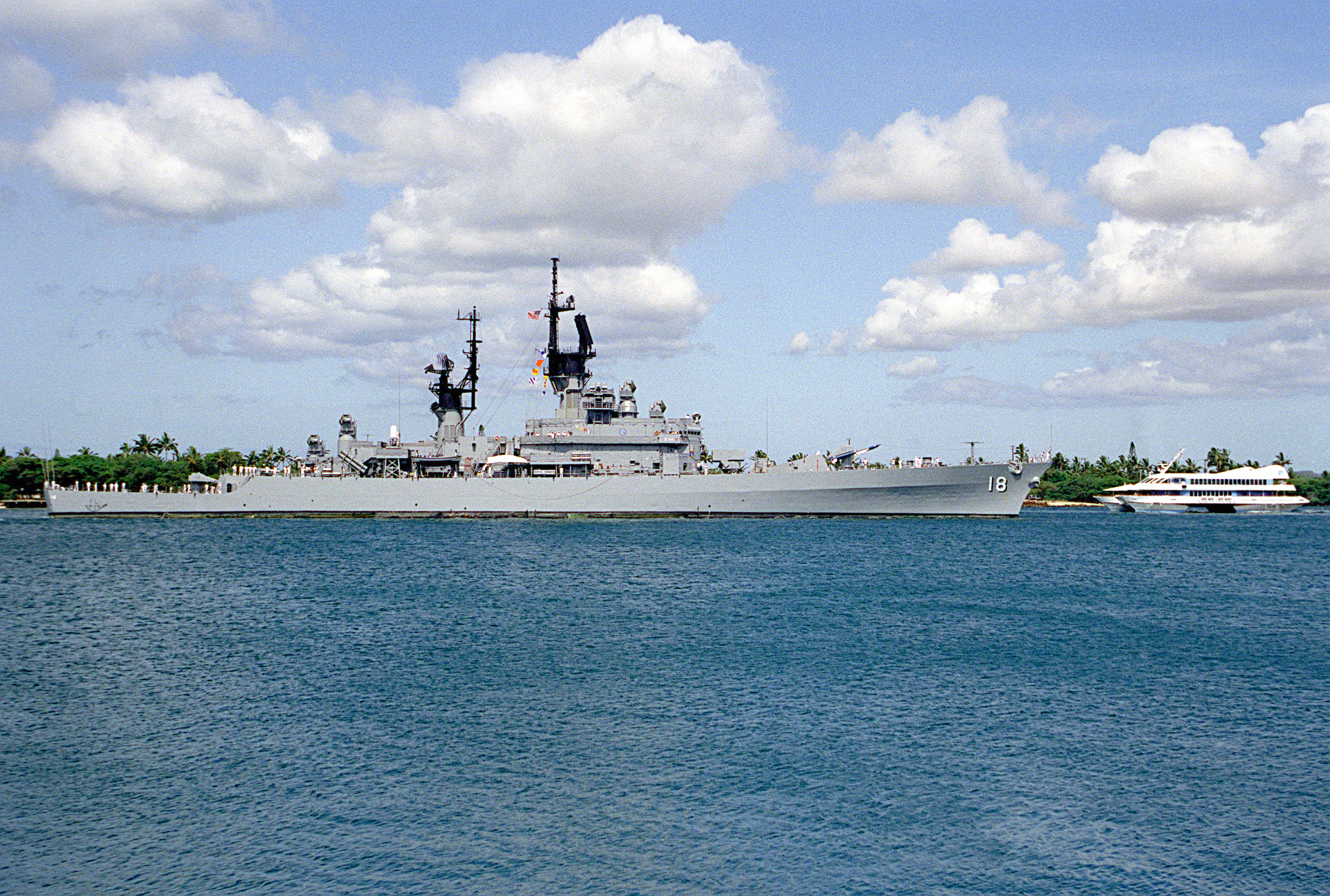
USS Worden returning to Pearl Harbor, 1991.

On 21 January, under the command of Captain Carl Alfred Nelson USN, USS Worden deployed from Japan, arriving first at Subic Bay before conducting workup exercises in the South China Sea then returning to Subic Bay on 5 February 1980, during which a meeting occurred with the crew of the USS Reeves (CG-24); the USS Reeves was to replace USS Worden in Japan, and the meeting was the beginning of planning for the turnover in Japan later that year.

On departing Subic Bay USS Worden headed for Thailand, but during the transit on 10 February 1980 she came across a fishing boat in distress; on board were 33 Vietnamese refugees, who were brought aboard USS Worden, after which the fishing boat was destroyed by USS Worden, which continued to Thailand to drop off the refugees, then continue her deployment. After several days at Pattaya Beach, Thailand, which the crew enjoyed, USS Worden headed back to Subic Bay, arriving on 20 February 1980, before returning home to Yokosuka in early March. USS Worden sailed with the Midway Battle Group in mid March to Sasebo, Japan, then back to Yokosuka on 23 March, where the crew prepared for their Indian Ocean deployment.

On 10 April 1980, USS Worden departed Yokosuka, first heading for Subic Bay, then joining up with the Constellation Battle Group on 20 April 1980 as they arrived off Singapore. Again USS Worden assisted another boat of Vietnamese refugees, forcing the ship to head to Singapore to offload the refugees before rejoining the battle group. On 30 April 1980 USS Worden and the Constellation Battle Group arrived in the Gulf of Oman, otherwise known as Gonzo Station. May saw USS Worden operate with both Constellation and Eisenhower Battle Groups as Air Defence Commander before USS Worden left Gonzo Station on 6 June for a port visit to Mombasa, Kenya. During the trip to Kenya, USS Worden conducted the traditional 'Wog Day' ceremony on 10 June 1980, with 230 crewmembers, including the ship's executive officer, Commander Arthur Newlon USN, crossing the equator for the first time, becoming Shellbacks in the eyes of King Neptune and Davy Jones. USS Worden arrived at Mombasa on 12 June 1980 after 55 days at sea.

After a relaxing six days in Kenya, USS Worden returned to the Gulf of Oman, resuming her role as Air Defence Commander on 22 June 1980, the cruiser continued to operate with the Eisenhower and Constellation Battle Groups before she again departed Gonzo Station on 6 July 1980, this time for good, steaming south east and arriving in Perth/Fremantle, Western Australia, at A Shed, Victoria Quay, Fremantle Harbour on 16 July 1980.

Unlike her last visit in 1977, this time the USS Worden's crew had the cities of Perth and Fremantle all to themselves. To quote from the Ship's Command History, "The hospitality and friendly reception was overwhelming. The "Dial a Sailor" lines were flooded with calls, the Chief Petty Officers were treated to a party at the naval base (HMAS Leeuwin) nearby. Fremantle put a big spread on for the crew, and the Wardroom (Officers) was treated to a cocktail party by the Australian-American Association of Fremantle at the Town Hall. Perth isn't far off and many WORDEN sailors found liberty there exciting." USS Worden was open to the public, and over 4000 visitors toured the ship.

But during the visit the USS Worden lost a crewmember, with Fire Control Technician (Missile Fire Control) First Class (FTM1) Moss USN, who fell into Fremantle Harbour during the visit and drowned.

USS Worden departed Fremantle on 21 July 1980 and headed home to Japan, with a stop in Subic Bay, arriving at Yokosuka on 3 August 1980, ending her 1980 Indian Ocean deployment of 114 days. But there was no rest for USS Worden and her crew, as the crew and homeport changeover with USS Reeves drew closer with USS Reeves arriving on 14 August, and the crew transfer taking place on 19 August 1980, with 104 Worden crewmen transferring to USS Reeves and remaining in Japan, and 119 Reeves crew moving on board USS Worden for the trip to USS Worden's new homeport of Pearl Harbor, Hawaii, which began when USS Worden departed Yokosuka for the final time as a homeport ship on 25 August 1980. For this cruise many of the crewmembers family sailed on board to Hawaii, the first 'Tiger' cruise USS Worden had undertaken in many years.

During the transit across the Pacific Ocean, the funeral service for Fire Control Technician (Missile Fire Control) First Class (FTM1) Moss USN, took place on 29 August 1980. Remembered as a 'Fine Shipmate' FTM1 Moss's Ashes were spread out to the ocean, forever remaining 'On Eternal Patrol'

Upon arrival at Pearl Harbor on 3 September 1980, USS Worden displayed a 192 Foot Homeward Bound Pennant. Each foot of the pennant represented a Worden Crewmember that had been on board USS Worden for over ten months. During this time, USS Worden would being a new stage of her career, entering a drydock for upgrades to her systems, including the addition of the BGM-84 Harpoon missile.

=== 1990-1993 ===
Worden actively participated in the naval and air campaign in the first Gulf War. Soon after Iraq invaded Kuwait on 2 August 1990, Worden was tasked to deploy to the Middle East in support of Operation Desert Shield. Worden's combat capabilities had recently been updated with the New Threat Upgrade, a massive remodeling of the ship, from food service space rehabilitation to a main propulsion system overhaul and weapon system upgrades.

Worden set sail for the Persian Gulf and upon arrival took over duties as anti air warfare commander in the northern Persian Gulf. Worden air intercept controllers directed coalition aircraft in combat air patrols in the northernmost parts of the gulf before hostilities began. Worden continued in this capacity when Desert Shield transitioned to Desert Storm until general hostilities ceased.

Later that year Worden went on to participate in joint Navy/Coast Guard Law Enforcement operations off of the coast of Mexico with an embarked Coast Guard Law Enforcement Detachment, resulting in a large seizure of cocaine from the civilian vessel Swiftsure on 3 November 1991 and the capture of two suspected smugglers. At the time it the largest maritime Cocaine seizure in history. Worden was awarded the Coast Guard Special Operations Ribbon.

In late 1992 Worden returned to the Persian Gulf in support of Operation Southern Watch. Worden was assigned to the Kitty Hawk battle group and supported the actions that took place throughout January 1993 against Iraqi ground targets. Worden earned its 3rd Southwest Asia service medal and the Meritorious Unit Commendation for this deployment.

Worden returned to Pearl Harbor and began the decommissioning process in early 1993.

== Decommissioning ==
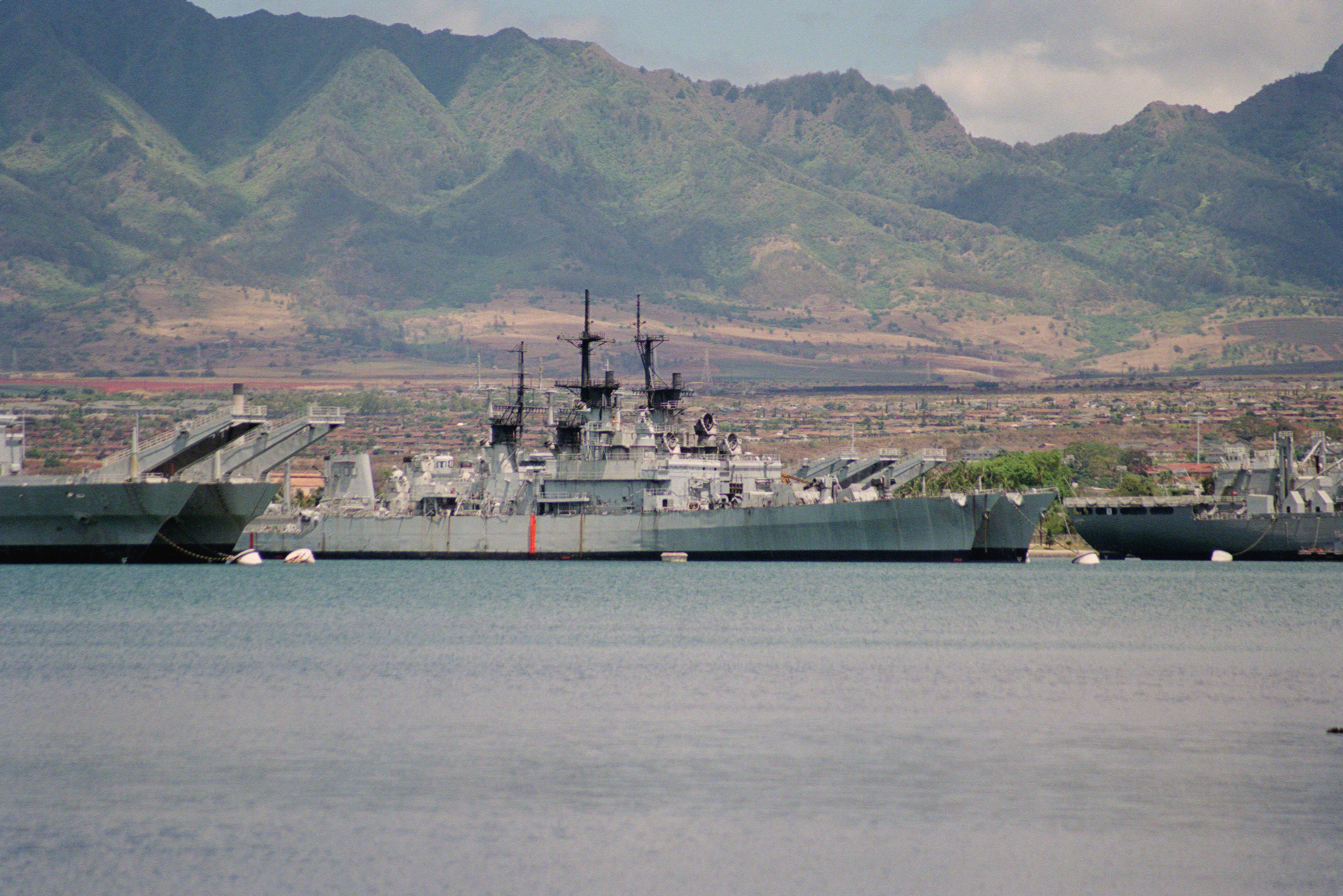
ex-Worden on 4 June 2000 just days prior to its SINKEX.

Worden decommissioned and was struck from the Naval Register at Pearl Harbor on 1 October 1993. Worden was towed to the inactive ships area of Pearl Harbor and put under the care of the MARAD program which continued basic maintenance and kept the ship in inactive ready reserve status for the rest of the 90's. Although originally intended for a scrap sale, that contract was rescinded and after the proper preparation, the former Worden was sunk as a target during RIMPAC on 17 June 2000. Worden rests at a depth of 2,560 fathoms at 22°57.1′N 160°0.2′W.

== Honors and awards ==
Worden earned nine battle stars for her Vietnam service, the Combat Action Ribbon, Navy Unit Commendation and Southwest Asia Service Medal for service in Desert Storm, and the Meritorious Unit Commendation for her service in Operation Southern Watch, among other lesser awards.
