= USS Leonard F. Mason =

Gearing-class destroyer (1946–1976)

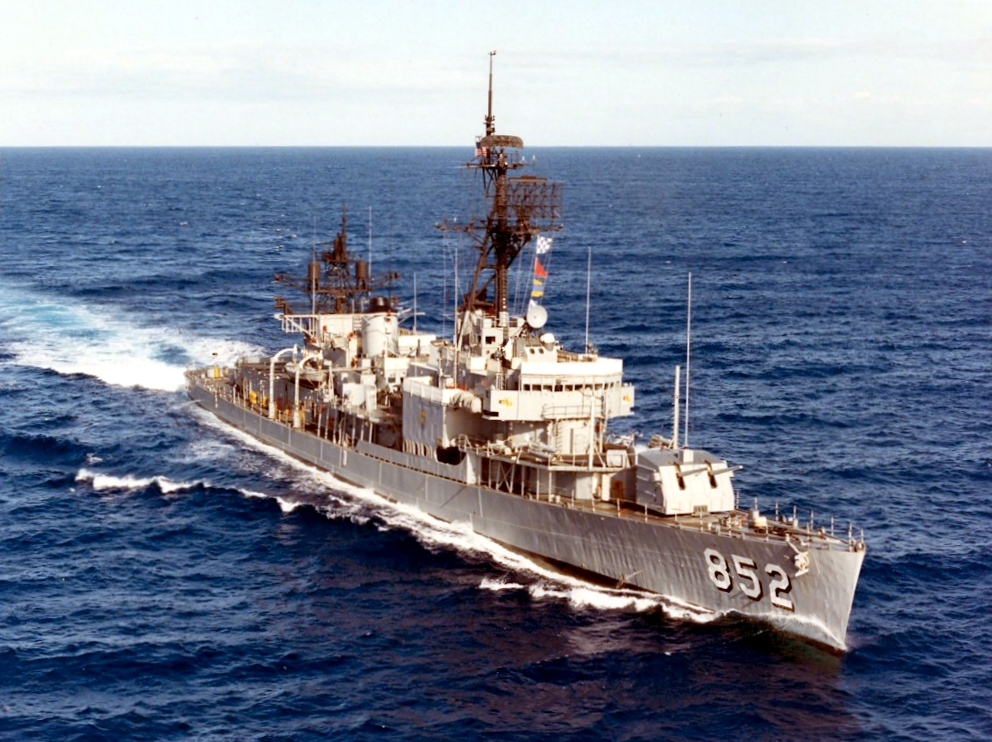
- USS Leonard F. Mason underway in May 1974

History

United States
- Name: Leonard F. Mason
- Namesake: Leonard Foster Mason
- Builder: Bethlehem Shipbuilding Corporation
- Laid down: 6 August 1945
- Launched: 4 January 1946
- Sponsored by: Mrs. Hillery Mason
- Commissioned: 28 June 1946
- Decommissioned: 2 November 1976
- Stricken: 2 November 1976
- Identification: Callsign: NBDM; Hull number: DD-852
- Honors and awards: See Awards
- Fate: Sold to Taiwan, 10 March 1978

Taiwan
- Name: Lai Yang; (綏陽)
- Namesake: Lai Yang
- Acquired: 10 March 1978
- Commissioned: 25 May 1978
- Reclassified: DDG-926
- Decommissioned: 16 February 2000
- Out of service: Hull number: DD-926
- Fate: Sunk as artificial reef, 11 April 2003

General characteristics
- Class & type: Gearing-class destroyer
- Displacement: 2,425 long tons (2,464 t)
- Length: 390 ft 6 in (119.02 m)
- Beam: 41 ft 1 in (12.52 m)
- Draft: 18 ft (5.5 m)
- Propulsion: Geared turbines, 2 shafts, 65,464 shp (49 MW)
- Speed: 35 knots (65 km/h; 40 mph)
- Range: 4,500 nmi (8,300 km) at 20 kn (37 km/h; 23 mph)
- Complement: 11 officers, 325 crew
- Armament: As built : 6 × 5"/38 caliber guns; 12 × 40 mm AA guns; 11 × 20 mm AA guns; 10 × 21 inch (533 mm) torpedo tubes; 6 × depth charge projectors; 2 × depth charge tracks; From 1973 : 2 × twin 5"/38 caliber guns; Torpedo launchers; ASROC; CHAFFROC; Chaparral SAM; 50-calibre machine guns

USS Leonard F. Mason (DD-852) was a Gearing-class destroyer in the United States Navy. She was named for Private First Class Leonard F. Mason USMC (1920–1944), who was posthumously awarded the Medal of Honor for his heroism during the Battle of Guam.

== Construction and career ==
Leonard F. Mason was laid down on 6 August 1945 by Bethlehem Shipbuilding Corporation's Fore River Shipyard, Quincy, Massachusetts launched on 4 January 1946; sponsored by Mrs. Mollie (Partin) Mason, Mother of PFC Mason; and commissioned on 28 June 1946.

=== Service in the United States Navy ===
Following shakedown in the Caribbean, DD-852 joined Destroyer Division 32 (DesDiv 32) in the Pacific on 22 January 1947. From 1947 to 1950, the ship completed two cruises in the western Pacific, as well as stateside operations.

==== Korean War ====
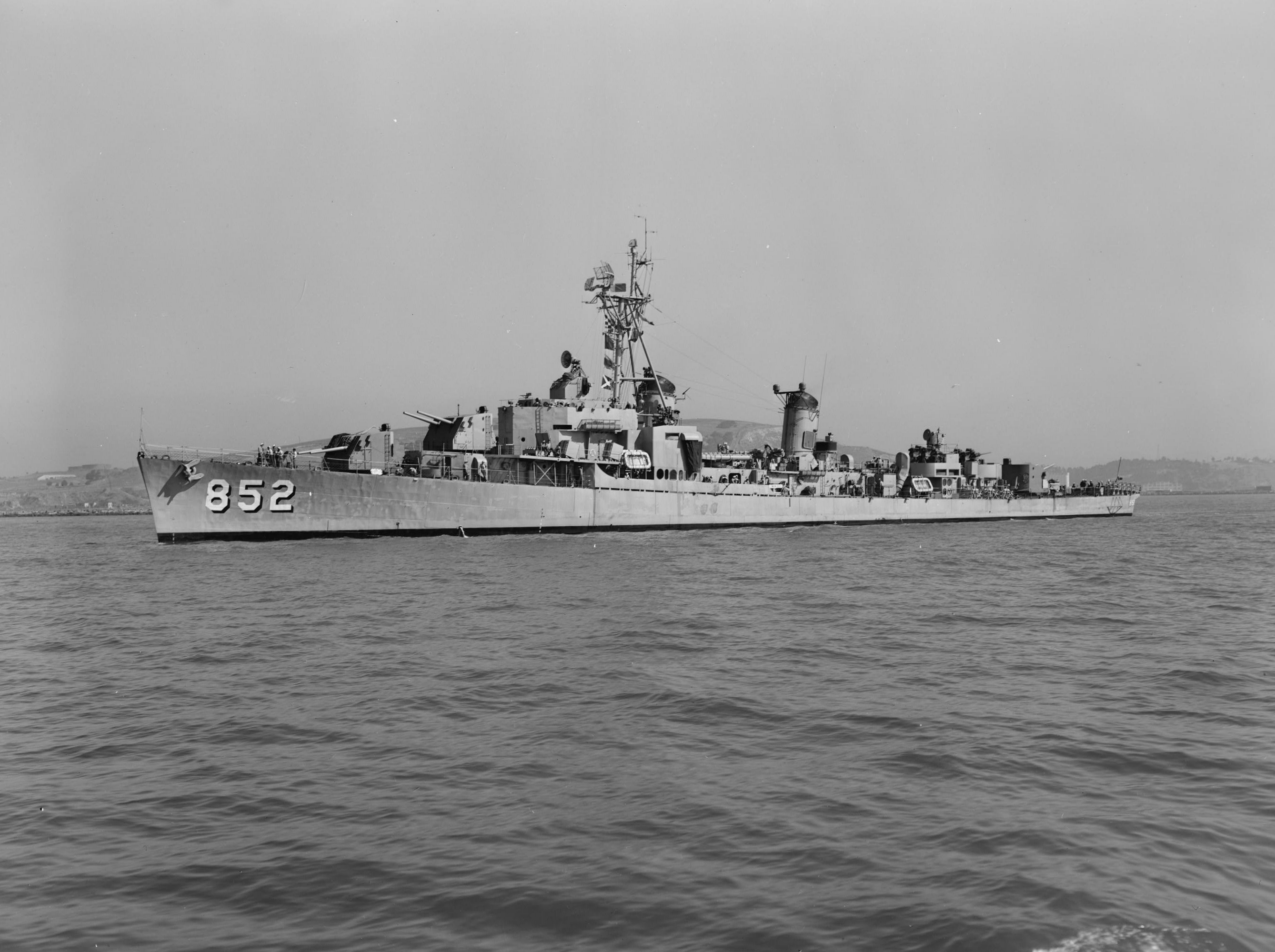
Leonard F. Mason underway on 26 September 1950

During the early stages of the Korean War, Leonard F. Mason steamed for the Pacific on 13 November 1950 and joined in anti-submarine exercises.

On 16 May 1951 she joined Task Force 85 (TF 85) at the siege of Wonsan to fire in the continuous shore bombardment which inflicted heavy damage on enemy bridges, tunnels, and troop concentrations. Bombardment was intense, and performed in cycles of 2, 3 and 5 minutes. While anchored in Wonsan, the North Koreans attempted to board the ship through the anchor chain, but were unsuccessful. Departing Wonsan on 23 July, she steamed for San Diego, California arriving 8 August 1951.

After overhaul, the ship sailed on 23 February 1952 for the Orient, and again operated in Wonsan Harbor and along the eastern coast of Korea. Departing Yokosuka on 13 September, she arrived Long Beach on 27 September and remained there until 16 May 1953 when she again steamed for the Far East. Arriving in Korean waters on 9 June, Mason joined Task Group 70.1 (TG 70.1) for escort and bombardment action with the battleship New Jersey (BB-62) off Wonsan and in the Yellow Sea.

==== Suez Crisis ====
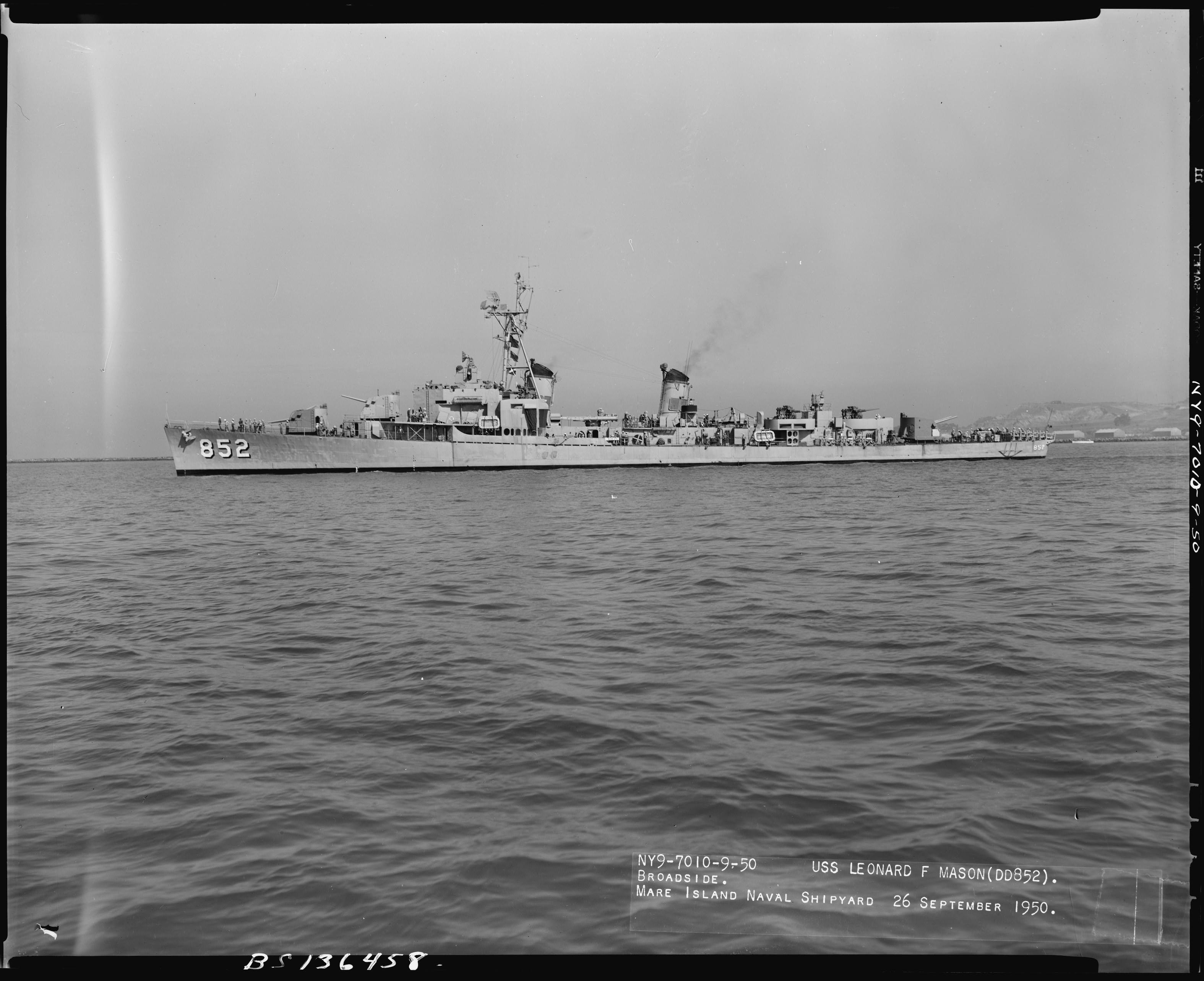
Leonard F. Mason on 26 September 1950

After the close of the Korean War, she departed Yokosuka on 20 November for Long Beach, arrived on 8 December, and readied herself for peacetime duty. Between 1954 and 1960 Leonard F. Mason made three more WestPac cruises, providing an element of security in the turbulent Far East. During the Suez Crisis of November 1956 she sailed with fast carrier TF 11 on guard against any spread of trouble to the Far East.

From May 1960 to May 1962, Leonard F. Mason was homeported at Yokosuka for anti-submarine patrols and other peacekeeping missions. During 1963 she underwent FRAM I conversion at Boston Naval Shipyard, then returned by way of the west coast to Yokosuka on 21 July 1964.

For the next two years, she operated with various task groups of the 7th Fleet, conducting gunfire support missions off the coast of Vietnam, patrolling in the Taiwan Straits, and serving in the Gemini Recovery Force. It was involved in the Battle of East Chongwu.

==== Gemini 8 ====
Long experience and training paid off on 17 March 1966 when Gemini VIII splashed down early, southeast of Okinawa, instead of the intended Caribbean landing site. Leonard F. Mason had astronauts Major David Scott, USAF, and Neil Armstrong and their capsule aboard within three hours and headed for Okinawa, where her passengers and cargo were offloaded the next day.

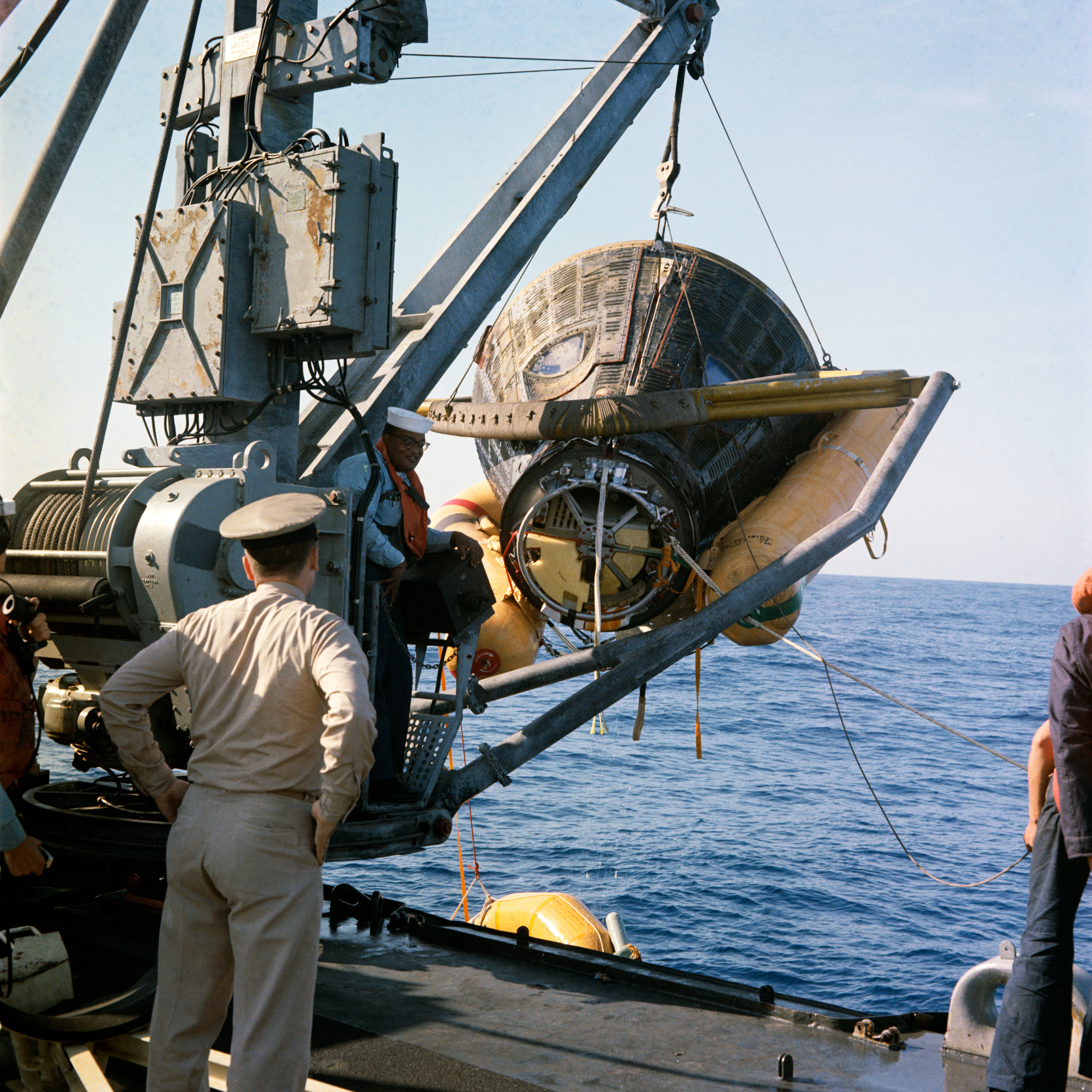
Gemini 8 capsule being hoisted aboard Leonard F. Mason on 16 March 1966

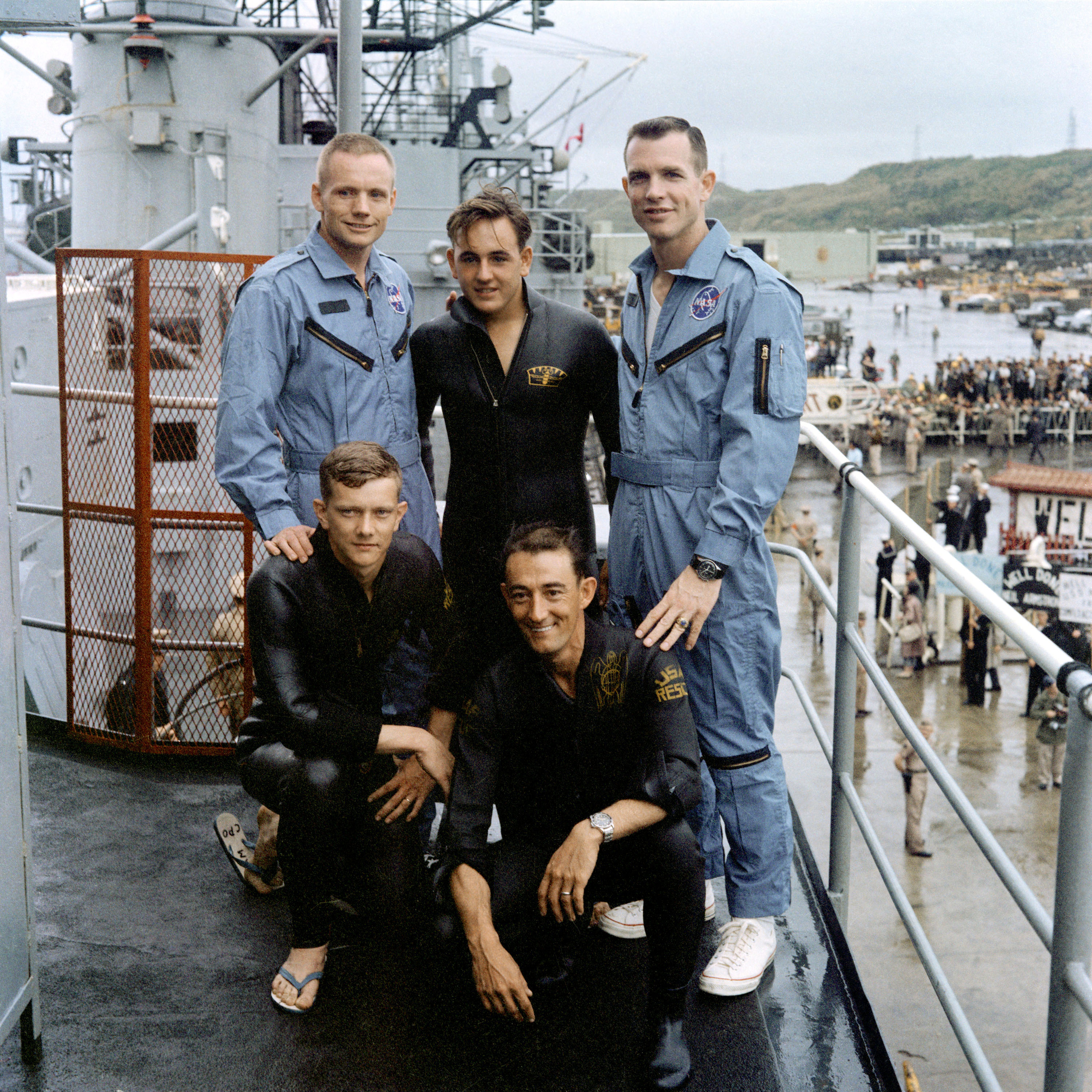
Gemini 8 crew aboard Leonard F. Mason on 17 March 1966

==== Vietnam War ====
Leonard F. Mason then returned to gunfire support chores off Vietnam until June. With an overhaul projected, her home port changed to Long Beach, California. She departed Yokosuka on 17 June and arrived at the west coast on 2 July. The remainder of the year was spent in diverse operations off the California coast, with a trip to Acapulco in November.

On 5 January 1967 the destroyer entered San Francisco Bay Naval Shipyard, Vallejo, California, for overhaul. She returned to Long Beach in May, then resumed local operations, including six weeks of refresher training. On 19 September she departed for WestPac, where she conducted plane guard duty on "Yankee Station" and naval gunfire support, until sailing for home, arriving Long Beach on 12 March. Her stay was not long, however, for she left once again for the Far East at the end of July. Yokosuka again became her homeport on 19 August 1968, and she continued to operate with the 7th Fleet, ranging from Japan to the South China Sea into 1969.

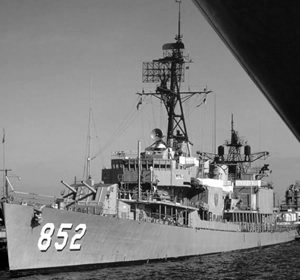
Leonard F. Mason at Naval Station San Diego, in April 1974

In December 1972, Leonard F. Mason participated in "Operation Linebacker II", together with several other Navy destroyers shelled various targets along the coast of North Vietnam. During one mission, Leonard F. Mason came under severe shelling from coastal batteries. The ship's starboard rudder was severely damaged from a round that exploded near the fantail. A chaff device misfired, streaming chaff instead of launching it away from the ship. This resulted in a bright trail on the screens of the coastal radar sites. Crew members reported hearing shell fragments hitting the hull numerous times.

On 12 February 1973, Leonard F. Mason was the final U.S. warship of the Vietnam War to call at the base at Da Nang, Vietnam. From February to March 1973, Mason was attached to Task Force 78 and participated in "Operation End Sweep". Leonard F. Mason rode shotgun for the minesweepers clearing Hai Phong Harbor.

On 2 November 1976, Leonard F. Mason was struck from the Naval Vessel Register.

=== Service in the Republic of China Navy ===
Following her striking, the destroyer was sold to the government of the Republic of China on 10 March 1978 and renamed ROCS Lai Yang or Shuei Yang. The ship was decommissioned on 16 February 2000, and sunk on 11 April 2003 to create an artificial reef.

== Awards ==
Leonard F. Mason received three battle stars for her Korean War service.
