= Leonard F. Mason =

United States Marine Corps Medal of Honor recipient

Leonard Foster Mason
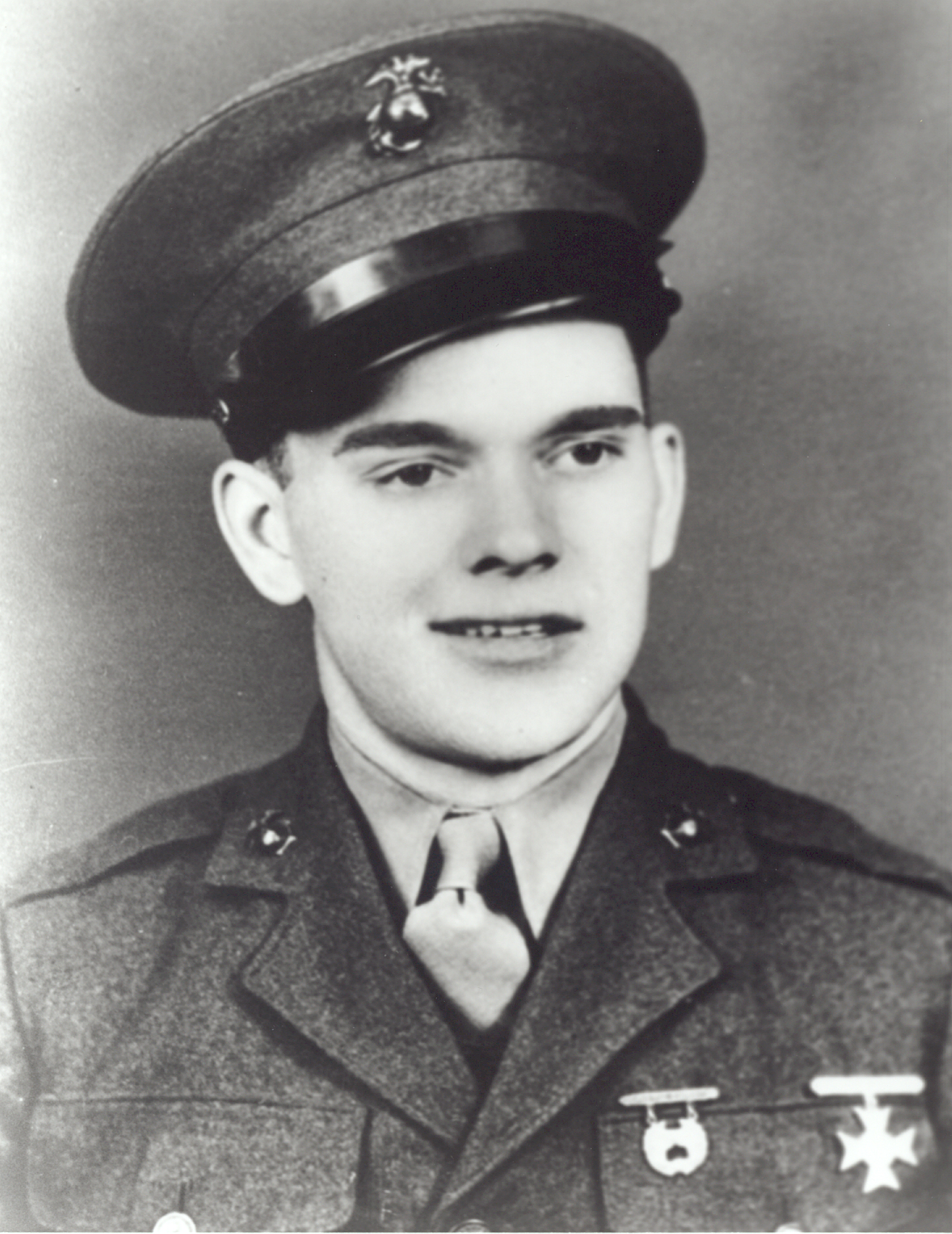
- PFC Leonard F. Mason
- Born: February 22, 1920; Middlesboro, Kentucky
- Died: July 22, 1944 (aged 24); Guam
- Burial place: National Memorial Cemetery of the Pacific, Honolulu, Hawaii
- Military career
- Allegiance: United States of America
- Branch: United States Marine Corps
- Service years: 1943–1944
- Rank: Private First Class
- Units: 2nd Battalion, 3rd Marines, 3rd Marine Division
- Conflicts: World War II: Battle of Guam †
- Awards: Medal of Honor

Leonard Foster Mason (February 22, 1920 – July 22, 1944) served in the United States Marine Corps during World War II. He was posthumously awarded the Medal of Honor for heroism during the Battle of Guam where he was mortally wounded.

== Biography ==
Leonard Foster Mason was born on February 22, 1920, in Middlesboro, Kentucky, the child of Hillery Mason Sr. (1894–1957) and Mollie Partin (1897–1990). He had at least 11 siblings. He enlisted in the Marine Corps in April 1943 and was promoted to private first class in March 1944.

During the landing on Guam, on July 22, 1944, two enemy machine guns opened fire on Mason's platoon. Although mortally wounded, Mason cleared out the hostile position, acting on his own initiative. His heroic act in the face of almost certain death enabled his platoon to accomplish its mission. He posthumously received the Medal of Honor. Mason died the following day of his wounds.

At the time of his passing, he was married to Donna Potts (later Sites; 1923–1989). The two had one child, Larry Eugene Mason.

== Medal of Honor citation ==
Rank and organization: Private First Class, U.S. Marine Corps. Born: February 22, 1920, Middlesboro, Ky. Accredited to: Ohio.

Citation

For conspicuous gallantry and intrepidity at the risk of his life above and beyond the call of duty as an automatic rifleman serving with the 2d Battalion, 3d Marines, 3d Marine Division, in action against enemy Japanese forces on the Asan-Adelup Beachhead, Guam, Marianas Islands on 22 July 1944. Suddenly taken under fire by 2 enemy machineguns not more than 15 yards away while clearing out hostile positions holding up the advance of his platoon through a narrow gully, Pfc. Mason, alone and entirely on his own initiative, climbed out of the gully and moved parallel to it toward the rear of the enemy position. Although fired upon immediately by hostile riflemen from a higher position and wounded repeatedly in the arm and shoulder, Pfc. Mason grimly pressed forward and had just reached his objective when hit again by a burst of enemy machinegun fire, causing a critical wound to which he later succumbed. With valiant disregard for his own peril, he persevered, clearing out the hostile position, killing 5 Japanese, wounding another and then rejoining his platoon to report the results of his action before consenting to be evacuated. His exceptionally heroic act in the face of almost certain death enabled his platoon to accomplish its mission and reflects the highest credit upon Pfc. Mason and the U.S. Naval Service. He gallantly gave his life for his country.

== Awards and decorations ==

1st row	Medal of Honor	Purple Heart	Combat Action Ribbon
2nd row	Presidential Unit Citation	Navy Unit Commendation	Marine Corps Good Conduct Medal
3rd row	American Campaign Medal	Asiatic-Pacific Campaign Medal with 2 Campaign stars	World War II Victory Medal

== Namesake ==
In 1946, the destroyer USS Leonard F. Mason (DD-852) was named in his honor.

In 2013, the City of Middlesboro, Kentucky renamed a portion of Cumberland Avenue, the main street downtown, in his honor; it is now known as Leonard F. Mason Medal of Honor Memorial Highway.

== See also ==
- List of Medal of Honor recipients for World War II
