= Lewis K. Bausell =

Medal of Honor recipient (1924–1944)

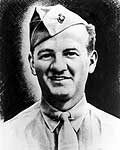
- Lewis K. Bausell, World War II Medal of Honor recipient
- Born: April 17, 1924; Pulaski, Virginia, U.S.
- Died: September 18, 1944 (aged 20); Peleliu, Palau Islands
- Burial place: buried at sea
- Military career
- Allegiance: United States
- Branch: United States Marine Corps
- Service years: 1941–1944
- Rank: Corporal
- Units: 1st Battalion, 5th Marines, 1st Marine Division
- Conflicts: World War II: Guadalcanal Campaign; Battle of Cape Gloucester; Battle of Peleliu (DOW)
- Awards: Medal of Honor; Purple Heart

Corporal Lewis Kenneth Bausell (April 17, 1924 – September 18, 1944) was a United States Marine and posthumous recipient of the United States' highest military honor — the Medal of Honor — for his sacrifice of life, "above and beyond the call of duty", during World War II. During combat at Peleliu, he covered an exploding Japanese hand grenade in order to protect his comrades, and died of his wounds three days later. Bausell was the only enlisted Marine from the Nation's capital, Washington, D.C. to be awarded the Medal of Honor for actions during World War II.

== Biography ==
=== Early years ===
Lewis Kenneth Bausell was born in Pulaski, Virginia on April 17, 1924. Moving to Washington, he attended the local public schools and then went to work as a bookbinder for Ransdell, Incorporated, a Washington printer. Bausell was employed there at the time of the Japanese attack on Pearl Harbor December 7, 1941.

=== Marine Corps, World War II service ===
The week following the Pearl Harbor attack, on December 15, Bausell enlisted in the U.S. Marine Corps for four years. After training at the Marine Corps Recruit Depot, Parris Island, South Carolina, he joined the 1st Marine Division in New River, North Carolina. Bausell was promoted to Private First Class on March 25, 1942, and to Corporal on June 1. On May 20, the 5th Marines sailed for the Pacific, arriving at Wellington, New Zealand, on June 20. The Marines immediately began preparations for landing in the Solomon Islands.

Corporal Bausell took part in the initial landings on Guadalcanal and fought there for four months before going southward to Melbourne, Australia. In the spring of the next year he sailed for New Guinea.

Serving with the 5th Marine Regiment of the 1st Marine Division, Cpl Bausells prepared for the next campaign, in New Guinea and then made the Cape Gloucester, New Britain, landing three days after the original invasion in December 1943. With that campaign concluded, the division returned to the Solomon Islands and went to Pavuvu Island for rest, rehabilitation, and preparation for another campaign.

The Peleliu landing took place on September 15, 1944, and the 5th Marines were the left flank regiment on the division front. In the first hour of action, the assault waves fought their way 100 yards inland to the top of a small coral ridge, one of dozens on the island. Cpl Bausell, who, one month earlier had been examined and found qualified for promotion to the rank of sergeant, was in a squad assigned to clean out one of the many enemy-infested caves which honeycombed the ridge.

On one side of the cave, a Marine second lieutenant and several of his men used a flame thrower to force the enemy out while Cpl Bausell and several others waited with rifles ready. Two men stood at the entrance, firing into the cave. A Japanese soldier charged out holding a grenade against his body and lunged toward the small band of Marines. The grenade exploded, injuring several Marines and killing the attacker.

As the remaining enemy combatants exited the cave, a grenade was thrown amongst the Marines. Cpl Bausell heroically threw himself on the grenade and saved the lives of his fellow Marines.

Cpl Bausell was evacuated to a hospital ship where after three days, on September 18, he succumbed to his wounds. Bausell was buried at sea.

== Decorations and honors ==
The Medal of Honor, posthumously awarded the Marine by President Franklin D. Roosevelt, was presented to his parents in the Navy Department in Washington, D.C. by Secretary of the Navy James Forrestal on June 11, 1945. Gen Alexander A. Vandegrift, then Commandant of the Marine Corps, was present for the ceremony, as were Bausell's sisters and one sister-in-law.

In addition to the Medal of Honor, Cpl Bausell was posthumously awarded the Purple Heart; Presidential Unit Citation; Asiatic-Pacific Campaign Medal with four bronze stars and the World War II Victory Medal.

Medal of Honor
Purple Heart	Combat Action Ribbon	Navy Presidential Unit Citation
American Campaign Ribbon	Asiatic-Pacific Campaign Medal w/ 4 service stars	World War II Victory Medal

On November 19, 1945, in Bath, Maine, a new destroyer, the USS Bausell, was christened by Cpl Bausell's mother. She was a Gearing-class destroyer who served in the United States Navy during the Korean War and the Vietnam War.

=== Medal of Honor citation ===
The President of the United States takes pride in presenting the MEDAL OF HONOR posthumously to

CORPORAL LEWIS K. BAUSELLS
UNITED STATES MARINE CORPS

for service as set forth in the following CITATION:

For conspicuous gallantry and intrepidity at the risk of his life above and beyond the call of duty while serving with the First Battalion, Fifth Marines, First Marine Division, during action against enemy Japanese forces on Peleliu Island, Palau Group, September 15, 1944. Valiantly placing himself at the head of his squad, Corporal Bausell led the charge forward against a hostile pillbox which was covering a vital sector of the beach and, as the first to reach the emplacement, immediately started firing his automatic into the aperture while the remainder of his men closed in on the enemy. Swift to act as a Japanese grenade was hurled into their midst, Corporal Bausell threw himself on the deadly weapon, taking the full blast of the explosion and sacrificing his own life to save his men. His unwavering loyalty and inspiring courage reflect the highest credit upon Corporal Bausell and the United States Naval Service. He gallantly gave his life for his country.

/S/ FRANKLIN D. ROOSEVELT

== See also ==
- List of Medal of Honor recipients
- List of Medal of Honor recipients for World War II
