= San Francisco Bay Naval Shipyard =

Former US Navy shipyards

- San Francisco, California
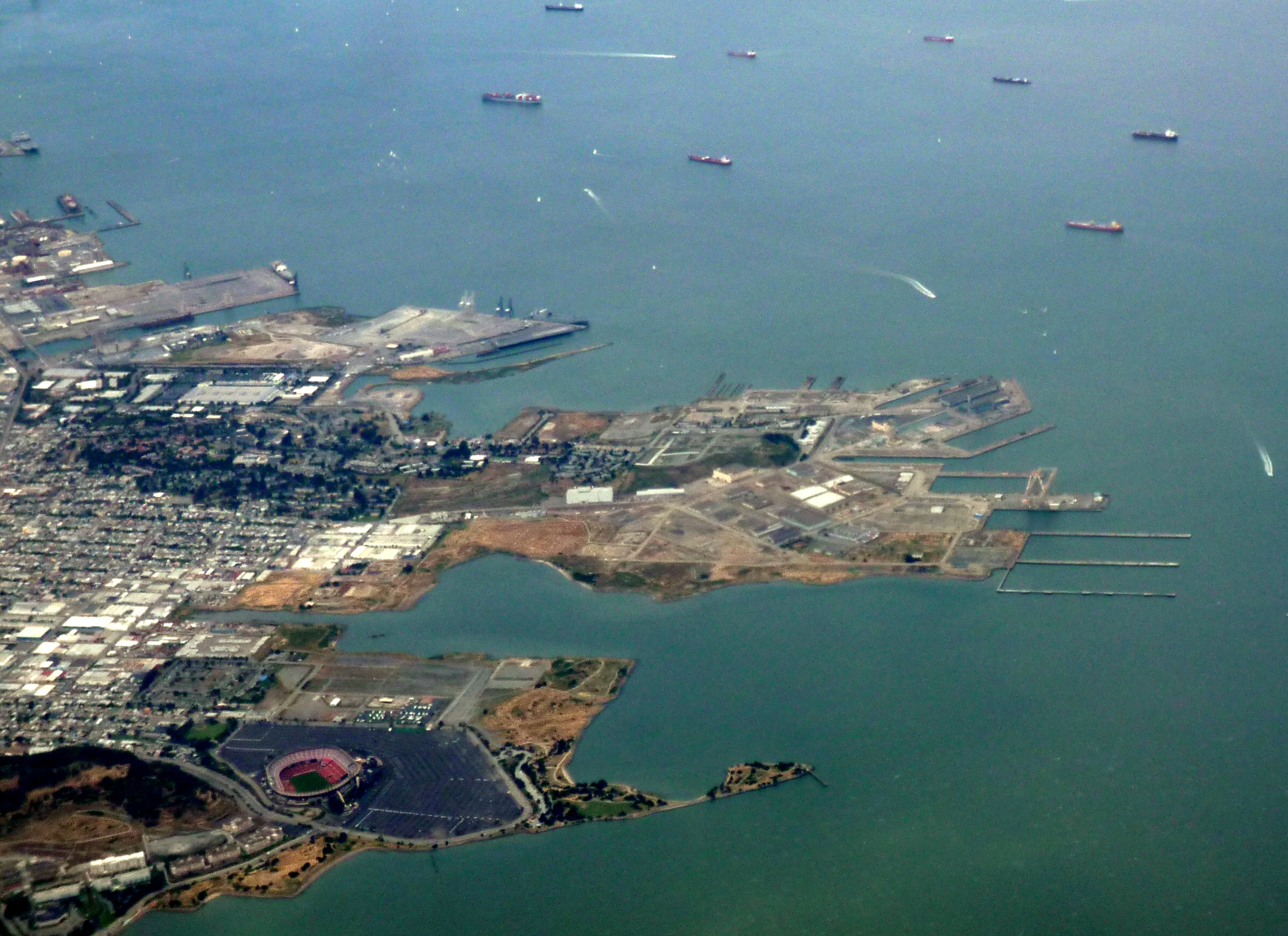
- San Francisco Bay Naval Shipyard Hunters Point Division

Site information
- Type: Shipyard
- Controlled by: United States Navy

Site history
- Built: 1965
- In use: 1965-1970

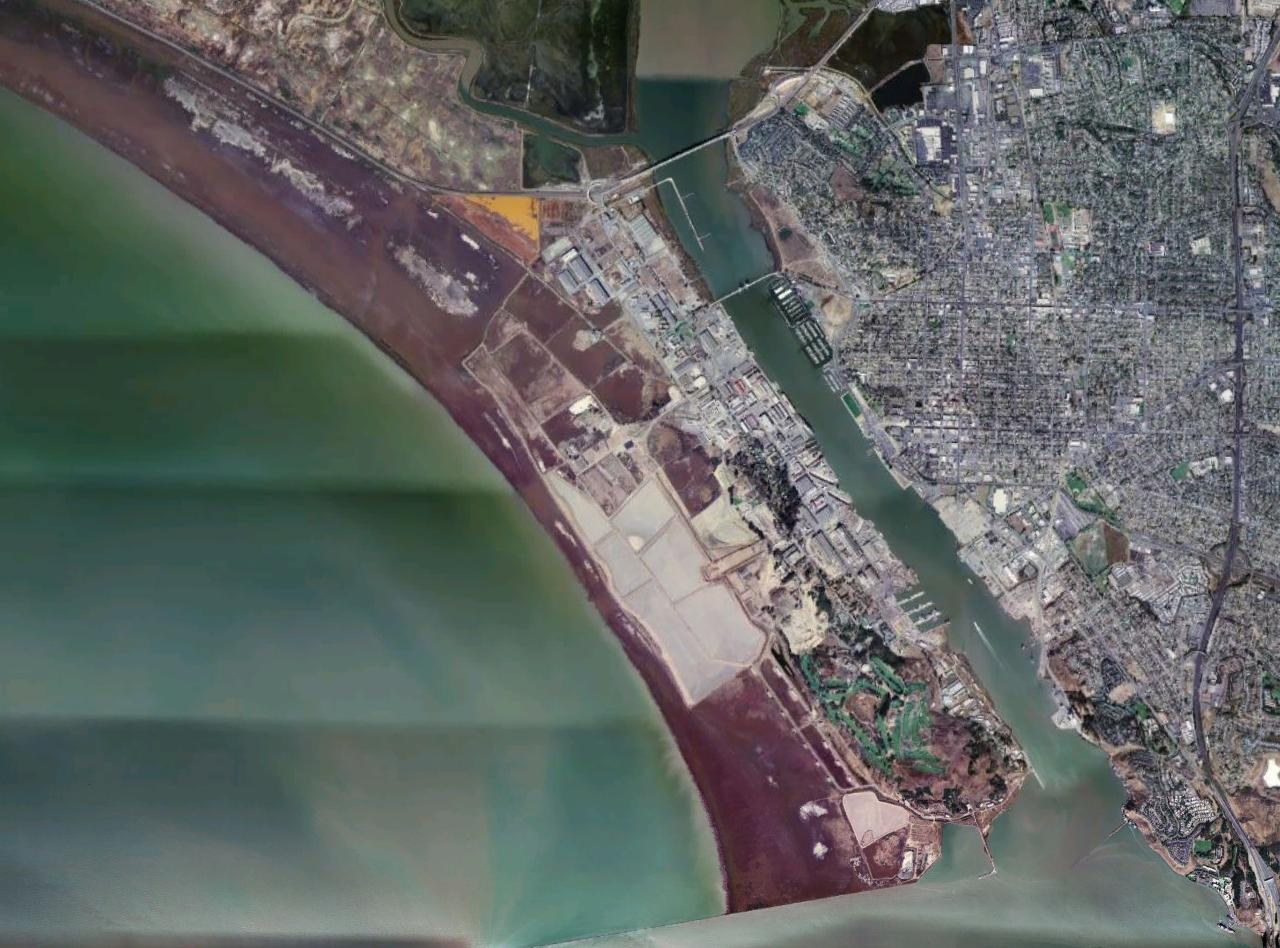
San Francisco Bay Naval Shipyard Mare Island Division

The San Francisco Bay Naval Shipyard was a short-lived shipyard formed in 1965 with the combination of the Hunters Point Naval Shipyard and the Mare Island Naval Shipyard. The combined yards were the largest naval shipyard in the world, but the desired cost savings did not materialize, and the two yards reverted to separate management in February 1970. The Hunters Point shipyard was used for radioactive testing when the United States was testing the atomic bombs. The site has since been contaminated. The Hunters Point Naval Shipyard became a Superfund site, as designated by the Environmental Protection Agency (EPA). It is the Navy's requirement to clean up the site to "reasonable" levels to those who live adjacent to the shipyard.

The two shipyards were called:

- San Francisco Bay Naval Shipyard Hunters Point Division (San Francisco Naval Shipyard)
- San Francisco Bay Naval Shipyard Mare Island Division

== Pacific Reserve Fleet, San Francisco ==
Pacific Reserve Fleet, San Francisco Group was the combination United States Navy reserve fleets of mothballed stored ships and submarines. Pacific Reserve Fleet, San Francisco Group being made of the Pacific Reserve Fleet, Mare Island and Pacific Reserve Fleet, Hunters Point (Pacific Reserve Fleet, San Francisco Group may also refer to only the Reserve Fleet at Hunters Point). Some ships in the fleet were reactivated for the Vietnam War.

== See also ==
- Rosie the Riveter/World War II Home Front National Historical Park
- California during World War II
