= 54 Squadron =

54 Squadron or 54th Squadron may refer to:

- No. 54 Squadron RAF, United Kingdom
- 54th Aero Squadron, Air Service, United States Army, see list of American aero squadrons
- 54th Air Refueling Squadron, United States Air Force
- 54th Helicopter Squadron, United States Air Force
- 54th Fighter Squadron, United States Air Force
- 54th Weather Reconnaissance Squadron, United States Air Force
- VA-54 (U.S. Navy)
- Second VA-54 (U.S. Navy)
- VPB-54, United States Navy
- VR-54, United States Navy

== See also ==
- Jagdgeschwader 54
