= Operation Inland Seas =

Operation Inland Seas (or Sea) was a United States Navy operation to celebrate the completion of the Saint Lawrence Seaway in 1959. Task Force 47 (TF 47), a 28-ship detachment of the U.S. Atlantic Fleet under the command of Rear Admiral Edmund B. Taylor, sailed up the Saint Lawrence River to participate in the official opening of the Seaway by Queen Elizabeth II of Canada and U.S. President Dwight D. Eisenhower on June 26, 1959. Thereafter, the ships visited ports throughout the Great Lakes, sometimes escorting Queen Elizabeth aboard HMY Britannia.

== Participating U.S. Navy ships ==
- Heavy cruiser:
  - USS Macon (CA-132)
- Destroyer leader:
  - USS Willis A. Lee (DL-4) (flagship, TF 47)
- Destroyers:
  - USS Ault (DD-698)
  - USS Waldron (DD-699)
  - USS Haynsworth (DD-700)
  - USS John W. Weeks (DD-701)
  - USS Putnam (DD-757)
  - USS Henley (DD-762)
  - USS Willard Keith (DD-775)
  - USS Samuel B. Roberts (DD-823)
  - USS Warrington (DD-843)
  - USS Joseph P. Kennedy, Jr. (DD-850)
  - USS Charles H. Roan (DD-853)
  - USS Charles R. Ware (DD-865)
  - USS Forrest Royal (DD-872)
  - USS Forrest Sherman (DD-931)
  - USS Du Pont (DD-941)
- High speed transport:
  - USS Kleinsmith (APD-134)
- Dock landing ships:
  - USS Donner (LSD-20)
  - USS San Marcos (LSD-25)
- Tank landing ships:
  - USS Terrebonne Parish (LST-1156)
  - USS Suffolk County (LST-1173)
- Submarines:
  - USS Sablefish (SS-303)
  - USS Torsk (SS-423)
  - USS Quillback (SS-424)
  - USS Corsair (SS-435)
- Attack transport:
  - USS Cambria (APA-36)
- Attack cargo:
  - USS Oglethorpe (AKA-100)
- Auxiliary ocean tug:
  - USS Catawba (ATA-210)
