= USS Nanigo =

Tugboat of the United States Navy

History

United States
- Name: USS Nanigo
- Builder: Consolidated Shipbuilding Corp., Morris Heights, New York
- Laid down: 6 December 1944
- Launched: 27 March 1945
- Commissioned: 30 August 1945
- Reclassified: YTM–537, February 1962
- Stricken: 1 September 1973
- Fate: Lost while under tow, 7 April 1972

General characteristics
- Type: Tugboat
- Displacement: 237 long tons (241 t)
- Length: 100 ft (30 m)
- Beam: 25 ft (7.6 m)
- Draft: 11 ft 6 in (3.51 m)
- Speed: 12 knots (22 km/h; 14 mph)
- Complement: 8

USS Nanigo (YTB-537/YTM-537), a harbor tug of the United States Navy, was laid down on 6 December 1944 by the Consolidated Shipbuilding Corp., Morris Heights, New York, launched on 27 March 1945; and placed in service on 30 August 1945.

== Service history ==
=== 1945–1948 ===
Designed for harbor duties of towing, firefighting, and assisting ships in berthing and docking, Nanigo - initially allocated to the 3rd Naval District - was assigned to Task Force 23 for shakedown training and availability. Upon completion of her fitting out, she proceeded to Norfolk, Virginia, to report to Commander, Training Group, Chesapeake Bay area, Commander, Task Group 23.8, for duty in connection with shakedown. Upon completion of that period of working-up, she underwent post-shakedown availability at Norfolk Naval Shipyard.

Required by Commander, Service Force, Pacific Fleet, she reported for duty with Commander in Chief, Pacific Fleet/Commander, Pacific Ocean Area, on 26 October 1945. Ultimately, she departed Pearl Harbor on 19 January 1946 and sailed west to Kwajalein. Arriving on the 29th, she reported for duty under Atoll Commander, Kwajalein, as relief for YTM-469 and joined in preparing that island for the increased shipping expected in connection with the forthcoming Operation Crossroads, the 1946 atomic test series. On her return to the United States, Nanigo prepared for inactivation and on 19 February 1948 was placed out of service, in reserve, at Puget Sound Naval Shipyard, Bremerton, Washington.

=== 1950–1971 ===
Reactivated and placed in service in September 1950, Nanigo was assigned to the 13th Naval District at Seattle, Washington. Reclassified as a medium tug, YTM-537, in February 1962, she served that district until transferred, late in 1967, to the 17th Naval District at Kodiak, Alaska. Assigned then to Naval Station, Adak, punctuating her tour with routine overhauls at Seattle, Nanigo operated there into the spring of 1972. On 7 February 1970, the tug brought the U.S. fishing vessel Aleutian Queen, that had lost steering control 130 miles (210 km) northwest of Adak, into port for repairs. On 3 August 1970, when the captain's gig ran aground with a fishing party 100 feet (30 m) offshore in Finger Bay, Nanigo and a station medium landing craft (LCM) retrieved the fishermen without incident. Between 10 and 14 December 1971, Nanigo most likely participated as one of the three station tugs that assisted fleet tug Cree (ATF-84), temporarily deployed to Naval Station, Adak, in fighting fires on board the gutted Japanese fishery factory vessel Katata Maru in gale-force winds and bitter temperatures.

=== Loss, 1972 ===
On 1 April 1972, fleet tug Takelma (ATF-113) took the unmanned Nanigo in tow and stood out from Adak, bound for Bremerton, Washington. Takelma and her charge encountered heavy seas on 7 April, and the towline parted. Over the next four days, assisted by naval aircraft, the tug searched for her lost tow, ultimately without success. The operation was suspended on 11 April 1972; Nanigo was never recovered.
