= USS Ault =

Allen M. Sumner-class destroyer

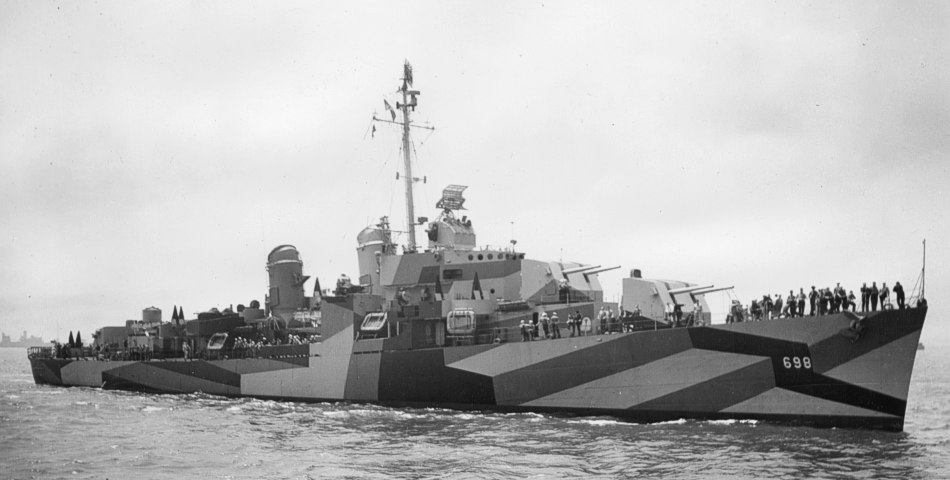
- USS Ault (DD-698), 30 May 1944

History

United States
- Name: Ault
- Namesake: William B. Ault
- Builder: Federal Shipbuilding and Drydock Company
- Laid down: 15 November 1943
- Launched: 26 March 1944
- Commissioned: 31 May 1944
- Decommissioned: 16 July 1973
- Stricken: 1 September 1973
- Honors and awards: 7 × battle stars
- Fate: Sold 30 April 1974 and broken up for scrap.

General characteristics
- Class & type: Allen M. Sumner-class destroyer
- Displacement: 3,218 tons (full)
- Length: 376.5 ft (114.8 m)
- Beam: 41 ft (12.5 m)
- Draft: 14 ft (4.3 m)
- Propulsion: 60,000 shp (45,000 kW); GE geared turbines, 2 screws
- Speed: 36.5 knots (67.6 km/h; 42.0 mph)
- Range: 3,300 nmi (6,100 km; 3,800 mi) at 20 knots (37 km/h; 23 mph)
- Complement: 336
- Armament: 6 × 5-inch 38 caliber cal. DP guns; 12 × 40 mm AA; 11 × 20 mm AA; 10 × 21 inch (533 mm) torpedo tubes

USS Ault (DD-698) was an Allen M. Sumner-class destroyer in the United States Navy. She was named for Commander William B. Ault, air group commander aboard Lexington. Commander Ault was declared missing in action on 8 May 1942 after leading an air attack in the Battle of the Coral Sea and was posthumously awarded the Navy Cross for his action in the battle.

Built by Federal Shipbuilding and Drydock Company, Kearny, New Jersey Ault was laid down 15 November 1943, launched 26 March 1944, sponsored by Mrs. Margaret Ault, Commander Ault's widow. Ault was commissioned 31 May 1944, Commander Joseph C. Wylie in command.

== Service history ==
=== World War II ===
After fitting out, the destroyer departed New York on 10 July 1944 for shakedown training in the Caribbean. She returned to New York for post-shakedown availability and to complete preparations for the long cruise to join the action in the Pacific. Acting as an escort for the cruiser Wilkes-Barre, Ault sailed on 6 September for Trinidad. Detached from escort duty upon her arrival, she transited the Panama Canal and proceeded independently via San Diego to Pearl Harbor where she arrived on 29 September.

After three months of intensive training in Hawaiian waters, the warship got underway on 18 December and headed west to join Vice Admiral John S. McCain's Fast Carrier Task Force. After a refueling stop at Eniwetok on Christmas Day, Ault entered Ulithi Lagoon on 28 December 1944 and, along with her sister ships of Destroyer Squadron 62 (DesRon 62), reported to Rear Admiral Gerald F. Bogan for duty in the escort screen of Task Group 38.2 (TG 38.2).

When Ault reached the forward area, Leyte was in American hands; but the Philippines were still the focus of the aircraft carrier's operations, and they were directed to strike targets on Luzon and Formosa early in January 1945. Ault sortied on 30 December 1944 with TG 38.2 screening that task group. After the strike on Formosa on 9 January, the destroyer in company with Waldron, Charles S. Sperry, and John W. Weeks, swept Bashi Channel ahead of Task Force 38 (TF 38), while proceeding into the South China Sea. Heavy weather as well as the proximity of the enemy created a tense atmosphere in which the carriers continued to mount strikes against the Cam Ranh Bay area, Hong Kong, Hainan, Swatow, and the Formosa Strait. Returning to the Pacific through the Balintang Channel on the night of 20 January, the task force launched final strikes against Formosa and Okinawa before returning to Ulithi on 25 January.

Shortly before the assault on Iwo Jima, TF 38 was reorganized as TF 58 under Vice Admiral Marc Mitscher. Ault was assigned to Rear Admiral Forrest Sherman's Essex Task Group 58.3, which launched diversionary strikes against Formosa, Luzon, and the Japanese mainland on 16 and 17 February. The carriers provided air cover for the operations on Iwo Jima on 19 February and raided the Tokyo area on the 25th and Okinawa on 1 March before retiring to Ulithi on 4 March.

The destroyer returned to the action with TG 58.3 on 14 March for operations to neutralize Japanese air power during the forthcoming Okinawa campaign. In response to strikes against Kyūshū and Honshū, the Japanese retaliated with air strikes against the task group; and, on 20 March, Ault splashed her first two enemy planes. On 23 and 24 March, the task group launched preinvasion strikes against Okinawa; and, on 27 March, Ault assisted the ships of DesRon 62 and four cruisers in shore bombardment of Minami Daito Shima. The warship's next two months were enlivened by days and nights of continuous general quarters. Kamikaze attacks on 6 and 7 April damaged Haynsworth and Hancock. On 11 April, a suicide plane that missed Essex came perilously close to Ault; but her gunners splashed the plane close aboard her starboard quarter. Kidd was badly hit that day. Ault again participated in the bombardment of Minami Daito Shima on 10 May, then rejoined the task force to assist in repelling heavy enemy air attack. While screening Bunker Hill on the morning of 11 May, Ault splashed one kamikaze, but two others hit the carrier. After rescuing 29 men from the stricken ship, the destroyer escorted her to the replenishment group and rejoined the action on the 13th. During attacks on 13 and 14 May, she succeeded in splashing three more planes. On 1 June, Ault put into San Pedro Bay, Leyte, after 80 days at sea.

Task Force 58 was redesignated TF 38; and, on 1 July, Ault sortied for strikes against the Japanese home islands. On 18 and 19 July, the ship joined with Cruiser Division 18 and other destroyers in an antishipping sweep of Sagami Wan and a bombardment of Nojima Saki. The following day, she rejoined the task group and continued to support the carriers until Japan capitulated on 15 August.

Ault operated off the coast of Honshū on patrol until 2 September when she entered Tokyo Bay and anchored near Missouri during the formal surrender ceremony on board that battleship. The destroyer soon resumed patrol with the task group out of Tokyo and continued that duty until 30 October, when she steamed for Sasebo, Japan, to perform more carrier and escort duties. On 31 December 1945, the destroyer departed Japan, bound for the United States, and arrived at San Francisco on 20 January 1946. After a short respite, she was underway again and headed via the Panama Canal for Boston. Following brief stops along the east coast, the vessel entered the Boston Navy Yard on 26 April 1946 for a well-deserved overhaul.

=== 1947–50 ===
The yard work was completed on 15 March 1947, and Ault steamed to Charleston, South Carolina, her base for local operations and training exercises until 12 July, when she sailed for New Orleans and two years there as a Naval Reserve training ship. During her operations in the Gulf of Mexico and the Caribbean, she visited such ports as Guantanamo Bay Naval Base, Cuba; Kingston, Jamaica; Coco Solo, Canal Zone; Port-au-Prince, Haiti; Veracruz, Mexico; and Puerto Cabezas, Nicaragua. During this period, she also performed planeguard duties for carriers operating out of Pensacola, Florida, and underwent an overhaul in Charleston from 24 February to 11 May 1948.

On 21 August 1949, after a month of intensive training in Guantanamo Bay, Ault put into Norfolk to fit out for her first Mediterranean cruise. From 6 to 16 September, the warship steamed across the Atlantic to join 6th Fleet tactical exercises and maneuvers, including a simulated assault on Cyprus. Her ports of call included Aranci Bay, Sardinia; Cannes, France; Argostoli and Piraeus, Greece; and Famagusta, Cyprus. Ault departed Gibraltar on 16 November; headed for the British Isles; and put into Plymouth, England, on 19 November. Prior to leaving Europe, she called at Antwerp, Belgium; Rouen, France; the Isle of Portland, England; and Leith, Scotland. She moored in Norfolk on 26 January 1950 and prepared for inactivation. She was placed out of commission, in reserve, on 31 May and was towed to the Charleston Naval Shipyard for berthing in the Inactive Reserve Fleet.

=== 1950–53 ===
However, her respite was brief. With the outbreak of the Korean War, the Navy needed more active destroyers. On 15 November 1950, Ault was recommissioned at Charleston under the command of Comdr. Harry Marvin-Smith. She steamed to her home port, Norfolk, for the Christmas holidays and to Guantanamo Bay for refresher training in March. After a post-shakedown overhaul in Charleston, the ship returned to her home port, sortied with her sister ships of DesRon 22, and carried out antisubmarine warfare exercises in Cuban waters. She returned to Norfolk on 13 August for upkeep.

Ault sailed for the Mediterranean on 3 September for another tour with the 6th Fleet and stopped for liberty calls in ports in Sicily, Italy, France, Greece, and Portugal. On 30 January 1952, she departed Gibraltar in Destroyer Division 222 (DesDiv 222) and steamed via Bermuda to Norfolk where she arrived on 10 February.

The warship's activities during the first few months of 1952 consisted of training exercises in the Virginia Capes, Caribbean operations, and an upkeep period in Charleston. On 4 June, she embarked midshipmen for a training cruise that took them to Torbay, England; Le Havre, France; and Guantanamo Bay. Upon her arrival back at Norfolk on 4 August, Ault conducted local type training into the new year.

During February 1953, the ship participated in drills in the Caribbean while operating out of St. Thomas and St. Croix, Virgin Islands. On 11 March, she commenced an overhaul in the Charleston Naval Shipyard. Upon completion of the yard work, she steamed back via her home port to Guantanamo Bay where she arrived on 31 July for refresher training. Following two months training and one month loading supplies, Ault departed Norfolk on 2 November with DesDiv 222 for an around-the-world cruise. After transiting the Panama Canal and stopping at San Diego, Pearl Harbor, and Midway, she arrived at Yokosuka, Japan, on 6 December and reported for duty with the 7th Fleet.

On 20 December 1953, Ault collided with Haynsworth during antisubmarine warfare (ASW) exercises in the Sea of Japan. The former's bow was torn off at frame eight. There was one casualty, 20 year old Eugene Merril Whittington of Buffalo, West Virginia, who died of head injuries sustained during the collision. The damaged destroyer was towed to Yokosuka for repairs by Grapple.

=== 1954–66 ===
On 14 March 1954, Ault once again got underway for training and a subsequent voyage westward through the Indian Ocean, the Mediterranean, across the Atlantic Ocean, to arrive home at Norfolk on 4 June. She operated with various warships along the way and made port calls at Hong Kong, Singapore; Colombo, Ceylon; Port Said, Egypt; Athens; Naples; Villefranche-sur-Mer, France; Barcelona, Spain; and Gibraltar. For the remainder of 1954, she operated along the east coast.

For the first six months of 1955, the destroyer conducted Caribbean exercises and local operations, including plane guard duty off Jacksonville, Florida, with carrier Lake Champlain. She entered the Norfolk Naval Shipyard on 1 July for a three-month overhaul which was followed by one month of refresher training at Guantanamo Bay. The warship returned to her home port on 26 November and commenced type training and local operations along the east coast.

On 1 May 1956, Ault sailed for the Mediterranean where she participated in Kiel Week ceremonies in Kiel, Germany; 6th Fleet exercises; and a month and one-half in the Red Sea and the Persian Gulf. The cruise ended with her arrival in Norfolk on 17 September.

On 28 January 1957, Ault got underway again with DesRon 22 for a five-month tour of duty overseas. The destroyer exercised with the 6th Fleet in the Mediterranean and called at ports in Italy, Greece, Turkey, Lebanon, and Sicily before returning to Norfolk in June. After three months of local operations along the east coast, Ault sortied with Essex on 3 September to join other destroyers in North Atlantic and Arctic waters for Operation Strikeback. Upon completion of the exercise, she put into Cherbourg, France, on 30 September for a short leave period before heading home. She moored in Norfolk on 21 October and resumed local operations. On 19 November she entered the Norfolk Naval Shipyard. After a four-month overhaul, refresher training, and upkeep, the destroyer got underway on 17 June 1958 for hunter-killer operations in the Atlantic with Leyte. On 2 September, she steamed in company with DesDiv 222 to the Mediterranean for another six-month deployment before resuming local operations out of Norfolk in March 1959.

In June, the ship entered the Great Lakes for Operation Inland Seas, a celebration honoring the opening of the St. Lawrence Seaway. Later in the year, she assisted the Fleet Sonar School in Key West, Florida, and participated in Atlantic coast exercises.

With the beginning of 1960, Ault was again deployed to the Mediterranean. On 9 March 1960, the destroyer, in company with John W. Weeks, transited the Bosporus and the two became the first U.S. warships to enter the Black Sea since 1945.

Her Black Sea entry was, in part, a secret radio probing mission, for which she was fitted with radio eavesdropping gear manned by civilian technicians. As they entered the Black Sea, Ault and John W. Weeks were followed by a Russian trawler, but all three ships soon stopped when John W. Weeks faked a breakdown by hosting a breakdown flag. The ships sat for some time while Ault was building superheat in her boilers; suddenly, Ault got underway at maximum speed toward Russia, leaving the trawler far behind. The trip's mission was kept secret from the crew until she started moving, at which point the captain announced they were heading to Russia. He also indicated there were American fighters circling just outside the Black Sea, and if they got into trouble, the planes could go supersonic and assist in minutes. The ship headed north, approaching Russia, and then turned around to rejoin the Weeks and depart the Black Sea.

She returned to Norfolk in September and commenced overhaul in December. Ault emerged from the shipyard in March 1961, sailed to Guantanamo Bay for refresher training, and then resumed normal operations. She returned to the Mediterranean in August to participate in NATO Exercises Checkmate I and Checkmate II, and Operation Greenstone. She also took part in Operation Royal Flush V with the British Navy prior to her steaming back to the United States.

In June 1962, Ault entered the Boston Naval Shipyard for a Fleet Rehabilitation and Modernization (FRAM) overhaul. Designed to extend the life of the destroyer by eight years, the overhaul enabled her to meet the challenge of newer and faster enemy submarines. Ault's 40 mm and 20 mm gun mounts were removed, and her 01 level afterdeck was converted to a helicopter flight deck to facilitate the use of drone antisubmarine helicopters (DASH), one of the Navy's newest weapon systems which enabled the destroyer to reach out farther in search of submarine targets.

After completion of the overhaul in February 1963, Ault devoted the rest of the year to improving her readiness and the skill of her crew through various exercises and training cruises. Following a midshipmen cruise during the summer, the ship proceeded to Norfolk to take on DASH and to continue training. Ault was the first destroyer to carry the drones to Europe, when she sortied for the Mediterranean in February 1964 with DesDiv 142. Following participation in NATO exercises and visits at the usual ports in the Mediterranean, the destroyer returned to the United States and a new home port, Naval Station Mayport, Florida. She spent the remainder of the year operating in the Key West area. In January 1965, she participated in Operation Springboard in the Caribbean which was highlighted by several gunnery exercises and the firing of hundreds of rounds of ammunition in shore bombardment exercises at Culebra Island. The warship also trained in Hunter-Killer operations in March and was on station in the western Atlantic for the Gemini 3 space shot.

On 17 March, Ault steered a familiar course toward the Mediterranean. Besides a full three-month schedule of drills, the ship made port calls in Marseille, Golfe-Juan, Livorno, Naples, and Palma before returning to Norfolk to spend the last four months of 1965 in the local operating areas training, requalifying in gunfire support, and going to sea for hurricane evasion. As a result of her intensive training, Ault won the DesRon 14 Battle Efficiency award, as well as Battle "E" awards for both the operations and weapons departments.

Ault participated in Operation "Springboard" in January and February 1966, conducting ASW operations, shore bombardment, a full power run, and various gunnery exercises. She returned to Mayport only to head out to sea again for plane guard duty with Intrepid. Upon her return to her home port, the destroyer underwent a preoverhaul availability and then entered the Charleston Naval Shipyard on 12 April for major work which ended on 14 September.

=== Vietnam War ===
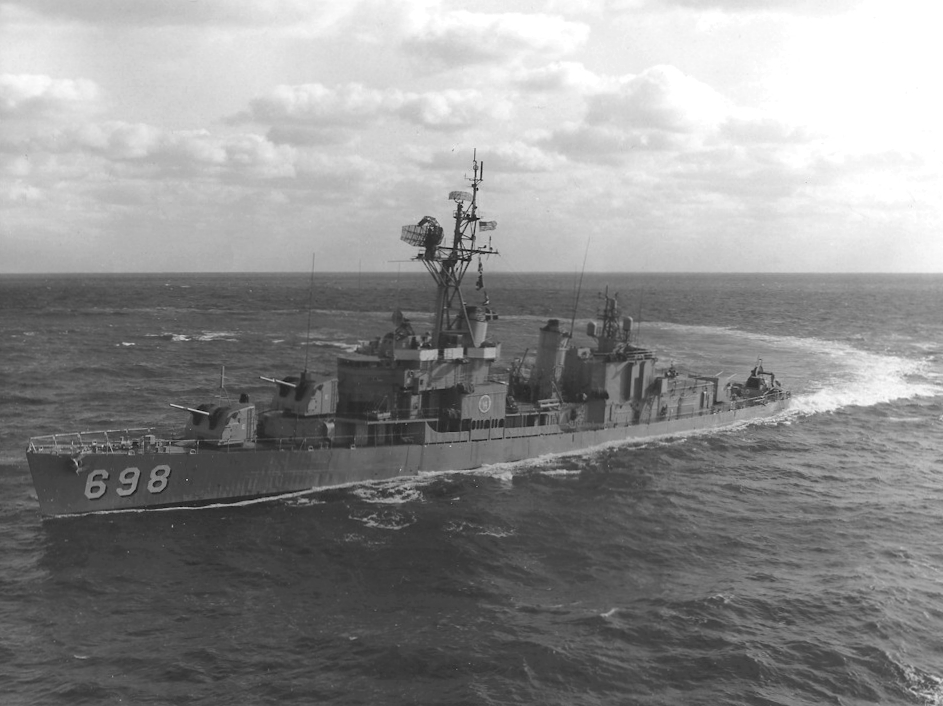
Ault in January 1965, just before her first Vietnam deployment.

She arrived back in Mayport on 7 October 1966 and devoted the last quarter of the year to training at Guantanamo Bay in preparation for a lengthy deployment to Vietnam.

In company with DesDiv 161, Ault departed Mayport on 7 February 1967, transited the Panama Canal on 12 February, and stopped at Pearl Harbor, Midway, and Yokosuka before joining the 7th Fleet on 11 March. After a short period of ASW drills with Spinax near Subic Bay, she steamed with Ticonderoga to station in the Gulf of Tonkin for plane guard duties. On 16 April, the destroyer was assigned to Task Unit 77.1.1 for Operation Sea Dragon, offensive surface operations against waterborne logistic craft and coastal defense sites in North Vietnam. As part of this unit, she joined Collett, Boston, and Hobart in conducting sweeps from Cap Lay north to Thanh Hóa.

The warship was relieved on 30 April and returned to Subic Bay for upkeep. On 7 May, she got underway to the III and IV Corps areas of South Vietnam to provide gunfire support. For the next three weeks, Ault responded to requests for shore bombardment during the day, and for harassment, interdiction, and illumination fire during the night. As the only destroyer available in both Corps areas, she was responsible for the coast from the mouth of the Mekong in the IV Corps area to Vũng Tàu and Hàm Tân in the III Corps area.

From 28 May to 2 June, Ault provided gunfire support in the I Corps area; then proceeded to Kaohsiung, Taiwan, for upkeep alongside Delta and then a week of rest and relaxation in Sasebo. On 19 June, the ship returned to the I Corps area of South Vietnam and, in the next three weeks, fired over 6,000 rounds of 5-inch ammunition at targets in the Quảng Ngãi and Chu Lai areas. After a six-day port visit to Hong Kong and five days of upkeep in Subic Bay, she once again operated in Operation Seadragon, came under heavy fire from coastal defense batteries north of Đồng Hới, but suffered no casualties or damage. On 1 August 1967, Ault completed her Vietnam tour and began her voyage home. She stopped at Kaohsiung, Yokosuka, Midway, Pearl Harbor, San Francisco, and Acapulco, and even made a side trip south of the equator to convert "Pollywogs" into "Shellbacks". The destroyer transited the Panama Canal on 7 September, arrived in Mayport on 11 September, and devoted the remainder of 1967 and the first six weeks of 1968 to leave and upkeep.

=== 1968–74 ===
From 12 to 23 February, Ault participated in Operation Springboard 1968 in the San Juan operating area. On 4 March, she participated in another Caribbean exercise, Operation Rugby-Match, a major fleet exercise which simulated a realistic air, surface, and subsurface threat environment. On 27 April, Ault sailed with Bigelow for the Mediterranean and four months of continuous 6th Fleet operations. She returned to Mayport on 27 September, underwent upkeep, and performed three weeks of planeguard duties in December for Shangri-La. As a reward for her high degree of readiness and training, Ault was again awarded the Battle "E".

For the first quarter of 1969, the destroyer spent most of her time in port at Mayport. She made cruises to the Caribbean in May, June, and July for training and returned to her home port to prepare for her last overseas deployment. Ault sailed for the North Atlantic on 2 September 1969 to participate in the NATO exercise, Operation Peacekeeper. However, her orders were modified on 24 September, and she steamed to the Mediterranean to relieve Zellars. She remained with the 6th Fleet for a three-month cruise highlighted by her participation in Operation Emery Cloth, a British ASW exercise in which Ault was the sole representative of the United States Navy. On 4 December, the warship returned home and prepared for Naval Reserve duty. She was designated a Naval Reserve training ship on 1 January 1970, and steamed to Galveston, Texas, on 12 January. There, she relieved Haynsworth as training ship for Houston area naval reservists.

Ault spent the next three years making training cruises in the Gulf of Mexico and the Caribbean. On 1 May 1973, she departed Galveston for her last cruise, a voyage to NAVSTA Mayport for inactivation. The destroyer was decommissioned on 16 July 1973, ending a career of 29 years service. Struck from the Navy List on 1 September 1973, Ault was sold to the Boston Metals Company, Baltimore, Maryland, and subsequently scrapped.

== Awards ==
Ault earned five battle stars for her service in World War II and an additional two for her service off Vietnam.
