= J.C. Wylie =

American rear admiral (1911–1993)

Joseph Caldwell Wylie, Jr.
- Born: March 20, 1911; Newark, New Jersey
- Died: January 29, 1993 (aged 81); Portsmouth, Rhode Island
- Burial place: Trinity Cemetery
- Military career
- Allegiance: United States of America
- Branch: United States Navy
- Service years: 1928–1972
- Rank: Rear Admiral
- Nicknames: "J. C.", "Bill"
- Commands: USS Trever; USS Ault; USS Arneb; USS Macon; Commander, Cruiser-Destroyer Flotilla Nine; Commandant, First Naval District
- Conflicts: World War II; Pacific War
- Awards: Silver Star; Joint Service Commendation Medal; Two Legions of Merit

Rear Admiral Joseph Caldwell Wylie, Jr., USN, (March 3, 1911 – January 29, 1993) (called "J. C." Wylie or "Bill" Wylie), was an American strategic theorist, author, and US Naval officer. Wylie is best known for writing Military Strategy: A General Theory of Power Control.

== Life ==
J.C. Wylie was born in Newark, New Jersey, on March 3, 1911. He graduated from the United States Naval Academy in 1932. Wylie first saw service on USS Augusta under Captains James O. Richardson, Royal E. Ingersoll, and Chester W. Nimitz. During the later 1930s, he served on USS Reid, USS Altair, and USS Bristol.

In May 1942, Wylie was promoted to executive officer of USS Fletcher. Fletcher participated in the Naval Battle of Guadalcanal and the Battle of Tassafaronga. For his improvised integration of radar, gunnery, and torpedo control during these two actions, Wylie received a Silver Star. He received his first command, USS Trever, in January 1943. After six months, he was assigned to a newly formed Combat Information Center school at Pearl Harbor, where he led a team in writing the first CIC Handbook for Destroyers, Pacific Fleet. Wylie later placed USS Ault into commission as commanding officer and completed his World War II service with a group tasked with countering kamikaze attacks during the planned invasion of Japan.

After World War II, Wylie served as a staff officer with the Office of Naval Research and the Naval War College. During the 1950s, he helped create the practice of having two alternating crews man a ballistic missile submarine. In the mid-1950s, Wylie filled staff jobs as well as commanding USS Arneb and USS Macon and serving as Commander, Cruiser Division Three (later Cruiser-Destroyer Flotilla Nine), Deputy Inspector General of the US Navy, and Deputy Chief of Staff, U.S. Atlantic Fleet. While serving in the latter position, Wylie participated in Operation Power Pack, for which he was awarded his first Legion of Merit. While serving as Admiral John S. McCain Jr.’s deputy, he helped oversee the official investigation into the 1967 USS Liberty incident. He confessed years later in an oral history interview with the Naval War College that he believed the attack to be intentional: “That was deliberate. I don’t know why in God’s name those idiotic people did it, but – I think I’ll not talk about it.” Wylie finished his career by serving as Deputy Commander in Chief, United States Naval Forces Europe and Commandant, First Naval District. Wylie retired from the U.S. Navy on July 1, 1972, after 44 years of service. Upon his retirement, he received a second Legion of Merit.

After his retirement, Wylie served as the first chairman of the USS Constitution Museum Foundation. J.C. Wylie died on January 29, 1993, in Portsmouth, Rhode Island.

== Military Strategy ==
While commanding USS Arneb in 1953, J.C. Wylie began writing Military Strategy, A Theory of Power Control. However, Military Strategy was not published until 1967. A revised edition of Military Strategy, together with articles written by Wylie over the years and a new afterword was published by the Naval Institute Press in 1989, edited with an introduction by John B. Hattendorf.

Military Strategy is a search for a general theory of not just military strategy but strategy in general. In Military Strategy, Wylie defined strategy as:

A plan of action designed in order to achieve some end; a purpose together with a system of measures for its accomplishment.

Wylie defined two patterns of strategy: sequential and cumulative. A sequential strategy involved a planned sequence of events where each event is dependent upon the success of the preceding event. Wylie offered MacArthur's campaign in the Southwest Pacific, Nimitz's campaign in the Central Pacific, and Eisenhower's campaign in Europe as examples of sequential strategies. A cumulative strategy involved a collection of small, disconnected actions that, when taken together, have a significant impact. Wylie uses insurgencies and the U.S. Navy's submarine campaign against Japan in World War II as examples of cumulative strategies. He and his strategies have been compared to Clausewitz to a somewhat successful degree. This would most likely be due to Wylie's approach to individual contingencies and utilization of resources.

After examining the four existing strategic theories of his time (Maritime, Air, Continental, Mao) and their limitations, Wylie presented his own general theory of strategy. To Wylie, control was the essence of strategy:

So it is proposed here that a general theory of strategy should be some development of the following fundamental theme: The primary aim of the strategist in the conduct of war is some selected degree of control of the enemy for the strategist’s own purpose; this is achieved by control of the pattern of war; and this control of the pattern of war is had by manipulation of the center of gravity of war to the advantage of the strategist and the disadvantage of the opponent.

Wylie concluded Military Strategy by demonstrating how control underlies all strategy from courtship to diplomacy to terrorism to war. The type of control used could be anything from influencing the enemy to physically destroying the enemy.
