= USS Forrest Sherman (DD-931) =

US Navy destroyer

Coordinates: 39°53′35″N 75°11′20″W

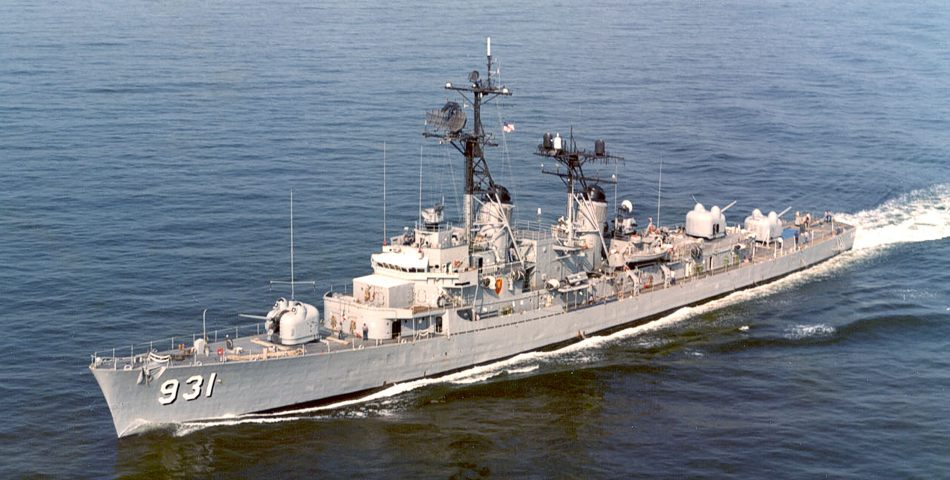
- USS Forrest Sherman c. 1978

History

United States
- Namesake: Forrest Sherman
- Ordered: March 10, 1951
- Builder: Bath Iron Works
- Laid down: October 27, 1953
- Launched: February 5, 1955
- Commissioned: November 9, 1955
- Decommissioned: November 5, 1982
- Stricken: July 27, 1990
- Fate: Sold for scrapping December 15, 2014

General characteristics
- Class & type: Forrest Sherman-class destroyer
- Displacement: 2800 Tons Standard, 4050 Tons full load as built, up to ~4600 Tons later
- Length: 418 feet (127 meters)
- Beam: 45 feet (14 meters)
- Draft: 20 feet (6.1 meters) as built, 22 feet (6.7 meters) later mod.
- Propulsion: 4 1200 psi boilers, 2 geared steam turbines; 2 shafts
- Speed: 32.5 knots (60.2 km/h; 37.4 mph)
- Range: 4,500 miles at 20 knots
- Complement: 324
- Armament: 3 × 5 inch (127 mm) 54-caliber Mark 42 DP guns in single turrets; 2 × Dual 3 inch (76 mm) 50-caliber AA guns; Dual Hedgehog Launchers; 4 single 21-inch tubes amidships as built.; Mk-32 ASW torpedo tubes in two triple mounts later
- Aircraft carried: None; DASH planned for DDG conversions

USS Forrest Sherman (DD-931) was the lead ship of her class of destroyer of the United States Navy. She was named for Admiral Forrest Sherman USN (1896–1951).

== History ==
Forrest Sherman was laid down by the Bath Iron Works Corporation at Bath, Maine, on October 27, 1953; launched on February 5, 1955, by Mrs. Forrest P. Sherman, widow of Admiral Sherman; and commissioned on November 9, 1955.

After a year of initial training and fitting out, Forrest Sherman arrived at her home port, Naval Station Newport in Newport, Rhode Island, January 15, 1957. Two days later she sailed for Washington, D.C., where she was open for public visiting during the week of the second inauguration of President Dwight D. Eisenhower. From Newport, Forrest Sherman sailed on training and fleet exercises along the east coast and in the Caribbean, until the summer of 1957, when she took part in the midshipman cruise to South America and the International Naval Review in Hampton Roads on June 12.

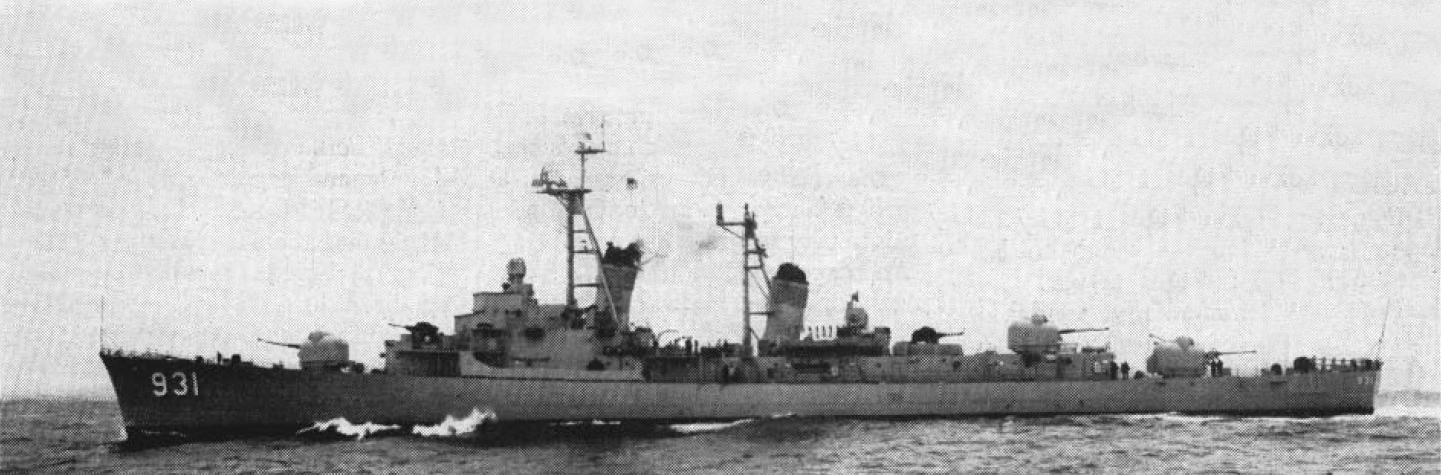
Forrest Sherman shortly after her commissioning in 1955.

On September 3, 1957, Forrest Sherman sailed for NATO Operation Strikeback, screening a carrier striking group in exercises off Norway. She called at Plymouth, England, and Copenhagen, Denmark, before returning to Narragansett Bay on October 22. In preparation for her first deployment to the Mediterranean, the destroyer took part in amphibious exercises off Puerto Rico in July 1958, and arrived at Gibraltar on August 10. She patrolled the eastern Mediterranean through the rest of the month, then sailed to join the 7th Fleet in its operations off Taiwan in support of the threatened islands of Quemoy and Matsu. Sailing eastward to complete a cruise around the world, Forrest Sherman returned to Newport on November 11.

During the summer of 1959, Forrest Sherman joined in Operation Inland Seas, the cruise of a task force into the Great Lakes in celebration of the opening of the St. Lawrence Seaway. She served as escort to the Royal Yacht HMY Britannia with President Dwight D. Eisenhower and Queen Elizabeth II embarked, then sailed on to entertain over 110,000 visitors at Great Lakes ports. Returning to Newport, Forrest Sherman took part in coastal exercises with the Atlantic Fleet, then underwent minor repairs and alterations in the Boston Naval Shipyard.

More training exercises began in 1960 for the destroyer, and on March 21, she sailed on a seven-month cruise to the Mediterranean and duty with the 6th Fleet. En route home in October, Forrest Sherman came to the aid of the Liberian freighter Allen Christensen who had a severely injured man on board. Taking off the patient in a motor whaleboat at night, Forrest Sherman sped him to Bermuda, site of the nearest hospital. The destroyer arrived at Newport on October 15 and some four weeks later entered the Boston Naval Shipyard for major overhaul, lasting into 1961.

== Fate ==
Forrest Sherman was decommissioned on November 5, 1982; stricken from the Naval Vessel Register on July 27, 1990; and sold for scrap to the Fore River Shipyard and Iron Works at Quincy, Massachusetts, on December 11, 1992. When the company went bankrupt, she was resold to N. R. Acquisition Incorporated of New York City by the Massachusetts Bankruptcy Court.

The ship was 'recovered' by the Navy and berthed in the Inactive Ship Facility at the former Philadelphia Naval Shipyard. She was eventually put on a list for donation for museum status. In 2006, Congress passed Pub.L. 109–163, the National Defense Authorization Act of 2006, which authorized the transfer of Forrest Sherman to the USS Forrest Sherman DD-931 Foundation, Inc., a group that planned on moving the ship to Indian River Inlet, Delaware to restore it as a museum. These plans fell through and the ship was removed from donation hold in 2011. Volunteers from other museum ships were allowed to remove useful parts/equipment in June 2011.

The Forrest Sherman was finally sold for scrapping December 15, 2014, and was scrapped by the Defense Logistics Agency Disposition Services.

== Awards ==
- Navy Unit Citation
- Navy Expeditionary Medal
- National Defense Service Medal
- Armed Forces Expeditionary Medal with star
