= William B. Ault =

US commander and recipient of the Navy Cross

William Bowen Ault
- Born: October 6, 1898; Enterprise, Oregon, U.S.
- Died: May 8, 1942 (aged 43); Battle of the Coral Sea
- Burial place: Lost at sea
- Military career
- Allegiance: United States
- Branch: United States Navy
- Service years: 1917–1942
- Rank: Commander
- Service number: 0-057445
- Commands: Torpedo Squadron 6 (VT-6); Naval Reserve Aviation Base, Kansas City, Kansas; Carrier Lexington Air Group (CLAG)
- Conflicts: World War II
- Awards: Navy Cross

William Bowen Ault (6 October 1898 – 8 May 1942) was a commander in the United States Navy during World War II and a posthumous recipient of the Navy Cross. The front page of the June 18, 1942, issue of the Enterprise Chieftain carries the news of Commander William Ault's death in the Pacific.

== Early naval career ==
Ault served briefly as an enlisted man in the Navy (19 April 1917 – 23 April 1918) before entering the Naval Academy as a midshipman. Graduating on 2 June 1922, Ault served at sea on the battleship USS Arkansas (BB-33) before reporting to the Naval Air Station Pensacola, Florida, on 23 August 1924 for flight instruction.

After earning his wings, Ault served with Aircraft Squadrons, Scouting Fleet, before commencing a tour in the aviation unit of the light cruiser USS Cincinnati (CL-6) on 10 September 1925. Detached from that ship just over a year later, he served at the Naval Academy as an instructor before reporting for duty with Observation Squadron (VO) 3, Aircraft Squadrons, Scouting Fleet, on 15 June 1927.

Further duty at the Naval Academy, as an instructor in the Department of Ordnance and Gunnery, followed before he flew with Patrol Squadron (VP) 10-S, Scouting Fleet, based in aircraft tender USS Wright (AV-1). He then served on the staff of Capt. George W. Steele, Commander, Aircraft, Scouting Force, from June 1931 to June 1932 and alternated tours of duty afloat and ashore: in Torpedo Squadron (VT) 1-S, based on board USS Lexington (CV-2); at NAS Norfolk, Virginia; and in the observation unit of the battleship USS Mississippi (BB-41).

Ault—by this time a lieutenant—next assisted in fitting-out USS Yorktown (CV-5), thus becoming a "plank owner" of that ship when she went into commission in the autumn of 1937. He then served on Yorktown's sister ship, USS Enterprise (CV-6), commanding VT-6. On 5 August 1939, less than a month before the start of World War II in Poland, Ault assumed command of the Naval Reserve Aviation Base, Kansas City, Kansas, a billet in which he served into 1941.

On 22 July 1941, Lieutenant Commander Ault once more reported to Lexington, and, the following day, became her air group commander. He was serving in that capacity when the Japanese attack on Pearl Harbor on 7 December 1941 drew the United States into World War II.

== World War II ==
Ault helped to plan and execute the attacks on Japanese shipping at Lae and Salamaua, New Guinea, in March 1942. On the day before the strike, 9 March, Ault and a wingman flew to Port Moresby, where the group commander learned of the existence of a key mountain pass through the forbidding Owen Stanleys, information that, in the words of the task force commander, contributed "a great deal toward [the] success" of the attacks that ensued. On the day of the raid, 10 March, Ault, given the authority to carry out or abort the attack on the basis of what weather he found, flew unaccompanied to the pass and orbited. Finding favorable weather, he transmitted information to that effect and directed the passage of planes from Lexington and Yorktown toward Lae and Salamaua. Those groups sank three transports, put a fourth transport out of action, and caused varying degrees of damage to a light cruiser, a minelayer, three destroyers and a seaplane carrier. The transmontane raid postponed the Japanese projected conquest of Tulagi and Port Moresby for a month, the time necessary to replace the vital amphibious ships lost off New Guinea and marshal carrier air support. Commander, Aircraft Battle Force, later commended Ault for his work.

== Battle of the Coral Sea ==
In the later Battle of the Coral Sea in May 1942, as Lexington's Air Group Commander, Ault led Lexington's bombers into combat in the successful May 7 attack on the Japanese aircraft carrier Shōhō, sinking the light carrier fifteen minutes after the first attack. The Shōhō was the first Japanese aircraft carrier sunk in World War II.

Early in the morning on 8 May, Ault led the Lexington airwing's attack on the Japanese fleet carrier Shōkaku. The attack was successful; the Shōkaku was damaged severely enough to warrant its removal from battle and its return to base at Chuuk.

Both Ault and his radio-gunner, Aviation Radioman 1st Class William T. Butler, apparently suffered wounds when Zero fighters attacked the group commander's SBD Dauntless. Ault attempted to return to a friendly carrier deck, not realizing that the Lexington had taken mortal damage in his absence. Unaware of Lexington's distress, he radioed the ship at 14:49, to tell her that he had only enough gasoline for 20 minutes. Yorktown, which had taken over communications for "Lady Lex," heard Ault's broadcast but failed to pick him up on her radar. Informed that he was on his own but wished "Good luck." Ault changed course to the north, in a last vain attempt to be picked up on radar. Yorktown again wished him good luck.

Ault, perhaps aware of the fate that lay ahead, radioed : "O.K. So long, people. We put a 1,000 pound hit on the flat top." No further word was received from Lexington's air group commander, and neither he nor Aviation Radioman Butler was ever seen again. No remains of his aircraft have ever been found.

Both Ault and Butler were listed as Missing in Action and presumed dead on May 8, 1942.

== Navy Cross ==
Ault's leadership of Lexington's air group in the Battle of the Coral Sea earned him the posthumous award of the Navy Cross.

The citation reads:

The President of the United States takes pride in presenting the Navy Cross (Posthumously) to William Bowen Ault (0-057445), Commander, U.S. Navy, for extraordinary heroism in operations against the enemy while serving as Pilot of a carrier-based Navy Combat Plane and Group commander of a Navy Air Group embarked from the U.S.S. LEXINGTON (CV-2), in action against enemy Japanese forces during the Air Battle of the Coral Sea, on 7 and 8 May 1942. Commander Ault led the air attack in the face of severe antiaircraft barrage and heavy fighter opposition, which resulted in the complete destruction of one enemy carrier on 7 May and major damage to another on 8 May. His failure to return from the latter encounter and his courageous conduct throughout the duration of these actions were an inspiration to the entire air group. Commander Ault's outstanding courage, daring airmanship and devotion to duty were in keeping with the highest traditions of the United States Naval Service. He gallantly gave his life for his country.

== Legacy ==
On September 25, 1943, the airfield at Naval Air Station Whidbey Island was named for Commander Ault.

The USS Ault (DD-698), an Allen M. Sumner class destroyer in the United States Navy launched 26 March 1944, was also named for him.

== See also ==
- List of people who disappeared mysteriously at sea
