= ARA Comodoro Somellera =

Rescue tug that served in the Argentine Navy

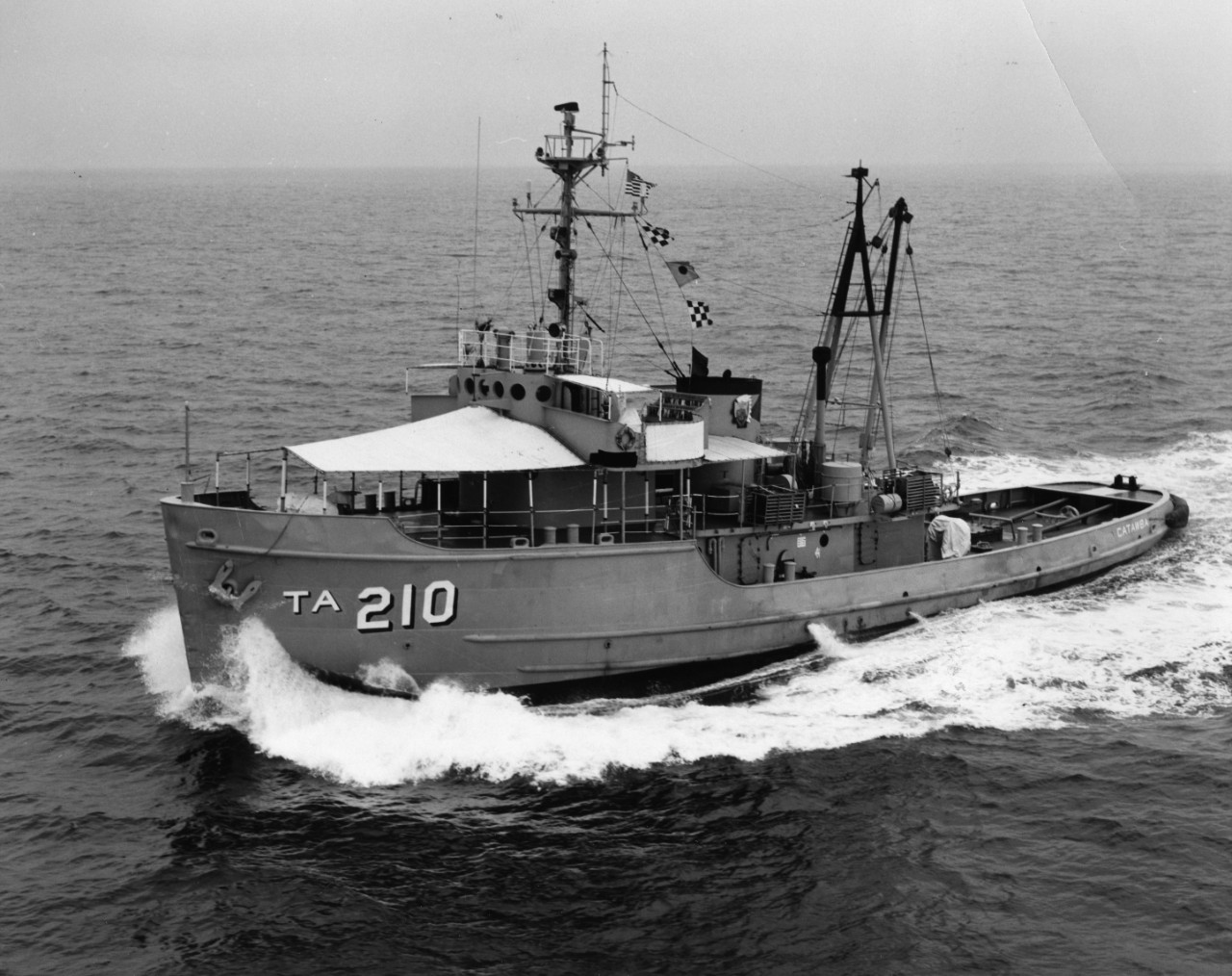
- USS Catawba

History

United States
- Name: Catawba
- Namesake: Catawba River
- Builder: Gulfport Boiler & Welding Works
- Launched: 15 February 1945
- Commissioned: 1945
- Decommissioned: 1972
- Fate: transferred to Argentine Navy, 1972
- Stricken: 1 February 1972

Argentina
- Name: Comodoro Somellera
- Acquired: 10 February 1972
- Commissioned: 10 February 1972
- Out of service: 1998
- Fate: Sunk during storm in Port of Ushuaia in 1998, hull recovered and stored before use as a target in 2017

General characteristics
- Class & type: Sotoyomo-class tugboat
- Displacement: 835 tons (848 t) (full)
- Length: 143 ft (44 m)
- Beam: 33 ft 10 in (10.31 m)
- Draft: 13 ft 2 in (4.01 m)
- Propulsion: Diesel-electric engines, 1,500 shp (1,100 kW) single screw
- Speed: 13 knots (24 km/h; 15 mph)
- Complement: 45–49
- Armament: as Catawba; 1 × single 3 in (76 mm)/50 gun; 2 × twin 40 mm AA guns; as Somellera; 1 × 40 mm /60 Bofors gun; 2 × Oerlikon 20 mm cannon

ARA Comodoro Somellera (A-10) was a Sotoyomo-class rescue tug that served in the Argentine Navy from 1972 to 1998 classified as an aviso. She previously served in the US Navy as USS Catawba (ATA-210) from 1945 to 1972. After being damaged beyond repair in 1998, she was deliberately sunk as a weapons target in November 2017.

== Description ==
The tug was 143 feet (44 m) long, with a beam of 34 feet (10 m). She had a displacement of 835 tons.

== US Navy service ==
Catawba was laid down as ATR-137 at Gulfport Boiler & Welding Works shipyard in Port Arthur, Texas and reclassified ATA-210 on 15 May 1944. The ship was launched on 15 February 1945 and commissioned by the United States Navy on 18 April 1945. The third ship of the United States Navy to carry the name, she was named after the Catawba River, in North Carolina. In 1959 she served in Operation Inland Seas. She was decommissioned in 1972 and transferred to the Argentine Navy.

== Argentine service ==
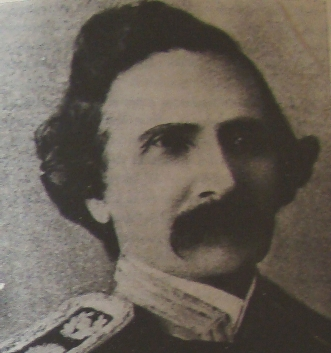
Antonio Somellera

The ship was named after Commodore Antonio Somellera, who joined the Argentine Navy in 1828 with his brigantine General Rondeau to fight in the Cisplatine War. She was acquired in 1972 along with her sister ship ARA Alférez Sobral, departing together from Mayport, Florida on 6 March 1972 and arriving at Puerto Belgrano on 18 April.

Both ships served during the 1982 Falklands War where they were involved in a confused episode. The British claimed, incorrectly as it later turned out, to have sunk Comodoro Somellera with a Sea Skua missile; the British subsequently dropped the claim after re-evaluating evidence after the war. Comodoro Somellera spent the period of the war in the opening of the Strait of Magellan. From 1988 she was assigned to Ushuaia naval base until 1995, when she was transferred back to Puerto Belgrano.

In 1997, she participated in Operacion Calypso, an attempt to locate German U-boats sunk along the Patagonian coast.

The ship continued to serve in the Argentine Navy until 19 August 1998 when, after finishing an exercise with the Chilean Navy, she sank in the port of Ushuaia during a storm following a collision with the patrol tug ARA Suboficial Castillo. The ship was later refloated, but the hull was considered too old to be repaired and was finally retired from the naval service, being expended as a target ship in November 2017, when Comodoro Somellera was sunk by an Exocet missile fired by the destroyer ARA La Argentina.
