= Second VA-54 (U.S. Navy) =

Attack Squadron 54
- Active: 26 March 1945 – 1 April 1958
- Country: United States
- Branch: United States Navy
- Role: Attack
- Part of: Inactive
- Nickname(s): Copperheads; Hell's Angels
- Engagements: Korean War

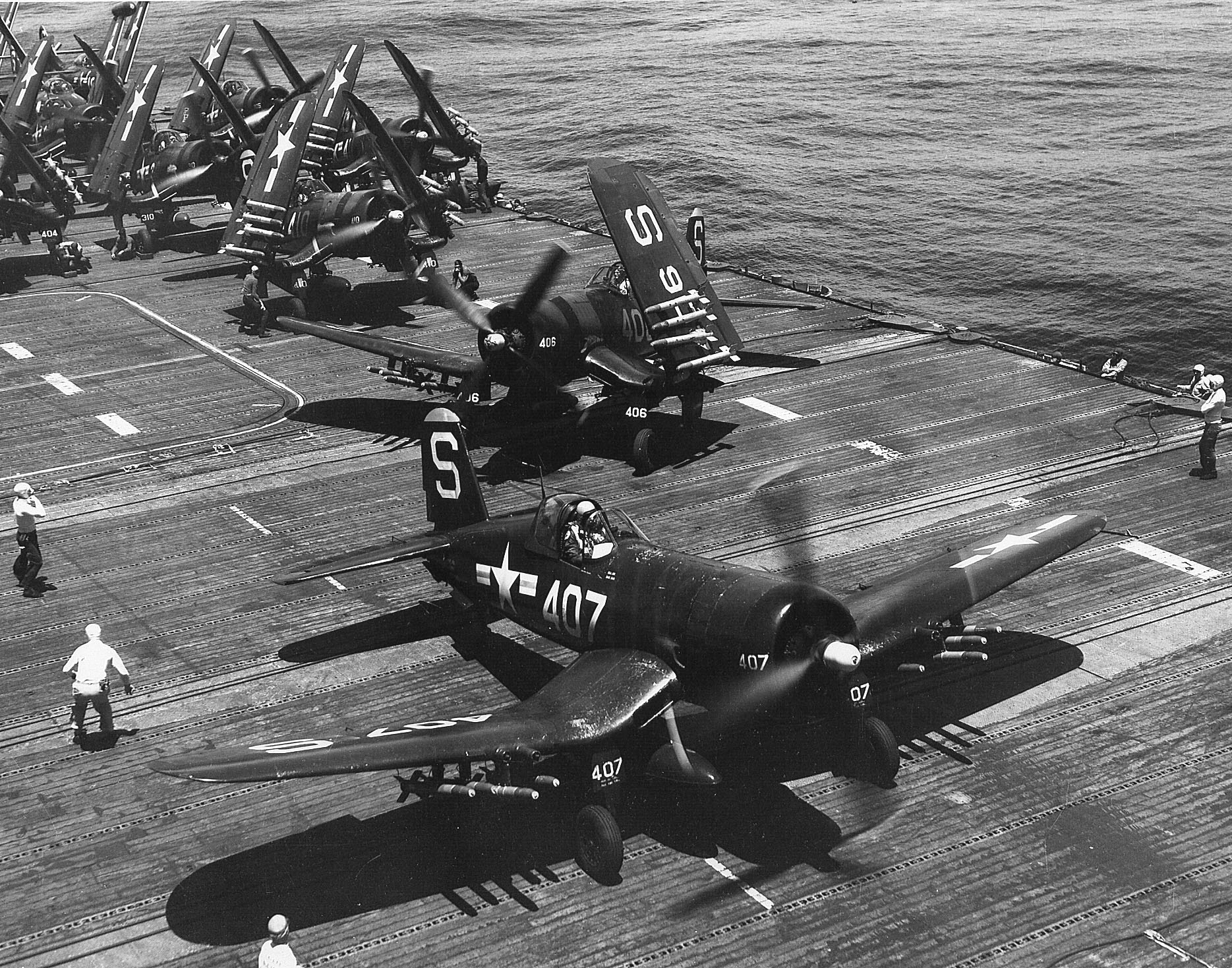
VF-54 F4U-4Bs on USS Valley Forge in 1950

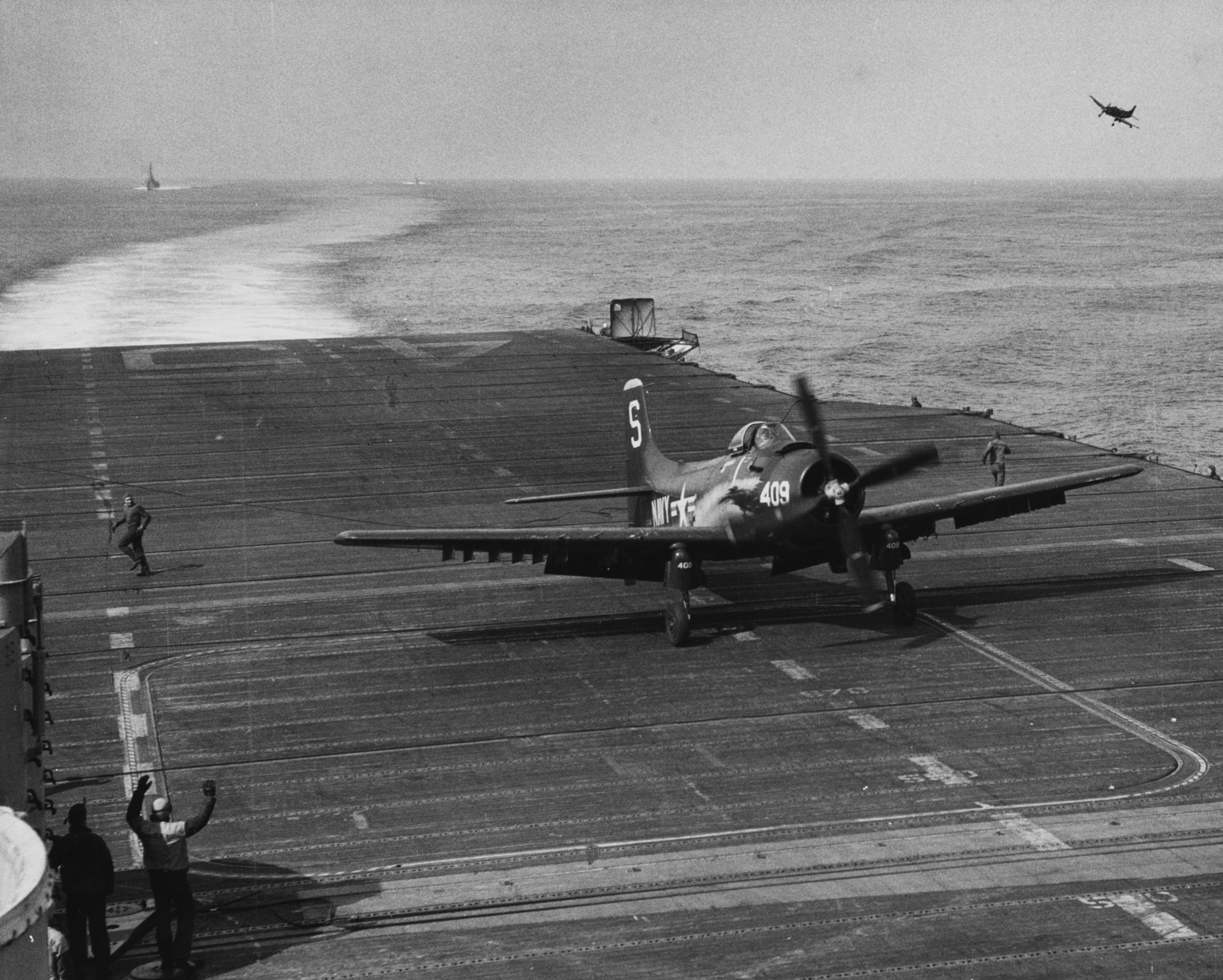
VF-54 AD-4 lands on USS Valley Forge in 1953

Attack Squadron 54 (VA-54) was an attack squadron of the United States Navy. Originally established as Bomber Fighter Squadron VBF-153 on 26 March 1945, redesignated Fighter Squadron VF-61A (VF-16A) on 15 November 1946, redesignated VF-152 on 15 July 1948, and VF-54 on 15 February 1950. It was finally redesignated VA-54 on 15 June 1956. The squadron was disestablished on 1 April 1958. It was the second squadron to be designated VA-54, the first VA-54 was disestablished on 1 December 1949.

The squadron's insignia changed several times over its lifetime, ending up as a devil's head with naval aviation wings. Its nickname was the Copperheads until 1951, and Hell's Angels thereafter.

== Operational history ==
- 29 June 1950: VF-54 was deployed aboard USS Valley Forge in the Western Pacific when the Korean War broke out on 25 June. The carrier was ordered north from the Philippines and the squadron's aircraft conducted a sweep along the western coast of Taiwan due to the concern that the North Korean invasion of South Korea might be a prelude to an invasion of that island by the Chinese Communists.
- 3 July 1950: The squadron participated in its first combat strikes since its establishment in 1945. These strikes were the first made by carrier aircraft in the Korean War. VF-54's F4Us struck targets in Pyongyang, North Korea.
- 15 September 1950: VF-54 provided air support for the Battle of Inchon.
- 26 July 1954: VF-54's AD-4 Skyraiders were on a search and rescue mission looking for survivors, rafts or debris from the 1954 Cathay Pacific Douglas DC-4 shootdown, when they were attacked by two Chinese LA-7 fighter aircraft. Two of the squadron's AD-4s, along with an F4U, shot down the two LA-7s 13 miles southeast of Hainan Island.
- September 1957: USS Bon Homme Richard, with VA-54 embarked, operated in the vicinity of Taiwan in response to a buildup of Chinese Communist forces on the mainland opposite Taiwan.
- Dec 1957: The squadron began the transition from propeller aircraft to jets.

== Home port assignments ==
The squadron was assigned to these home ports, effective on the dates shown:

- NAS Wildwood – 26 Mar 1945
- NAAS Oceana – 1 Jun 1945
- NAS Norfolk – 2 Jul 1946
- NAS Alameda – 11 Aug 1946
- NAS Sand Point – 4 May 1948
- NAS Alameda – 28 Jun 1948
- NAS San Diego – 1 Dec 1949
- NAS Miramar – 19 May 1952

== Aircraft assignment ==
The squadron first received the following aircraft on the dates shown:

- F4U-1 Corsair – 26 Mar 1945
- F4U-4 Corsair – 4 Jun 1945
- F6F-5 Hellcat – 10 Sep 1945
- F8F-1 Bearcat – 21 Oct 1947
- F8F-2 Bearcat – May 1949
- AD-4 Skyraider – 1 Dec 1949
- F4U-4B Corsair – 14 Dec 1949
- AD-1/4 Skyraider – Mar 1951
- AD-6 Skyraider – Dec 1954
- AD-5 Skyraider – Dec 1954
- AD-7 Skyraider – Jan 1957
- F9F-8B Cougar – Dec 1957

== See also ==
- Attack aircraft
- History of the United States Navy
- List of inactive United States Navy aircraft squadrons
