= Forrest Sherman =

United States Navy admiral

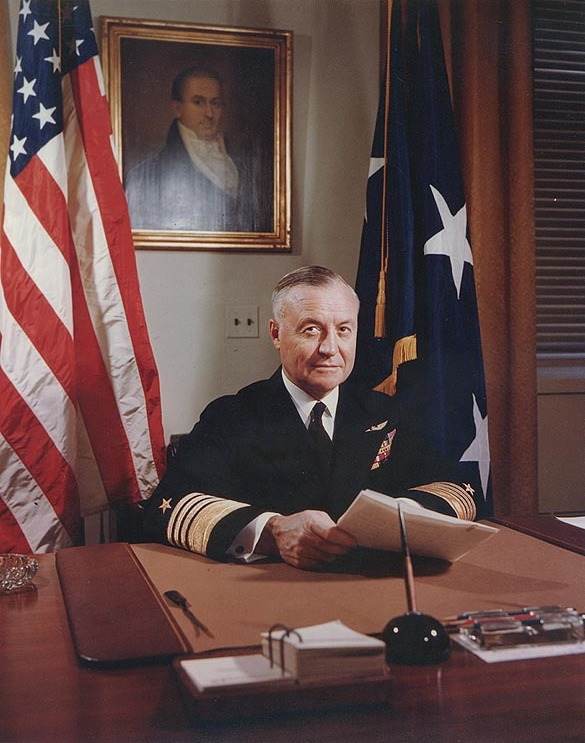
- Born: Forrest Percival Sherman; October 30, 1896; Merrimack, New Hampshire, U.S.
- Died: July 22, 1951 (aged 54); Naples, Italy
- Burial place: Arlington National Cemetery
- Military career
- Branch: United States Navy
- Service years: 1917–1951
- Rank: Admiral
- Commands: Chief of Naval Operations; United States Sixth Fleet; USS Wasp; Fighter Squadron VF-1B; Scouting Squadron VS-2B; USS Barry
- Conflicts: World War I; World War II; Solomon Islands campaign; Guadalcanal campaign; Battle of the Eastern Solomons
- Awards: Navy Cross; Navy Distinguished Service Medal; Legion of Merit; Purple Heart

Forrest Percival Sherman (October 30, 1896 – July 22, 1951) was an admiral in the United States Navy and the youngest person to serve as Chief of Naval Operations until Admiral Elmo Zumwalt in 1970. The Forrest Sherman-class destroyer and the airfield at Naval Air Station Pensacola (Forrest Sherman Field) were named for him.

== Early life and education ==
Born in Merrimack, New Hampshire, Sherman was a member of the United States Naval Academy class of 1918, graduating in June 1917 due to America's entry into World War I.

== Naval career ==
During and shortly after World War I, Sherman served in European waters as an officer of the gunboat USS Nashville and destroyer USS Murray. In 1919–21, Sherman was assigned to the battleship USS Utah and destroyers USS Reid and USS Barry, serving as commanding officer of the latter.

Following duty as Flag Lieutenant to Commander Control Force, Atlantic Fleet, he received flight training at Naval Air Station Pensacola, Florida. Designated a Naval Aviator in December 1922, Lieutenant Sherman was assigned to Fighter Squadron VF-2B until 1924, when he returned to Pensacola as an instructor. Study at the Naval War College was followed in 1927 by service in the aircraft carriers USS Lexington and USS Saratoga. While in the latter ship, he commanded Scouting Squadron VS-2B and was Flag Secretary to Commander Aircraft Squadrons, Battle Fleet.

Promoted to the ranks of lieutenant commander in 1930 and commander in 1937, during that decade Sherman served at the Naval Academy, commanded Fighter Squadron VF-1B, had charge of the Aviation Ordnance Section of the Bureau of Ordnance, was Navigator of the aircraft carrier USS Ranger, and had duty on a number of flag staffs. In 1941–42, he served with the Office of the Chief of Naval Operations and was a member of the Permanent Joint Board on Defense, Canada-United States.

Commander Sherman worked closely with then US Army Major Albert C. Wedemeyer, author of the "Victory Plan of 1941", "the blueprint... for the mobilization of the United States Army for World War 2". Wedemeyer, while working in the War Plans Department, was commissioned to write the "Victory Plan by General George C. Marshall."

The Victory Plan predicted the future organization for an army that did not yet exist, outlined combat missions for a war not yet declared, and computed war production requirements for industries that were still committed to peacetime manufacture." Captain Forrest Sherman's personal relationship with Major Albert Wedemeyer "ensured a community of planning effort between the two services and pointed to a future in which the services would acknowledge that mobilization planning was a joint responsibility that one service alone could not conduct adequately.

— Charles E. Kirkpatrick, Writing the Victory Plan of 1941

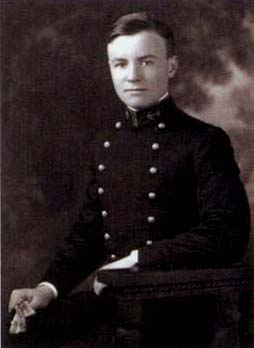
Midshipman Forrest Sherman

In May 1942, after reaching the rank of captain, Sherman took command of the carrier USS Wasp, taking the ship through the first month of the Solomon Islands campaign.

After Wasp was sunk by a Japanese submarine on September 15, 1942, Sherman was awarded the Navy Cross for his extraordinary heroism in command of the carrier during the opening days of the South Pacific operations. Sherman then became Chief of Staff to Commander Air Force, Pacific Fleet. In November 1943, Rear Admiral Sherman was assigned as Deputy Chief of Staff to the Pacific Fleet commander, Admiral Chester W. Nimitz. He held that position for the remainder of World War II, playing a critical role in planning the offensives that brought victory in the Pacific, and was present when Japan surrendered on September 2, 1945. Following a short tour as a carrier division commander, in December 1945 Vice Admiral Sherman became Deputy Chief of Naval Operations. During 1946 and 1947 he had a vital role in the negotiations for the unification process leading to the National Security Act of 1947.

Sherman's next assignment, beginning in January 1948, was to command the navy's operating forces in the Mediterranean Sea. He was recalled to Washington, D.C., at the end of October 1949 to become Chief of Naval Operations, with the rank of admiral. During the next sixteen months, he helped the navy recover from a period of intense political controversy (as in the so-called "Revolt of the Admirals"). Sherman's absence from the recent controversy, and his role in the unification negotiations made him the logical candidate. As Chief of Naval Operations, he oversaw the responses to the twin challenges of a hot war in Korea and an intensifying cold war elsewhere in the world.

On July 22, 1951, while on a military and diplomatic trip to Europe, Admiral Forrest Sherman died in Naples, Italy, following a sudden series of heart attacks. He was buried at Arlington National Cemetery on July 27, 1951.

== Legacy ==
USS Forrest Sherman (DD-931), lead ship of the Forrest Sherman-class destroyers was named in his honor, followed by USS Forrest Sherman (DDG-98), an Arleigh Burke-class guided missile destroyer.

Also named in his honor was Sherman Island, Antarctica; Forrest Sherman Field at NAS Pensacola, home of the Blue Angels; and Forrest Sherman Field at Hospital Point at the US Naval Academy. The US Department of Defense school in Naples, Italy was formerly called Forrest Sherman High School.

== Decorations and medals ==
Admiral Sherman's decorations include:

Naval Aviator Badge
Navy Cross	Navy Distinguished Service Medal	Legion of Merit
Purple Heart (award for wounds received aboard the USS Wasp)	Victory Medal with "Patrol" Clasp	American Defense Service Medal with "Fleet" clasp
American Campaign Medal	Asiatic-Pacific Campaign Medal with three battle stars	World War II Victory Medal
Navy Occupation Service Medal	National Defense Service Medal	Philippine Liberation Medal with one battle star

Military offices
Preceded by Louis E. Denfeld	Chief of Naval Operations; 1949–1951	Succeeded by William Fechteler
