= ARA Suboficial Castillo =

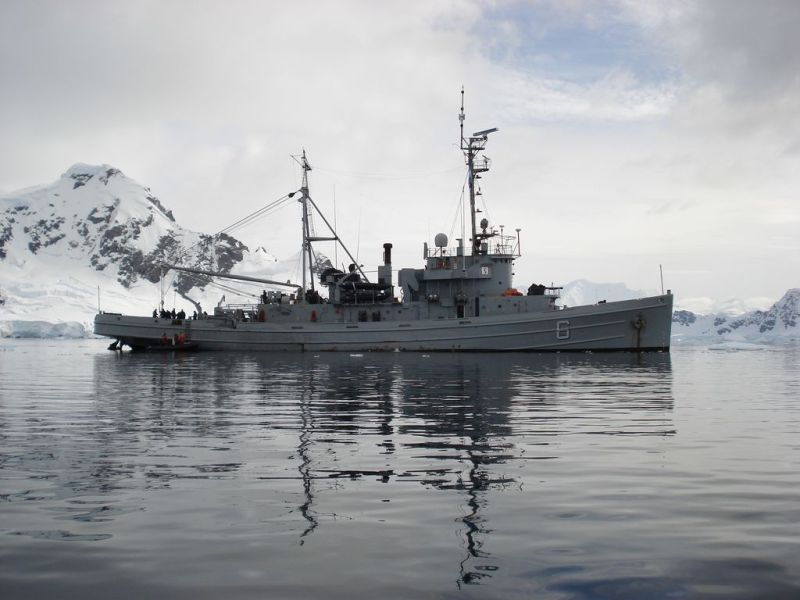
- ARA Suboficial Castillo in Antarctic waters

History

United States
- Name: Takelma
- Namesake: The Takelma people
- Builder: United Engineering Co.
- Laid down: 7 April 1943
- Launched: 18 September 1943
- Commissioned: 3 August 1944
- Stricken: 28 January 1992
- Motto: "We Can Hack It !"
- Honours and awards: 2 Battle Stars Korean War; 2 Campaign Stars Vietnam War
- Fate: Transferred to Argentine Navy, 1993

Argentina
- Name: Suboficial Castillo
- Namesake: Marine Julio Saturnino Castillo
- Acquired: 30 September 1993
- Commissioned: 7 June 1994
- Decommissioned: 2020

General characteristics
- Displacement: 1,675 long tons (1,702 t) (full)
- Length: 205 ft (62 m)
- Beam: 38.5 ft (11.7 m)
- Draft: 15.33 ft (4.67 m)
- Propulsion: Diesel-electric, single screw, 3,600 shp (2,700 kW)
- Speed: 16.5 knots (30.6 km/h; 19.0 mph)
- Complement: 85
- Armament: 1 × 3 in (76 mm) dual-purpose gun; 2 × twin 40 mm anti-aircraft (AA) guns; 2 × single 20 mm AA guns

ARA Suboficial Castillo (A-6) was an Abnaki-class tug/patrol boat of the Argentine Navy. She previously served in the United States Navy as USS Takelma (ATF-113) from 1944 to 1992. The ship was acquired by Argentina in 1993 and was in service until the 2020s. In 2022, the ship was put up for sale. Suboficial Castillo was used as a support ship for both the Argentine Submarine Force and during the summer campaigns in Antarctica in the Patrulla Antártica Naval Combinada (English: Joint Antarctic Naval Patrol) with the Chilean Navy to guarantee safety to all touristic and scientific ships that are in transit within the Antarctic Peninsula.

== Service history ==
=== US Navy service ===
Takelma was laid down on 7 April 1943 by the United Engineering Co. at their yard in Alameda, California. The ship was launched on 18 September 1943 and commissioned on 3 August 1944. The vessel was named after the Native American Takelma people from Oregon. Takelma arrived at Pearl Harbor on 5 January 1945 and was routed westward to Eniwetok. The fleet ocean tug towed vessels between various Pacific bases such as Ulithi, Leyte, Hollandia, Subic Bay, Manus, Espiritu Santo, and Milne Bay until she returned to Pearl Harbor in June 1946.

From 1946 to 1952 Takelma operated out of numerous locations including San Diego, Pearl Harbor, Adak, and Subic Bay at various times. She cruised over much of the Pacific Ocean with port calls at locations such as Midway, Balboa, Coco Solo, Wake, Kwajalein, Japan, and Korea. One of Takelma's more noteworthy missions was supporting Operation Crossroads, the atomic bomb tests at Bikini Atoll. In February 1947 she was ordered to begin towing target ships from various ports to the Marshall Islands. In December 1947 she began to tow surviving target ships from the Bikini Atoll following the tests. Among the ships she towed were the battleship New York and the cruisers Salt Lake City and Pensacola.

==== Korean and Vietnam wars ====
Takelma operated out of Sasebo and Yokosuka, Japan during the Korean War. The tug operated in Korean waters from 20 August to 17 September 1952, serving at Sokcho, Pusan, and Wonsan, before returning to Sasebo. From 2 to 30 December she again sailed to the Korean ports of Cho Do and Yongyong Do. Takelma left Sasebo in January 1953 to return to the combat zone. She remained there from 19 to 24 January. Her last service during the Korean War began when she arrived at Wonsan on 30 January. She departed for Sasebo on 18 February 1953. From 1954 to mid-1968, the ship operated from her home port at Pearl Harbor or on deployments to the Far East.

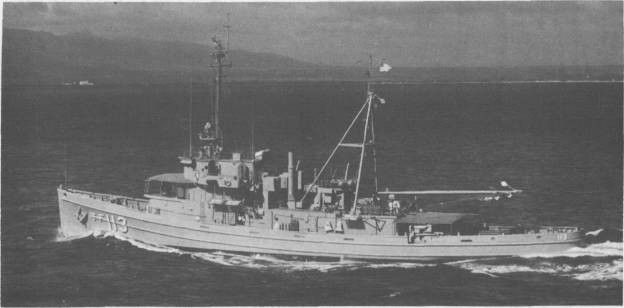
The fleet tug Takelma off Oahu early in 1967

During American combat operations in the Vietnam War, Takelma was at "Yankee Station" in the Gulf of Tonkin from 8 July to 15 August 1968 performing special operations for the United States 7th Fleet, and she returned to that task again from 18 October until 12 November 1968 when she sailed for Hawaii. Takelma received two battle stars for Korean service and two campaign stars for service in Vietnam. Takelma operated from Pearl Harbor until October 1976 when her home port was shifted to San Diego. On 1 June 1979, Takelma commenced service as a naval reserve training ship.

==== End of US service ====
The ship was decommissioned and struck from the Naval Register on 28 January 1992. The vessel was transferred to Argentina on 30 September 1993, under the Security Assistance Program and renamed ARA Suboficial Castillo (A-6).

=== Argentine service ===
The ship was acquired in 1993 by the Argentine Navy and classified as aviso. It is the first ship to bear the name of Argentine Marines's Sub-Officer Julio Saturnino Castillo, an Argentine Nation to the Heroic Valour in Combat Cross recipient killed during the Falklands War (Spanish: Guerra de las Malvinas).

On 25 May 1995 Suboficial Castillo captured the trawler LW9579 for illegal fishing in the Argentine Sea.

In January 1998, she transported a French team to the Isla de los Estados which installed a replica of Jules Verne's The Lighthouse at the End of the World. On 19 August 1998 after finishing a naval exercise with the Chilean Navy and the vessel docked at the port of Ushuaia. While in port, ARA Comodoro Somellera sank following a collision with her during a storm.

In 2007 she participated on the rescue of ARA Almirante Irizar after the icebreaker caught fire.

As of 2010 she was homebased at Mar del Plata naval base. In 2016, Suboficial Castillo was among the vessels ordered to search for survivors after the coastal vessel San Antonio sank off Mar del Plata. In 2020, the ship was taken out of service. In 2022, it was indicated that the decommissioned Suboficial Castillo would be auctioned off.
