= VA-54 (U.S. Navy) =

Attack Squadron 54
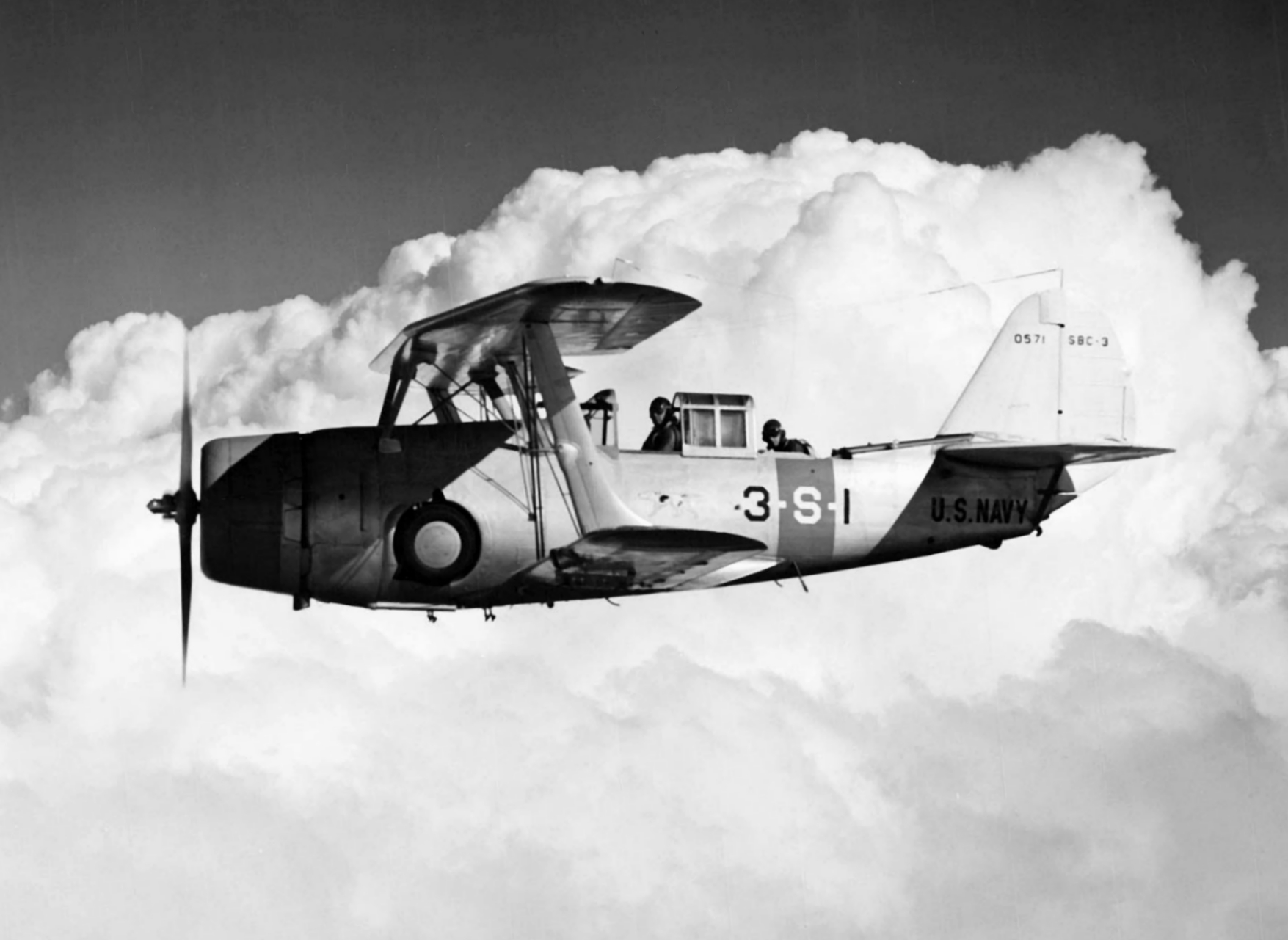
- VS-3 SBC-3 Helldiver in 1939
- Active: 3 July 1928 – 1 December 1949
- Country: United States
- Branch: United States Navy
- Type: Attack
- Engagements: World War II

Aircraft flown
- Attack: Vought UO; Vought FU-1; Vought O2U Corsair; Vought SBU-1 Corsair; Curtiss SBC-3/4 Helldiver; Douglas SBD-3/4/5 Dauntless; Curtiss SB2C Helldiver; Vought F4U-4 Corsair; Douglas AD-1/4 Skyraider

VA-54 was an early and long-lived Attack Squadron of the U.S. Navy, operating under many designations during its 20-year life. It was established as Scouting Squadron VS-2B on 3 July 1928, and redesignated as VS-3 on 1 July 1937, and as Bombing Squadron VB-4 on 1 March 1943. It was redesignated as VB-5 on 15 July of that same year, and as Attack Squadron VA-5A on 15 November 1946. Finally, it was redesignated as VA-54 on 15 November 1946. VA-54 was disestablished on 1 December 1949. The squadron's insignia varied over its lifetime, depicting in turn a bird dog, a devil, and finally a bomb and five playing cards. Its nickname is unknown. It was the first squadron to be designated VA-54, a second VA-54 was redesignated from VF-54 on 15 June 1956 and disestablished on 1 April 1958.

== Notable personnel ==
The squadron's acting commanding officer when it was established in 1928, and again for three months in 1929, was LT Forrest Sherman, who became the nation's youngest Chief of Naval Operations in 1949.

== Operational history ==
- January–February 1929: Fleet Problem IX was the first time the Navy's two large carriers, USS Saratoga (with VS-2B embarked) and USS Lexington, participated in a major fleet exercise.
- March–April 1930: In March, Fleet Problem X was conducted in the Caribbean Sea, followed by Fleet Problem XI in April.
- May 1930: VS-2B's aircraft joined with the planes from nine other squadrons, which included Saratoga, Lexington and USS Langley Air Groups, for a three-day tour of east coast cities from Norfolk, Virginia to Boston. The flight was commanded by Captain Kenneth Whiting and consisted of 36 torpedo and bombing planes, 57 fighting planes, 24 scouting planes, 3 amphibian utility planes, 3 Ford tri-motor transports and 2 staff planes. It was the largest air parade that had ever been assembled on the East Coast.
- 5 November 1931: The squadron's commanding officer, Lieutenant Commander Oscar W. Erickson, was killed in an airplane crash at sea.
- 1931–1934: The squadron participated in Fleet Problems XII through XV
- 31 May 1934: A Naval Review for President Franklin D. Roosevelt was held in New York Harbor.
- 1935–1938: The squadron participated in Fleet Problems XVI through XIX.
- April–May 1940: The squadron participated in Fleet Problem XXI. This was the last major fleet problem conducted before the attack on Pearl Harbor and America's involvement in World War II.
- August 1942: VS-3 and the other squadrons in Saratoga's Air Group provided air support for the battle of Guadalcanal.
- 24–25 August 1942: VS-3 participated in the Battle of the Eastern Solomons and, along with other squadrons in the Saratoga Air Group, attacked and sunk the Japanese carrier Ryujo. En route back to Saratoga after their attack on the Ryujo, Lieutenant Commander Kirn, and ten of his SBDs attacked a Japanese flight of four Vals, downing three and damaging the fourth.
- September–November 1942: VS-3 operated from Espiritu Santo, New Hebrides until its return to CONUS in December.
- 6–24 July 1943: VB-5 departed Norfolk embarked on USS Yorktown en route to the Hawaiian Islands via the Panama Canal.
- 31 August 1943: VB-5, embarked on Yorktown, participated in a raid on Marcus Island.
- 5–6 October 1943: The squadron participated in a raid on Wake Island.
- November–December 1943: VB-5 participated in the Gilbert and Marshall Islands campaign in support of the landings on Makin and Tarawa, as well as strikes against the Marshalls.
- January–February 1944: The squadron flew strikes against the Marshall Islands and provided air support for the invasion of the Marshalls.
- 16–17 February 1944: VB-5, along with other squadrons in Air Group 5, flew strikes against the Japanese stronghold of Truk.
- 22 February 1944: CVG-5's aircraft, including VB-5, raided the Marianas striking targets on Saipan.
- 30 March–1 April 1944: VB-5's SBDs struck ships and facilities at Palau in the Caroline Islands.
- 21–23 April 1944: Strikes were flown by VB-5 against targets on Wade Island and Hollandia in New Guinea. These operations were in support of Operations Reckless and Persecution.
- 29–30 April 1944: VB-5 conducted another strike operation against Truk.
- 14 May 1944: Following a ten-month combat tour, which began in August 1943, Air Group 5 was relieved aboard Yorktown by Air Group 1 and the Air Group, including VB-5, returned to CONUS.
- 7 February 1945: CVG-5, with VB-5, embarked on USS Franklin and departed NAS Alameda for Hawaii, arriving there on 13 February. This was the beginning of the squadron's third major combat tour in the Pacific.
- 19 March 1945: Following the launch of CVG-5 aircraft, including Curtiss SB2C Helldivers from VB-5, for an attack against the city of Kobe, Japan, Franklin was hit by two enemy bombs from a Japanese aircraft. Fires were ignited on the second and third decks from the first bomb and the second triggered munitions on the carrier. All CVG-5's aircraft still on the carrier were destroyed. The damage was one of the most extensive experienced by an Essex-class aircraft carrier during World War II. A total of 724 were killed and 265 wounded. However, the crew's heroic efforts saved the ship. CVG-5 personnel were transferred to USS Santa Fe. CVG-5 aircraft in the air landed on other carriers, primarily USS Bennington. Personnel in the water were picked up by destroyers.
- May 1949: VA-54 was the last fleet squadron to operate the Curtiss SB2C Helldiver aircraft. The squadron completed its Operational Readiness Inspection on 19 May and the last operational flight of the SB2C Helldiver.

== Home port assignments ==
The squadron was assigned to these home ports, effective on the dates shown:

- Naval Air Station San Diego – 3 July 1928
- Espiritu Santo, New Hebrides – September 1942*
- Naval Air Station San Diego – December 1942
- Marine Corps Air Station El Centro – January 1943
- Naval Air Station San Diego – March 1943
- Naval Air Station Norfolk – April 1943
- Naval Station Pearl Harbor – July 1943*
- Naval Air Station Barbers Point – September 1943*
- Naval Air Station Puʻunene – October 1943*
- Naval Air Station Hilo – December 1943*
- Naval Air Station Kaneohe Bay – December 1943*
- Naval Air Station Alameda – 25 June 1944
- Naval Auxiliary Air Station Fallon – 25 July 1944
- Naval Auxiliary Air Station Vernalis – 29 October 1944
- Naval Auxiliary Air Station Santa Rosa – 10 November 1944
- Hawaii - February 1945*
- Naval Air Station Klamath Falls – 8 May 1945
- Naval Air Station Pasco – 28 Sep 1945
- Naval Auxiliary Air Station Brown Field – 3 December 1945
- Naval Air Station Barbers Point – 25 March 1946
- Naval Air Station San Diego – 20 May 1946
- Naval Air Station Seattle – 13 January 1947
- Naval Air Station San Diego – 20 March 1947

• Temporary shore assignment during World War II.

== Aircraft assignment ==
The squadron first received the following aircraft in the months shown:

- Vought UO – July 1928
- Vought FU-1 – 27 August 1928
- Vought O2U-1 & -2 Corsair – December 1928
- Vought O3U-2 Corsair – December 1931
- Vought SU-1 Corsair – May 1932
- Vought SU-3 Corsair – November 1932
- Vought SU-2 Corsair – December 1932
- Vought SBU-1 Corsair (scout bomber) – January 1936
- Curtiss SBC-3 Helldiver (biplane) – August 1937
- Curtiss SBC-4 Helldiver – March 1941
- Douglas SBD-3 Dauntless – August 1941
- Douglas SBD-4 Dauntless – January 1943
- Curtiss SB2C Helldiver (monoplane) – April 1943
- Douglas SBD-5 Dauntless – June 1943
- Curtiss SB2C-3 Helldiver – 25 June 1944
- Curtiss SBW-3 Helldiver – 25 June 1944
- Curtiss SB2C-4 Helldiver – September 1944
- Curtiss SB2C-4E Helldiver – December 1944
- Curtiss SB2C-5 Helldiver – March 1946
- Vought F4U-4 Corsair (fighter) – 19 April 1948
- Douglas AD-1 Skyraider – May 1949
- Douglas AD-4 Skyraider – October 1949

== See also ==
- Attack aircraft
- List of inactive United States Navy aircraft squadrons
- History of the United States Navy
