= USS Donner =

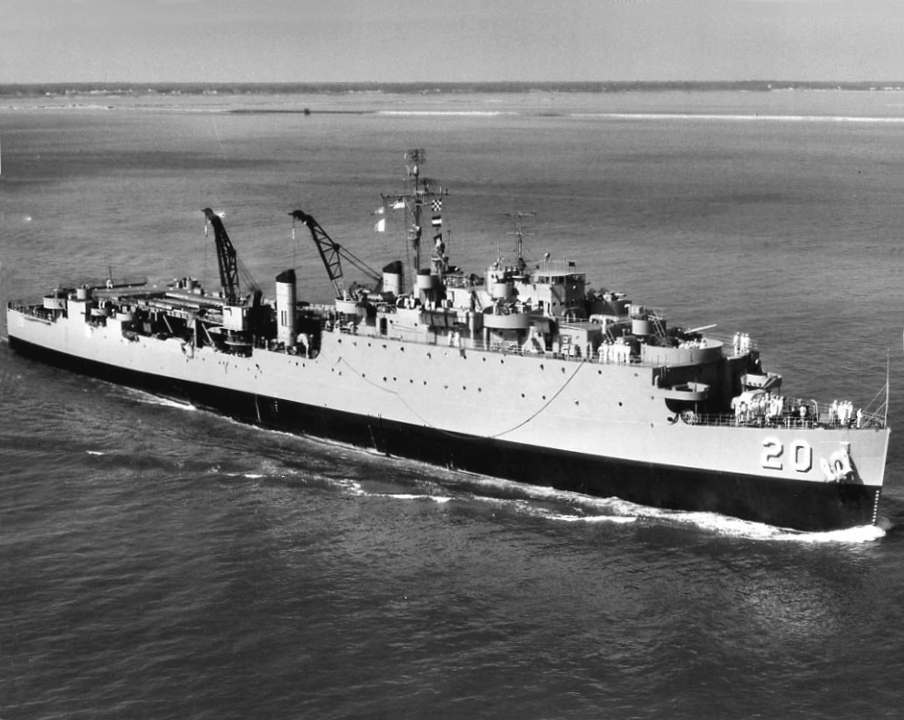
- USS Donner underway circa the mid-1950s

History

United States
- Name: USS Donner
- Namesake: Donner Pass through Sierra Nevada Mountains in California
- Awarded: 1 July 1944
- Laid down: 1 December 1944
- Launched: 6 April 1945
- Commissioned: 31 July 1945
- Decommissioned: 23 December 1970
- Stricken: 1 November 1976
- Fate: March 2005, scrapped at All Star Metals, Brownsville, TX

General characteristics
- Displacement: 7,930 tons (loaded), 4,032 tons (light draft)
- Length: 457 ft 9 in (139.5 m) overall
- Beam: 72 ft 2 in (22.0 m)
- Draft: 8 ft 2½ in (2.5 m) fwd, 10 ft ½ in (3.1 m) aft (light); 15 ft 5½ in (4.7 m) fwd, 16 ft 2 in (4.9 m) aft (loaded)
- Propulsion: 2 Babcock & Wilcox boilers, 2 Steam turbine Engines, 2 propeller shafts – each shaft 3,700 hp, at 240 rpm total shaft horse power 7,400, 2 11 ft 9 in diameter, 9 ft 9 in pitch propellers
- Speed: 17 knots (31 km/h)
- Range: 8,000 nmi. at 15 knots; (15,000 km at 28 km/h)
- Boats & landing craft carried: 3 × LCT (Mk V or VI); each w/ 5 medium tanks or; 2 × LCT (Mk III or IV); each w/ 12 medium tanks or; 14 × LCM (Mk III); each w/ 1 medium tank; or 1,500 long tons cargo or; 47 × DUKW or; 41 × LVT or; Any combination of landing vehicles and landing craft up to capacity
- Capacity: 22 officers, 218 men
- Complement: 17 officers, 237 men (ship); 6 officers, 30 men (landing craft)
- Armament: 1 × 5 in / 38 cal. DP gun; 2 × 40 mm quad AA guns; 2 × 40 mm twin AA guns; 16 × 20 mm AA guns
- Aircraft carried: modified to accommodate helicopters on an added portable deck
- Notes: By 1959, there were only 2 twin mount and 2 quadmount 40mm's

USS Donner (LSD-20) was a Casa Grande-class dock landing ship of the United States Navy, named for the Sierra Nevada Donner Pass, where the Donner Party became snowbound in the winter of 1846–47.

Donner was launched on 6 April 1945 by the Boston Navy Yard, sponsored by Mrs. W. V. Alexander Jr.; and commissioned on 31 July 1945.

== 1945 – 1960 ==
Donner transported landing craft from Norfolk to New York, then operated boat pools along the east coast until 3 November 1946 when she sailed for the Mediterranean and similar duty. She returned to Norfolk on 24 December for duty along the coast and on voyages to NS Argentia, and Labrador. From 31 January to 10 March 1948 she sailed in the Caribbean for a large scale landing exercise by the 2nd Fleet. The Donner was placed out of commission in reserve 12 August 1949.

Recommissioned 15 September 1950 after the outbreak of the Korean War, Donner cruised to the Mediterranean for duty with the 6th Fleet between 5 March and 6 July 1951. Operating from Norfolk she took part in training exercises in the Caribbean and made several cruises to the waters off Greenland for replenishment and cold weather operations. From 17 July to 7 October 1956, she made two voyages from Norfolk to resupply the DEW Line stations.

Donner participated in the International Naval Review at Hampton Roads on 12 June 1957, then sailed for the Mediterranean on 28 August for NATO landing exercises in Turkey. She returned to Norfolk on 8 February 1958 and resumed training operations there and in the Caribbean. Donner prepared for deployment to the Mediterranean during the Lebanon landings, but her orders were canceled when the crisis eased.

During the summer of 1959, Donner took part in Operation Inland Seas, the historic first passage of a Navy task force into the Great Lakes through the newly dedicated Saint Lawrence Seaway. Between 7 January 1960 and 14 June, she again served in the Mediterranean with the 6th Fleet. On 18 June 1960, she entered Norfolk Naval Shipyard for overhaul and modernization which continued through December 1960.

== 1961 – 1970 ==
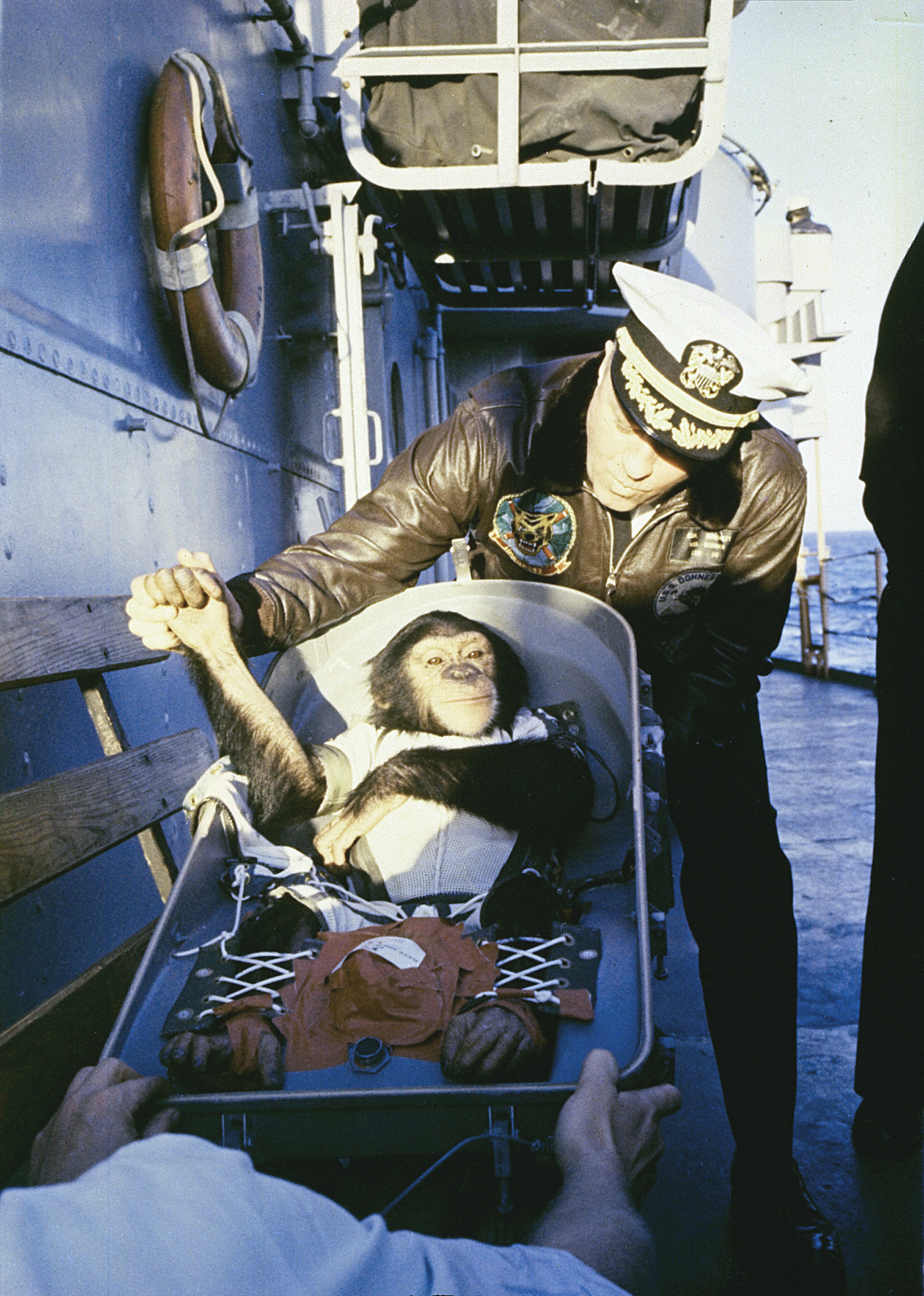
Ham is greeted by Donner's commander, CDR Ralph A. Brackett, after his 16-minute 39-seconds suborbital flight.

On 31 January 1961, the Donner recovered the Mercury-Redstone 2 spacecraft. The Mercury capsule was retrieved by helicopter and lowered to the deck. When the spacecraft was opened the chimpanzee astronaut Ham appeared to be in good condition and readily accepted an apple and half an orange.

From 17 September to 19 December 1961, Donner served as flagship for Admiral Allan L. Reed, commander of the South Atlantic fleet, during Solant Amity III, a good-will tour to Cape Town and Port Elizabeth, South Africa and other ports along the African West Coast.

Donner was decommissioned on 23 December 1970, and struck from the Naval Vessel Register on 1 November 1976. She was laid up in the National Defense Reserve Fleet, James River, Reserve Fleet, at Fort Eustis, Va., from October 1981 until November 2005, when she was removed for scrapping by All Star Metals of Brownsville, Texas.
