= USS John W. Weeks =

Allen M. Sumner-class destroyer

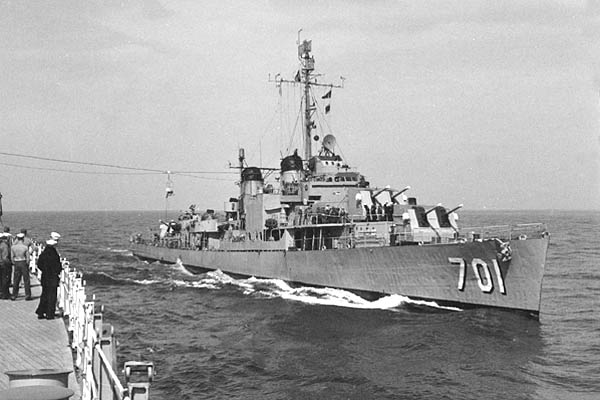
- USS John W. Weeks performing a highline transfer

History

United States
- Name: John W. Weeks
- Namesake: John Wingate Weeks
- Builder: Federal Shipbuilding and Drydock Company
- Laid down: 17 January 1944
- Launched: 21 May 1944
- Commissioned: 21 July 1944
- Decommissioned: 12 August 1970
- Stricken: 12 August 1970
- Fate: Sunk as target off Virginia 19 November 1970

General characteristics
- Class & type: Allen M. Sumner-class destroyer
- Displacement: 2,200 tons
- Length: 376 ft 6 in (114.76 m)
- Beam: 40 ft (12 m)
- Draft: 15 ft 8 in (4.78 m)
- Propulsion: 60,000 shp (45,000 kW); 2 propellers
- Speed: 34 kn (63 km/h; 39 mph)
- Range: 6,500 nmi (12,000 km; 7,500 mi) at 15 kn (28 km/h; 17 mph)
- Complement: 336
- Armament: 6 × 5 in (130 mm)/38 cal guns, 12 × 40 mm AA guns, 11 × 20 mm AA guns, 10 × 21 inch (533 mm) torpedo tubes, 6 × depth charge projectors, 2 × depth charge tracks

USS John W. Weeks (DD-701), an Allen M. Sumner-class destroyer, was named for John Wingate Weeks, who attained the rank of rear admiral. Weeks was elected to the United States House of Representatives where he served until entering the United States Senate in 1913. He became Secretary of War on 4 March 1921.

John W. Weeks was laid down on 17 January 1944 by Federal Ship Building & Dry Dock Co., Kearny, New Jersey. The ship was launched on 21 May 1944; sponsored by Mrs. John W. Davidge, daughter of Secretary Weeks. The ship was commissioned on 21 July 1944.

== Service history ==
=== 1940s ===
After shakedown out of Bermuda and tests en route to Argentina, the new destroyer departed New York on 10 November 1944, escorting the battleships Missouri, Texas, Arkansas and aircraft carriers Shamrock Bay and Wake Island to the Pacific. She transited the Panama Canal and touched San Francisco, Pearl Harbor, and Eniwetok before joining the 3rd Fleet at Ulithi 27 December.

Early in January 1945, John W. Weeks sortied from that busy lagoon with Vice Admiral John S. McCain's Fast Carrier Task Force TF 38 and headed toward the Philippines in the screen of Rear Admiral Gerald F. Bogan's task group. Meanwhile, the mighty Luzon Attack Force assembled in Leyte Gulf on New Year's Day, passed through Surigao Strait, and set course for Lingayen Gulf. On 9 January, as General Douglas MacArthur's troops landed on the beaches at Lingayen, planes from McCain's carriers hit Japanese airstrips on Formosa and the Pescadores to neutralize air opposition to the Luzon invasion. That night McCain's ships slipped through Luzon Strait into the South China Sea where they could be on call to support the Allied beachheads while striking strategic enemy positions along the southeastern coast of Asia and searching for the Imperial Fleet. In the next 10 days, they lashed out at Hong Kong, Hainan, and the Indochinese coast causing much damage ashore and sinking 44 ships totaling 132,700 tons. At the end of this sweep into enemy waters Admiral William Halsey reported, "the outer defenses of the Japanese Empire no longer include Burma and the Netherlands East Indies; those countries are now isolated outposts, and their products are no longer available to the Japanese war machine..." John W. Weeks returned with her carriers to Ulithi on 28 January.

The destroyer again sailed with the carriers on 11 February, and conducted strikes on Tokyo on 16–17 February, in preinvasion support of the Allied attack on Iwo Jima. After inflicting considerable damage to Japanese air power, John W. Weeks steamed toward Iwo Jima to give direct support to Marines fighting for the island. Later that month, the carriers renewed their attacks on the enemy's home islands. Heavy raids during March continued to cripple the enemy's power, and the destroyer received credit for two assists as five enemy planes were splashed while attempting a raid on the Task Force.

When D-day for the Okinawa invasion neared, Weeks in company with other units shelled the shores in preinvasion bombardment. The assault forces landed on 1 April, and the destroyer stood by to offer support. On 7 April, a Japanese surface force was located, and strikes were launched to intercept the enemy, resulting in the sinking of Yamato. During these operations, the aircraft carrier Hancock was hit by a kamikaze and the destroyer rescued 23 survivors in a heroic rescue mission.

For the remainder of the war, John W. Weeks participated in the final assault on the Empire Islands, engaging in radar picket duty, shore bombardment, rescue missions and the antishipping sweep off Tokyo Bay. Following the cessation of hostilities, she steamed into Tokyo Bay on 8 September to begin escort operations with the occupation forces. She continued escort duty until 30 December, when she sailed for home, arriving San Francisco on 20 January 1946. The destroyer arrived Norfolk, Virginia on 19 February and following repairs she was inactivated on 26 April.

One year later, on 17 May 1947, she sailed once again and commenced Naval Reserve training cruises until mid-1949. On 6 September of that year, she sailed for Europe, returning on 8 February 1950. John W. Weeks decommissioned on 31 May 1950.

=== 1950s ===
At the beginning of the Korean War, President Harry S. Truman ordered American forces into action to take up the challenge. John W. Weeks recommissioned on 24 October 1950 and commenced training cruises in the Atlantic and Caribbean. During her European cruise in January 1952, she participated in the attempt to save ill-fated Flying Enterprise, which foundered and sank in a 90-mile (140 km) gale on 10 January 1952. The destroyer returned to Norfolk on 6 February to engage in coastal operations and a midshipmen European cruise.

John W. Weeks sailed on an around the world cruise on 3 November 1953, and while in the Far East she operated with units of the 7th Fleet off the coast of Korea. She completed the cruise when she returned via the Mediterranean arriving Norfolk on 4 June 1954. From 1954 to 1963 the destroyer operated with the Atlantic Fleet and during this period made five Mediterranean cruises and two NATO exercises.

The destroyer was operating with the 6th Fleet during 1956 when the Suez Crisis erupted over the canal. One year later, on another Near Eastern deployment, Weeks and other units stood by to prevent subversion of Jordan. The Mediterranean cruise of 1958 included patrol duty and exercises with navies of Baghdad Pact countries. The destroyer was also active in U.S. waters, busy with midshipmen at-sea training and antisubmarine exercises. During 1959 she participated in Operation "Inland Seas" during the opening of the St. Lawrence Seaway. John W. Weeks was the first navy destroyer to enter each of the Great Lakes. During this cruise she escorted the royal yacht HMY Britannia, with Queen Elizabeth II of the United Kingdom aboard, from Chicago to Sault Ste. Marie, Michigan.

=== 1960s ===
On 9 March 1960, John W. Weeks, in company with the destroyer Ault, transited the Bosporus; and the two became the first U.S. warships to enter the Black Sea since 1945. On the same cruise she rendezvoused with Triton at the end of the nuclear-powered submarine's cruise round the world.

After returning to Norfolk, the destroyer visited the Caribbean and the New England coast on midshipman training at sea. In the fall she deployed to the Mediterranean and returned to Norfolk, Virginia on 3 March 1962. Midshipman training in the summer and exercise out of Norfolk kept the ship in fighting trim and ready for action.

In October, the presence of Soviet offensive missiles in Cuba prompted President John F. Kennedy to order a quarantine of the island (See Cuban Missile Crisis). John W. Weeks escorted replenishment ships to the quarantine area. When this display of national strength and determination forced the Kremlin to withdraw the missiles, John W. Weeks returned via San Juan, Puerto Rico, to Norfolk.

Early in 1963, while preparing for another Mediterranean deployment from February–April, the destroyer received the Battle Efficiency "E" for outstanding service. She headed for the Mediterranean on 29 November. The end of the year found her patrolling off troubled Cyprus, standing by ready to evacuate, if necessary, Americans from that strife-torn island. On New Year's Day, en route to the Red Sea to join that U.S. Middle East Force, she was the first ship to transit the Suez Canal during 1964. She visited Jidda, Saudi Arabia; Berbera, Somali Republic, Aden, Aden Protectorate; Djibouti, French Somaliland; Massawa, Ethiopia; and Karachi, Pakistan. She headed west from Karachi on 6 February; refueled at Aden; then turned south for patrol along the Zanzibar coast during the revolution there, and off Kenya and Tanganyika during unrest in those countries. She departed Mombasa, Kenya on 24 February and transited the Suez Canal on 6 March. After patrolling the Mediterranean, John W. Weeks departed Pollença Bay, Mallorca, for home on 12 May and reached Norfolk on 23 May.

After overhaul in Norfolk Naval Shipyard, the destroyer departed Hampton Roads on 9 November for Guantanamo Bay and refresher training. She returned to Norfolk early in January 1965 to prepare for another Mediterranean cruise. She got underway 13 February and arrived Valencia, Spain on 5 March. She stopped at Naples for a fortnight en route to the Suez Canal and 2 months of duty in the Red Sea. Back in the Mediterranean 2 June, the destroyer headed for home 30 June and returned to Norfolk 12 July.

Late in the summer, the destroyer was on the Gemini 5 recovery team. For the remainder of the year, she operated out of Norfolk in the Caribbean and along the Atlantic Coast. She continued ASW exercises in the Caribbean until returning to Norfolk on 3 February 1966. After serving as sonar school ship at Key West during March and April, the veteran destroyer departed Norfolk 16 May for European waters.

Steaming with DesRon 2, John W. Weeks spent the next 3 months cruising the western coast of Europe from Norway to France. She took part in anti-submarine warfare (ASW) exercises, and during Operation "Straight Laced," a simulated invasion of the Norwegian coast, she operated with British and West German ships. While carrying out ASW duty during this exercise, she made the only simulated submarine kill in the operation on 19 August. Departing Derry, Northern Ireland on 24 August, she returned to Norfolk on 2 September. During the remainder of the year she served as school ship at Key West and joined in ASW exercises along the Atlantic Coast and in the Caribbean.

John W. Weeks continued this duty until early in July 1967 when she departed Norfolk for deployment in the South Atlantic and Indian Oceans. Steaming via San Juan, Puerto Rico, and Recife, Brazil, she touched at African ports on the east and west coasts of that continent and ranged Africa from the Gulf of Guinea to the Red Sea.

The destroyer departed from Norfolk, Virginia in January 1969 for duty off the coast of Vietnam. She operated with four aircraft carriers while there. She returned home in September 1969.

== Decommissioning and disposal ==
She was decommissioned and stricken on 12 August 1970, and finished her service as a gunnery target. She was sunk in the Atlantic Ocean off Virginia on 19 November 1970. Her final resting place is 1,300 fathoms (7,800 feet; 2,400 meters) down, at 37°10′54″N 073°45′36″W.

== Awards ==
John W. Weeks received four battle stars for World War II service.
