= Town-class destroyer =

1940 Royal Navy destroyer class

- HMS Leamington

Class overview
- Name: Town class
- Builders: Various
- Operators: Royal Navy; Royal Canadian Navy; Royal Netherlands Navy; Royal Norwegian Navy; Soviet Navy
- Built: 1917–1920
- In commission: 1940–1947 (RN)
- Completed: 50
- Lost: 10
- Retired: 40 scrapped
- Preserved: 0

General characteristics
- Type: Destroyer: USN Caldwell, Wickes and Clemson classes
- Displacement: 1,020 to 1,190 tons
- Length: 314 ft 4.5 in (95.8 m) to 315 ft 6 in (96.2 m)
- Beam: 31 ft (9.4 m) to 31 ft 8 in (9.7 m)-
- Draught: 11 ft 0 in (3.4 m) to 12 ft 10 in (3.9 m)
- Propulsion: 4 × 300 psi (2,100 kPa) unsuperheated Boilers; 2 geared turbines
- Speed: 30–35 knots (56–65 km/h; 35–40 mph)
- Complement: 146
- Armament: 3 × 4 in/50 cal; 1 × 3 in/23 anti-aircraft gun; 2 × triple 21 in torpedo tubes

The Town-class destroyers were a group of 50 destroyers of the Royal Navy and the Royal Canadian Navy that were in service during the Second World War. They were transferred from the United States Navy in exchange for military bases in the British West Indies and Newfoundland, as outlined in the Destroyers for Bases Agreement between the United Kingdom and United States, signed on 2 September 1940. They were known as "four-pipers" or "four-stackers" because they had four smokestacks (funnels). Later classes of destroyers typically had one or two.

Some went to the Royal Canadian Navy at the outset. Others went on to the Royal Norwegian Navy, the Royal Netherlands Navy, and the Soviet Navy after serving with the Royal Navy. Although given a set of names by the Commonwealth navies that suggested they were one class they actually came from three classes of destroyer: Caldwell, Wickes, and Clemson. "Town class" refers to the Admiralty's practice of renaming these ships after towns common to the United States and the British Commonwealth. Ships initially commissioned into the Royal Canadian Navy, however, followed the Canadian practice of giving destroyers the names of Canadian rivers. The rivers selected for the Town class were on the border between Canada and the United States, with the exception of Annapolis – the name of both a river in Annapolis County, Nova Scotia, and the location of the United States Naval Academy.

One of the Town-class ships achieved lasting fame: HMS Campbeltown (ex-USS Buchanan). In the Commando raid Operation Chariot, Campbeltown, fitted with a large demolition charge, rammed the gates of the Normandie dock at Saint-Nazaire, France. The charge detonated on 29 March 1942, breaching the drydock and destroying Campbeltown, thus destroying the only drydock on the Atlantic coast capable of accepting the Tirpitz. This exploit was depicted in the 1950 Trevor Howard film The Gift Horse, which starred HMS Leamington (ex-USS Twiggs) after her return from service in the Soviet Union.

== Characteristics ==
Built for service during the First World War, but in the main completed after the end of that conflict, the flush-deckers were, by 1940, the oldest destroyers in the US Navy, and many had been mothballed for the inter-war period. While contemporaneous to the British V and W-class destroyers they were not much liked by their crews. While the V and W classes set a new standard for destroyer design, the flush-deckers were already obsolescent by comparison. They were uncomfortable and wet, working badly in a seaway. Their hull lines were rather narrow and 'herring-gutted' which gave them a vicious roll. The officers didn't like the way they handled either, since they had been built with propellers that turned the same way (2-screw ships normally have the shafts turning in opposite directions as the direction of rotation has effects on the rudder and the whole ship when manoeuvring, especially when coming alongside), so these were as awkward to handle as single-screw ships. Their turning circle was enormous, as big as most Royal Navy battleships, making them difficult to use in a submarine hunt which demanded tight manoeuvres, compounded by unreliable "chain and cog" steering gear laid across the main deck. They also had fully enclosed bridges which caused problems with reflections in the glass at night. One Royal Canadian Navy corvette captain described them as "the most dubious gift since the Trojan Horse". However, despite their disadvantages they were a welcome addition to forces escorting convoys in the Atlantic at a time when the U-boats, operating from newly acquired bases on the Atlantic coast of France were becoming an increasingly serious threat to British shipping. They were also seen as an earnest of the United States’ commitment to support Britain against Nazism.

The original armament was four 4-inch (102 mm) guns, one 3-inch (76 mm) anti-aircraft gun, and twelve torpedo tubes. On the Wickes-class, the 4-inch gun placement was one gun in a shield on the foredeck, one on the quarterdeck and one each side on a platform between the number 2 and number 3 funnels. The Admiralty promptly removed one of the 4-inch guns and six torpedo tubes to improve stability. Twenty-three of the class had further armament reductions for anti-submarine escort of trade convoys. Two of the remaining 4-inch guns and three of the remaining torpedo tubes were removed to allow increased depth charge stowage and installation of Hedgehog anti-submarine mortar system.

== Ships in class by origin ==
The ships were divided by the Royal Navy into four groups based on their characteristics.

- Type A corresponded to the 20 ships of the Clemson class, having a standard displacement of 1,190 tons powered by geared turbines that produced a maximum speed of 28.5 knots. They were armed with four single 4-inch guns and one 3-inch anti-aircraft gun, with triple 21-inch torpedo tubes. Overall length was 314 ft 4 in, beam 31 ft 8 in and draught 12 ft 10 in.
- Type B were the 12 ships of the Wickes class built to plans prepared by the Bath Iron Works. These were lighter than the type A ships, with a displacement of 1090 tons but they had the same armament and machinery with a slightly better speed of 28.75 kt.
- Type C were the 15 ships of the Wickes class built to plans prepared by Bethlehem Steel, with a displacement of 1,060 tons and an improved speed of 29.75 kt.
- Type D were the 3 ships of the Caldwell class, smaller again at 1020 tons, with a gun armament of four single 3-inch guns and built with direct drive turbines, but having a speed of 30 kt. The type D vessels were recognizable also in having only three funnels.

Town-class ship characteristics by Type
Characteristic	Type A	Type B	Type C	Type D
Standard disp., long tons (t)	1,190	1,090	1,060	1,020
Full load disp., long tons (t)	1,725	1,530	1,530	1,445
Length (oa)	314 ft 4 in (95.81 m)	314 ft 4 in (95.81 m)	314 ft 4 in (95.81 m)	315 ft 6 in (96.16 m)
Beam	31' 8"	31' 0"	31' 8"	31' 2"
Draught	12 ft 10 in (3.91 m)	11 ft 11 in (3.63 m)	11 ft 11 in (3.63 m)	11 ft 0 in (3.35 m)
Machinery	geared turbines	geared turbines	geared turbines	direct drive turbines
Boilers	4	4	4	4
Shafts	2	2	2	3
Speed, knots (kt)	28.5	28.75	29.75	30
Main armament	4 × 4-inch guns in single mounts			4 × 1 3/50 gun
Anti-aircraft guns	1 × 3-inch gun.			1 × 1 3/23
Torpedo tubes	4 × 3 21-in.	4 × 3 21-in.	4 × 3 21-in.	4 × 3 21-in.

Town-class destroyers assigned to the Royal Canadian Navy
Name	Type	ex- USN	Class	Builder	Completed	Transferred
Annapolis	C	USS MacKenzie	Wickes	Union Iron Works	25 July 1919	29 September 1940
Columbia	C	USS Haraden	Wickes	Seattle Dry Dock Co.	6 June 1919	24 September 1940
Niagara	C	USS Thatcher	Wickes	Bethlehem Steel; Fore River	14 January 1919	26 September 1940
St. Clair	C	USS Williams	Wickes	Union Iron Works	1 March 1919	29 September 1940
St. Croix	A	USS McCook	Clemson	Bethlehem Steel; Quincy	30 April 1919	24 September 1940
St. Francis	A	USS Bancroft	Clemson	Bethlehem Steel; Quincy	30 June 1919	24 September 1940

Town-class destroyers assigned to the Royal Navy
Name	Type	ex- USN	Class	Builder	Completed	Transferred
Bath	C	USS Hopewell	Wickes	Newport News SB Co.	21 March 1919	23 September 1940
Belmont	A	USS Satterlee	Clemson	Newport News SB Co.	22 December 1919	8 October 1940
Beverley	A	USS Branch	Clemson	Newport News SB Co.	3 April 1920	8 October 1940
Bradford	A	USS McLanahan	Clemson	Bethlehem Steel; Squantum	5 September 1919	8 October 1940
Brighton	C	USS Cowell	Wickes	Bethlehem Steel; Fore River	17 March 1919	23 September 1940
Broadwater	A	USS Mason	Clemson	Newport News SB Co.	28 February 1920	2 October 1940
Broadway	A	USS Hunt	Clemson	Newport News SB Co.	8 June 1920	8 October 1940
Burnham	A	USS Aulick	Clemson	Bethlehem Steel; Quincy	26 July 1919	8 October 1940
Burwell	A	USS Laub	Clemson	Bethlehem Steel; Squantum	17 March 1919	8 October 1940
Buxton	A	USS Edwards	Clemson	Bethlehem Steel; Squantum	24 April 1919	8 October 1940
Caldwell	B	USS Hale	Wickes	Bath Iron Works	12 June 1919	9 September 1940
Cameron	A	USS Welles	Clemson	Bethlehem Steel; Quincy	2 September 1919	9 September 1940
Campbeltown	B	USS Buchanan	Wickes	Bath Iron Works	20 January 1919	9 September 1940
Castleton	B	USS Aaron Ward	Wickes	Bath Iron Works	21 April 1919	9 September 1940
Charlestown	C	USS Abbot	Wickes	Newport News SB Co.	18 July 1919	23 September 1940
Chelsea	B	USS Crowninshield	Wickes	Bath Iron Works	6 August 1919	9 September 1940
Chesterfield	A	USS Welborn C. Wood	Clemson	Newport News SB Co.	25 June 1920	9 September 1940
Churchill	A	USS Herndon	Clemson	Newport News SB Co.	17 April 1920	9 September 1940
Clare	A	USS Abel P. Upshur	Clemson	Newport News SB Co.	21 May 1920	9 September 1940
Georgetown	C	USS Maddox	Wickes	Bethlehem Steel; Fore River	10 March 1919	23 September 1940
Hamilton	C	USS Kalk	Wickes	Bethlehem Steel; Fore River	29 March 1919	23 September 1940
Lancaster	B	USS Philip	Wickes	Bath Iron Works	25 August 1919	23 October 1940
Leamington	B	USS Twiggs	Wickes	New York SB Co.	28 July 1919	23 October 1940
Leeds	D	USS Conner	Caldwell	Cramp	12 January 1918	23 October 1940
Lewes	D	USS Conway	Caldwell	Norfolk Navy Yard	19 October 1918	23 October 1940
Lincoln	B	USS Yarnall	Wickes	Cramp	29 November 1918	23 October 1940
Ludlow	D	USS Stockton	Caldwell	Cramp	26 November 1917	23 October 1940
Mansfield	B	USS Evans	Wickes	Bath Iron Works	11 November 1918	23 October 1940
Montgomery	B	USS Wickes	Wickes	Bath Iron Works	31 July 1918	25 October 1940
Newark	C	USS Ringgold	Wickes	Union Iron Works	14 November 1918	5 December 1940
Newmarket	C	USS Robinson	Wickes	Union Iron Works	19 October 1918	5 December 1940
Newport	C	USS Sigourney	Wickes	Bethlehem Steel; Fore River	14 May 1918	5 December 1940
Ramsey	A	USS Meade	Clemson	Bethlehem Steel; Squantum	8 September 1919	26 November 1940
Reading	A	USS Bailey	Clemson	Bethlehem Steel; Squantum	27 June 1919	26 November 1940
Richmond	B	USS Fairfax	Wickes	Mare Island Navy Yard	6 April 1918	26 November 1940
Ripley	A	USS Shubrick	Clemson	Bethlehem Steel; Squantum	2 July 1919	26 November 1940
Rockingham	A	USS Swasey	Clemson	Bethlehem Steel; Squantum	31 July 1919	26 November 1940
Roxborough	C	USS Foote	Wickes	Bethlehem Steel; Fore River	21 March 1919	23 September 1940
Salisbury	B	USS Claxton	Wickes	Mare Island Navy Yard	13 September 1919	5 December 1940
St Albans	C	USS Thomas	Wickes	Newport News SB Co.	25 April 1919	23 September 1940
St. Mary's	C	USS Doran	Wickes	Newport News SB Co.	26 August 1919	23 September 1940
Sherwood	A	USS Rodgers	Clemson	Bethlehem Steel; Quincy	22 July 1919	23 October 1940
Stanley	A	USS McCalla	Clemson	Bethlehem Steel; Quincy	19 May 1919	23 October 1940
Wells	B	USS Tillman	Wickes	Charleston Navy Yard	30 April 1921	5 December 1940

== Ships in class by operator ==
=== Royal Canadian Navy ===
Town-class destroyers of the Royal Canadian Navy
Name	Ex-	Date acquired	Service	Fate
Annapolis	USS MacKenzie	29 September 1940	convoy escort with WLEF; relegated to training ship April 1944	towed to Boston for scrapping on 22 June 1945.
Buxton	HMS Buxton	August 1942	convoy escort with WLEF; relegated to training ship August 1943	She was scrapped on 21 March 1946.
Columbia	USS Haraden	24 September 1940	convoy escort with WLEF; relegated to replenishment hulk Feb 1944	She was scrapped on 7 August 1945.
Hamilton	HMS Hamilton	June 1941	convoy escort with WLEF; relegated to tender August 1943	lost while being towed to Boston for scrapping in 1945.
Niagara	USS Thatcher	26 September 1940	on 28 August 1941 Niagara was involved in the capture of U-570, which had surrendered to an RAF Hudson the previous day	She was scrapped by the end of 1947.
St. Clair	USS Williams	29 September 1940	convoy escort with NEF, then WLEF. relegated to submarine depot ship 1943	She was scrapped on 5 March 1946.
St. Croix	USS McCook	24 September 1940	escorting convoy ON 113 she attacked and sank U-90 on 27 July 1942; escorting convoy KMS-10, St Croix and HMCS Shediac sank U-87	while escorting the combined convoys ONS 18/ON 202, St Croix was twice torpedoed by U-305 and sunk on 20 September 1943; survivors were taken aboard the frigate HMS Itchen, which was sunk on 22 September with very heavy loss of life; only one of St Croix's crew of 147 survived.
St. Francis	USS Bancroft	24 September 1940	convoy escort with MOEF; relegated to training early 1944	She was wrecked while being towed for scrapping on 14 July 1945.

=== RCN (loaned from the Royal Navy) ===
Town-class destroyers of the Royal Canadian Navy (loaned from the Royal Navy)
Name	Ex-	Date acquired	Service	Fate
Chelsea	HMS Chelsea	November 1942	transferred to the Soviet Union as Derzky on 16 July 1944; returned to the Royal Navy on 24 June 1949	She was scrapped on 27 July 1949.
Georgetown	HMS Georgetown	September 1942	transferred to the Soviet Union as Zhyostky in August 1944; returned to the Royal Navy on 9 September 1952	She was scrapped on 16 September 1952.
Leamington	HMS Leamington	November 1942	during the fighting around convoy SC 42 in the North Atlantic she shared in the sinking of U-207 on 11 September 1941; while covering convoy WS-17 in the UK approaches, sank U-587 on 27 March 1942; transferred to the Soviet Union as Zhguchy on 17 July 1944; returned on 15 November 1950; hired for the film The Gift Horse, the last Town-class destroyer at sea under her own power	She was scrapped on 3 December 1951.
Lincoln	HNoMS Lincoln	July 1942	transferred to the Soviet Union as Druzhny on 26 August 1944; returned to the Royal Navy on 24 August 1952	She was scrapped on 3 September 1952.
Mansfield	HNoMS Mansfield	September 1942	heavily involved in the critical convoy actions of March 1943 with convoy HX 229, landing survivors in the United Kingdom	sold on 24 October 1944 for scrapping.
Montgomery	HMS Montgomery	December 1941	on convoy escort Montgomery rescued the survivors of Scottish Standard on 21 February 1941 and sank the Italian submarine Marcello the next day	She was scrapped on 10 April 1945.
Richmond	HMS Richmond	June 1943	transferred to the Soviet Union as Zhivuchy on 16 June 1944; returned to the Royal Navy on 26 June 1949	She was scrapped on 29 June 1949.
Salisbury	HMS Salisbury	September 1942	she was employed as a special escort for specific convoys, including escorting Wasp during the supply of Spitfires to Malta	She was scrapped in the US in April 1945.

=== Royal Navy ===
Town-class destroyers of the Royal Navy
Name	Ex-	Date acquired	Service	Fate
Bath	USS Hopewell	23 September 1940	Assigned to 1st Minelaying Squadron. Transferred to the Royal Norwegian Navy as HNoMS Bath on 9 April 1941, joining the 5th Escort Group	lost on 19 August 1941 while escorting convoy OG71, torpedoed by U-204.
Belmont	USS Satterlee	8 October 1940	Did not become full operational until 20 August 1941, assigned to the 3rd Escort group	lost with all hands on 31 January 1941 while escorting troop convoy NA-2, torpedoed by U-82.
Beverley	USS Branch	8 October 1940	Assigned to 6th Escort Group. Sank U-187 on 4 February 1942	lost on 11 April 1943, torpedoed by U-188.
Bradford	USS McLanahan	8 October 1940	Did not become fully operational until October 1941, assigned to 43rd Escort Group. Very poor mechanical reliability, recommissioned on 14 May 1943 as Accommodation Ship HMS Foliott in Devonport	consigned for scrapping on 19 June 1946.
Brighton	USS Cowell	23 September 1940	Assigned to 1st Minelaying Squadron. Reduced to Air target Ship for the Fleet Air Arm in November 1942. Placed in Reserve in March 1944. To the Soviet Union as Zharky on 16 July 1944 as replacement for Italian Navy prize-of-war. Returned to the Royal Navy on 4 March 1949	consigned for scrapping on 18 May 1949.
Broadwater	USS Mason	2 October 1940	Assigned to 11th Escort Group	lost on 18 October 1941 while escorting convoy SC48, torpedoed by U-101.
Broadway	USS Hunt	8 October 1940	Operational from 28 April 1941, assigned to 11th Escort Group. While escorting convoy OB 318 took part in the capture of U-110 on 9 May 1941. While escorting convoy HX 237 sank U-89 in the North Atlantic on 14 May 1943. Refitted as an Air Target Ship on late 1943.	consigned for scrapping in March 1948.
Burnham	USS Aulick	8 October 1940	Assigned to 12th Escort Group, then to Newfoundland Escort Force (May 1941), then to Canadian C3 Escort Group (January 1942). Reduced to Air Target Ship on early 1944.	consigned for scrapping on 2 December 1948.
Burwell	USS Laub	8 October 1940	Assigned to 12th Escort Group, then to Newfoundland Escort Force (July 1941). Took part in the capture of U-570 in August 1941. Reduced to Air Target Ship in October 1943.	consigned for scrapping in March 1947.
Buxton	USS Edwards	8 October 1940	Assigned to 26th Escort Group, then to B6 Group (May 1942), then to the Royal Canadian Navy Western Local Escort Force (August 1942) as HMCS Buxton, as a static training ship	consigned for scrapping on 21 March 1946
Caldwell	USS Hale	9 September 1940	Assigned to the 17th Escort Group, then to 5th Escort Group (December 1940), then to RCN Western Local Force (2 December 1942). In reserve from 29 December 1943.	consigned for scrapping on 7 June 1945.
Cameron	USS Welles	9 September 1940	heavily damaged by a German air raid in Portsmouth on 5 December 1940, thereafter used only for shock trials and damage control investigation and instruction. Listed for disposal from 5 October 1943	consigned for scrapping on 1 December 1944.
Campbeltown	USS Buchanan	9 September 1940	Assigned to 17th Destroyer Flotilla, then to 7th Escort Group (September 1941). To Netherlands as Campbeltown in March 1941. Returned September 1941	used as an explosive ram during Operation Chariot, 28 March 1942
Castleton	USS Aaron Ward	9 September 1940	Assigned to 17th Destroyer Flotilla, hen 1st Minelying Squadron (7 March 1941). Reduced to Air Target Ship in October 1943, with a return to active service in the Rosyth Escort Force (January–October 1944). Decommissioned in March 1945	consigned for scrapping on 4 March 1947
Charlestown	USS Abbot	23 September 1940	Assigned to 1st Minelying Squadron, then to Orkney and Shetland Command (early 1943), then to Rosyth Escort Force (October 1943). Decommissioned in January 1945	consigned for scrapping on 3 December 1948.
Chelsea	USS Crowninshield	9 September 1940	Assigned to the 17th Flotilla, then to 6th Escort Group (December 1941). To RCN Western Local Escort Force as HMCS Chelsea in November 1942; to the Soviet Union as Derzky in July 1944	returned on 24 June 1949 consigned for scrapping on 29 July 1949
Chesterfield	USS Welborn C. Wood	9 September 1940	Assigned to 11th Escort Group, underwent a lot of transfers to 3rd Escort Group (May 41), 18th EG (June 41), 23rd EG (July 11), 26th BG (Jan 42), B7 Group (June 1942). Reduced Air Target Ship in the Rosyth Command (November 1943). Decommissioned on 15 January 1945	consigned for scrapping on 3 December 1948
Churchill	USS Herndon	9 September 1940	Assigned to the 3rd Escort Group, then to 18th Escort Group, then to B5 Group (January 1942), then to RCN C4 Escort Group (late 1942). In Reserve from February 1944. To the Soviet Union as Deyatelny in July 1944	lost on 16 January 1945, torpedoed by U-956
Clare	USS Abel P. Upshur	9 September 1940	Operational only from 14 October 1941, assigned to the 41st Escort Group. Reduced to Air Target Ship in June 1944.	consigned for scrapping on 18 February 1947.
Georgetown	USS Maddox	23 September 1940	Assigned to the 4th Escort Group, then to 3rd Escort Group (July 1941), then to 27th Escort Group (Sept.1941), then to the Special Escort Division of the Greenock force (June 1942). To Canada as HMCS Georgetown in September 1942, as part of the Western Local Escort Force. In reserve from November 1943. To the Soviet Union as Zhyostky in August 1944., returned to British service on 9 September 1959	consigned for scrapping on 16 September 1959.
Hamilton	USS Kalk	23 September 1940	Operational from 12 July 1941 only, to Canada as HMCS Hamilton in June 1941 but retaining its British name. In reserve from August 1943, then static training ship from December 1943	sank under tow while being delivered for scrapping, probably on 14 July 1945.
Lancaster	USS Philip	23 October 1940	Assigned to 1st Minelying Squadron, then to Rosyth Command (mid 1943). Reduced to Air Target Ship from February 1942.	consigned for scrapping on 30 May 1947.
Leamington	USS Twiggs	23 October 1940	Assigned to 2nd Escort group. Took part in the sinking of U-587 on 23 March 1942. To Canada in the Western Local Escort Force as HMCS Leamington in January 1943. Returned to British service in December 1943 and placed in reserve from February 1944. To the Soviet Union as Zhguchy in July 1944, returned on 15 November 1950. Starred in 1950 film The Gift Horse, which depicted the St. Nazaire Raid	consigned for scrapping in July 1951.
Leeds	USS Conner	23 October 1940	an unusual ship of the class, with three funnels only, different machinery and weapons arrangements and a different bow. Very poor mechanical reliability, passed much of its service under repairs, until finally decommissioned on 10 April 1945	consigned for scrapping on 19 January 1949.
Lewes	USS Conway	23 October 1940	damaged by a German air attack during the initial refitting, entered operational service only in February 1942 assigned to the Rosyth Command. Air Target Ship from January to March 1943, then to South Atlantic Command. To East Indies Command in August 1944, then to British Pacific Fleet as a target ship in 1945	scuttled off Sydney, Australia on 25 May 1946.
Lincoln	USS Yarnall	23 October 1940	Assigned to 1st Escort Group. To Norway as HNoMS Lincoln in February 1942, then to Canada as HMCS Lincoln in November 1942, in both cases assigned to the Western Local Escort Force, then to Western Support Force. To the Soviet Union as Druzny returned on 24 August 1952	consigned for scrapping on 3 September 1952.
Ludlow	USS Stockton	23 October 1940	Assigned to the Rosyth Command	beached as a target for rocket firing aircraft off Fidra Island, United Kingdom, on 6 June 1945
Mansfield	USS Evans	23 October 1940	to Norway as HNoMS Mansfield in December 1940; to Canada as HMCS Mansfield in September 1942	Scrapped 1945
Montgomery	USS Wickes	25 October 1940	to Canada as HMCS Montgomery in December 1941	Scrapped April 1945
Newark	USS Ringgold	5 December 1940	convoy escort with Western Approaches Command	consigned for scrapping on 18 February 1947.
Newmarket	USS Robinson	5 December 1940	convoy escort with Western Approaches Command	She was scrapped on 21 September 1945.
Newport	USS Sigourney	5 December 1940	to Norway as HNoMS Newport in March 1941	She was scrapped on 18 February 1947.
Ramsey	USS Meade	26 November 1940	convoy escort with Western Approaches Command	She was scrapped July 1947.
Reading	USS Bailey	26 November 1940	convoy escort with Western Approaches Command	She was scrapped on 24 July 1945.
Richmond	USS Fairfax	26 November 1940	to Canada as HMCS Richmond in June 1943; to the Soviet Union as Zhivuchy in June 1944	Returned and scrapped June 1949
Ripley	USS Shubrick	26 November 1940	convoy escort with Western Approaches Command	consigned for scrapping on 10 March 1945.
Rockingham	USS Swasey	26 November 1940	convoy escort with Western Approaches Command	while returning to Aberdeen on 27 September 1944, poor navigation brought her into the defensive minefields off the east coast of the United Kingdom, and after striking a mine Rockingham was abandoned and sank with the loss of one life.
Roxborough	USS Foote	23 September 1940	while with convoy HX 222 Roxborough met with such heavy weather that the entire bridge structure was crushed, with eleven dead, including the Commanding Officer and 1st Lieutenant; the sole surviving executive officer managed to regain control of the ship, and under hand steering from aft, she made St. John's, Newfoundland; to the Soviet Union as Doblestny on 10 August 1944; returned to the Royal Navy on 7 February 1949	She was scrapped on 14 May 1949.
Salisbury	USS Claxton	5 December 1940	to Canada as HMCS Salisbury in September 1942	Scrapped April 1945
Sherwood	USS Rodgers	23 October 1940	convoy escort with Western Approaches Command	stripped of usable parts, Sherwood was beached on 3 October 1943 as a target for RAF rocket-equipped Beaufighters.
St Albans	USS Thomas	23 September 1940	to Norway as HNoMS St. Albans in April 1941; to the Soviet Union as Dostoyny in July 1944; returned to the Royal Navy on 28 February 1949	towed for scrapping on 18 May 1949.
St. Mary's	USS Doran	23 September 1940	convoy escort with Western Approaches Command	She was scrapped in December 1945.
Stanley	USS McCalla	23 October 1940	escorting convoy HG 76 from Gibraltar, Stanley and accompanying vessels sank U-131 on 17 December 1941 and U-434 on the following day	Stanley was sunk by U-574 on 19 December 1941 with the loss of all but 25 of her crew.
Wells	USS Tillman	5 December 1940	convoy escort with Western Approaches Command	She was scrapped February 1946.

=== Royal Netherlands Navy ===
Town-class destroyers of the Royal Netherlands Navy
Name	Ex-	Date acquired	Service	Fate
Campbeltown	HMS Campbeltown	March 1941	Returned to RN service in Sept 1941 as HMS Campbeltown	expended 28 March 1942 in Operation Chariot

=== Royal Norwegian Navy ===
Town-class destroyers of the Royal Norwegian Navy
Name	Ex-	Date acquired	Service	Fate
Bath	HMS Bath	9 April 1941	convoy escort with Western Approaches Command	while escorting convoy OG 71 between Liverpool and Gibraltar, Bath was torpedoed by U-204 on 19 August 1941 and sank rapidly.
Lincoln	HMS Lincoln	February 1942	to RCN as HMCS Lincoln in July 1942; to Soviet Union as Druzhny on 26 August 1944; returned to Royal Navy on 24 August 1952	Scrapped on 3 September 1952.
Mansfield	HMS Mansfield	December 1940	to RCN as HMCS Mansfield in September 1942	sold on 24 October 1944 for scrapping.
Newport	HMS Newport	March 1941	returned to RN in June 1942	scrapped 1947.
St. Albans	HMS St Albans	14 April 1941	while with convoy SL 81, St Albans took part in the sinking of U-401 on 3 August 1941; encountered the Polish submarine Jastrzab, and in company with the minesweeper Seagull, attacked and sank it in early 1942; transferred to the Soviet Union as Dostoyny on 16 July 1944; returned to the Royal Navy on 28 February 1949	towed for scrapping on 18 May 1949.

=== Soviet Navy ===
Town-class destroyers of the Soviet Navy
Name	Ex-	Date acquired	Service	Fate
Deyatelny	HMS Churchill	16 July 1944	convoy escort in the Arctic Ocean	torpedoed and sunk by U-956 on 16 January 1945 while escorting a White Sea convoy; the last war loss of the class and the only one of the destroyers transferred to the Soviet Union to be lost.
Derzky	HMCS Chelsea	16 July 1944	returned to the Royal Navy on 24 June 1949	Scrapped on 27 July 1949.
Doblestny	HMS Roxborough	10 August 1944	returned to the Royal Navy on 7 February 1949	Scrapped on 14 May 1949.
Dostoyny	HNoMS St. Albans	16 July 1944	returned to the Royal Navy on 28 February 1949	towed for scrapping on 18 May 1949.
Druzhny	HMCS Lincoln	26 August 1944	returned to the Royal Navy on 24 August 1952	Scrapped on 3 September 1952.
Zharky	HMS Brighton	16 July 1944	returned to the Royal Navy on 4 March 1949	Scrapped on 18 May 1949.
Zhguchy	HMCS Leamington	17 July 1944	returned on 15 November 1950	Scrapped on 3 December 1951.
Zhivuchy	HMCS Richmond	16 June 1944	returned to the Royal Navy on 26 June 1949	Scrapped on 29 June 1949.
Zhyostky	HMCS Georgetown	August 1944	returned to the Royal Navy on 9 September 1952	Scrapped on 16 September 1952.
