= USS Welles (DD-257) =

Clemson-class destroyer

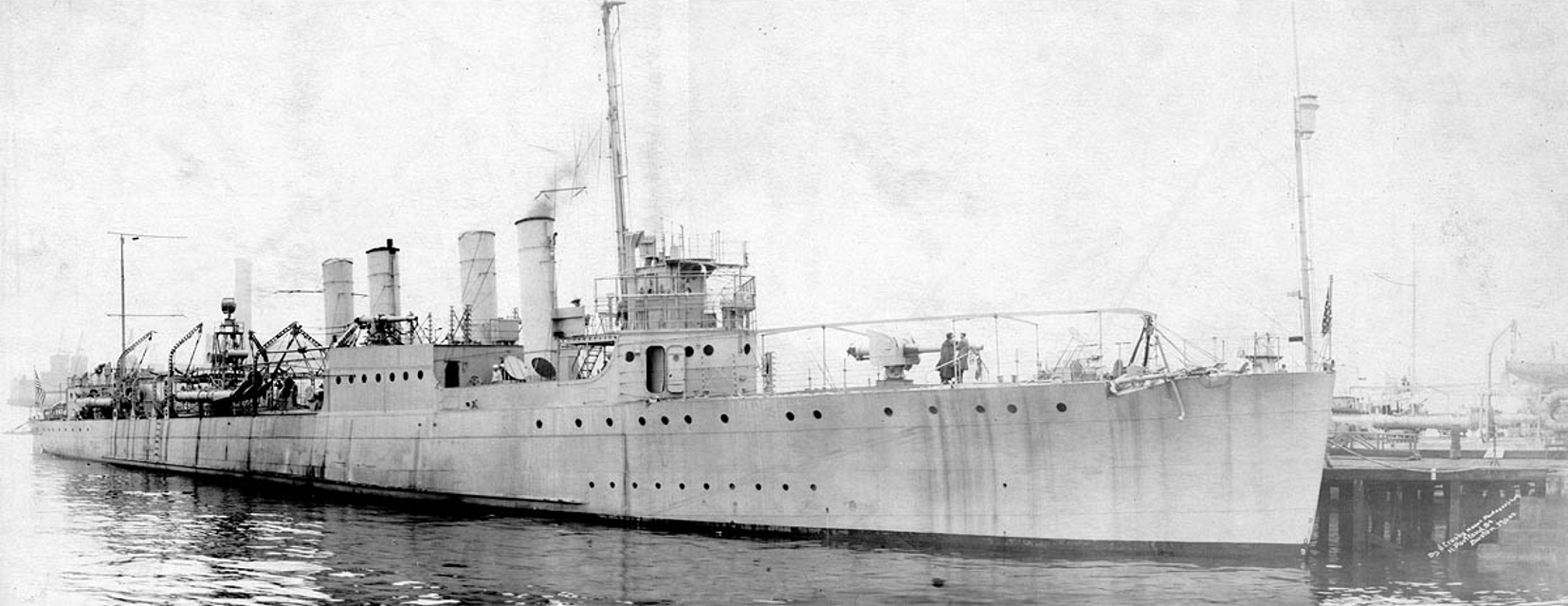

History

United States
- Name: USS Welles
- Namesake: Gideon Welles
- Builder: Bethlehem Shipbuilding Corporation, Fore River Shipyard, Quincy
- Laid down: 13 November 1918
- Launched: 8 May 1919
- Commissioned: 2 September 1919
- Decommissioned: 9 September 1940
- Stricken: 8 January 1941
- Identification: DD-257
- Fate: Transferred to the United Kingdom, 9 September 1940

United Kingdom
- Name: HMS Cameron
- Acquired: 9 September 1940
- Commissioned: 9 September 1940
- Identification: Pennant number:I05
- Fate: Damaged beyond repair by enemy action, 5 December 1940; used as a storage hulk until sold for scrap, 1944

General characteristics
- Class & type: Clemson-class destroyer
- Displacement: 1,215 tons
- Length: 314 ft 4 in (95.81 m)
- Beam: 31 ft 8 in (9.65 m)
- Draft: 9 ft 10 in (3.00 m)
- Propulsion: 26,500 shp (19,800 kW); geared turbines, 2 screws
- Speed: 35 knots (65 km/h; 40 mph)
- Range: 4,900 nmi (9,100 km; 5,600 mi) at 15 kn (28 km/h; 17 mph)
- Complement: 130 officers and enlisted
- Armament: 4 x 4 in (100 mm) guns; 1 x 3 in (76 mm) gun; 12 x 21 inch (533 mm) torpedo tubes

The first USS Welles (DD-257) was a Clemson-class destroyer in the United States Navy, and transferred to the Royal Navy where she served as HMS Cameron (I05) during World War II.

== As USS Welles ==
Named for Gideon Welles, she was laid down on 13 November 1918 - two days after the signing of the armistice that ended World War I - by the Bethlehem Shipbuilding Corporation's Fore River plant. The ship was launched on 8 May 1919; sponsored by Miss Alma Freeman Welles, the granddaughter of Gideon Welles. Welles was commissioned at the Boston Navy Yard on 2 September 1919.

After her final sea trials off the east coast, Welles joined Squadron 2, Destroyer Force, Pacific Fleet, based at San Diego, California. She operated out of San Diego, "showing the flag" and training, until she was decommissioned there on 15 June 1922. Meanwhile, the destroyer was classified as DD-257 during the fleet-wide assignment of alphanumeric hull numbers on 17 July 1920.

Welles remained at San Diego into the 1930s, as crises multiplied in Europe and the Far East. On 1 September 1939, German forces invaded Poland, triggering World War II. In response to the European conflict, President Franklin D. Roosevelt proclaimed the neutrality of the United States and instructed the Navy to establish a Neutrality Patrol off the eastern seaboard, out of Guantanamo Bay, and at the eastward approaches of the Panama Canal.

To carry out the patrol, the Navy recommissioned 77 destroyers and light minelayers to augment fleet units already at sea that had assumed their patrol stations in September 1939, soon after the outbreak of fighting in Poland. Welles was recommissioned at San Diego on 6 November 1939. She was fitted out at San Diego and then moved to the Mare Island Navy Yard, Vallejo, California, to undergo alterations and a drydocking that started a few days before Christmas and extended into the new year, 1940.

Following the yard work, Welles arrived back at San Diego in company with the destroyer Williams and later departed the area on 5 February, bound for Panama. She transited the Panama Canal on the 16th and stopped at the Submarine Base at Coco Solo on the following day. There, she embarked six enlisted men for transportation to Guantanamo Bay, Cuba, and arrived there on 25 February.

After patrolling the approaches to Guantanamo Bay for nearly two weeks, Welles - transporting 10 enlisted men - sailed for Norfolk, Virginia, with the remainder of her division (Destroyer Division (DesDiv) 67): Welborn C. Wood, Abel P. Upshur, and division flagship Herndon on 14 March. Mooring at the navy yard and discharging her passengers on the 17th, the destroyer proceeded to sea on 6 April, bound for the Caribbean.

Arriving at San Juan, Puerto Rico, four days later, Welles departed the same evening. She joined the cruiser Omaha on the following morning, and the two ships sailed in company on Neutrality Patrol and conducted exercises until 17 April, when the destroyer returned to San Juan.

Welles patrolled the waters near San Juan from 19 to 23 April before taking part in a battle problem and undergoing her annual military inspection on the 26th. The warship subsequently visited Charlotte Amalie, St. Thomas, Virgin Islands, on 1 May. She remained there for two weeks before returning to San Juan.

Proceeding to sea again on 8 June, Welles conducted exercises en route to Cuban waters and subsequently operated out of Guantanamo Bay over the next few days. During this time, the ship conducted a short-range battle practice. Shifting to Cay Lobos, Bahamas, on 20 June, Welles then transported 56 men and one officer from the destroyer Crowninshield to Guantanamo, debarking the men to George E. Badger. Welles then remained at Guantanamo until she sailed for the Canal Zone on 27 July. Anchoring in Limon Bay, Canal Zone, on the 28th, Welles later transited the Panama Canal on 10 August, dropping anchor in Panama Bay on 12 August. She performed target services and conducted exercises and maneuvers with Submarine Division 11 until 16 August, when the destroyer retransmitted the canal, east-bound, and arrived at Coco Solo that day.

Welles sailed for Norfolk on 22 August with the rest of DesDiv 67, proceeded via Guantanamo Bay, and arrived six days later. At that time, Welles and 49 of her sister ships were slated to be transferred to the British government as a result of an agreement reached between President Roosevelt and the British Prime Minister, Winston Churchill.

Welles loaded service ammunition at Norfolk before she sailed for Newport, Rhode Island, where she then exchanged older torpedoes for ones of a later mark on 1 September. Welles soon shifted to the Boston Navy Yard, where she was drydocked, before she sailed—in company with Russell and Herndon on 5 September for Halifax, Nova Scotia, the designated turnover point. Arriving the next day as one of the first eight ships to be transferred, Welles soon took on board the prospective crew (six British officers and 120 enlisted men) for familiarization. Three days later, on 9 September 1940, Welles was decommissioned and turned over to the Royal Navy. Her American name was struck from the United States Navy list on 8 January 1941.

== As HMS Cameron ==
Simultaneously, the destroyer was renamed HMS Cameron (I05). Initially, the warship suffered problems with a faulty generator which delayed her sailing for the British Isles. After finally getting underway for England, the destroyer made port at Plymouth on 13 November, after a stop-over at Belfast, Northern Ireland. Cameron shifted to Portsmouth three days later, and was slated to receive her first major overhaul since coming under the White Ensign. However, she was never to finish this as, on 5 December 1940, Luftwaffe bombers struck Portsmouth while Cameron lay defenseless in drydock no. 8. A high explosive bomb severely damaged the ship, capsizing her.

Judged unsuitable for return to active sea service, Cameron was eventually refloated on 23 February 1941 and allocated for use as a hulk. United States Navy experts consequently subjected the ship to close scrutiny to derive damage control measures which could be applicable to ships of her type still in service with the Navy. As such, she presented them with what John Alden, in his book, Flush Decks and Four Pipes, termed the most extreme case of hull damage seen by Americans until Cassin and Downes were blasted by Japanese bombs at Pearl Harbor on 7 December 1941.

Admiralty records indicate that Cameron fulfilled a useful purpose. The Admiralty Committee on Shock in Ships conducted shock tests on the hulk between July 1942 and September 1943. Paid off on 5 October 1943, Cameron remained in dockyard hands at Portsmouth until towed to Falmouth, Cornwall in November 1944, where she was subsequently broken up for scrap.
