= John Webber (disambiguation) =

John Webber (1751–1793) was an English artist and explorer

John Webber may also refer to:

- John Ferdinand Webber (c. 1790–1882), Texan pioneer and conductor on the southern Underground Railroad with his wife
- John Webber Crumpacker (1908–1996), prominent US Naval officer
- John Webber (musician) (born 1965), American jazz bassist
- John Webber (politician) (1841–1904), member of the Queensland Legislative Council

== See also ==
- John Weber (disambiguation), various people
