= USS Ringgold (DD-89) =

Wickes-class destroyer

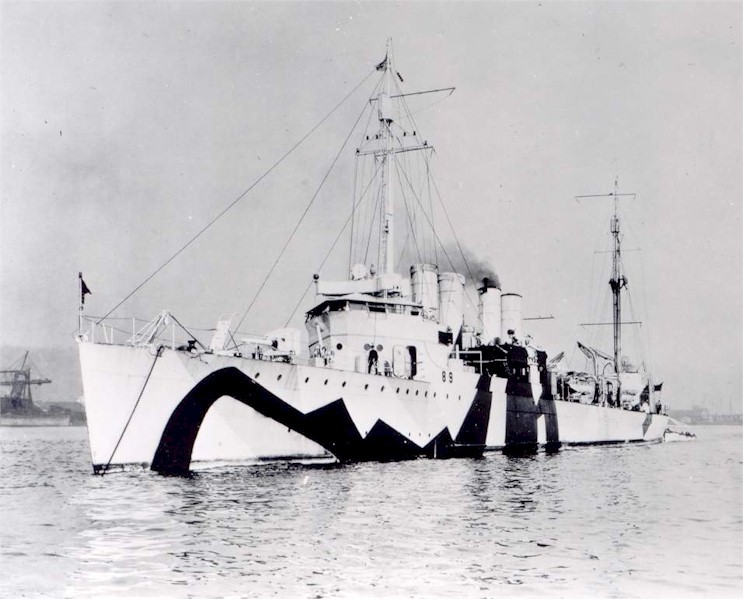
- USS Ringgold (DD-89)

History

United States
- Name: USS Ringgold
- Namesake: Cadwalader Ringgold
- Builder: Union Iron Works, San Francisco, California
- Laid down: 20 October 1917
- Launched: 14 April 1918
- Commissioned: 14 November 1918
- Decommissioned: 17 June 1922
- Recommissioned: 23 August 1940
- Stricken: 8 January 1941
- Identification: DD-89
- Fate: Transferred to UK, 26 November 1940

United Kingdom
- Name: HMS Newark
- Commissioned: 26 November 1940
- Fate: Scrapped, 18 February 1947

General characteristics
- Class & type: Wickes-class destroyer
- Displacement: 1,060 tons
- Length: 315 ft 5 in (96.14 m)
- Beam: 31 ft 8 in (9.65 m)
- Draft: 9 ft 10 in (3.00 m)
- Speed: 35 kn (65 km/h; 40 mph)
- Complement: 134 officers and enlisted
- Armament: 4 × 4 in (102 mm) guns; 2 x 1-pounder guns; 12 × 21 inch (533 mm) torpedo tubes

USS Ringgold (DD-89) was a Wickes-class destroyer in the United States Navy during World War I and the interwar period. During World War II, the vessel was transferred to the Royal Navy as a Town-class destroyer named HMS Newark, being scrapped after the end of the war in 1947.

== Construction and career ==
=== United States Navy ===
The first ship named in honor of Rear Admiral Cadwalader Ringgold, she was launched 14 April 1918 by Union Iron Works, San Francisco, sponsored by Mrs. David W. Farquhar; and commissioned 14 November 1918 at Mare Island Navy Yard.

Ringgold departed Mare Island Navy Yard 18 November 1918 to join the Destroyer Force, Atlantic Fleet. After transiting the Panama Canal, Ringgold called at Guantanamo Bay, Cuba, before arriving Hampton Roads, Virginia on 5 December 1918. She cruised along the U.S. east coast into 1922, operating generally out of Newport, Rhode Island, Ringgold put into Philadelphia Navy Yard 5 April 1922 where she was decommissioned 17 June 1922 and placed in reserve.

=== Royal Navy ===
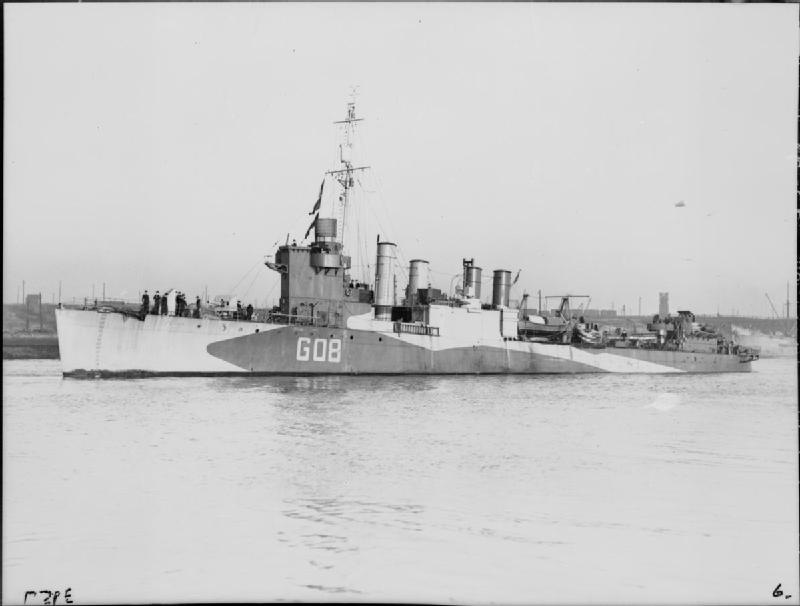
HMS Newark during World War II

After remaining inactive for almost two decades, Ringgold recommissioned 23 August 1940 preparatory to transfer to Britain along with 49 other old flush-deckers as part of the Destroyers for Bases Agreement. Ringgold was formally transferred to Britain 26 November 1940 at Halifax, Nova Scotia, and renamed HMS Newark in honor of towns in both Britain and the United States. She was struck from the U.S. Navy list 8 January 1941.

Although manned initially by a Royal Canadian Navy care and maintenance party, Newark was commissioned for Royal Navy service 5 December 1940.

Newark was damaged in collision with Newmarket 9 December 1940, necessitating repairs that delayed her departure for British waters. Standing out of Halifax 4 February 1941, in company with Wells, she encountered a heavy gale and subsequently developed engine trouble. Towed back to Halifax, Newark again departed 26 February 1941 and arrived at Belfast 5 March and Plymouth, England 9 March 1941.

Assigned to the 17th Destroyer Division, Newark participated in escort duty for the 1st Minelaying Division operating in the Irish Sea and for the Iceland ferry service. She suffered minor bomb damage in an air attack at Belfast on the night of 4–5 May 1941 but resumed active duty that August. While in company with Southern Prince 25 August 1941, Newark was hit by a torpedo forward and had to be escorted into Belfast. Newark was modified for trade convoy escort service by removal of three of the original 4"/50 caliber guns and one of the triple torpedo tube mounts to reduce topside weight for additional depth charge stowage and installation of hedgehog. Following completion of repairs in May 1942, Newark rejoined the 17th Destroyer Division. She probably damaged a German submarine 31 May 1942 while cruising south of Iceland and assisted Castleton in rescuing survivors of U-464 on 20 August 1942.

Newark was transferred to the Rosyth Escort Force during 1944, operating in the North Sea and in waters north of the British Isles on antisubmarine duty. In January 1945, she became an aircraft target ship under orders of the Rear Admiral, Northern Air Stations. Newark was scrapped at Bo'ness on 18 February 1947.
