= Crumpacker =

Crumpacker is a surname. Notable people with the surname include:

- Edgar D. Crumpacker (1851–1920), U.S. Representative from Indiana
- John Webber Crumpacker (1908–1996), U.S. Naval officer
- Jonathan W. Crumpacker (1854–1904), justice of the New Mexico Territorial Supreme Court
- Maurice E. Crumpacker (1886–1927), Republican U.S. congressman from Oregon
- Shepard J. Crumpacker Jr. (1917–1986), U.S. Representative from Indiana

== See also ==
- Maurice Crumpacker House, the former residence of Maurice E. Crumpacker
