= Eugene A. Coffin Sr. =

United States Coast Guard Rear Admiral

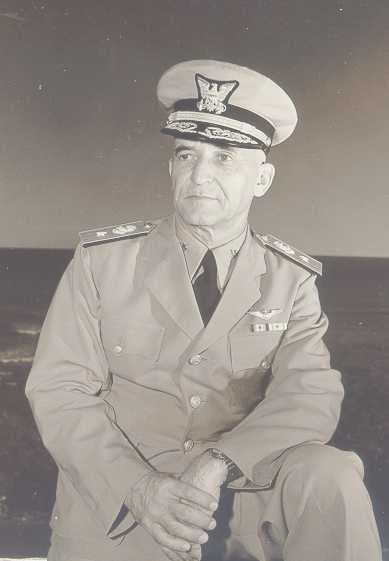
Eugene A. Coffin Sr.

Eugene Auguste Coffin Sr. (March 10, 1888 – January 20, 1972) was a Rear Admiral in the United States Coast Guard.

== Biography ==
Eugene A. Coffin was born on March 10, 1888, in Fuzhou (Foochow) China. He was the son of Dr Julia Evelynn (Sparr) Coffin and John Auguste Coffin.

He was married three times. First, to Nancy Jamison in 1911, who died in 1918 and with whom he had two sons. Second, to Peggy Powers in 1919, with whom he had two daughters. Third, to Marjorie Barber-Hite on August 28, 1948. Coffin died on January 20, 1972, and was buried at sea.

== Career ==
Coffin first joined the Coast Guard in 1907. He would be stationed out of Boston, Massachusetts, Portland, Maine, New Bern, North Carolina, New York, New York, and Milwaukee, Wisconsin in the earlier part of his career. In 1917 he became one of the Coast Guard's first six aviators. After flight training in Pensacola, Florida, Coffin was designated Naval Aviator Number 59.

During World War I he served as an executive officer and chief of staff at Rockaway Naval Air Station. From 1924 to 1928 he held command of the USS Terry (DD-25). Later he commanded the USS Welborn C. Wood (DD-195) from 1931 to 1933 and the USCGC Taney (WHEC-37) from 1936 to 1940. Coffin was given command of the Philadelphia District on December 11, 1940, and promoted to captain on May 1, 1941. Promoted to commodore, his transfer to head the Honolulu District was announced in September 1945. Coffin was promoted to rear admiral on January 4, 1948.

Coffin was awarded the Legion of Merit and the World War I Victory Medal. His retirement was effective as of April 1, 1949.
