= I49 =

I49 may refer to:

- Interstate 49
- HMS Argus (I49)
- HMCS Columbia (I49)
