= USS Shubrick (DD-268) =

Clemson-class destroyer

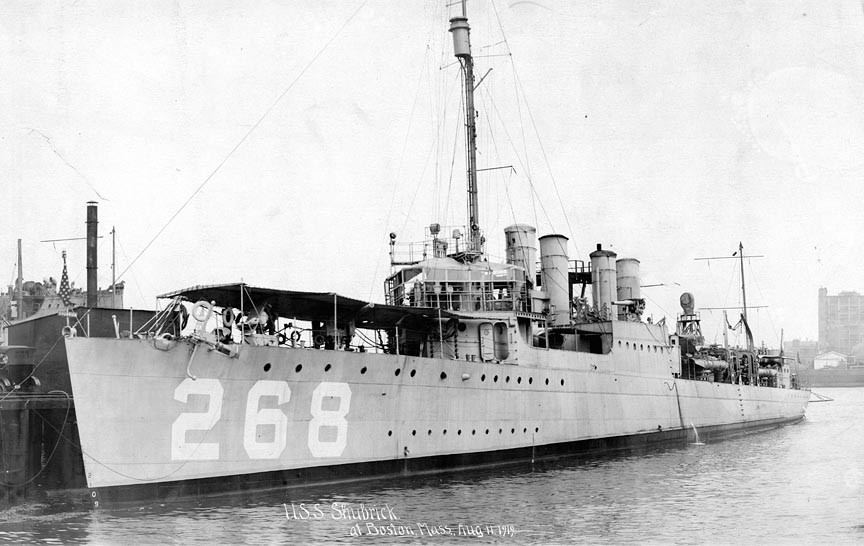
- USS Shubrick at Boston, 1919

History

United States
- Name: USS Shubrick
- Builder: Bethlehem Shipbuilding Corporation, Squantum Victory Yard
- Laid down: 3 June 1918
- Launched: 31 December 1918
- Commissioned: 3 July 1919
- Decommissioned: 26 November 1940
- Stricken: 8 January 1941
- Identification: DD-268
- Fate: Transferred to United Kingdom, 26 November 1940

United Kingdom
- Name: HMS Ripley
- Acquired: 26 November 1940
- Commissioned: 26 November 1940
- Identification: Pennant number: G79
- Fate: Sold for scrap, 20 March 1945

General characteristics
- Class & type: Clemson-class destroyer
- Displacement: 1,215 tons
- Length: 314 feet 4 1/2 inches (95.822 m)
- Beam: 30 feet 11 1/2 inches (9.436 m)
- Draft: 9 feet 4 inches (2.84 m)
- Propulsion: 26,500 shaft horsepower (19,800 kW); geared turbines, 2 screws
- Speed: 35 knots (65 km/h)
- Range: 4,900 nmi (9,100 km; 5,600 mi) at 15 kn (28 km/h; 17 mph)
- Complement: 122 officers and enlisted
- Armament: 4 × 4 in (100 mm) guns; 1 × 3 in (76 mm) gun; 12 × 21 inch (533 mm) torpedo tubes

The third USS Shubrick (DD-268) was a Clemson-class destroyer in the United States Navy. The destroyer was later transferred to the Royal Navy, where she served as HMS Ripley (G79) during World War II.

== Service history ==
=== As USS Shubrick ===
Named for William Shubrick, she was laid down on 3 June 1918 by the Bethlehem Shipbuilding Corporation, Squantum, Massachusetts; launched on 31 December 1918; sponsored by Mrs. Thomas A. Bayard, granddaughter of Rear Admiral Shubrick; and commissioned on 3 July 1919.

After shakedown out of Newport, Rhode Island, Shubrick departed New York on 27 October 1919, carrying currency and diplomatic representatives to Port-au-Prince, Haiti. After completing this mission on 31 October, she continued to the west coast, where she arrived on 27 November. On arrival at San Diego, she joined a reserve destroyer division; and, after conducting infrequent exercises off San Diego, Shubrick was decommissioned on 8 June 1922.

Shubrick was recommissioned on 18 December 1939 at San Diego, shortly after the outbreak of World War II. She refitted at Mare Island from 26 February to 16 March 1940 and departed San Diego for the Atlantic on 22 March. She was stationed in the Caribbean until 29 June, and formed part of the West Gulf Patrol from 13 to 22 May. From 2 July to 30 August, she trained Naval Reservists from Miami, Florida, Boston, Massachusetts and New York. She then underwent repairs at New York and Norfolk, Virginia and departed the latter port on 6 November for Halifax, Nova Scotia.

=== As HMS Ripley ===
She arrived at Halifax on 21 November, was decommissioned on 26 November, and simultaneously commissioned in the British Navy as HMS Ripley, a Town-class destroyer. Shubrick was struck from the Navy List on 8 January 1941. HMS Ripley was modified for trade convoy escort service by removal of three of the original 4-inch/50-caliber guns and three of the triple torpedo tube mounts to reduce topside weight for additional depth charge stowage and installation of hedgehog. Ripley was assigned to Escort Group B-7 of the Mid-Ocean Escort Force for convoy ON 142 during the winter of 1942–43 and served on North Atlantic convoy routes until placed in reserve in January 1944. She was scrapped on 20 March 1945 at Sunderland, England.
