= HMS Newmarket =

Several ships of the British Royal Navy have been named HMS Newmarket.

- HMS Newmarket (1907), an auxiliary minesweeper active during the First World War and sunk on 17 July 1917.
- HMS Newmarket (G47), a Town-class destroyer provided under lend-lease from the US Navy in 1940 and scrapped in 1945.
