= John Webber Crumpacker =

United States Navy officer

Rear Admiral John Webber Crumpacker (1908–1996) was a prominent US Naval officer.

== Biography ==
Rear Admiral Crumpacker was born in LaPorte, Indiana on 13 July 1908, the son of lawyer Harry Lewis Crumpacker and the cousin of two admirals, both named Royal Ingersoll. He was appointed to the US Naval Academy from Indiana in 1927.

His first assignment was on USS Saratoga and next he was on USS Aaron Ward and USS Evans. As an LTJG, Crumpacker switched to the Supply Corps; on completing the Finance and Supply School, he joined USS Tennessee as disbursing officer. In 1941, after a tour at NAS Anacostia, he was transferred to Samoa. His family returned to the Mainland shortly after the outbreak of War.

In 1943 he returned to become Aide to the Chief of the Bureau of Supplies and Accounts. Next duty was Supply Officer of USS Princeton, then being completed. After the War his duties included NAS Quonset, AirPac Supply Officer. Promoted to captain, he was transferred to the Washington Navy Yard. He attended Harvard Business School and the Industrial War College; completing these schools, he commanded the Navy Supply Depot, Seattle; and the General Stores Supply Office, Philadelphia.

Promoted to rear admiral in 1955, he commanded the Aviation Supply Office and Aviation Supply Depot in Philadelphia. In 1959 he became the fiscal staff assistant to the Deputy Chief of Naval Operations; he soon became Director of the Material and Budget Division of the Chief of Naval Operations. In 1961 he was appointed Chief of the Bureau of Supplies and Accounts and Paymaster General of the Navy, remaining there until 1965.

Admiral Crumpacker was a long-time member of the Club of Rome and the Bilderberg Group.

Retiring from the Navy, Admiral Crumpacker became Director of the Residence Foundation which obtained the funds and built Vinson Hall. His last formal position was as eight years as Director of the Easter Seals Treatment Center in Rockville, MD.

Crumpacker died 31 December 1996 in Aruba. Services at Fort Myer and interment with full military honors in Arlington National Cemetery were on 22 January 1997.
