= John Weber =

John Weber may refer to:

- John B. Weber (1842–1926), U.S. Representative from New York
- John Henry Weber (1779–1859), Danish-born, American fur trader and explorer
- John Weber (darts player) (born 1972), Australian darts player
- John Weber (Pennsylvania politician) (1768–1815), speaker of the Pennsylvania House of Representatives, 1810–1812
- Vin Weber (John Vincent Weber, born 1952), former Republican congressman from Minnesota

== See also ==
- John Webber (disambiguation), several people
- Jon Weber (disambiguation), several people
