= Jon Weber =

Jon Weber may refer to:

- Jon Weber (politician), member of the Idaho House of Representatives
- Jon Weber (musician) (born 1961), American jazz pianist
- Jon Weber (baseball) (born 1978), American baseball player

== See also ==
- John Weber (disambiguation)
