= USS Yarnall (DD-143) =

Wickes-class destroyer

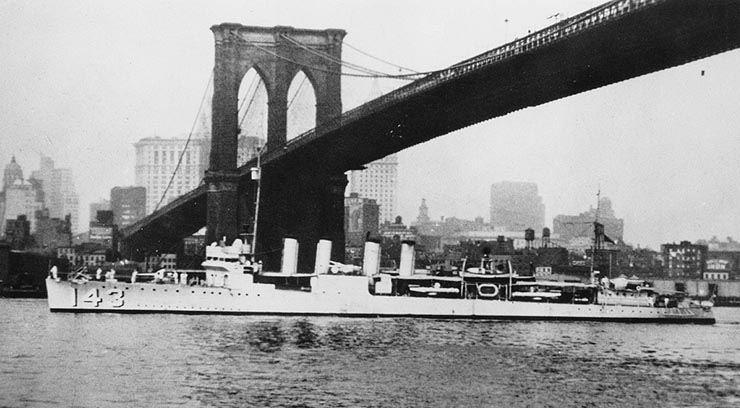
- USS Yarnall, East River, New York City

History

United States
- Name: USS Yarnall
- Builder: William Cramp & Sons, Philadelphia
- Yard number: 458
- Laid down: 12 February 1918
- Launched: 19 June 1918
- Commissioned: 29 November 1918
- Decommissioned: 29 May 1922
- Recommissioned: 19 April 1930
- Decommissioned: 30 December 1936
- Recommissioned: 4 October 1939
- Decommissioned: 23 October 1940
- Stricken: 8 January 1941
- Identification: DD-143
- Fate: Transferred to UK, 23 October 1940

United Kingdom
- Name: HMS Lincoln
- Commissioned: 23 October 1940
- Identification: Pennant number: G42
- Fate: Transferred to USSR as a parts hulk, 26 August 1944; returned by Soviet Union August 1952 and sold for scrap
- Notes: Transferred to Norway February 1942

Norway
- Name: HNoMS Lincoln
- Acquired: February 1942
- Fate: Returned to United Kingdom, 25 December 1943
- Notes: loaned to Canada July 1942; returned to United Kingdom 25 December 1943

Soviet Union
- Name: Druzhny (Friendly)
- Acquired: 26 August 1944 used as a parts hulk
- Fate: Returned to United Kingdom for scrapping, 23 August 1952
- Notes: May have been in active Soviet Navy service, 23 September 1944 to end of World War II

General characteristics
- Class & type: Wickes-class destroyer
- Displacement: 1154 tons
- Length: 314 ft 4 1/2 in (95.822 m)
- Beam: 30 ft 11 1/4 in (9.430 m)
- Draft: 9 ft 10 1/4 in (3.004 m)
- Speed: 35 kn (65 km/h; 40 mph)
- Complement: 122 officers and enlisted
- Armament: 4 × 4"/50 caliber guns, 2 × 3 in (76 mm)/23 guns, 12 × 21 inch (533 mm) torpedo tubes, 2 × .30 cal (7.62 mm) machine guns, 2 × depth charge racks

The first USS Yarnall (DD–143) was a Wickes-class destroyer in the United States Navy during World War I later transferred to the Royal Navy as HMS Lincoln, to the Royal Norwegian Navy as HNoMS Lincoln, and subsequently to the Soviet Navy as Druzhny.

== Construction and career ==
=== United States Navy service ===
Named for John Yarnall, she was laid down on 12 February 1918 at Philadelphia by William Cramp & Sons Ship & Engine Building Company. The destroyer was launched on 19 June 1918; sponsored by Mrs. Marie H. Bagley. The ship was commissioned on 29 November 1918, Commander William F. Halsey, Jr., in command.

Assigned to Division 15, Destroyer Force, Yarnall served briefly with United States naval forces in France during 1919. By 1 January 1920, her division had been reassigned to Flotilla 5, Destroyer Squadron 4, Pacific Fleet, and operated out of the San Diego destroyer base. Her division—redesignated Division 13 in February—received orders in April to proceed to the Asiatic station; but she apparently did not begin that assignment until late the following fall. Yarnall returned from the Far East to the United States late in the summer of 1921 and began repairs at Puget Sound. In December, she was reassigned to Division 11 and again operated out of San Diego until 29 May 1922 when she was decommissioned there and placed in reserve.

After almost eight years of inactivity, the destroyer was recommissioned at San Diego on 19 April 1930. Assigned initially to Division 11, Squadron 10, Battle Fleet Destroyer Squadrons, Yarnall operated briefly on the west coast before being transferred to the east coast sometime late in 1930. By New Year's Day, 1931, her home port had been changed to Charleston, South Carolina. In March, she joined the Scouting Force under the command of Lt. Comdr. Thomas R. Cooley as a unit of Destroyer Division 3 but retained Charleston as her home port. The destroyer operated out of that base until late in the summer of 1934 when, though still a unit of Scouting Force Destroyers, she returned to the west coast. Based at San Diego, the warship remained active along the California coast until late in 1936. She then returned to the east coast and, on 30 December 1936, was placed out of commission at Philadelphia and berthed there with the reserve fleet.

As a part of President Franklin D. Roosevelt's program to bolster the minuscule Atlantic Squadron after war broke out in Europe in September 1939, Yarnall ended her 21-month, second retirement on 4 October 1939 when she was recommissioned at Philadelphia. She became a unit of Destroyer Squadron 11 of the Atlantic Squadron, the small fleet assigned the enormous task of keeping war out of the western hemisphere. She operated out of Norfolk in the Neutrality Patrol until the fall of 1940 when the United States concluded the destroyers-for-bases deal with the United Kingdom. Yarnall was stricken from the United States Navy list on 8 January 1941 — soon after her transfer to the Royal Navy.

=== Royal Navy service ===
Yarnall was one of the 50 elderly destroyers chosen to be transferred to the Royal Navy in return for the right to establish American bases on British territory in the western hemisphere. She sailed to St. John's, Newfoundland, where she was decommissioned by the United States Navy on 23 October 1940; and, that same day, the Royal Navy commissioned her as Town-class destroyer HMS Lincoln with the pennant number G42.

The veteran destroyer departed St. John's on 3 November and arrived in Belfast, Northern Ireland, on 9 November. Lincoln moved from there to Londonderry Port where she was assigned to the First Escort Group, Western Approaches Command. For almost a year, she met troop transport and cargo convoys in mid-ocean and escorted them into ports in the British Isles. Between September 1941 and February 1942, the destroyer was refitted at Woolwich Dockyard. Lincoln was modified for trade convoy escort service by removal of three of the original 4"/50 caliber guns and one of the triple torpedo tube mounts to reduce topside weight for additional depth charge stowage and installation of Hedgehog.

=== Royal Norwegian Navy service ===
After the refit, she was transferred to the exiled Royal Norwegian Navy as HNoMS Lincoln and served with the Western Local Escort Force, operating along the Newfoundland coast between Halifax, Nova Scotia and St. John's. In July 1942, HNoMS Lincoln was loaned to the Royal Canadian Navy, though remaining under Norwegian colours. Her duty in Canadian waters continued until the end of 1943, when she returned to Britain departing Halifax on 19 December and arriving back in Londonderry Port on Christmas Day. Early in 1944, the venerable warship was placed in reserve in the River Tyne. Her service to the Allied cause, however, had not quite ended.

=== Soviet Navy service ===
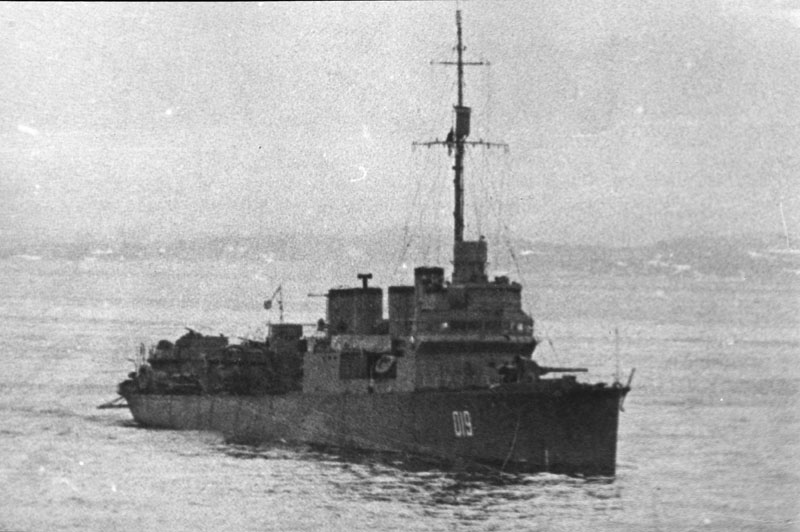
Druzhny, c.1944-1952

On 26 August 1944, she was transferred to the Soviet Navy and renamed Druzhny (rus. Дружный, "Friendly"). There is some disagreement on her career in the Soviet Navy. Western sources indicate she was cannibalized to provide spare parts for eight sister ships provided to the Soviet Union in late 1944; one Russian source indicates she was used on active duty from 23 September 1944 until the end of the war, and was returned in August 1952 to Britain where she was sold for scrap.
