= USS Edwards (DD-265) =

Clemson-class destroyer

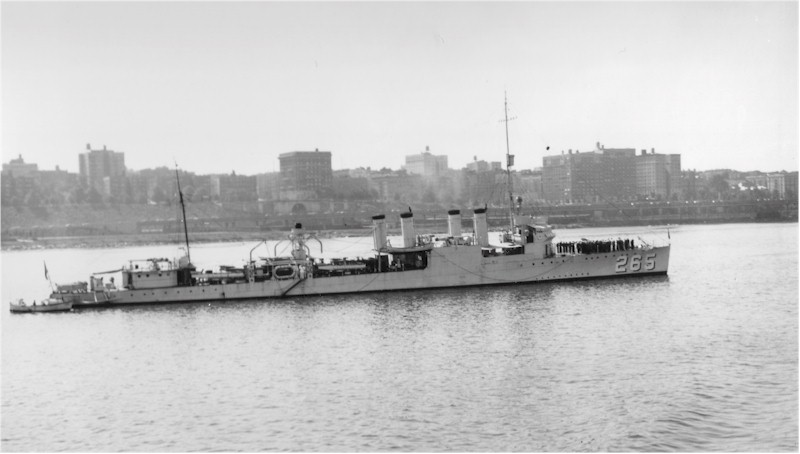

History

United States
- Name: USS Edwards
- Namesake: William W. Edwards
- Builder: Bethlehem Shipbuilding Corporation, Squantum Victory Yard
- Laid down: 3 June 1918
- Launched: 10 October 1918
- Commissioned: 24 April 1919
- Decommissioned: 8 October 1940
- Stricken: 8 January 1941
- Identification: DD-265
- Fate: Transferred to U.K., 8 October 1940

United Kingdom
- Name: HMS Buxton
- Acquired: 8 October 1940
- Commissioned: 8 October 1940
- Identification: H96
- Honours and awards: Atlantic 1941-42
- Fate: Transferred to Canada, August 1942

Canada
- Name: HMCS Buxton
- Acquired: August 1942
- Identification: Pennant number: H96
- Honours and awards: Atlantic 1942-43
- Fate: Sold for scrap, 21 March 1946

General characteristics
- Class & type: Clemson-class destroyer
- Displacement: 1,215 tons
- Length: 314 ft 4 in (95.81 m)
- Beam: 31 ft 8 in (9.65 m)
- Draft: 9 ft 3 in (2.82 m)
- Propulsion: 26,500 shp (19.8 MW); geared turbines, 2 screws
- Speed: 35 kn (65 km/h; 40 mph)
- Range: 4,900 nmi (9,100 km; 5,600 mi) at 15 kn (28 km/h; 17 mph)
- Complement: 120 officers and enlisted
- Armament: 4 × 4"/50 caliber guns, 1 × 3 in (76 mm)/23 gun, 12 × 21 inch (533 mm) torpedo tubes

USS Edwards (DD-265) was a Clemson-class destroyer in the United States Navy and transferred to the Royal Navy where she served as HMS Buxton (H96) and later in the Royal Canadian Navy during World War II.

== Namesake ==
William W. Edwards was born c. 1790 in Petersburg, Virginia. He was appointed a midshipman on 1 September 1811. In 1813 he was assigned to USS Argus and was killed in the action with HMS Pelican on 14 August 1813.

== Service history ==
=== United States Navy ===
Edwards was launched 10 October 1918 by Bethlehem Shipbuilding Corporation, Squantum, Massachusetts; sponsored by Miss Julia Edwards Noyes, whose great-grandfather was the uncle of Midshipman Edwards; and commissioned 24 April 1919 at Boston Navy Yard.

In May 1919 Edwards carried spare parts for airplanes and seaplanes to St. John's, Newfoundland, as reserves for the historic first transatlantic seaplane flight made by Navy planes. She sailed from Boston, Massachusetts 28 May to report to Commander, U.S. Naval Forces in Europe, for duty with the Food Administration. Arriving at Gibraltar in June, she took part in escorting the naval transport George Washington carrying President Woodrow Wilson into Brest, then visited England and Germany before returning to the United States on 25 August.

Assigned to the Pacific Fleet, Edwards sailed from New York on 17 September 1919 and arrived at the destroyer base at San Diego, California on 13 October where she was placed in reduced commission with a partial complement 1 November 1919. In February 1920 she moved to Puget Sound Navy Yard, but returned to San Diego a year later where she remained in reserve, occasionally putting to sea for target practice. She was placed out of commission 8 June 1922.

Recommissioned 18 December 1939, Edwards was assigned to the Neutrality Patrol, and after overhaul, left the west coast 22 March for Galveston, Texas. She patrolled the Gulf and east coast until fall, then sailed to Halifax, Nova Scotia, where she was decommissioned 8 October 1940, and delivered to the British government as one of the destroyers exchanged for bases.

=== World War II ===
Commissioned in the Royal Navy 8 October 1940 as HMS Buxton (H96) for service in the third "Town" Flotilla, the destroyer served in Canadian waters briefly as the U-boat war intensified; she was then allocated to 6th Escort Group, Western Approaches Command, for the vital duty of keeping the supply line open to Britain. Buxton was modified for trade convoy escort service by removal of three of the original 4"/50 caliber guns and one of the triple torpedo tube mounts to reduce topside weight for additional depth charge stowage and installation of hedgehog. In August 1942, when newer escorts were available, she was transferred to the Royal Canadian Navy as HMCS Buxton, assigned to the Western Local Escort Force (WLEF) based at Halifax. After undergoing refit in Boston from December 1942 to March 1943 she rejoined the WLEF in April, 1943. She was withdrawn from service that August and used as a static training ship at Halifax and then Digby, Nova Scotia, until the end of 1944. She was finally paid off early in 1945.
