= USS Bailey (DD-269) =

Clemson-class destroyer

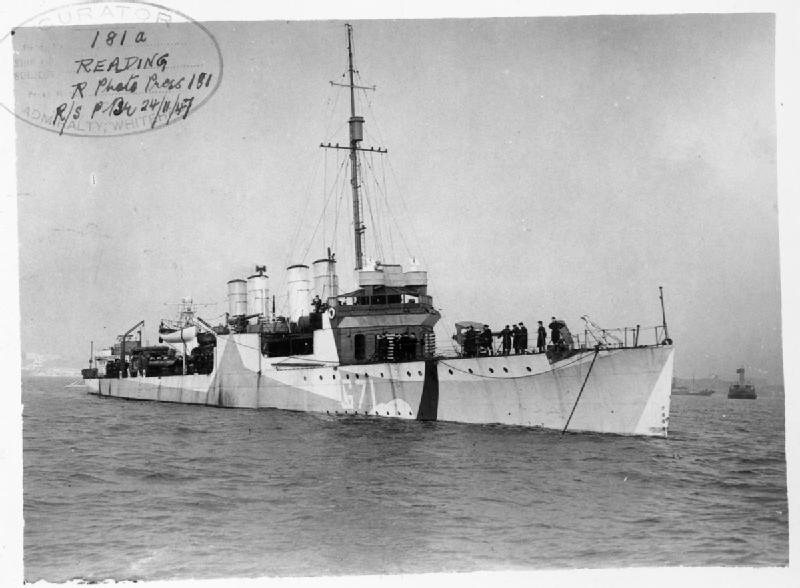
- USS Bailey as HMS Reading with the Royal Navy in World War II

History

United States
- Name: USS Bailey
- Namesake: Theodorus Bailey
- Builder: Bethlehem Shipbuilding Corporation, Squantum Victory Yard
- Cost: $1,222,538.64 (hull and machinery)
- Laid down: 3 June 1918
- Launched: 5 February 1919
- Commissioned: 27 June 1919
- Decommissioned: 26 November 1940
- Stricken: 8 January 1941
- Identification: DD-269
- Fate: Transferred to the United Kingdom, 26 November 1940

United Kingdom
- Name: HMS Reading
- Acquired: 26 November 1940
- Identification: Pennant number: G71
- Fate: Sold for scrap, July 1945

General characteristics
- Class & type: Clemson-class destroyer
- Displacement: 1,215 tons
- Length: 314 ft 4 in (95.81 m)
- Beam: 31 ft 8 in (9.65 m)
- Draft: 9 ft 10 in (3.00 m)
- Propulsion: 26,500 shp (19,800 kW); geared turbines, 2 screws
- Speed: 35 kn (65 km/h; 40 mph)
- Range: 4,900 nmi (9,100 km; 5,600 mi) at 15 kn (28 km/h; 17 mph)
- Complement: 122 officers and enlisted
- Armament: 4 × 4 in (100 mm) guns; 1 × 3 in (76 mm) gun; 12 × 21 inch (533 mm) torpedo tubes

The second USS Bailey (DD-269) was a Clemson-class destroyer in the United States Navy and transferred to the Royal Navy where she served as HMS Reading (G71) during World War II.

== Service history ==
=== As USS Bailey ===
Named for Theodorus Bailey, she was launched in February 1919 by Bethlehem Shipbuilding Corporation, Squantum, Massachusetts; sponsored by Miss Rosalie Fellows Bailey, great-granddaughter of Admiral Bailey, commissioned 27 June 1919 and reported to the Pacific Fleet.

Bailey carried out routine operations along the west coast between October 1919 and June 1922. Because of the disturbed conditions on the west coast of Mexico she was assigned to patrol duty there for short periods in 1920. On 16 June 1922 Bailey went out of commission at San Diego, California.

On 30 September 1939 she was recommissioned at San Diego and reported to Destroyer Division 72, Atlantic Squadron. Bailey served with the Squadron in operations off the eastern seaboard until November 1940. On 26 November 1940 she was decommissioned at Halifax, Nova Scotia, and transferred in the destroyer-land bases exchange to Great Britain.

=== As HMS Reading ===
Renamed HMS Reading she was commissioned 26 November 1940 for service with the 5th "Town" Flotilla and arrived at Plymouth, England, 17 December 1940 where she was re-fitted and modified at HMNB Devonport.

Between March and July 1941 she escorted convoys in the Atlantic, working out of Liverpool. In July 1941 she joined the Newfoundland Escort Group with which she remained until May 1942. In this role, she escorted the battleship HMS Prince of Wales with Prime Minister Winston Churchill to the Newfoundland Conference. She was deployed at Placentia Bay with other Royal Navy and United States Navy warships for guard duties during the conference. After the meeting, she temporarily resumed escort duties in the Atlantic.

Between May and October 1942 she underwent a yard overhaul in London, after which her weaponry was removed and she served as a target ship for aircraft from the Air Station, Fearn, Scotland, and continued in this assignment until July 1945 when she was handed over to ship-breakers at Rosyth. The ship's badge from HMS Reading is in the collection of the Historical Society of Berks County, located in Reading, PA.
