= USS Hale (DD-133) =

Wickes-class destroyer

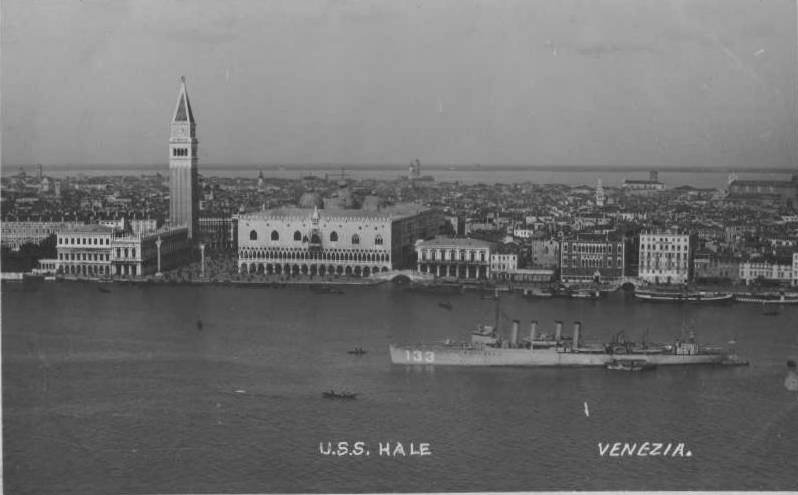
- USS Hale at Venice, Italy in 1919

History

United States
- Name: USS Hale
- Namesake: Eugene Hale
- Builder: Bath Iron Works
- Laid down: 7 October 1918
- Launched: 29 May 1919
- Commissioned: 12 June 1919
- Decommissioned: 22 June 1922
- Recommissioned: 1 May 1930
- Decommissioned: 9 April 1937
- Recommissioned: 30 September 1939
- Decommissioned: 9 September 1940
- Stricken: 8 January 1941
- Identification: DD-133
- Fate: Transferred to UK, 9 September 1940

United Kingdom
- Name: HMS Caldwell
- Acquired: 9 September 1940
- Identification: Pennant number:I20
- Fate: Scrapped, September 1944
- Notes: In Royal Canadian Navy service mid-1942 to 1 December 1943

Canada
- Name: Caldwell
- Acquired: mid-1942
- Fate: Returned to United Kingdom, 1 December 1943

General characteristics
- Class & type: Wickes-class destroyer
- Displacement: 1,090 tons
- Length: 314 ft 5 in (95.83 m)
- Beam: 31 ft 8 in (9.65 m)
- Draft: 8 ft 8 in (2.64 m)
- Speed: 35 kn (65 km/h; 40 mph)
- Complement: 113 officers and enlisted
- Armament: 4 × 4 in (102 mm)/50 guns; 2 × 3 in (76 mm)/23 guns; 12 × 21 inch (533 mm) torpedo tubes

The first USS Hale (DD–133) was a Wickes-class destroyer in the United States Navy during World War I, later transferred to the Royal Navy as HMS Caldwell (I20). She was named for Senator Eugene Hale.

== Construction and career ==
=== United States Navy ===
Hale was launched by the Bath Iron Works, Bath, Maine on 29 May 1919; sponsored by Miss Mary Hale, granddaughter of Senator Hale. The ship was commissioned at Boston on 12 June 1919.

Hale joined Destroyer Squadron 3, U.S. Atlantic Fleet, and after training exercises departed 11 July 1919 for Europe. On this cruise, the ship paid goodwill visits to European and Mediterranean ports, assisted in the execution of the Austrian Armistice in October, and joined the American detachment in Turkish waters. Hale then carried refugees, relief officials, and freight between the ports of Greece, Bulgaria, and Russia, showing the flag in the vital Mediterranean and Balkan area. She returned to Philadelphia, Pennsylvania on 31 March 1920 and resumed her schedule of training and development exercises along the Eastern Coast. Hale decommissioned at Philadelphia on 22 June 1922 and remained in reserve until 1 May 1930, when she re-commissioned.

Departing Philadelphia on 15 May, Hale took part in refresher training operations and then resumed readiness exercises on the East Coast. She participated in Scouting Fleet maneuvers in early 1931 in the Caribbean, and arrived at San Diego, California via the Panama Canal 4 April 1931. For the next few years Hale participated in maneuvers with the Battle Force along the California coast and spent much time perfecting the techniques of modern aircraft carrier tactics with carriers Saratoga and Lexington. The destroyer decommissioned once more at San Diego on 9 April 1937.

Hale recommissioned at San Diego on 30 September 1939, at a time of mounting crisis in both oceans, and departed on 25 November for Neutrality Patrol in the Caribbean. Her base was changed to Galveston, Texas on 22 February 1940, and later to Key West, but the ship continued to patrol the Caribbean Sea and Gulf of Mexico. At Philadelphia on 1 September 1940 she prepared for transfer to Great Britain as a part of the Destroyers for Bases Agreement. She arrived at Halifax 6 September 1940 and decommissioned 3 days later. Entering the Royal Navy, she became HMS Caldwell (I20).

=== Royal Navy and Royal Canadian Navy ===
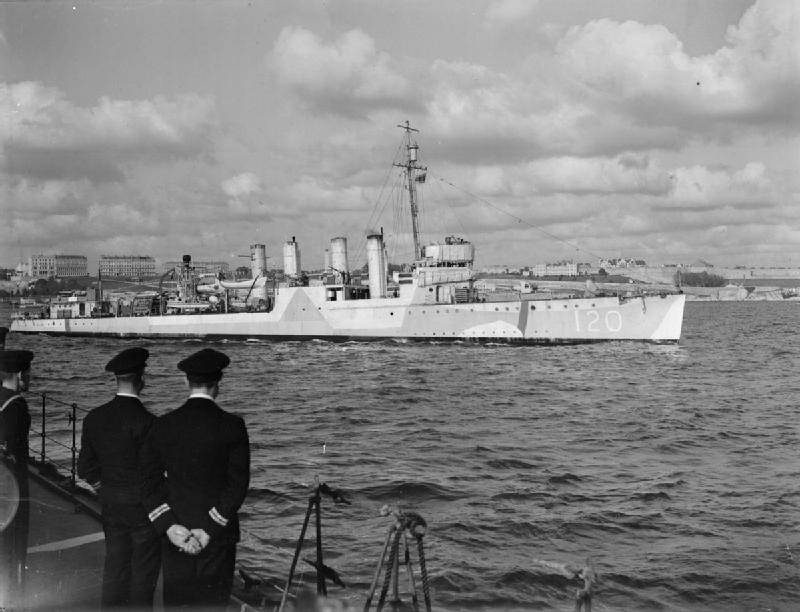
HMS Caldwell in Royal Navy service

During her career in the British Navy, HMS Caldwell was assigned to escort duty in the Atlantic and later in the Caribbean, as Britain tried desperately to cope with the German U-boat menace. She joined the Royal Canadian Navy in mid-1942 as HMCS Caldwell, and while returning to St. John's, Newfoundland, 18 December 1942, was seriously damaged during a heavy gale. She became disabled, and was found drifting helplessly by Wanderer 21 December. Caldwell was then towed to St. John's and later to Boston. Ready for sea again in May 1943, the ship resumed convoy duty with the Royal Canadian Navy until 1 December, when she returned to Tyne and was placed in reserve. She was broken up for scrap in September 1944.
