= USS Haraden (DD-183) =

Wickes-class destroyer

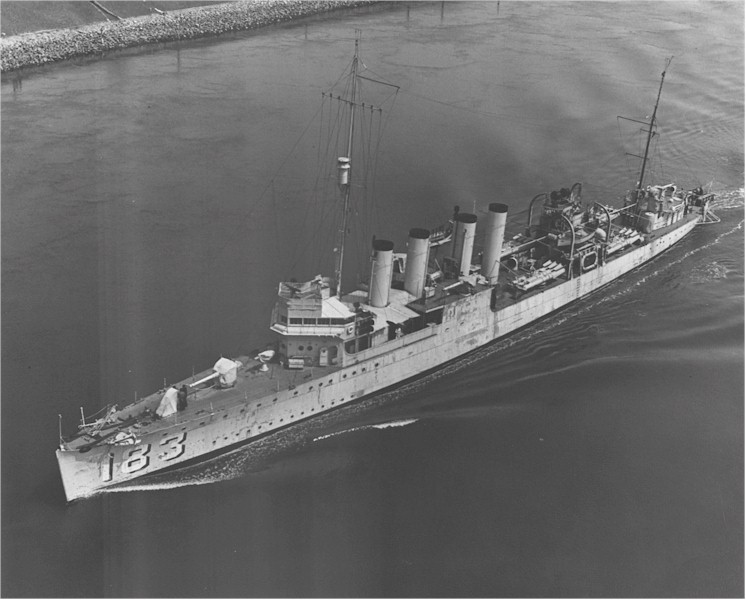
- USS Haraden (DD-183)

History

United States
- Name: USS Haraden
- Namesake: Jonathan Haraden
- Builder: Newport News Shipbuilding
- Laid down: 30 March 1918
- Launched: 4 July 1918
- Commissioned: 7 June 1919
- Decommissioned: 17 July 1922
- Recommissioned: 4 December 1939
- Decommissioned: 24 September 1940
- Identification: DD-183
- Fate: Transferred to UK, 24 September 1940

Canada
- Name: HMCS Columbia
- Namesake: Columbia River
- Commissioned: 24 September 1940
- Identification: Pennant number: I49
- Honours and awards: Atlantic 1940-44
- Fate: Scrapped, August 1945

General characteristics
- Class & type: Wickes-class destroyer
- Displacement: 1,060 tons
- Length: 314 ft 5 in (95.83 m)
- Beam: 31 ft 8 in (9.65 m)
- Draft: 8 ft 6 in (2.59 m)
- Speed: 35 kn (65 km/h; 40 mph)
- Complement: 101 officers and enlisted
- Armament: 4 × 4 in (102 mm)/50 guns; 1 × 3 in (76 mm)/23 guns; 12 × 21 inch (533 mm) torpedo tubes

The first USS Haraden (DD–183) was a Wickes-class destroyer in the United States Navy in the period following World War I. She was later transferred to the Royal Canadian Navy as HMCS Columbia, as a Town-class destroyer.

== Construction and career ==
=== United States Navy ===
Named for Jonathan Haraden, she was launched by Newport News Shipbuilding and Dry Dock Company, Newport News, Virginia on 4 July 1918; sponsored by Miss Mabel B. Stephens, great-niece of Captain Jonathan Haraden. Haraden was commissioned at Norfolk Navy Yard on 7 June 1919.

Haraden was assigned to U.S. Naval Forces in European Waters; after calling at Newport, Rhode Island for supplies she departed New York 30 June 1919 for duty in the Adriatic Sea. She arrived at Split, (then Kingdom of Serbs, Croats and Slovenes, now Croatia), on 28 July 1919 and conducted operations from that port assisting the naval force in the execution of the terms of the Austrian armistice, serving as station ship at Trieste and Rijeka, and participating in maneuvers. This duty occupied her until 23 October 1919, when she departed for Norfolk, Virginia, arriving on 18 November.

The destroyer departed Norfolk on 7 April 1920 for Charleston, South Carolina, and operated with reserve destroyer divisions out of Charleston until 15 March 1921. After an extensive overhaul at New York, ending on 2 May, Haraden sailed for Newport and training operations off New England. She returned to Charleston on 12 October 1921 and to Philadelphia on 10 April 1922. Haraden decommissioned 17 July 1922.

With the mounting tensions in 1939, Haraden was called back to active service and recommissioned at Philadelphia 4 December 1939. After shakedown training at Guantanamo Bay, Cuba, the destroyer performed neutrality patrol in Cuban waters briefly and then returned to Newport, 6 March 1940. She subsequently conducted neutrality patrol in waters off Block Island and Nantucket Shoals, and made three training cruises in Chesapeake Bay.

Arriving Boston Navy Yard 7 September 1940, Haraden was one of the fifty over-age destroyers to be sent to the United Kingdom in exchange for bases. She sailed on 18 September for Halifax, Nova Scotia, and decommissioned there for transfer to the British on 24 September 1940. Her name was struck from the Navy List 8 January 1941.

=== Royal Canadian Navy ===
Assigned to Canada and renamed HMCS Columbia following the Canadian practice of naming destroyers after Canadian rivers (but with deference to the U.S. origin), after the Columbia River originating in British Columbia and flowing into Washington and thence along the Oregon border. Columbia first underwent refit and then was assigned to convoy duties in the Atlantic. Her first major action began 15 October 1941 when she joined convoy SC 48, already under submarine attack. Columbia, and the other escorts fought valiantly, but nine merchantmen from the convoy were sunk before reaching England. After the U.S.'s entry into the war Columbia was reassigned to convoy ships from New York to St. John's, Newfoundland, the first leg of the transatlantic journey. She escorted convoys and performed anti-submarine patrol until 25 February 1944, when she struck a cliff in foul weather off the coast of Newfoundland. Columbia was not fully repaired after the accident but made watertight and used as a fuel and ammunition hulk in Nova Scotia until her return to the War Assets Administration for disposal in August 1945 when she was sold for scrapping.
