= Royal Ingersoll =

Royal Ingersoll may refer to:

- Royal R. Ingersoll (1847–1931), Rear Admiral, U.S. Navy
- Royal E. Ingersoll (1883–1976), Admiral, U.S. Navy
- Royal R. Ingersoll II (1913–1942), Lieutenant, U.S. Navy
