= USS Evans (DD-78) =

Wickes-class destroyer

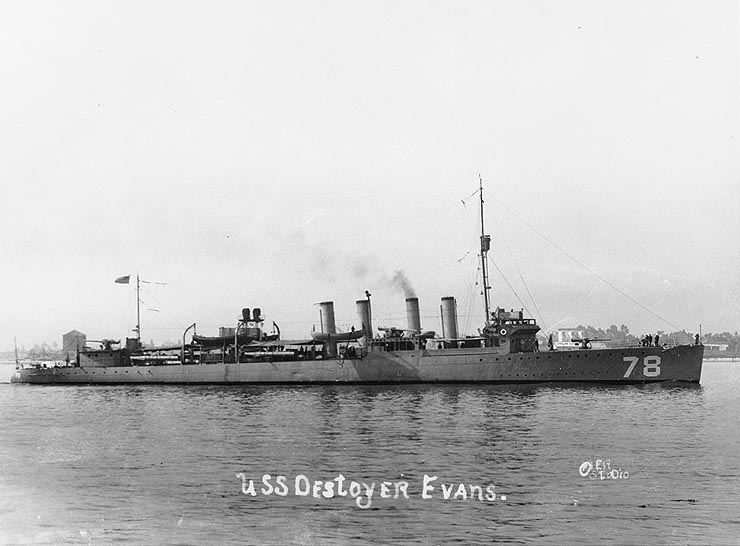
- USS Evans (DD-78)

History

United States
- Name: USS Evans
- Builder: Bath Iron Works
- Laid down: 28 December 1917
- Launched: 30 October 1918
- Commissioned: 11 November 1918
- Decommissioned: 29 May 1922
- Recommissioned: 1 April 1930
- Decommissioned: 31 March 1937
- Recommissioned: 30 September 1939
- Fate: Transferred to United Kingdom 23 October 1940

United Kingdom
- Name: HMS Mansfield
- Commissioned: 23 October 1940
- Fate: Loaned to Royal Norwegian Navy December 1940; Returned to Royal Navy March 1942

Norway
- Name: HNoMS Mansfield
- Acquired: December 1940
- Fate: Returned to Royal Navy March 1942

General characteristics
- Class & type: Wickes-class destroyer
- Displacement: 1,090 tons
- Length: 315 ft 5 in (96.14 m)
- Beam: 31 ft 8 in (9.65 m)
- Draft: 9 ft (2.7 m)
- Speed: 32 kn (59 km/h; 37 mph)
- Complement: 100 officers and enlisted
- Armament: 4 x 4-inch/50-caliber guns; 12 x 21-inch (533 mm) torpedo tubes

The first USS Evans (DD–78) was a Wickes-class destroyer in the United States Navy during World War I, later transferred to the Royal Navy as HMS Mansfield.

== Construction and career ==
=== United States Navy ===
Named for Robley Dunglison Evans, she was launched on 30 October 1918 by Bath Iron Works, Bath, Maine; sponsored by Mrs. D. N. Sewell, granddaughter of Rear Admiral Evans. The ship was commissioned on 11 November 1918.

After a training and outfitting period which included a maiden voyage to the Azores, Evans departed Newport, Rhode Island on 10 June 1919 for European waters, where she operated until 22 August, returning then to New York. She sailed once more on 11 September, and after patrolling off Central America, reached her assigned home port, San Diego, on 14 November.

Through the next two years, Evans joined in a training schedule which found her ranging the eastern Pacific from Valparaíso, Chile, to Astoria, Oregon. She was placed in reserve at San Diego 6 October 1921, and decommissioned on 29 May 1922. Recommissioned on 1 April 1930, she operated out of San Diego for six months, then was assigned to duty training members of the naval reserve out of New York City, where she arrived 6 December 1930. She returned to San Diego 26 March 1932, to sail with the Battle Fleet on training cruises and in exercises along the west coast and in Hawaiian and Alaskan waters.

Once more out of commission from 31 March 1937 to 30 September 1939, Evans arrived at Key West on 11 December 1939 for neutrality patrol duty in the Antilles, and exercises in various parts of the Caribbean. On 24 September 1940, she sailed from Key West for Halifax, Nova Scotia, where she was decommissioned 23 October 1940, and transferred to the Royal Navy in the land bases for destroyers exchange.

=== Royal Navy and Royal Norwegian Navy service ===
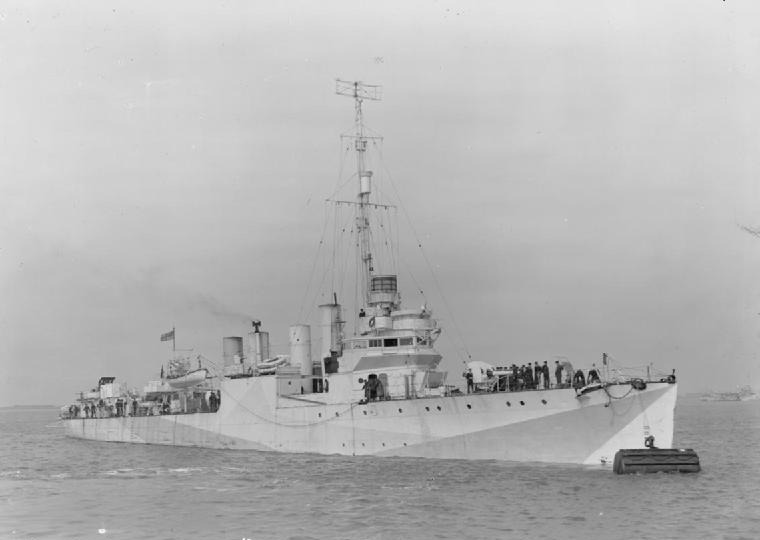
HMS Mansfield at a buoy on the Medway, August 1942

Commissioned as HMS Mansfield, a Town-class destroyer, the destroyer had a truly international career, for between December 1940 and March 1942; she was on loan to the exiled Royal Norwegian Navy. As HNoMS Mansfield, she raided a fish oil factory in German hands at Øksfjord near Hammerfest, Norway. Her landing party destroyed the factory's essential machinery, and attempted to capture the local quisling leader, but he escaped. With her Norwegian crew, she also served on escort duty in the North Atlantic, continuing in this vital assignment after she returned to the Royal Navy. Mansfield was modified for trade convoy escort service by removal of three of the original 4-inch/50-caliber guns and one of the triple torpedo tube mounts to reduce topside weight for additional depth charge stowage and installation of hedgehog. In March 1942 she was transferred to the Royal Canadian Navy operationally, but never commissioned, and served with the Western Local Escort Force based at Halifax and St. John's. With newer escorts available, in November 1943 the veteran of service in four navies was reduced to care and maintenance service at Halifax, and on 22 June 1944 she was paid off (decommissioned).

Her bell, still lettered USS Evans, is preserved at the Naval Museum of Halifax in Halifax, Nova Scotia.
