= John Webber (politician) =

Australian politician

The Hon John Webber

Member of the Queensland Legislative Council
- In office 9 May 1899 – 12 March 1904

Personal details
- Born: John Webber; 1841 Kingsbrompton, Somerset, England
- Died: 1904 (aged 62–63) Brisbane, Queensland, Australia
- Resting place: Toowong Cemetery, later Thargomindah
- Spouse: Henrietta Wills (m.1869 d.1896)

John Webber (1841 – 12 March 1904) was an Australian politician. He was a member of the Queensland Legislative Council.

== Early life ==
Webber was born in Kingsbrompton, Somerset, in 1841 to Thomas Webber and his wife Ann (née Burston). Webber married Henrietta Wells, in 1869 in Wanganella, New South Wales.

== Politics ==
Webber was a member of the Bulloo Divisional Board, the Rabbit Board, and from May 1899 till his death a member of the Queensland Legislative Council.

== Later life ==
Webber died on 12 March 1904 at St Helen's Private Hospital in Brisbane, following a long illness.., and was buried in Toowong Cemetery but later exhumed for burial in Thargomindah with his wife.
