= USS Welborn C. Wood =

Clemson-class destroyer

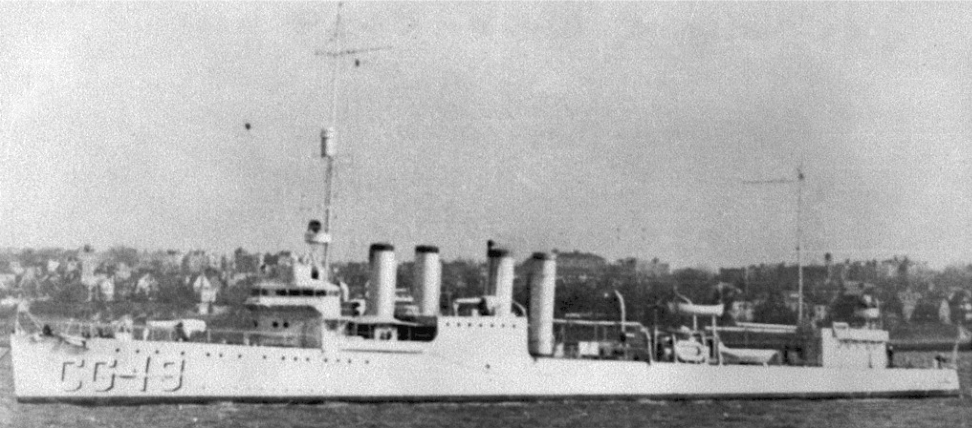

History

United States
- Name: Welborn C. Wood
- Namesake: Welborn C. Wood
- Builder: Newport News Shipbuilding & Dry Dock Company
- Laid down: 24 September 1918
- Launched: 6 March 1920
- Commissioned: 14 January 1921
- Decommissioned: 8 August 1922
- Stricken: 1 October 1930
- Fate: Transferred to the US Coast Guard

United States
- Name: USCGD Wood
- Commissioned: 15 April 1931
- Decommissioned: 21 May 1934

United States
- Commissioned: 4 September 1939
- Decommissioned: 9 September 1940

United Kingdom
- Name: HMS Chesterfield
- Commissioned: 9 September 1940
- Decommissioned: 17 January 1945
- Identification: Pennant number: I28
- Fate: Scrapped, 1948

General characteristics
- Class & type: Clemson-class destroyer
- Displacement: 1,215 tons
- Length: 314 ft 4 1/2 in (95.82 m)
- Beam: 30 ft 11 1/2 in (9.436 m)
- Draft: 9 ft 4 in (2.84 m)
- Propulsion: geared turbines
- Speed: 35 kn (65 km/h)
- Complement: 111 officers and enlisted
- Armament: 4 × 4 in (100 mm) guns, 3 × 3 in (76 mm) guns, 1 × .30 cal (7.62 mm) machine gun, 12 × 21 inch (533 mm) torpedo tubes.

USS Welborn C. Wood (DD-195) was a Clemson-class destroyer in the United States Navy during World War II. She served with the United States Coast Guard as USCGD Wood. She was later transferred to the Royal Navy as HMS Chesterfield.

== Namesake ==
Welborn Cicero Wood was born on 15 January 1876 in Georgia. He was appointed to the United States Naval Academy on 6 September 1895. He served as a midshipman on the battleship USS Texas during the Spanish–American War, before graduating with the class of 1899. He later joined USS Oregon on the Asiatic Squadron to serve part of the two years required by law before commissioning.

Subsequently, he was given command of the gunboat USS Urdaneta, then operating in the Philippines during the Philippine–American War. Naval Cadet Wood was killed in action on 17 September 1899, when his ship ran aground in the Orani River, near Manila, and was overwhelmed by insurgent troops who enfiladed the gunboat with a withering fire from the shoreline.

== As USS Welborn C. Wood ==
Welborn C. Wood was laid down on 24 September 1918 at Newport News, Virginia, by the Newport News Shipbuilding & Dry Dock Company; launched on 6 March 1920; sponsored by Miss Virginia Mary Tate; designated DD-195 during the assignment of alphanumeric hull number designations on 17 July 1920; and commissioned at the Norfolk Navy Yard on 14 January 1921.

Welborn C. Wood operated off the eastern seaboard with the Atlantic Fleet, on a routine schedule of exercises and maneuvers until decommissioned at Philadelphia on 8 August 1922.

== As USCGD Wood ==
During the 1920s Prohibition gave rise to smuggling of illicit liquor into the United States. In an attempt to deal with this problem, 25 older destroyers were transferred by the Navy to the Treasury Department for service with the Coast Guard to try to enforce a complete Prohibition. Some began to show signs of wear and tear after the often arduous pace of operations on the Rum Patrol and required replacement. Accordingly, five of the newer "flush deck" destroyers were transferred to the Treasury Department in 1930 and 1931.

Welborn C. Wood was transferred to the Coast Guard on 1 October 1930 and was simultaneously struck from the Navy list. Reconditioned and commissioned, on 15 April 1931, at Philadelphia, the destroyer was renumbered CG-19. She arrived at her permanent station, New London, Connecticut, a week later to operate on the Rum Patrol. Shifting south to Florida waters for target practice soon thereafter, she returned to New London upon the conclusion of her exercises and operated out of that port into the autumn of 1932.

After another period of routine patrols off the eastern seaboard, she operated with the Navy in Cuban waters, off Nueva Gerona, in September and October 1933, interrupting her scheduled target practices. Released from this duty on 6 November, she sailed north for New York that day, followed by a brief period in New London. The repeal of Prohibition in late 1933 obviated the need for the destroyer's law enforcement duty, and Welborn C. Wood was decommissioned once more at Philadelphia on 21 May 1934.

== Back in the Navy ==
While the warship lay in reserve, she was reinstated on the Navy list with many of her sisters in Philadelphia's reserve basin as the world situation slowly worsened. On 1 September 1939, German forces invaded Poland, triggering treaty obligations for France and the UK and hence a casus belli for the Second World War.

President Franklin D. Roosevelt swiftly ordered a Neutrality Patrol to sea, ostensibly to safeguard American coastlines. The Atlantic Squadron found itself hard pressed to meet the initial demands of the patrol and required additional ships. Accordingly, 77 light minelayers and destroyers on both coasts (San Diego and Philadelphia) were recommissioned for duty on the Neutrality Patrol to augment the units already at sea.

On 4 September 1939, Welborn C. Wood was recommissioned at Philadelphia. She was fitted out for sea and soon sailed to join the Neutrality Patrol. The destroyer conducted these operations interspersed with accelerated training evolutions off the eastern seaboard and into the Caribbean and gulf regions.

British destroyer forces had suffered heavily since the outbreak of war and urgently needed reinforcement. Accordingly, British Prime Minister Winston Churchill approached President Roosevelt and the Destroyers for Bases Agreement was established.

As of 2005, no other U.S. Navy ship has been named USS Welborn C. Wood.

== As HMS Chesterfield ==
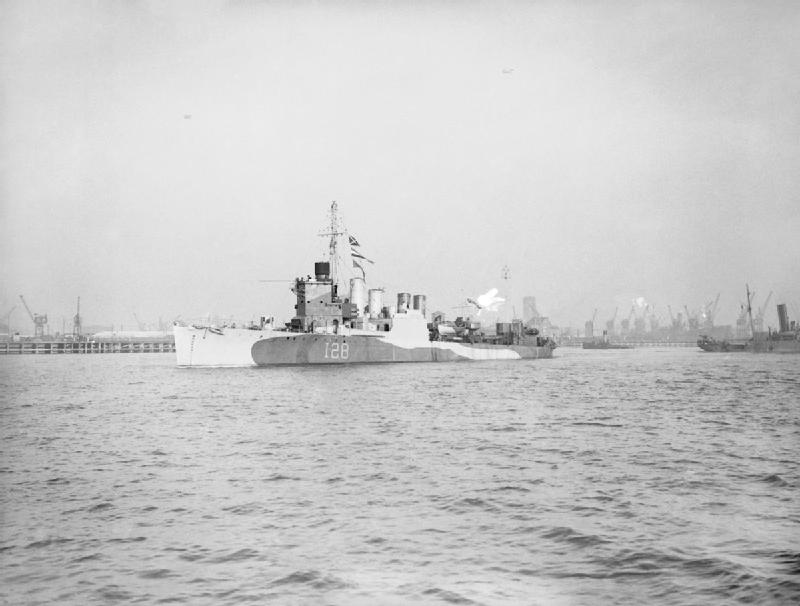
HMS Chesterfield, 15 November 1942

Welborn C. Wood became one of the first of the 50 over-age destroyers to be transferred to the British government in return for 99-year leases on base sites in the Western Hemisphere as part of the Destroyers for Bases Agreement. She and the rest of her division, Destroyer Division 67, arrived at Halifax, Nova Scotia, on 6 September 1940. The outgoing US crew familiarised the incoming British crew over the few days prior to the turnover ceremony. On 9 September 1940 Welborn C. Wood unfurled the Union Flag; she was subsequently struck from the Navy list on 8 January 1941.

The destroyer was renamed HMS Chesterfield (I28). During fitting out, she twice rammed HMS Churchill which was lying alongside, before she sailed for the British Isles. As part of the first Town flotilla, Chesterfield sailed for Belfast, Northern Ireland, and arrived at her destination on 18 November. Shifting to Plymouth on 22 November, the destroyer underwent a refit at Chatham before joining the 11th Escort Group, Western Approaches Command, based at Greenock. Chesterfield was modified for trade convoy escort service by removal of three of the original 4-inch (102 mm)/50 caliber guns and three of the triple torpedo tube mounts to reduce topside weight for additional depth charge stowage and installation of Hedgehog anti-submarine mortars.

From 1941 to 1943, Chesterfield escorted convoys in the North Atlantic. Chesterfield was assigned to Escort Group B-7 of the Mid-Ocean Escort Force during the winter of 1942–43. Screening Convoy HX 222 with Escort Group C-1 on 17 January 1943, the destroyer attacked the U-boat U-268 with a depth charge barrage, only to suffer damage from her own charges. Limping to Plymouth for repairs soon thereafter, the ship remained there until November 1943.

Allocated to the 5th Western Approaches Command for duty as a target vessel for aircraft, she remained engaged in this significant, but unglamorous, duty through 1944. Subsequently placed in reserve at Grangemouth, Firth of Forth, on 17 January 1945 Chesterfield was eventually broken up for scrap in 1948.
