= USS Maddox (DD-168) =

Wickes-class destroyer

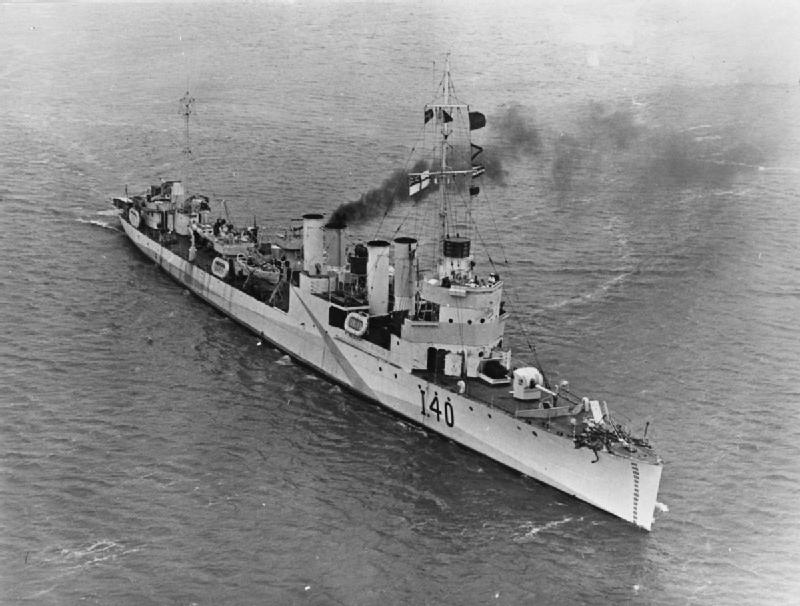
- HMS Georgetown

History

United States
- Name: USS Maddox
- Namesake: William A. T. Maddox
- Builder: Fore River Shipyard, Quincy, Massachusetts
- Laid down: 20 July 1918
- Launched: 27 October 1918
- Commissioned: 10 March 1919
- Decommissioned: 14 June 1922
- Recommissioned: 17 June 1940
- Decommissioned: 23 September 1940
- Stricken: 8 January 1941
- Identification: DD-168
- Fate: Transferred to UK, 23 September 1940

United Kingdom
- Name: HMS Georgetown
- Commissioned: 23 September 1940
- Identification: Pennant number: I40
- Fate: Transferred to Canada September 1942; returned by Canada December 1943; transferred to USSR 10 August 1944

Canada
- Name: Georgetown
- Commissioned: September 1942
- Fate: Returned to United Kingdom December 1943

Soviet Union
- Name: Doblestny ("Valiant"); or Zhyostky ("Rigid")
- Acquired: 10 August 1944
- Fate: Returned to UK, 4 February 1949 for scrapping, 16 September 1952

General characteristics
- Class & type: Wickes-class destroyer
- Displacement: 1,060 tons
- Length: 314 ft 5 in (95.83 m)
- Beam: 31 ft 8 in (9.65 m)
- Draft: 8 ft 6 in (2.59 m)
- Speed: 35 kn (65 km/h; 40 mph)
- Complement: 101 officers and enlisted
- Armament: 4 x 4"/50 caliber guns; 2 × 1-pounder guns; 12 x 21-inch (533 mm) torpedo tubes

USS Maddox (DD–168) was a Wickes-class destroyer in the United States Navy during World War I. She was later transferred to the Royal Navy as HMS Georgetown (I40), to the Royal Canadian Navy as HMCS Georgetown, and then to the Soviet Navy as Doblestny (or Zhyostky; sources vary). She was the last "four piper" destroyer to be scrapped.

== Construction and career ==
=== United States Navy service ===
Named for William A. T. Maddox, she was laid down on 20 July 1918 by the Fore River Shipbuilding Company, Quincy, Massachusetts. The ship was launched on 27 October 1918; sponsored by Mrs. Clarence N. Hinkamp, granddaughter of Captain Maddox. Maddox was commissioned on 10 March 1919. On 17 July 1920 she was designated DD-168.

Assigned to Division 21, Atlantic Fleet, Maddox departed Boston 3 May 1919 for Trepassey, Newfoundland, en route to the Azores where she became part of a "bridge of ships" assigned to guide US Navy flying boats NC-1 and NC-4 across the ocean on the first transatlantic flight. Returning to Boston on 22 May, the destroyer operated out of there until she sailed for Europe on 26 August 1919. Arriving at Brest, France on 19 September, she soon joined an honor escort for George Washington, then bound for Ostend, Belgium, to embark the Belgian King and Queen for the United States. Detached on 25 September, Maddox commenced cross-channel service. Until 24 October she escorted ships and carried naval and Army passengers from Dover and Harwich to Boulogne, France, and the Hook of Holland. Departing Harwich on 25 October, the four stacker proceeded through Kiel Canal to visit various Baltic ports.

Returning to the United States on 12 February 1920, Maddox operated out of Boston for the next 2 years, off the east coast. Departing Boston on 25 February 1922 for Philadelphia, she decommissioned at the Philadelphia Navy Yard on 14 June 1922.

Inactive for the next 18 years, Maddox recommissioned on 17 June 1940. After brief duty on mid-Atlantic Neutrality Patrol, she departed Newport, Rhode Island on 16 September 1940 for Halifax, Nova Scotia, where she decommissioned on 23 September 1940. The same day, under the destroyer-naval base agreement, she was transferred to Great Britain and commissioned in the Royal Navy as HMS Georgetown.

=== Royal Navy and Royal Canadian Navy service ===
As Georgetown, she participated in operation "Bowery", escorting the aircraft carrier Wasp in May 1942 on her second reinforcement of the Supermarine Spitfire strength on the island of Malta. In September 1942, she transferred to the Royal Canadian Navy for convoy escort duties in the western Atlantic, captained by Lt. Cdr. Peter Graeme MacIver. Georgetown was modified for trade convoy escort service by removal of three of the original 4"/50 caliber guns and one of the triple torpedo tube mounts to reduce topside weight for additional depth charge stowage and installation of Hedgehog anti-submarine launcher. Returned to the United Kingdom in December 1943, she joined the Reserve Fleet.

=== In Soviet service ===
In August 1944 Georgetown was turned over to the Soviet Navy. She was renamed (sources vary) either Doblestny (rus. "Glorious or Valiant") or Zhyostky (rus. "Rigid").

She was returned to the Royal Navy on 9 September 1952 and scrapped on 16 September 1952.

== Bibliography ==
- Gardiner, Robert; Chesneau, Roger, eds. (1980). Conway's All The World's Fighting Ships 1922–1946. London: Conway Maritime Press. ISBN 0-85177-146-7.
- Destroyers for Great Britain: A History of 50 Town Class Ships Transferred From the United States to Great Britain in 1940 (Rev. and expanded ed.). Annapolis, Maryland: Naval Institute Press. 1988. ISBN 0-87021-782-8.
- Lenton, H.T. and Colledge J.J. (1968). British and Dominion Warships of World War II. Doubleday and Company.
