= USS Foote (DD-169) =

Wickes-class destroyer

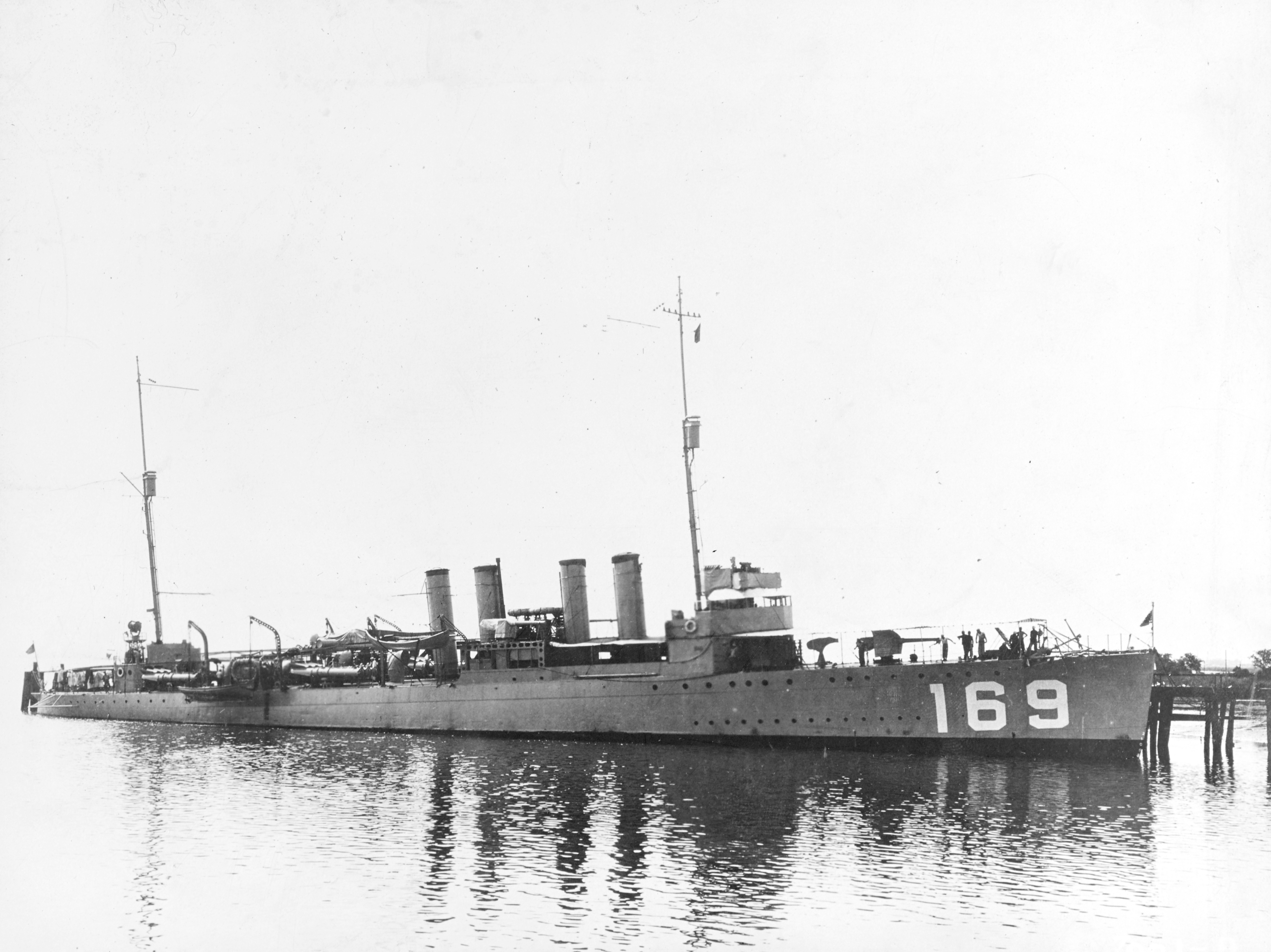
- USS Foote (DD-169)

History

United States
- Name: Foote
- Namesake: Andrew Hull Foote
- Builder: Fore River Shipbuilding Company, Quincy, Massachusetts
- Laid down: 7 August 1918
- Launched: 14 December 1918
- Commissioned: 21 March 1919
- Decommissioned: 6 July 1922
- Recommissioned: 2 July 1940
- Decommissioned: 23 September 1940
- Stricken: 8 January 1941
- Fate: Transferred to United Kingdom, 23 September 1940

United Kingdom
- Name: HMS Roxborough
- Commissioned: 23 September 1940
- Identification: Pennant number:I07
- Fate: Transferred to USSR, 1 August 1944

Soviet Union
- Name: Zhyostky ("Rigid"); (or Doblestny ("Valiant")
- Acquired: 1 August 1944
- Fate: Returned to UK, 7 February 1949 for scrapping, 14 May 1949

General characteristics
- Class & type: Wickes-class destroyer
- Displacement: 1,060 tons
- Length: 314 ft 5 in (95.83 m)
- Beam: 31 ft 8 in (9.65 m)
- Draft: 9 ft 2 in (2.79 m)
- Speed: 35 knots (65 km/h; 40 mph)
- Complement: 101 officers and enlisted
- Armament: 4 × 4 in (102 mm)/50 guns; 12 × 21 inch (533 mm) torpedo tubes; 1 × Depth charge projector

The second USS Foote (DD–169) was a Wickes-class destroyer in the United States Navy following World War I. She was transferred to the Royal Navy as HMS Roxborough (I07) and later to the Soviet Navy as Zhyostky (or Doblestny ; sources vary).

== Service history ==
=== As USS Foote ===
Named for Admiral Andrew Hull Foote, she was launched 14 December 1918 by Fore River Shipbuilding Company, Quincy, Massachusetts; sponsored by Mrs. Lelia F. Cady, daughter of Admiral Foote; and commissioned 21 March 1919.

Foote sailed from Boston 3 May 1919 to take up an observation station off Newfoundland for the historic first aerial crossing of the Atlantic, made later that month by Navy seaplanes. She returned to Boston 22 May to complete her interrupted fitting out, then took part in training operations until sailing from Newport 27 August bound for a tour of duty with Naval Forces European Waters. From September through December, she served in the Adriatic, and then called at Italian and French ports homeward bound. Arriving at Boston 12 February 1920, she was placed in reserve 24 February for repairs there and at Charleston.

In the summer of 1921, Foote operated with 50 percent of her complement during summer target practice in Narragansett Bay, and returning to Charleston, she lay there and at Boston for alterations and repairs until decommissioned at Philadelphia 6 July 1922. Recommissioned 2 July 1940, Foote operated on patrol out of Charleston, until sailing 7 September for Halifax, Nova Scotia. There, on 23 September 1940, she was decommissioned and transferred to the Royal Navy in the destroyers for land bases exchange.

=== As HMS Roxborough ===
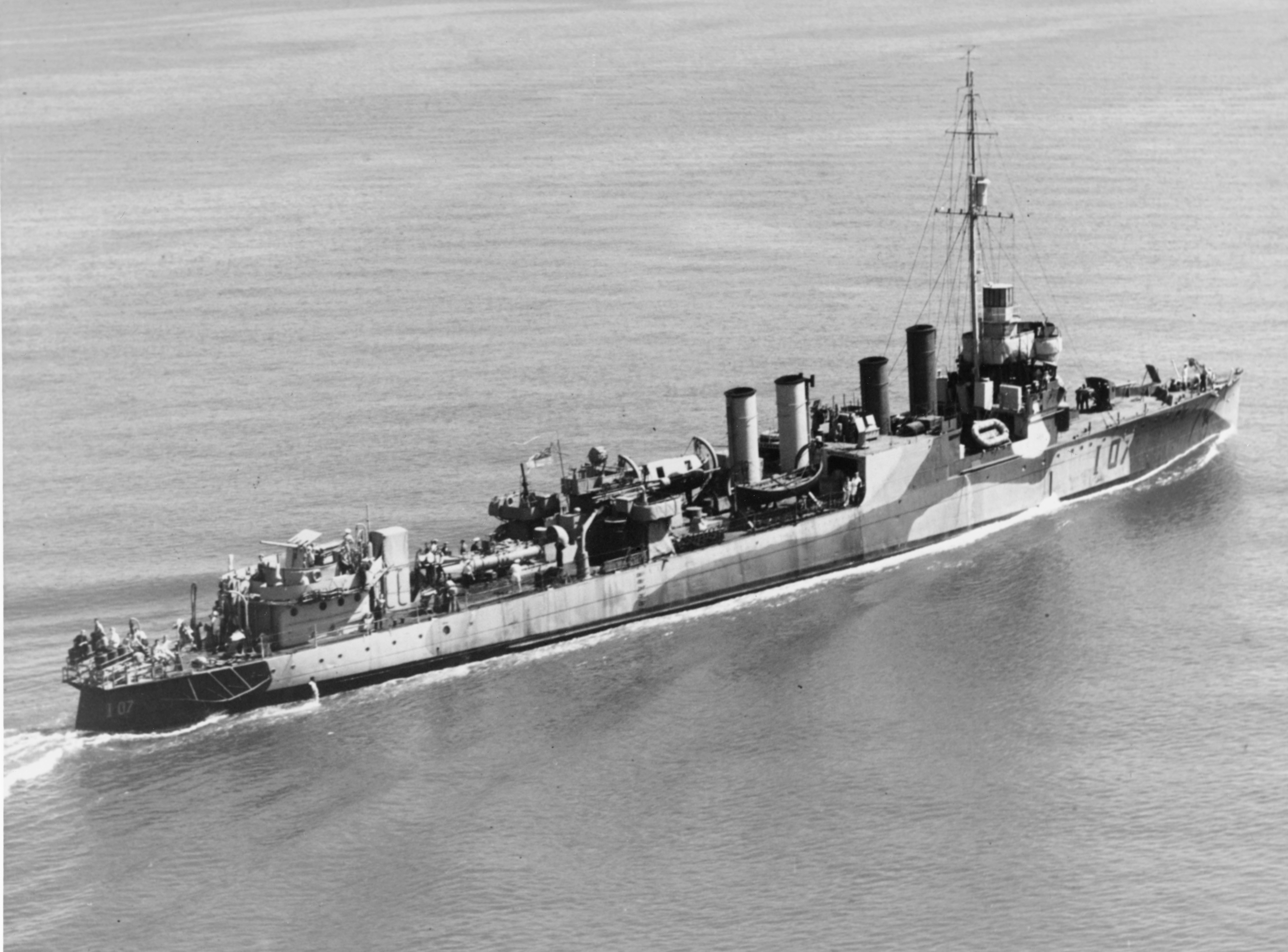
HMS Roxborough in Hampton Roads, 3 September 1942

Commissioned as HMS Roxborough 23 September 1940, the destroyer crossed the Atlantic to join the Western Approaches Command, guarding convoys during the dangerous last leg of their voyages into British ports. In March 1942, Roxborough took up western Atlantic escort duty out of Halifax, Nova Scotia. Roxborough was modified for trade convoy escort service by removal of three of the original 4 in (102 mm)/50 guns and one of the triple torpedo tube mounts to reduce topside weight for additional depth charge stowage and installation of Hedgehog anti-submarine mortar.

While with convoy HX222 Roxborough met with such heavy weather that the entire bridge structure was crushed, with eleven dead, including the Commanding Officer and 1st Lieutenant. The sole surviving executive officer managed to regain control of the ship, and under hand steering from aft, she made St. John's, Newfoundland.

Returning to the Tyne 10 January 1944, Roxborough lay in reserve there until transferred to the Soviet Navy on 1 August 1944.

=== In Soviet service ===
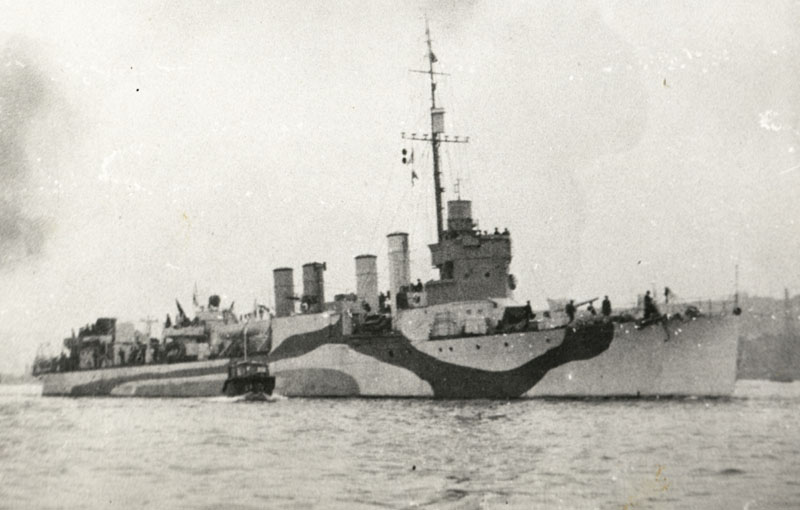
Zhyostky, c.1944-1949

On 1 August 1944 Roxborough was transferred to the Soviet Navy. She was renamed (sources vary) either Zhyostky (rus. "Rigid") or Doblestny (rus. "Glorious or Valiant"). She was returned to Great Britain 7 February 1949 and was scrapped on 14 May 1949.
