= USS Herndon (DD-198) =

Clemson-class destroyer

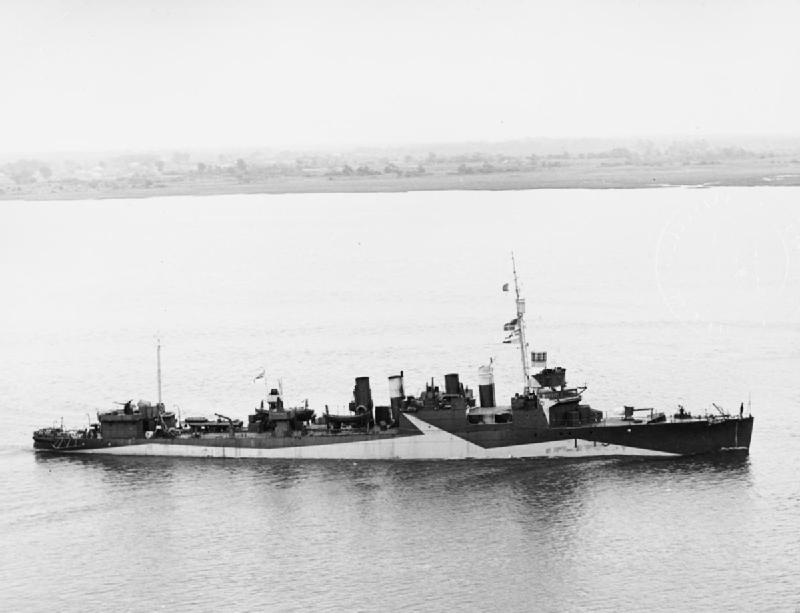
- HMS Churchill, underway, leaving a US Navy yard.

History

United States
- Name: USS Herndon
- Namesake: William Lewis Herndon
- Builder: Newport News Shipbuilding & Dry Dock Company
- Laid down: 25 November 1918
- Launched: 31 May 1919
- Commissioned: 14 September 1920
- Decommissioned: 6 June 1922
- Fate: Transferred to USCG, 1930

United States
- Acquired: 13 September 1930
- Commissioned: 7 March 1931
- Decommissioned: 28 May 1934
- Fate: Returned to Navy, 1934

United States
- Acquired: 1934
- Commissioned: 4 December 1939
- Decommissioned: 9 September 1940
- Stricken: 8 January 1941
- Fate: Transferred to UK, 9 September 1940

United Kingdom
- Name: HMS Churchill
- Acquired: 9 September 1940
- Commissioned: 9 September 1940
- Identification: Pennant number: I45
- Fate: Transferred to USSR, 16 July 1944

Soviet Union
- Name: Deyatelny (Деятельный)
- Acquired: 16 July 1944
- Fate: Sunk in action, 16 January 1945

General characteristics
- Class & type: Clemson-class destroyer
- Displacement: 1,190 long tons (1,209 t)
- Length: 314 ft (96 m)
- Beam: 31 ft 9 in (9.68 m)
- Draft: 9 ft 4 in (2.84 m)
- Installed power: 26,500 shp (19,800 kW)
- Propulsion: 2 × geared steam turbines; 2 × shafts
- Speed: 35 kn (40 mph; 65 km/h)
- Range: 4,900 nmi (5,600 mi; 9,100 km) at 15 kn (17 mph; 28 km/h)
- Complement: 122 officers and enlisted
- Armament: 4 × 4 in (100 mm)/50 cal guns, 3 × 3 in (76 mm)/23 cal guns, 12 × 21 inch (533 mm) torpedo tubes

USS Herndon (DD-198) was a Clemson-class destroyer in the United States Navy. Herndon served in the United States Coast Guard as CG-17. She was later transferred to the Royal Navy as HMS Churchill and still later to the Soviet Navy as Deyatelny.

== USS Herndon ==
The first Navy ship named for Commander William Lewis Herndon (1813–1857), Herndon was launched on 31 May 1919 by the Newport News Shipbuilding & Dry Dock Company, sponsored by Miss Lucy Taylor Herndon, niece of Commander Herndon. She was commissioned on 14 September 1920 at Norfolk, Virginia.

After shakedown in New England waters, Herndon was placed in reserve in Charleston, South Carolina on 3 November 1920. She served in reserve for training exercises and maneuvers along the US east coast until she was decommissioned at Philadelphia on 6 June 1922.

Herndon served in the United States Coast Guard from 1930 to 1934 as part of the Rum Patrol.

She was recommissioned into the Navy on 4 December 1939. Following trials and shakedown, she reached Guantanamo Bay on 23 January 1940 to join the Caribbean Neutrality Patrol. In July–August, she operated out of the Panama Canal Zone on tactical and antisubmarine maneuvers.

The Herndon Depot Museum in Herndon, Virginia houses artifacts from USS Herndon.

The Advertiser Gleam, a small town newspaper in Guntersville, AL, reported the ship's bell to be in the possession of a private individual residing in Albertville, AL. The article states Billy Sumner purchased the bell "from someone for just $20." The article also incorrectly identifies the bell as the ship's dinner bell. Based on photos contained in the article, it is very plainly the ship's bell from the USS Herndon launched in 1919. The U.S. Naval History and Heritage Command (NHHC) points out that ship's bells on U.S. Naval Warships are "used for signaling, keeping time, and sounding alarms... bells are an important part of a ship's routine and readiness." Additionally, the NHCC addresses the ownership claim of every bell ever taken from a commissioned naval vessel:

U.S. Navy bells are part of the many artifacts removed from decommissioned vessels and preserved by the Naval History and Heritage Command. They may be provided on loan to new namesake ships, naval commands with an historical mission or functional connection, and to museums and other institutions that are interpreting specific historical themes and displays of naval history. Ship's bells remain the permanent property of the U.S. Government and the Department of the Navy. Bells remain a powerful and tangible reminder of the history, heritage, and accomplishments of the naval service.

Thus, private ownership of the USS Herndon bell may be a violation of Navy regulations and Federal statutes.

== HMS Churchill ==
Herndon decommissioned and was turned over to Great Britain under the Destroyers for Bases Agreement at Halifax, Nova Scotia on 9 September 1940. As HMS Churchill, she served as leader of the first Town-class flotilla in transatlantic convoys and patrol duty off the Western Approaches to the British Isles. Notable events in her career in the Royal Navy included participation in the search for the German battleship Bismarck after she had sunk the battlecruiser HMS Hood, and a visit by her namesake, the Prime Minister Winston Churchill, on his way home from the Atlantic Conference with President Franklin D. Roosevelt in August 1941. Churchill was assigned to Escort Group B-7 of the Mid-Ocean Escort Force for convoys HX 186 and ON 94. Churchill also served as an escort for the pre- and post-invasion buildup for Operation Torch, the Allied invasion of North Africa. Churchill was modified for trade convoy escort service by removal of three of the original 4-inch (102 mm)/50 caliber guns and three of the triple torpedo tube mounts to reduce topside weight for additional depth charge stowage and installation of Hedgehog anti-submarine mortar. Churchill was assigned to Escort Group C-4 of the Mid-Ocean Escort Force for convoys SC 112, ON 158, HX 224, ON 177 and HX 235 during the winter of 1942–43

== Deyatelny ==
Transferred to the Soviet Navy 16 July 1944, the destroyer was renamed Deyatelny (Russian: Деятельный, lit. 'Active'). She was sunk while escorting a convoy over the treacherous route from Kola Inlet to the White Sea in the Kara Sea 40 nautical miles (74 km) east of Cape Terebirski (69°04′N 36°10′E), either by being torpedoed by U-956, or by accidental explosion of her depth charges while attacking the submarine, with the loss of 117 of her 124 crew. The seven survivors reported a massive explosion at the ship's stern. Survivors were rescued by Derzky.
