= USS Crowninshield =

Wickes-class destroyer

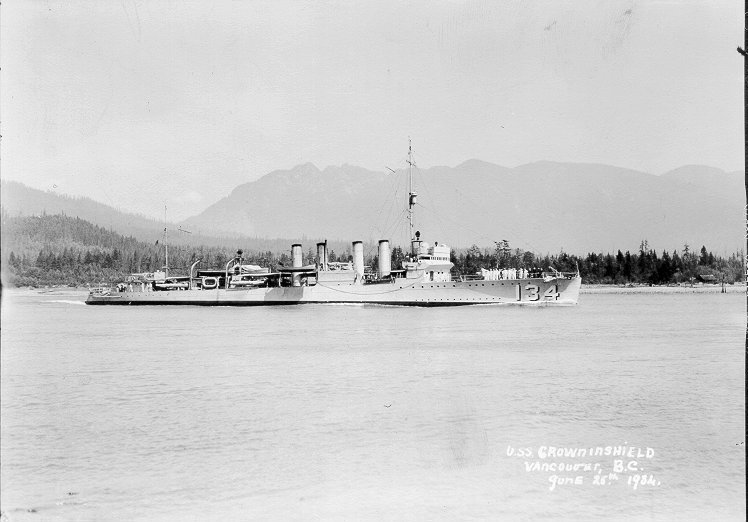
- USS Crowninshield

History

United States
- Name: USS Crowninshield
- Builder: Bath Iron Works
- Laid down: 5 November 1918
- Launched: 24 July 1919
- Commissioned: 6 August 1919
- Decommissioned: 7 July 1922
- Recommissioned: 12 May 1930
- Decommissioned: 8 April 1937
- Recommissioned: 30 September 1939
- Decommissioned: 9 September 1940
- Stricken: 8 January 1941
- Fate: Transferred to UK, 9 September 1940

United Kingdom
- Name: HMS Chelsea
- Commissioned: 9 September 1940
- Identification: I35
- Fate: Transferred to USSR, 16 July 1944
- Notes: Transferred to Royal Canadian Navy November 1942; returned by Canada 26 December 1943

Canada
- Name: HMCS Chelsea
- Acquired: November 1942
- Fate: Returned to United Kingdom, 26 December 1943

Soviet Union
- Name: Derzky (Дерзкий / Insolent)
- Acquired: 16 July 1944
- Fate: Returned to UK for scrapping, 23 June 1949

General characteristics
- Class & type: Wickes-class destroyer
- Displacement: 1,090 tons
- Length: 314 ft 5 in (95.83 m)
- Beam: 31 ft 8 in (9.65 m)
- Draft: 8 ft 8 in (2.64 m)
- Speed: 35 kn (65 km/h; 40 mph)
- Complement: 100 officers and enlisted
- Armament: 4 × 4"/50 caliber guns; 12 × 21 inch (533 mm) torpedo tubes

USS Crowninshield (DD-134) was a Wickes-class destroyer in the United States Navy between World War I and World War II. She was named for Benjamin Williams Crowninshield. In World War II she was transferred to the Royal Navy where she was named HMS Chelsea, and subsequently to the Soviet Navy where she was named Derzky. (Note: Alternate spelling Derzkiy)

== Construction and career ==
=== United States Navy ===
Crowninshield was launched 24 July 1919 by Bath Iron Works, Bath, Maine; sponsored by Emily Crowninshield Davis, great-great-granddaughter of Benjamin Williams Crowninshield. The ship was commissioned on 6 August 1919 and reported to the Atlantic Fleet.

Crowninshield cruised along the Atlantic coast and in the Caribbean, participating in 1921 in the fleet concentration in the Panama Canal Zone and Cuban waters. During this exercise she carried Secretary of the Navy Josephus Daniels from Key West to Guantanamo Bay for fleet maneuvers. From 14 November 1921 Crowninshield operated with 50 percent of her complement until placed out of commission in reserve at Philadelphia, Pennsylvania 7 July 1922.

Recommissioned 12 May 1930, Crowninshield arrived at San Diego, California 4 April 1931 to join the Battle Force. She took part in fleet problems and exercises on the west coast, in Hawaiian and Caribbean waters; operated with Aircraft, Battle Force; conducted practice cruises to Canadian and Alaskan ports for members of the Naval Reserve; and spent from 15 July to 17 December 1934 in the Rotating Reserve. She was at San Diego between 30 October and 2 November 1935, for the Presidential Fleet Review and attended the ceremonies opening the San Francisco–Oakland Bay Bridge in November 1936. Crowninshield was decommissioned at San Diego on 8 April 1937.

Recommissioned on 30 September 1939, Crowninshield sailed from Mare Island 25 November and arrived at Guantanamo Bay, Cuba on 10 December for duty with the Neutrality Patrol in the Caribbean and Gulf of Mexico. On 9 September 1940 she was decommissioned at Halifax (former city), Nova Scotia, and was delivered to British authorities in the land bases for destroyers exchange. She was commissioned in the Royal Navy as HMS Chelsea the same day.

=== Royal Navy and Royal Canadian Navy ===
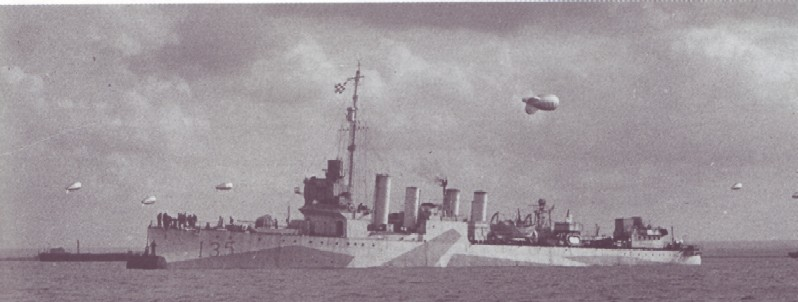
HMS Chelsea, 1942

Chelsea reached Devonport, England, 28 September 1940. Assigned to the Sixth Escort Group, Western Approaches Command, Liverpool, for Atlantic convoy duty, she fought the double-menace submarine and air attacks on vital supplies. On 6 April 1941 she rescued 29 survivors of SS Olga S. which had been sunk by an air attack. Chelsea was modified for trade convoy escort service by removal of three of the original 4"/50 caliber guns and one of the triple torpedo tube mounts to reduce topside weight for additional depth charge stowage and installation of hedgehog.

Chelsea joined Arbutus on 5 February 1942 to hunt for a submarine sighted from their convoy. Two hours later Arbutus was torpedoed. Chelsea opened fire on the surfaced submarine and made three depth charge attacks after she dived but contact was lost and she returned to pick up the survivors from Arbutus.

In November 1942 Chelsea was lent to the Royal Canadian Navy and until the end of 1943 operated in the mid and western Atlantic Ocean escorting convoys to and from Great Britain. She returned to Derry, Northern Ireland, 26 December 1943 and early in 1944 was reduced to reserve on the Tyne. On 16 July 1944 she was transferred to Russia and renamed Derzky (rus. Дерзкий, "Insolent"). (Note: Alternate spelling Derzkiy)

=== Soviet Navy ===
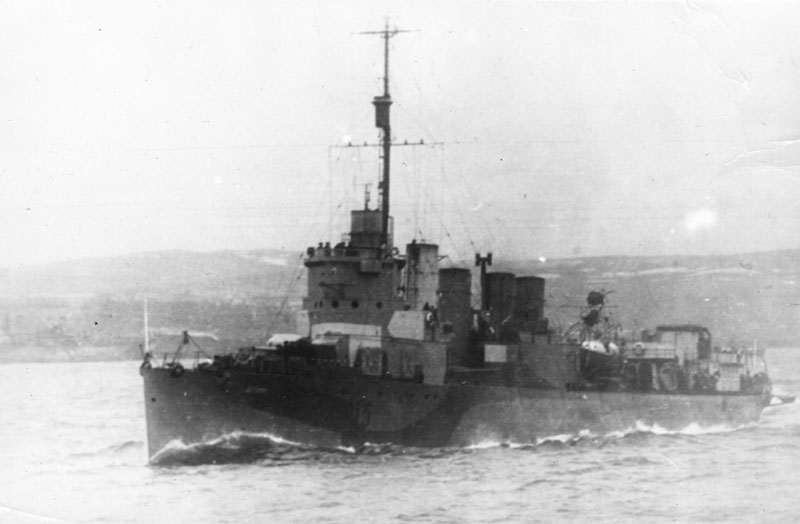
Derzky, c.1944-1945

Derzky was one of eight Town-class destroyers transferred to the Soviet Navy in lieu of Italian vessels surrendered in September 1943 and claimed by the Soviet Union as war reparations in May 1944. She sailed for Murmansk and was commissioned into the Northern Fleet. There she served as local convoy escort for the remainder of hostilities.

In 1949 she was transferred back to the Royal Navy, but was scrapped without re-commissioning.
