= Destroyers-for-bases deal =

1940 agreement between the US and UK

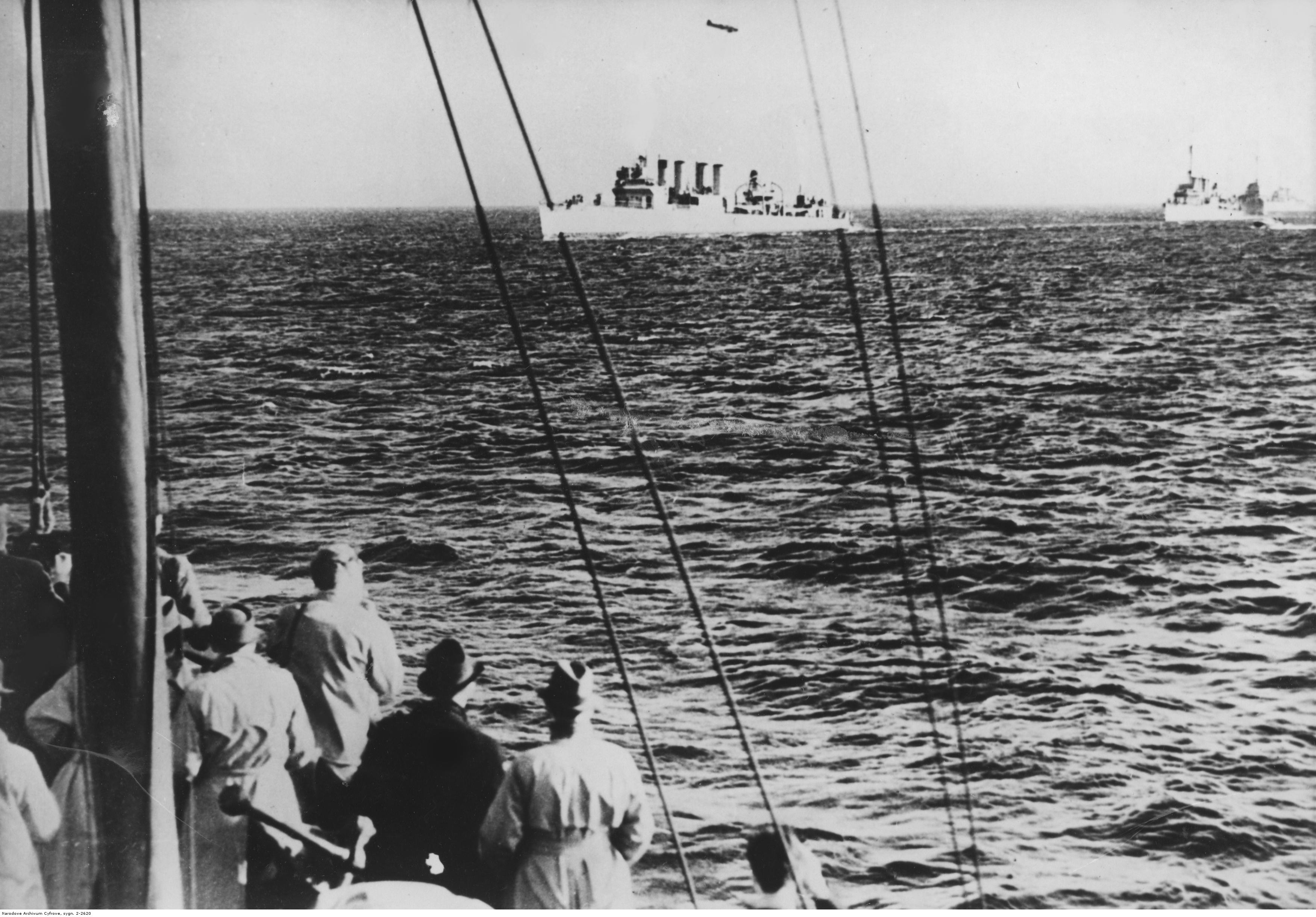
- Transferred destroyers sailing into British port, October 1940
- Signed: 2 September 1940
- Signatories: (United States) Franklin Roosevelt; (United Kingdom) Winston Churchill
- Parties: United States; United Kingdom
- Languages: English

The destroyers-for-bases deal was an agreement between the United States and the United Kingdom on 2 September 1940, according to which 50 Caldwell, Wickes, and Clemson-class US Navy destroyers were transferred to the Royal Navy from the US Navy in exchange for land rights on British territories. At the time, the United States was neutral in World War II.

Generally referred to as the "twelve hundred-ton type" (also known as "flush-deck", or "four-pipers" after their four funnels), the destroyers became the British Town class and were named after towns common to both countries. US President Franklin Roosevelt used an executive agreement, which does not require congressional approval. He was sharply criticised from antiwar Americans, who took the position that the agreement violated the Neutrality Acts.

== Background ==
By late June 1940, France had surrendered to Germany and Italy. The British Empire and the Commonwealth stood alone in warfare against Hitler and Mussolini. The British Chiefs of Staff Committee concluded in May that if France collapsed, "we do not think we could continue the war with any chance of success" without "full economic and financial support" from the United States. The US government was sympathetic to Britain's plight, but US public opinion overwhelmingly supported isolationism to avoid involvement in "another European war". Reflecting that sentiment, the US Congress had passed the Neutrality Acts three years earlier, which banned the shipment or sale of arms from the US to any combatant nation. US President Franklin D. Roosevelt was further constrained because the 1940 Presidential election was due, as his critics sought to portray him as being pro-war. Legal advice from the US Justice Department stated that the transaction was legal.

By late May, the evacuation of British forces from Dunkirk, France, in Operation Dynamo caused the Royal Navy to need ships immediately, especially as it was fighting the Battle of the Atlantic in which German U-boats threatened the British supplies of food and of other resources essential to the war effort. With German troops advancing rapidly into France and many in the US government convinced that the defeat of France and Britain was imminent, the US sent a proposal to London through the British ambassador, the Marquess of Lothian, for an American lease of airfields on Trinidad, Bermuda and Newfoundland.

The Prime Minister Winston Churchill initially rejected the offer on 27 May unless Britain received something immediate in return. On 1 June, as the defeat of France loomed, Roosevelt bypassed the Neutrality Act by declaring as "surplus" many millions of rounds of US ammunition and obsolescent small arms and authorising their shipment to Britain. Roosevelt rejected Churchill's pleas for destroyers for the Royal Navy. By August, while Britain was reaching a low point, US Ambassador Joseph P. Kennedy reported from London that a British surrender was "inevitable". Seeking to persuade Roosevelt to send the destroyers, Churchill warned Roosevelt that if Britain were vanquished, its colonial islands close to American shores could become a direct threat to the US if they fell into German hands.

== Deal ==
Roosevelt approved the deal on the evening of 30 August 1940. On 2 September 1940, as the Battle of Britain intensified, Secretary of State Cordell Hull signaled agreement to the transfer of the warships to the Royal Navy. On 3 September 1940, Admiral Harold Stark certified that the destroyers were not vital to US security. In exchange, the US was granted land in various British possessions for the establishment of naval or air bases with rent-free 99-year leases, on:

- Newfoundland
- Eastern side of the Bahamas
- Southern coast of Jamaica
- Western coast of Saint Lucia
- West coast of Trinidad (Gulf of Paria)
- Antigua
- British Guiana (now Guyana) within fifty miles of Georgetown

The agreement also granted the US air and naval base rights in:

- The Great Sound and Castle Harbour, Bermuda
- South and eastern coasts of Newfoundland

No destroyers were received in exchange for the bases in Bermuda and Newfoundland. Both territories were vital to trans-Atlantic shipping, aviation, and the Battle of the Atlantic. Although an attack on either territory was unlikely, it could not be discounted and Britain had been forced wastefully to maintain defensive forces, including the Bermuda Garrison. The deal allowed Britain to hand much of the defence of Bermuda to the neutral US, which freed British forces for redeployment to more active theatres and enabled the development of strategic facilities at US expense, which British forces would also use.

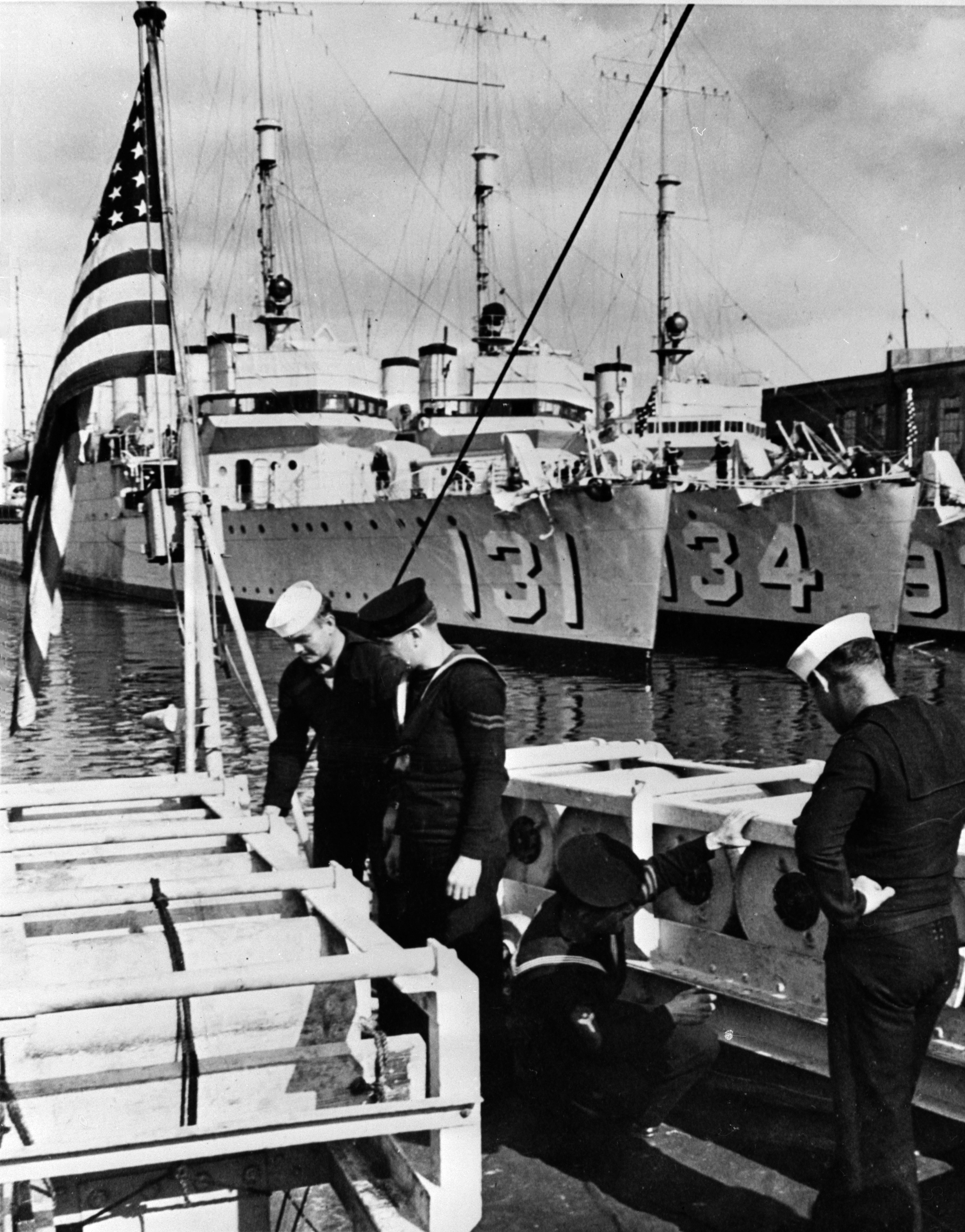
American and British sailors examine depth charges. In the background are US Wickes-class destroyers before their transfer

The Royal Air Force (RAF) and the Fleet Air Arm (FAA) maintained air stations in Bermuda at the start of the war, but they served only flying boats. The RAF station on Darrell's Island served as a staging point for trans-Atlantic flights by RAF Transport Command and RAF Ferry Command, BOAC, and Pan-Am and hosted the Bermuda Flying School, but it did not operate maritime patrols. The FAA station on Boaz Island serviced aircraft based on vessels operating from or through the Royal Naval Dockyard, but it attempted to maintain maritime patrols by using pilots from naval ships, RAF Darrell's Island and the Bermuda Flying School.

The agreement for bases in Bermuda stipulated that the US would, at its own expense, build an airfield capable of handling large landplanes that would be operated jointly by the US Army Air Force and the Royal Air Force. The airfield was named Kindley Field after Field Kindley, an American aviator who fought for Britain during World War I. RAF Transport Command relocated its operations to the airfield when it was completed in 1943, but RAF Ferry Command remained at Darrell's Island. The US Navy had established the Naval Operating Base at Bermuda's West End, a flying boat station from which maritime patrols were operated for the remainder of the war (the US Navy had actually begun operating such patrols from RAF Darrell's Island by using floatplanes and was waiting for their own base to become operational). The RAF and FAA facilities were closed after the war, which left only the US air bases in Bermuda. The Naval Operating Base ceased to be an air station in 1965, when its flying boats were replaced by Lockheed P-2 Neptunes operating from the Kindley Air Force Base (as the former US Army airfield had become). Those US air bases were in fact only two of several US military facilities that operated in Bermuda during the 20th century. In spite of the 99-year lease, the US abandoned many of the bases in 1949, and the remaining few were closed by 1995.

The US accepted the "generous action... to enhance the national security of the United States" and immediately transferred in return 50 Caldwell, Wickes, and Clemson-class U.S. Navy destroyers, "generally referred to as the twelve hundred-ton type" (also known as "flush-deckers", or "four-pipers" after their four funnels). Forty-three ships initially went to the Royal Navy and seven to the Royal Canadian Navy. In the Commonwealth navies, the ships were renamed after towns and so were known as the "Town" class, but they had originally belonged to three classes (Caldwell, Wickes, and Clemson). Before the end of the war, nine others had also served with the Royal Canadian Navy. Five Towns were manned by Royal Norwegian Navy crews, with the survivors later returned to the Royal Navy. HMS Campbeltown was manned by Royal Netherlands Navy sailors before her assignment to the St. Nazaire Raid. Nine other destroyers were eventually transferred to the Soviet Navy. Six of the 50 destroyers were lost to U-boats, and three others, including Campbeltown, were destroyed in other circumstances.

Britain had no choice but to accept the deal, but it was so much more advantageous to the United States than Britain that Churchill's aide John Colville compared it to the USSR's relationship with Finland. The destroyers were in reserve from the massive US shipbuilding program during World War I, and many of the vessels required extensive overhaul because they had not been preserved properly while inactivated. British Admiral Bertram Ramsay called them the "worst destroyers I had ever seen", and only 30 were in service by May 1941. Churchill also disliked the deal, but his advisers persuaded him merely to tell Roosevelt,

We have so far only been able to bring a few of your fifty destroyers into action on account of the many defects which they naturally develop when exposed to Atlantic weather after having been laid up so long.

Roosevelt responded by transferring ten Lake-class Coast Guard cutters to the Royal Navy in 1941. The United States Coast Guard vessels were ten years younger than the destroyers and had greater range, which made them more useful as anti-submarine convoy escorts.

The agreement was much more important for being the start of the wartime Anglo-American partnership. Churchill said in the British Parliament that "these two great organisations of the English-speaking democracies, the British Empire and the United States, will have to be somewhat mixed up together in some of their affairs for mutual and general advantage".

== Bases ==
=== Newfoundland ===
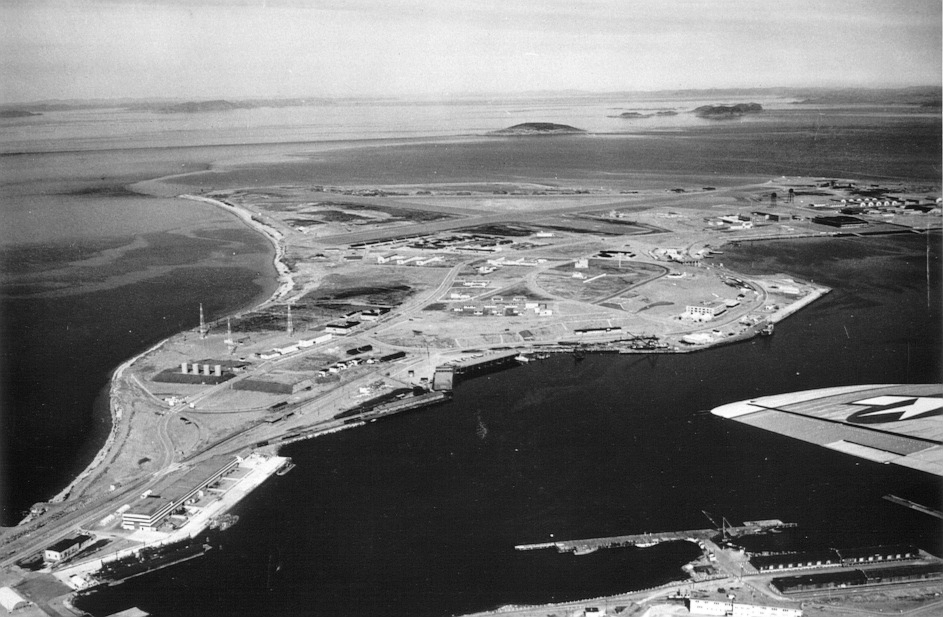
U.S. Navy Naval Station Argentia, Newfoundland

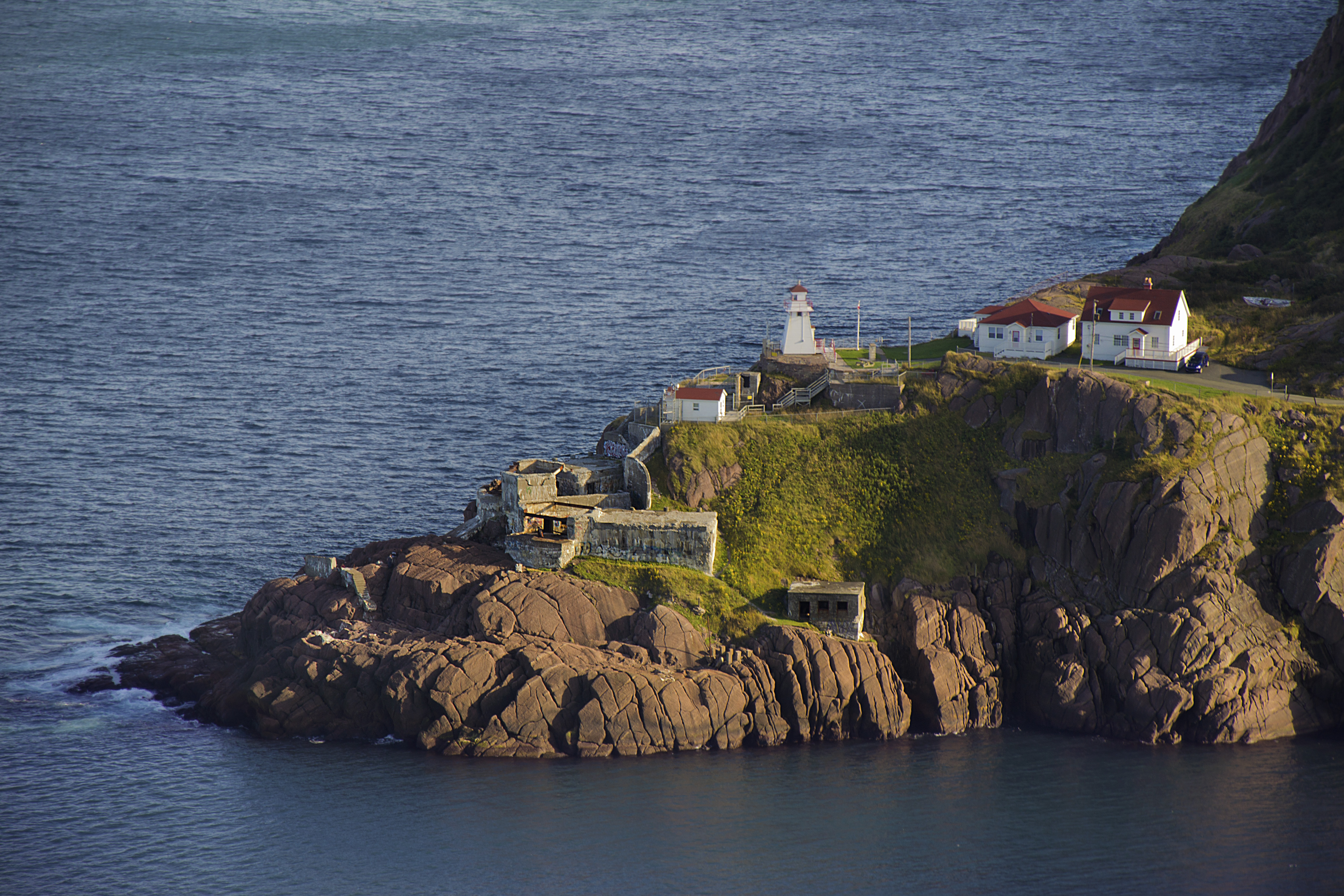
Coastal artillery battery at Fort Amherst, Newfoundland

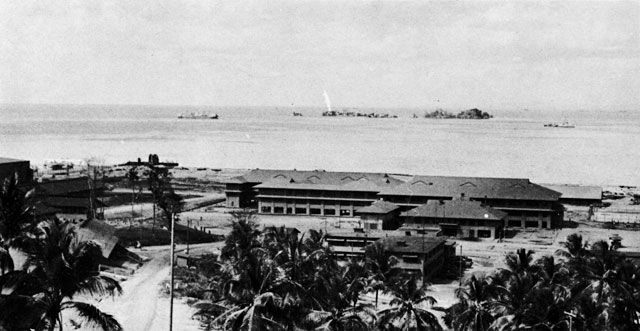
Naval Base Trinidad at Carenage Bay

Army Air Force airfields:

- Pepperrell Airfield (later AFB) (closed August 1961; turned over to Canadian Forces as CFS St. John's)
- Goose Bay Army Airfield (later Goose AFB) (turned over to Canadian Forces as CFB Goose Bay, July 1976)
- Stephenville Army Airfield (later Ernest Harmon AFB) (closed December 1966; now Stephenville International Airport)
- McAndrew Army Airfield (McAndrew Air Force Base in 1948; transferred to US Navy, 1955)

A Naval Air Station:

- Naval Station Argentia (closed 1994). Location of the August 1941 Atlantic Conference resulting in the Atlantic Charter.

Coastal defense batteries:

- The Harbor Defenses of Argentia and St. John's under control of United States Army Coast Artillery Corps (closed 1945)

United States Army General Surveillance Ground Radar stations:

- Allan's Island; Cape Spear; Elliston Ridge; Fogo Island; St. Bride's radar stations (closed 1945)

=== British West Indies ===
- Antigua

Naval Air Station Crabbs at Crabbs Peninsula
An Army Air Force airfield (Coolidge Army Airfield (later AFB)) (closed 1949)

- The Bahamas

Naval seaplane base on Exuma Island at George Town.

- British Guiana

An Army Air Force airfield (Atkinson Aerodrome (later AFB)) (closed 1949)
A Naval seaplane base near Suddie, NAF British Guiana

- Barbados

NAVFAC Harrison's Point, Saint Lucy (closed 1979)

- Bermuda

Not part of the exchange, but the US received base rights here for free, in addition to those that were part of the exchange. The US Naval Operating Base was established in 1940, operating as a flying boat base until 1965 (when the US Navy switched to using landplanes from Kindley Air Force Base). The base continued in use for other purposes as the US Naval Annex until 1995. Construction began at the same time of a US Army Air Force airfield, Kindley Field, which was attached to Fort Bell and later became Kindley AFB. Transferred to the US Navy in 1970, it operated as NAS Bermuda until it closed in 1995.

- Jamaica

An Army Air Force airfield (Vernam Army Airfield (later AFB)) (closed 1949)
A Naval Air Station (Little Goat Island) and a Naval facility at Port Royal

- Saint Lucia

An Army Air Force airfield (Beane Army Airfield (later AFB)) (closed 1949)
A Naval Air Station (Gros Islet Bay) NAF St. Lucia (closed 1977)

- Trinidad

Naval Base Trinidad, Major base 1941 to 1977
Two Army Air Force airfields

Waller Army Airfield (later AFB) (closed 1949)
Carlsen Army Airfield (later AFB) (closed 1949)

An emergency airstrip (Camden Airstrip)
A Naval Operating Base, a Naval Air Station, blimp base, and a radio station

== Ships ==
A total of 50 ships were reassigned: 3 Caldwell-class, 27 Wickes-class and 20 Clemson-class destroyers.

No	Name	Class	Year of launch	Service history and fate
01	USS Craven (DD-70)	Caldwell	1918	To Britain. Renamed HMS Lewes. Scuttled on 12 October 1945.
02	USS Conner (DD-72)	Caldwell	1917	To Britain. Renamed HMS Leeds. Broken up in 1947.
03	USS Stockton (DD-73)	Caldwell	1917	To Britain. Renamed HMS Ludlow. Sunk as a target in 1945.
04	USS Wickes (DD-75)	Wickes	1918	To Britain. Renamed HMS Montgomery. Broken up in 1945.
05	USS Philip (DD-76)	Wickes	1918	To Britain. Renamed HMS Lancaster. Broken up in 1947.
06	USS Evans (DD-78)	Wickes	1918	To Britain. Renamed HMS Mansfield. Broken up in 1945.
07	USS Sigourney (DD-81)	Wickes	1917	To Britain. Renamed HMS Newport. Broken up in 1947.
08	USS Robinson (DD-88)	Wickes	1918	To Britain. Renamed HMS Newmarket. Broken up in 1945.
09	USS Ringgold (DD-89)	Wickes	1918	To Britain. Renamed HMS Newark. Broken up in 1947.
10	USS Fairfax (DD-93)	Wickes	1917	To Britain. Renamed HMS Richmond. To USSR in 1944. Renamed Zhivuchiy ("Tenacious"). Broken up in 1949.
11	USS Williams (DD-108)	Wickes	1918	To Canada. Renamed HMCS St. Clair. Foundered in 1946.
12	USS Twiggs (DD-127)	Wickes	1918	To Britain. Renamed HMS Leamington. To USSR in 1944. Renamed Zhguchiy ("Firebrand"). Recreated the St. Nazaire raid in the Trevor Howard film Gift Horse. Broken up in 1951.
13	USS Buchanan (DD-131)	Wickes	1919	To Britain. Renamed HMS Campbeltown. Intentionally destroyed in the St. Nazaire Raid on 28 March 1942.
14	USS Aaron Ward (DD-132)	Wickes	1919	To Britain. Renamed HMS Castleton. Broken up in 1947.
15	USS Hale (DD-133)	Wickes	1919	To Britain. Renamed HMS Caldwell. Broken up in 1944.
16	USS Crowninshield (DD-134)	Wickes	1919	To Britain. Renamed HMS Chelsea. To USSR in 1944. Renamed Derzkiy ("Ardent"). Broken up in 1949.
17	USS Tillman (DD-135)	Wickes	1919	To Britain. Renamed HMS Wells. Broken up in 1945.
18	USS Claxton (DD-140)	Wickes	1919	To Britain. Renamed HMS Salisbury. Broken up in 1944.
19	USS Yarnall (DD-143)	Wickes	1918	To Britain. Renamed HMS Lincoln. To Canada in 1942. Renamed HMCS Lincoln. To USSR in 1944. Renamed Druzhny ("United"). Last one to be broken up, in 1952.
20	USS Thatcher (DD-162)	Wickes	1918	To Canada. Renamed HMCS Niagara. Broken up in 1946.
21	USS Cowell (DD-167)	Wickes	1918	To Britain. Renamed HMS Brighton. To USSR in 1944. Renamed Zharkiy ("Zealous"). Returned to Britain and broken up in 1949.
22	USS Maddox (DD-168)	Wickes	1918	To Britain. Renamed HMS Georgetown. To USSR in 1944. Renamed Doblestny ("Valiant"). Broken up in 1949.
23	USS Foote (DD-169)	Wickes	1918	To Britain. Renamed HMS Roxborough. To USSR in 1944. Renamed Zhostkiy ("Adamant"). Returned to Britain and broken up in 1949.
24	USS Kalk (DD-170)	Wickes	1918	To Canada. Renamed HMCS Hamilton. Broken up in 1945.
25	USS Mackenzie (DD-175)	Wickes	1918	To Canada. Renamed HMCS Annapolis. Broken up in 1945.
26	USS Hopewell (DD-181)	Wickes	1918	To Britain. Renamed HMS Bath. Transferred to Norwegian navy April 1941. Sunk on 19 August 1941, by U-204.
27	USS Thomas (DD-182)	Wickes	1918	To Britain. Renamed HMS St. Albans. To USSR in 1944. Renamed Dostoyny ("Excellent"). Broken up in 1949.
28	USS Haraden (DD-183)	Wickes	1918	Initially to Britain and then on to Canada. Renamed HMS Columbia then HMCS Columbia. Broken up in 1945.
29	USS Abbot (DD-184)	Wickes	1918	To Britain. Renamed HMS Charlestown. Broken up in 1947.
30	USS Doran (DD-185)	Wickes	1918	To Britain. Renamed HMS St. Marys. Broken up in 1945.
31	USS Satterlee (DD-190)	Clemson	1918	To Britain. Renamed HMS Belmont. Sunk by U-82 on 31 January 1942.
32	USS Mason (DD-191)	Clemson	1919	To Britain. Renamed HMS Broadwater. Sunk by U-101 on 18 October 1941.
33	USS Abel P Upshur (DD-193)	Clemson	1918	To Britain. Renamed HMS Clare. Broken up in 1945.
34	USS Hunt (DD-194)	Clemson	1920	To Britain. Renamed HMS Broadway. Broken up in 1947.
35	USS Welborn C Wood (DD-195)	Clemson	1920	To Britain. Renamed HMS Chesterfield. Broken up in 1947.
36	USS Branch (DD-197)	Clemson	1919	To Britain. Renamed HMS Beverley. Sunk by U-188 on 11 April 1943.
37	USS Herndon (DD-198)	Clemson	1919	To Britain. Renamed HMS Churchill. To USSR in 1944. Renamed Deyatelny ("Active"). Sank on 16 January 1945, in uncertain circumstances.
38	USS McCook (DD-252)	Clemson	1919	To Canada. Renamed HMCS St. Croix. Sunk by U-952 on 20 September 1943.
39	USS McCalla (DD-253)	Clemson	1919	To Britain. Renamed HMS Stanley. Sunk by U-574 on 18 December 1941.
40	USS Rodgers (DD-254)	Clemson	1919	To Britain. Renamed HMS Sherwood. Sunk as a target in 1945.
41	USS Bancroft (DD-256)	Clemson	1919	To Canada. Renamed HMCS St. Francis. Foundered in 1945 while en route to scrap yard.
42	USS Welles (DD-257)	Clemson	1919	To Britain. Renamed HMS Cameron. Damaged beyond repair in an air raid at Portsmouth on 5 December 1940.
43	USS Aulick (DD-258)	Clemson	1919	To Britain. Renamed HMS Burnham. Broken up in 1947.
44	USS Laub (DD-263)	Clemson	1918	To Britain. Renamed HMS Burwell. Broken up in 1947.
45	USS McLanahan (DD-264)	Clemson	1918	To Britain. Renamed HMS Bradford. Broken up in 1946.
46	USS Edwards (DD-265)	Clemson	1918	To Britain. Renamed HMS Buxton. To Canada in 1943. Renamed HMCS Buxton. Broken up in 1946.
47	USS Shubrick (DD-268)	Clemson	1918	To Britain. Renamed HMS Ripley. Broken up in 1945.
48	USS Bailey (DD-269)	Clemson	1919	To Britain. Renamed HMS Reading. Broken up in 1945.
49	USS Swasey (DD-273)	Clemson	1919	To Britain. Renamed HMS Rockingham. Struck a mine on 27 September 1944, and sank while under tow.
50	USS Meade (DD-274)	Clemson	1919	To Britain. Renamed HMS Ramsey. Broken up in 1947.

== See also ==
- Banff-class sloops, similarly transferred to the Royal Navy in 1941
- Tizard Mission
- Lend-Lease, a successor agreement loosely modelled on the Destroyers for Bases Agreement
- Northeast Air Command for airfields in Newfoundland and Labrador
- Town-class destroyer, some of which were transferred to Soviet Navy
- United States S-class submarine, some of which were transferred to Royal Navy
