= Opana =

Opana may refer to:

- Opana Radar Site, a National Historic Landmark commemorating the first use of radar, located on Oahu, Hawaii
- Opana, a brand name for the opioid oxymorphone
