= Paul E. Watson =

American inventor

- Born: Bangor, Maine
- Died: September 18, 1943; Fort Monmouth, New Jersey
- Allegiance: United States
- Service / branch: Army
- Rank: Colonel

Paul E. Watson (died September 18, 1943) was a pioneer researcher in the development of radar. Born in Bangor, Maine, Watson was a civilian engineer employed by the U.S. Army Signal Corps from the late 1920s. In 1936, he was named Chief Engineer of a Signal Corps research group at Camp Evans in Fort Monmouth, New Jersey tasked with developing a workable long-range radar for coast defense. By 1937 Watson's team had developed a proto-type "Search Light Control Radar" (SCR-270) apparatus and successfully demonstrated it to the Secretary of War at Fort Monmouth. Watson's team then became the "Radio Position Finding Section", and worked with the Westinghouse Corporation over the following year to develop an Early Warning Radar, which was successfully deployed at Highlands, New Jersey in August, 1938, and was capable of detecting incoming bombers at a range of 78 miles. A second system was deployed in Meriden, Connecticut in June, 1939, with an operational range of 138 miles.

Watson's prototypes were adopted by the Army in 1940 and Westinghouse delivered 112 sets prior to the American entry into World War II. This was the first radar system to be deployed by the United States military. Six of these sets were made operational in Hawaii by December 1941, and one, at Opana Point, detected the incoming Japanese air assault on Pearl Harbor on the morning of December 7.

Watson was made a U.S. Army major with the outbreak of the war in 1941, and had risen to the rank of colonel by his death of a cerebral hemorrhage on September 18, 1943, at Fort Monmouth, New Jersey. His laboratory at Camp Evans was named "Watson Laboratories" after his death, and continued to be the chief Army electronics lab until absorbed by the new U.S. Air Force into the current Rome Laboratory.

Ironically, in the 1990s the U.S. Air Force would control the world's most powerful radar, designed to cover the entire Atlantic Ocean from Europe to Africa, from a headquarters in Watson's home town of Bangor, Maine.
