= SCR-270 =

Early U.S. Army radar type that detected Pearl Harbor attack

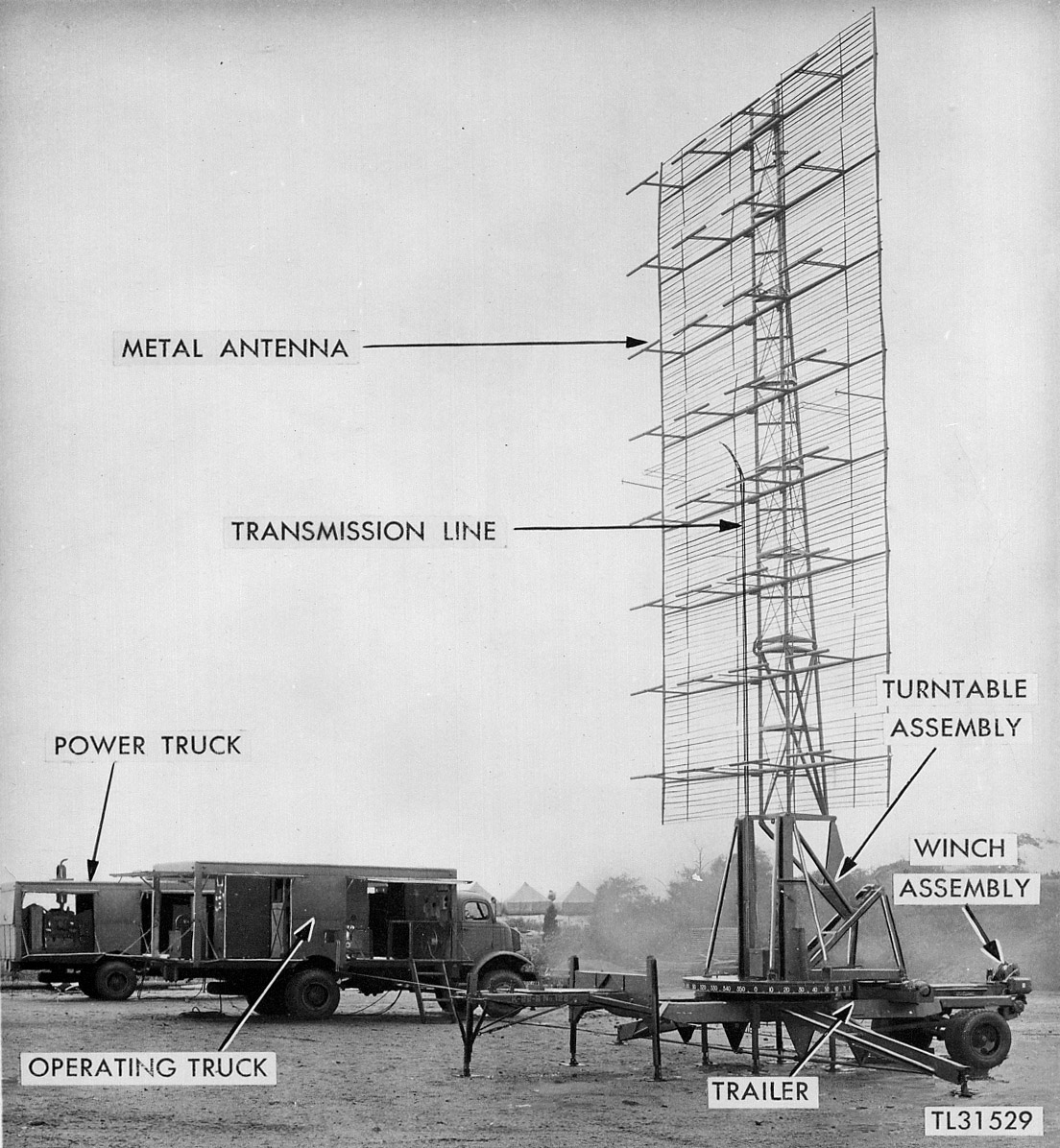
- SCR-270: Similar to the model that detected the attacking Pearl Harbor planes (the actual Opana antenna was nine dipoles high by four wide, instead of the eight-by-four configuration shown here). The scale for reading the direction the antenna is pointing to can be seen at the base.
- Country of origin: United States
- Introduced: 1940
- Type: 2D air-search
- Frequency: 106 MHz
- PRF: 621 Hz
- Pulsewidth: 10 to 25 microseconds
- RPM: 1 RPM
- Range: 150 miles (240 km)
- Diameter: 8 by 4 dipole array typical
- Azimuth: 0–360°
- Precision: 4 mi (6.4 km) 2°
- Power: 100 kW peak

The SCR-270 was one of the first operational early-warning radars. It was the U.S. Army's primary long-distance radar throughout World War II and was deployed around the world. It is also known as the Pearl Harbor Radar, since it was an SCR-270 set that detected the incoming raid about 45 minutes before the 7 December 1941, attack on Pearl Harbor commenced.

Two versions were produced, the mobile SCR-270, and the fixed SCR-271 which used the same electronics but used an antenna with somewhat greater resolution. An upgraded version, the SCR-289, was also produced, but saw little use. The -270 versions were eventually replaced by newer microwave units based on cavity magnetron that was introduced to the US during the Tizard Mission. The only early warning system of the sort to see action in World War II was the AN/CPS-1, which was available in mid-1944, in time for D-Day.

== Building of the radar ==
The Signal Corps had been experimenting with some radar concepts as early as the late 1920s, under the direction of Colonel William R. Blair, director of the Signal Corps Laboratories at Fort Monmouth, New Jersey. Although the Army focused primarily on infra-red detection systems (a popular idea at the time), in 1935 work turned to radar again when one of Blair's recent arrivals, Roger B. Colton, convinced him to send another engineer to investigate the US Navy's CXAM radar project. William D. Hershberger went to see what they had, and returned a positive report. Gaining the support of James B. Allison, the Chief Signal Officer, they managed to gather a small amount of funding and diverted some from other projects. A research team was organized under the direction of civilian engineer Paul E. Watson.

By December 1936 Watson's group had a working 3 meter prototype, which detected a unlighted bomber at night, in a demonstration to the Secretary of War. Then in 1938, the 1.5 meter prototype was demonstrated to Hap Arnold. The Martin B-10 bomber had originally been instructed to fly to a known point for the radar to find it, but could not be located at the agreed upon time. The radar operators then searched for the bomber and located it far from its intended position. It was later learned that winds had blown the bomber off course, so what was to be a simple demonstration turned into an example of real-world radar location and tracking. Development of this system continued as the SCR-268, which eventually evolved into an excellent short-to-medium range gun laying system.

In April 1937 a LtC. Davis, an officer in an Army Air Corps Pursuit Squadron in the Panama Canal Zone (CZ), sent a request for a "Means of Radio Detection of Aircraft" to the US Army's Chief Signal Officer (CSig.), bypassing normal channels of command. The SCR-268 was not really suited to this need, and after its demonstration in May they again received a request for a long-range unit, this time from "Hap" Arnold who wrote to them 3 June 1937.

Shortly thereafter the Signal Corps became alarmed that their radar work was being observed by German spies, and moved development to Sandy Hook at Fort Hancock, the coast artillery defense site for Lower New York Bay. After the move, work immediately started on the Air Corps request for what was to become known (in 1940) as the "Radio Set SCR-270". Parts of the SCR-268 were diverted to this new project, delaying the completion of the -268.

== Deployment and Incomprehension ==
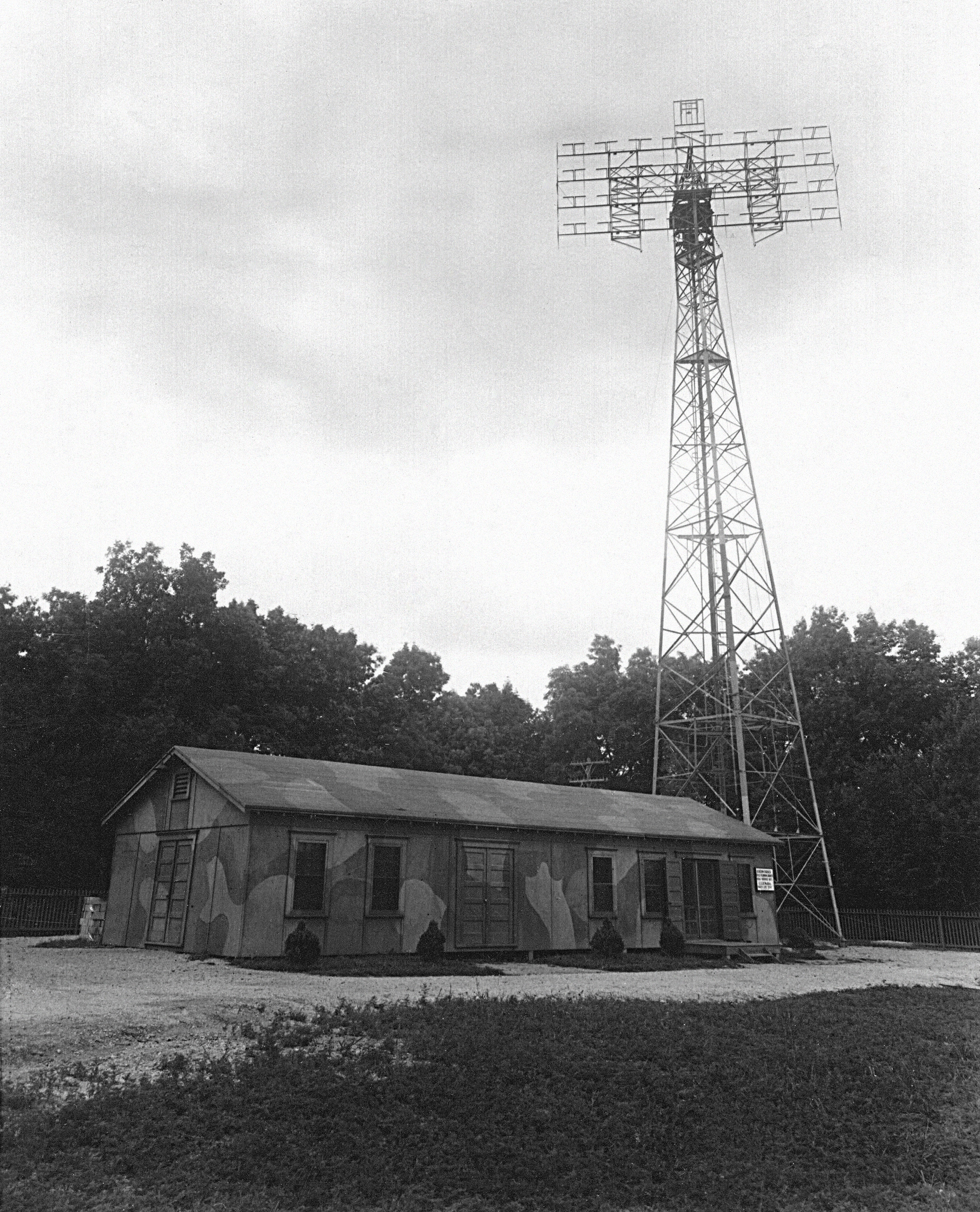
Non portable version: the SCR-271 at Camp Evans

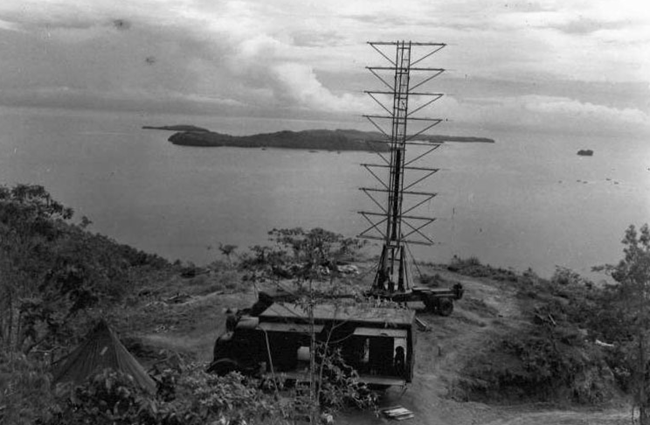
SCR-270 in New Guinea, similar to the one at Opana, Oahu, that detected the Japanese attack aircraft

The non-portable version, the SCR-271-A, s/n 1 was delivered to the Canal Zone and began operation in October 1940 at Fort Sherman on the Atlantic end of the Panama Canal. It picked up airliners at 117 miles (188 km) in its initial test run. The second set was set up on Fort Grant's Taboga Island on the Pacific end of the Canal by December 1940, thus giving radar coverage to the vitally important but vulnerable Panama Canal. Westinghouse quickly ramped up production, and produced 100 by the end of 1941.

Operators of sets that were sent to the Panama Canal, the Philippines, Hawaii and other strategic locations were all gathered for an air defense school at Mitchel Field, New York in April 1941. The school was the culmination of efforts begun in 1940, when the War Department created the Air Defense Command headed by Brig. Gen. James E. Chaney. Chaney was tasked by Hap Arnold to collect all information on the British air defense system and transfer the knowledge as quickly as possible to the US military. Air Marshal Dowding, one of the designers of the Ground-controlled interception (GCI) air defense system used during the Battle of Britain, was at the school and discussed with the American generals the design and urgency of establishing the Hawaiian system, in particular emphasizing the need for thorough radar site coverage along the coasts.

Despite the high-level attention and the excellence of the school in training on the use of the SCR-270 and its integration and coordination with fighter intercepts, the army did not follow through on supporting the junior officers who were trained at this session. Air defense required direct control of assets spread out over disparate units; anti-aircraft guns, radars, and interceptor aircraft were not under a unified command. This had been one of the primary problems identified by Robert Watson-Watt prior to the war, when a demonstration of an early radar system had gone comically wrong even though the radar system itself had worked perfectly. Dowding was well aware of the importance of a unified command, but this knowledge did not result in changes within the U.S. Army structure.

== SCR-270 radars on Hawaii prior to the Pearl Harbor attack ==
Army Major Kenneth Bergquist returned to Hawaii after attending the Mitchel Field school intending to set up a coordinated system, but when he arrived he found the local Army leadership was uninterested in the system, and he was reassigned to his former fighter unit. Only when incomprehensible equipment began appearing did the army return Bergquist from his fighter unit and tell him his job was to assemble the equipment when it arrived. The commander in charge of defending Hawaii, General Walter Short, had a faint grasp of the weapons and tactics that Army technologists (led by Hap Arnold) were aggressively pushing them to adopt. Except in rare cases, there was little interest in assisting or even cooperating with the goal of setting up the air defense system. On his own initiative, Bergquist along with some other motivated junior officers built a makeshift control center without authorization, and only by scrounging.

The first SR-270s became functional in July 1941 and, by November, Bergquist had only assembled a small team, but they were able to build a ring of four SCR-270-Bs around Oahu, with one unit in reserve. The radars were placed on the central north shore (Haleiwa), Opana Point (northern tip), in the northwest at the highest point- Mount Kaala, and one in the southeast corner at Koko Head. However, initially no real communications system or reporting chain was set up. At one point the operators of one of the sets were instructed to phone in reports from a gas station some distance away. Although communications were eventually improved, the chain of command was not. And by explicit order of General Short, the radar stations were to only be operated for four hours per day and to shut down by 7am each day. The one operational radar set in the Philippines, by contrast, was put on continuous watch in three shifts in response to the war warning sent to all overseas commands in late November.

=== Use on the morning of the Pearl Harbor attack ===
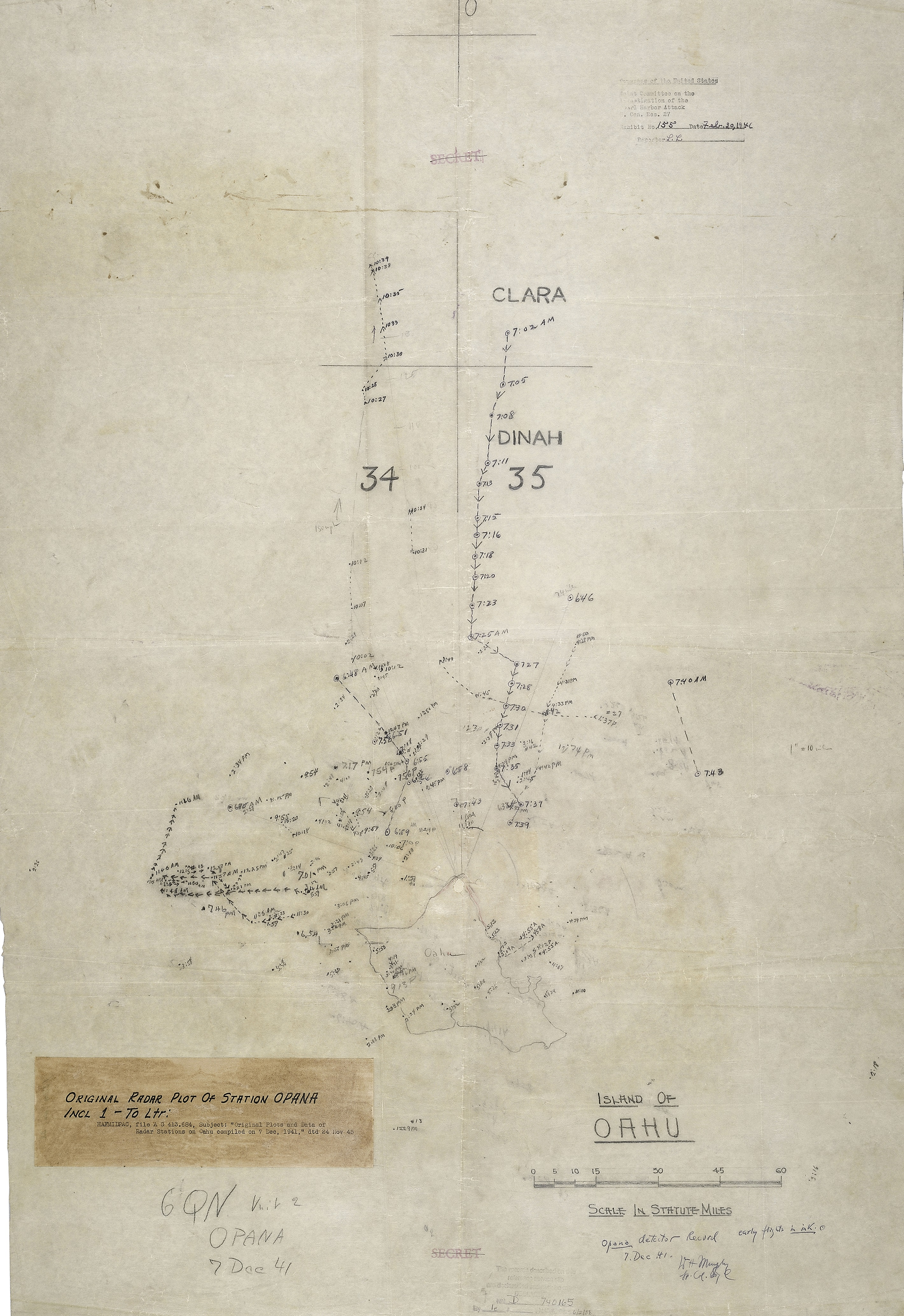
Plot made early on 7 December 1941, by SCR-270 operators at Opana

SCR-270 serial number 012 was installed at Opana Point, Hawaii on the morning of 7 December 1941, manned by two privates, George Elliot and Joseph Lockard. Though the set was supposed to shut down at 7 that morning, the soldiers decided to get additional training time since the truck scheduled to take them to breakfast was late. At 7:02 they detected aircraft approaching Oahu at a distance of 130 miles (210 km) and Lockard telephoned the information center at Fort Shafter and reported "Large number of planes coming in from the north, three points east". The operator taking his report passed on the information repeating that the operator emphasized he had never seen anything like it, and it was "an awful big flight."

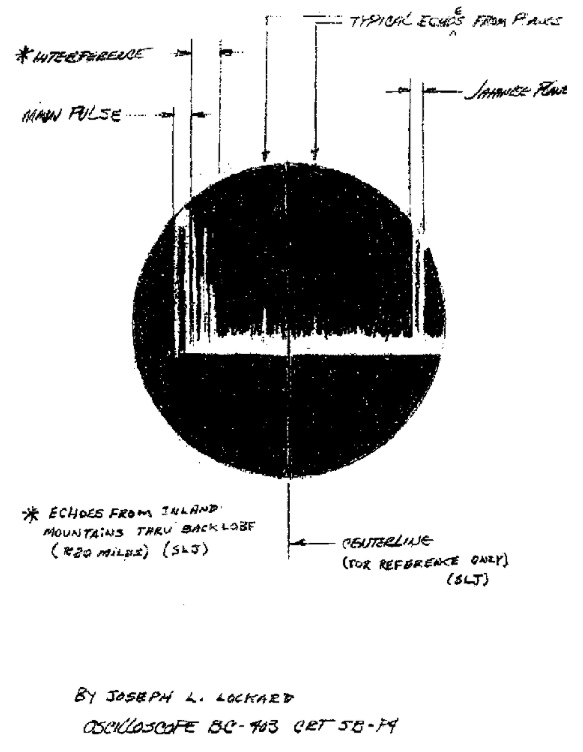
SCR-270 display showing Japanese planes approaching Oahu on 7 December 1941

The report was passed on to an inexperienced and incompletely trained officer, Kermit Tyler, who had arrived only a week earlier. He thought they had detected a flight of B-17s arriving that morning from the US. There were only six B-17s in the group, so this could not account for the large size of the radar echo. The officer had little grasp of the technology, the radar operators were unaware of the B-17 flight (nor its size), and the B-17s had no IFF (Identification friend or foe) system, nor any alternative procedure for identifying distant friendlies such as the British had developed during the Battle of Britain. The Japanese aircraft they detected attacked Pearl Harbor 55 minutes later, precipitating the United States' formal entry into World War II.

The northerly bearing of the inbound flight was not passed along in time to be of use. The US fleet instead fruitlessly searched to the southwest of Hawaii, believing the attack to have been launched from that direction. In retrospect this may have been fortuitous, since they might have met the same fate as the ships in Pearl Harbor had they attempted to engage the superior Japanese carrier fleet, with potentially enormous casualties.

=== Aftermath ===
The radars on Oahu were put on round-the-clock operation immediately after the attack. After the Japanese attack, the RAF agreed to send Watson-Watt to the United States to advise the military on air defense technology. In particular Watson-Watt directed attention to the general lack of understanding at all levels of command of the capabilities of radar, with it often being regarded as a freak gadget "producing snap observations on targets which may or may not be aircraft." Major and future general Gordon P. Saville, director of Air Defense at the Army Air Force headquarters referred to the Watson-Watt report as "a damning indictment of our whole warning service".

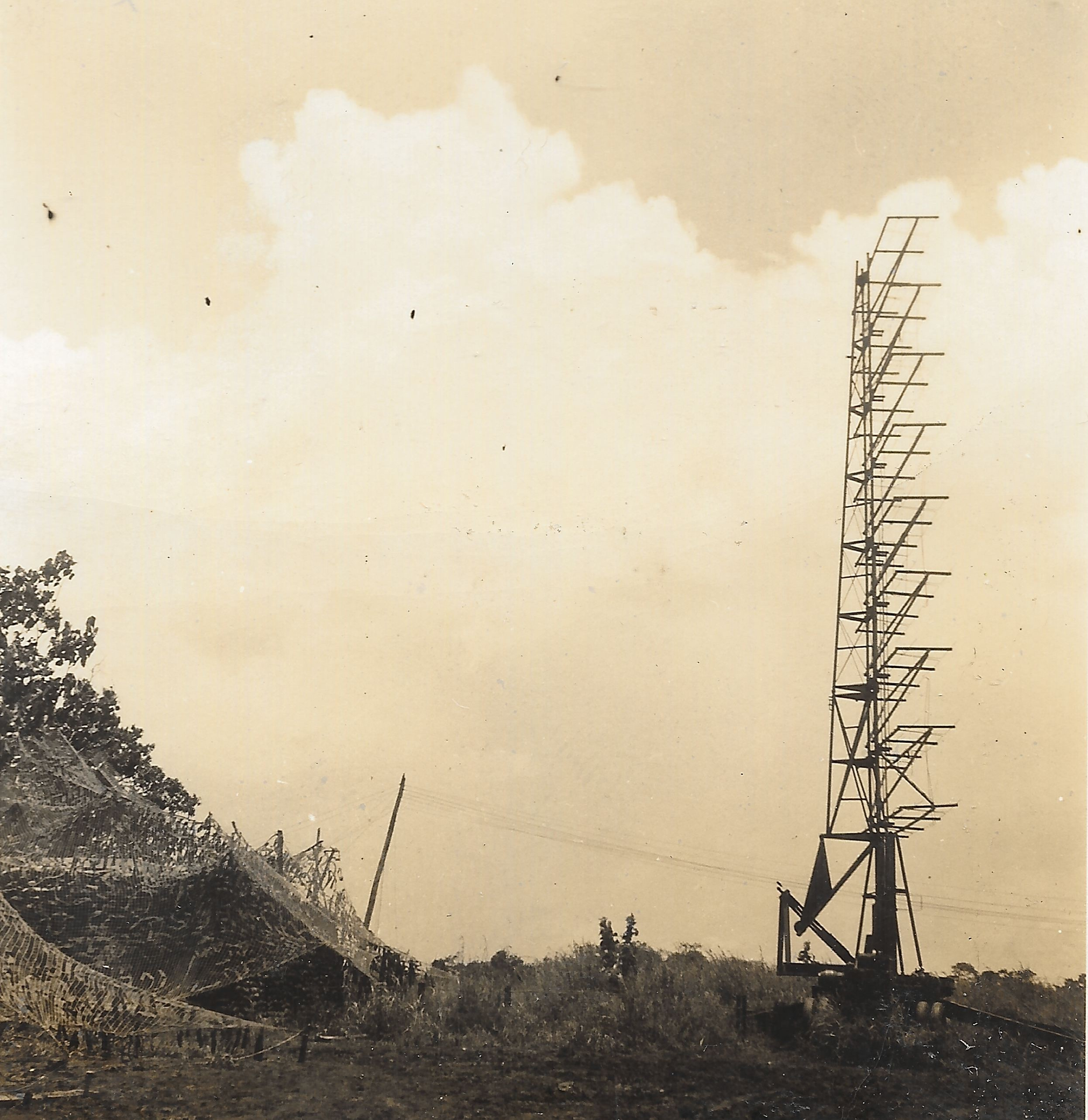
1942 photo of the SCR-270 utilized by the Marine Corps' Early Warning Detachment during the Battle of Guadalcanal.

== Use of SCR-270 radar elsewhere in World War II ==
=== Philippines ===
In the Philippines, the Far East Air Force did not fare much better than the defending air force at Pearl Harbor. " The first SCR-270 allotted to the Philippines arrived.. about 1 October. At once the men uncrated and assembled it... Fortunately, this first set gave so little trouble that Lt. C. J. Wimer and a detachment of thirty men shortly were able to take the radar to Iba, an airstrip on the coast about a hundred miles to the northwest of Clark Field. By the end of October the Iba radar was in operation...Within the next two weeks three more SCR-270 sets arrived at Manila, as well as two SCR-271's in crates...Within a few days Lieutenant Rodgers set out by boat for Paracale, Camerines Norte Province, Luzon, about 125 miles southeast of Manila on the coast of the Philippine Sea. He took with him one of the better mobile sets and one of the crated SCR-271's, planning to use the mobile set until the permanent site for the fixed radar could be made ready. Rodgers and his men got their 270 set up, and started preliminary test operation by 1 December...Doling out the remaining radars in the closing days of November Colonel Campbell sent Lieutenant Weden of the Signal Company Aircraft Warning to a site some forty-five miles south of Manila on Tagaytay Ridge. Weden drew the damaged set. Any hope that it might work better in this location soon faded; the set could not be made to operate satisfactorily, although it was still useful for training. About 3 December another Signal Corps officer, Lt. Robert H. Arnold, rushed the last remaining SCR-270 to Burgos Point on the extreme northern tip of Luzon. Arnold arrived at his location on the night of 7 December. A few days earlier, the Marine Corps unit at Cavite had informed Colonel Campbell that it had just received a radar set, but that no one knew how to operate it. This was an SCR-268 radar, a short-range searchlight-control set developed for the Coast Artillery and not intended as an aircraft warning set, although it was sometimes used as such. A Signal Corps crew hurried to Cavite and helped the marines take the set to Nasugbu, below Corregidor, and on the southwest coast of Luzon." https://archive.org/details/TheSignalCorpsTheTest/page/n25/mode/2upOn

29 November, in response to the war warning sent to all overseas commands, the radar detachment went on continuous watch in three shifts.[7]: 225 

Even with correct detection of enemy flights from the AAF's operational radar at Iba, command disorganization resulted in many of the defending fighters in the Philippines being also caught on the ground and destroyed, as was the largest concentration of B-17s (19) outside of the continental US. The Iba set was destroyed in the initial attack on Iba on 8 December. After the first day, the effective striking power of the Far East Air Force had been destroyed, and the fighter strength seriously reduced. The Marine unit was withdrawn to Bataan in January 1942, where it was successfully employed in conjunction with an SCR-268 antiaircraft gun-laying radar to provide air warning to a small detachment of P-40s operating from primitive fields.

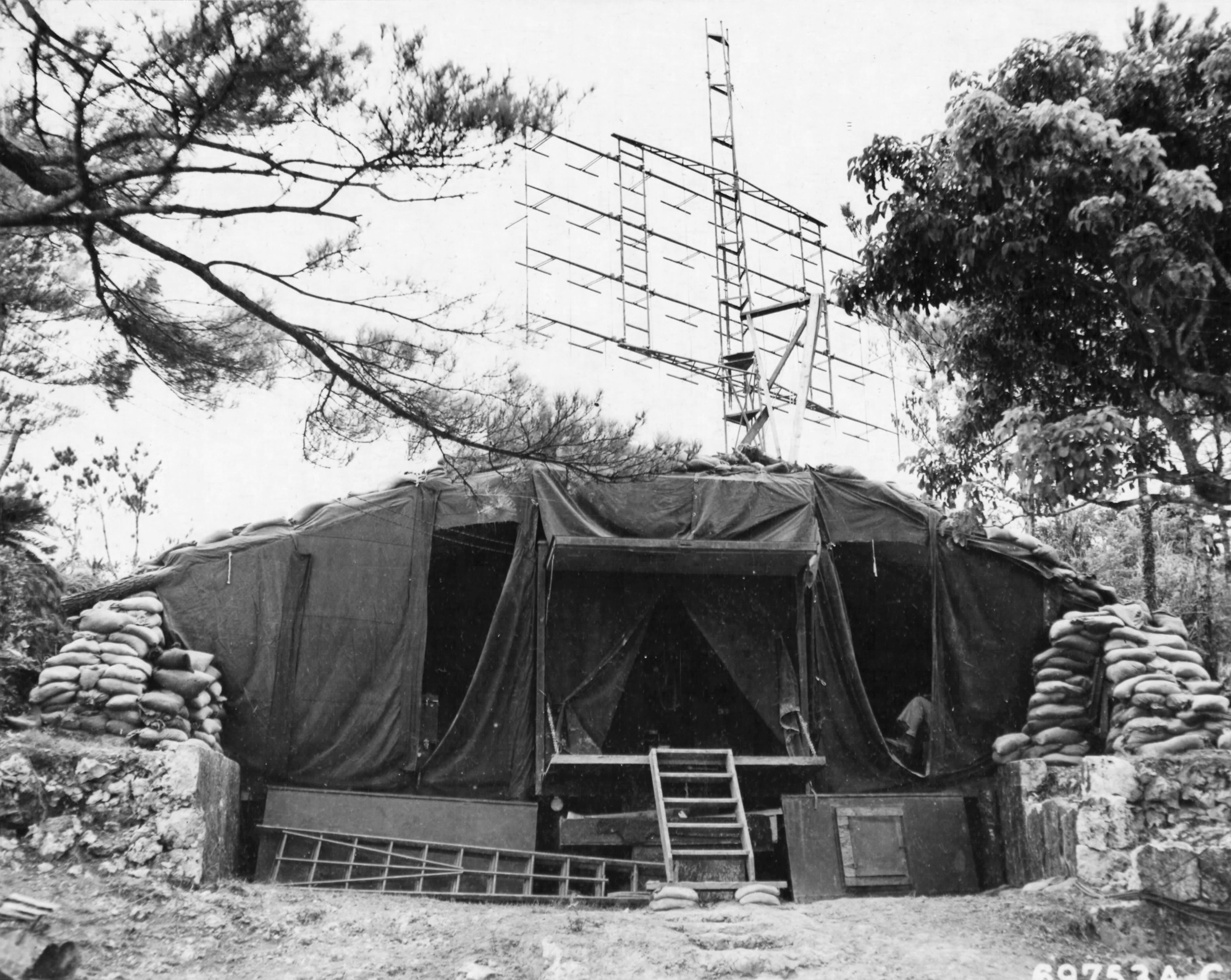
SCR-270 Radar from Air Warning Squadron 6 on Okinawa after the Battle of Okinawa.

Key commanders responsible for the defense of installations vulnerable to air attack did not appreciate the need for and capabilities of the air defense assets they had, and how vital radar was to those defenses. The vulnerability was well demonstrated in war games—in particular those of United States Navy Fleet Problem IX that annihilated the locks on the Panama canal, and Fleet Problem XIII, when the Pearl Harbor fleet was destroyed in a mock attack by 150 planes in 1932.

=== Midway ===
At Midway Island in June 1942, an SCR-270 antenna and shack were located at the western end of Sand Island. During the Battle of Midway, this radar was used to warn the island of incoming Japanese air attacks and to successfully direct the fighter interception that followed, but the island's radar did not play any significant part in the main carrier-action portion of the battle that followed.

=== Newfoundland ===
A series of five SCR-271-equipped early warning radar stations were constructed by the United States Army in the Dominion of Newfoundland in 1942 to protect NS Argentia, McAndrew AFB, Ernest Harmon AFB, and RCAF Torbay. The stations at Cape Spear (Prime), Elliston Ridge (Duo), St. Bride's (Trio), Fogo Island (Quad), and Allan's Island (Cinco), were manned by the 685th Air Warning Squadron under operational control of Newfoundland Base Command at Pepperrell Air Force Base.

== Technical description ==
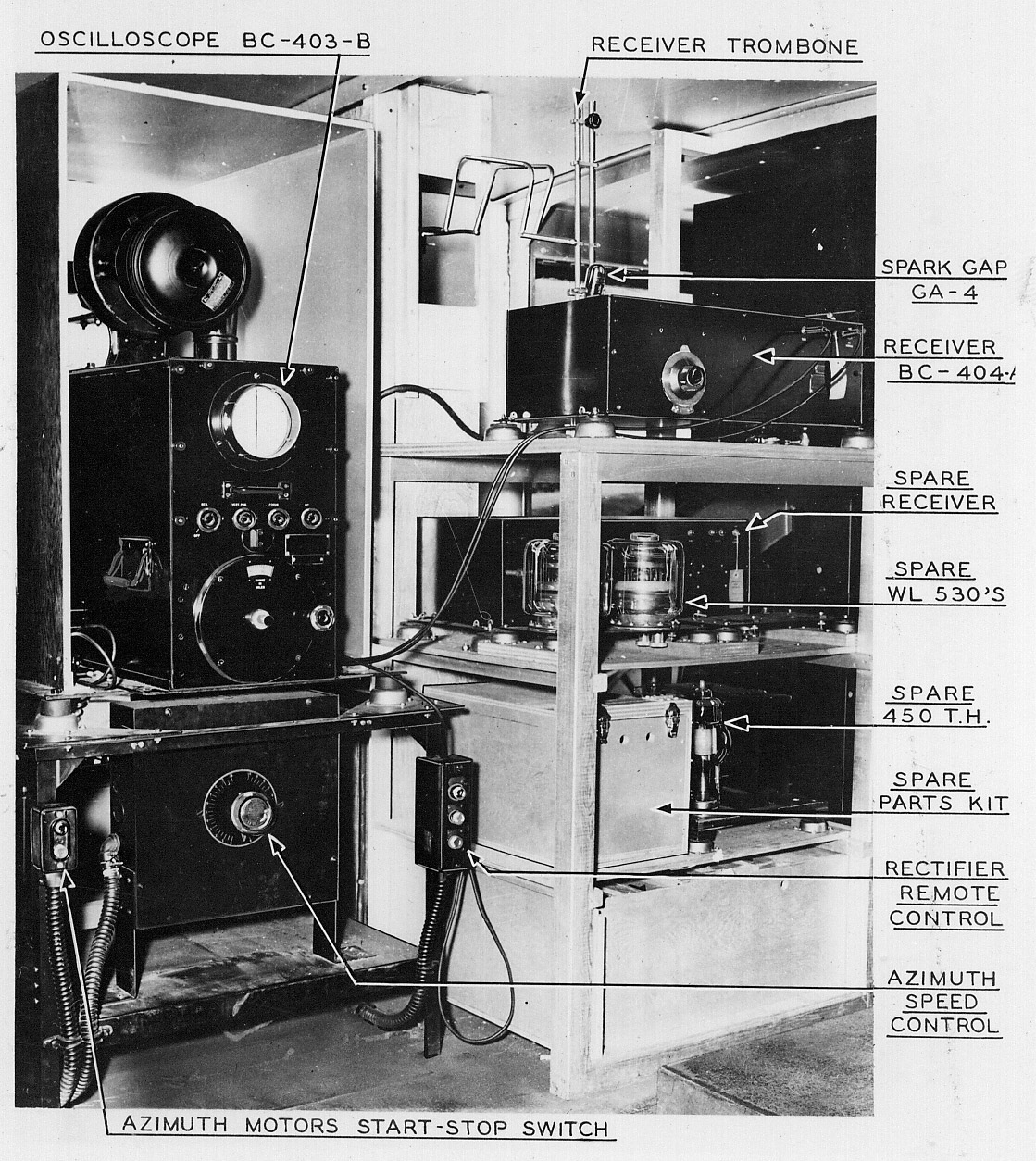
SCR-270 operations van components

Key to the SCR-270's operation was the primary water-cooled 8 kW continuous/100 kW pulsed transmitting tube. Early examples were hand-built, but a contract was let to Westinghouse in October 1938 to provide production versions under the Westinghouse designation "WL-530" and the Signal Corps type number "VT-122". A pair of these arrived in January 1939, and were incorporated into the first SCR-270 in time to be used in the Army's maneuvers that summer. Several improved components followed as the Army offered additional contracts for eventual production.

The original -270 consisted of a four-vehicle package including a K-30 operations van for the radio equipment and oscilloscope, a K-31 gasoline-fueled power-generating truck, a K-22B flatbed trailer, and a K-32 prime mover. The antenna folding mount was derived from a well-drilling derrick, and was mounted on the trailer for movement. When opened it was 55 feet (17 m) tall, mounted on an 8-foot (2.4 m) wide base containing motors for rotating the antenna. The antenna itself consisted of a series of 36 half wave dipoles backed with reflectors, arranged in three bays, each bay with twelve dipoles arranged in a three-high four-wide stack. (Later production versions of the SCR-270 used 32 dipoles and reflectors, either eight wide by four high (fixed) or four wide by eight high (mobile)).

In use, the antenna was swung (rotated) by command from the operations van, the azimuth angle being read by observing with binoculars the numbers painted on the antenna turntable. The maximum rotation rate was one revolution per minute. The radar operated at 106 MHz, using a pulse width from 10 to 25 microseconds, and a pulse repetition frequency of 621 Hz. With a wavelength of about 3 meters (nine feet), the SRC-270 was comparable to the contemporary Chain Home system being developed in Great Britain, but not to the more advanced UHF Würzburg radars being developed in Germany. This wavelength did turn out to be useful, as it is roughly the size of an airplane's propeller, and provided strong returns from them depending on the angle. Generally it had an operational range of about 150 miles (240 km), and consistently picked up aircraft at that range. A nine-man field operating crew consisted of a shift chief, two oscilloscope operators, two plotters, two technicians, and two electricians.

The declassified US military document "U.S. Radar – Operational Characteristics of Available Equipment Classified by Tactical Application" gives performance statistics for the SCR-270-D, namely "maximum range on a single bomber flying at indicated heights, when set is on a flat sea level site":

Maximum range at indicated height of aircraft
Altitude	1,000 ft (300 m)	5,000 ft (1,500 m)	20,000 ft (6,100 m)	25,000 ft (7,600 m)
Range	20 mi (32 km)	50 mi (80 km)	100 mi (160 km)	110 mi (180 km)

=== Components ===
Components of the SCR-270 system included the following:

==== Transmitter BC-785 ====
The transmitter used dual WL530 water-cooled triodes configured as a high power push-pull resonant-line oscillator. The grids of the WL530s were connected to the keyer output which provided a high negative bias voltage that was interrupted by 621 Hz pulses which drove the WL530s' grids to conduction, thereby allowing a pulse of RF to be produced. The transmission line to the antenna was connected to taps on the filament resonant lines.

==== Keyer BC-738 ====
As described above, the keyer/modulator produced a grid bias voltage for the transmitter tubes that keeps them in cutoff except for brief positive pulses the keyer produces 621 times a second, The 621 Hz frequency is derived either from an internal oscillator or an external source, typically the oscilloscope. The keyed output stages consisted of two 450TH power triodes in series, with the final stage configured as a cathode follower.

==== Receiver BC-404 ====
The receiver is a superheterodyne design, with a high-power 832 dual tetrode as its first RF amplifier and a RCA 1630 orbital-beam hexode electron-multiplier amplifier tube as the second RF amplifier stage. The local oscillator included a front panel tuning adjustment. The receiver sensitivity control was remotely located on the oscilloscope. The two RF and four 20 MHz IF amplifier stages could produce enough gain to fill the oscilloscope display screen with noise.

==== Transmit-receive (TR) switch ====
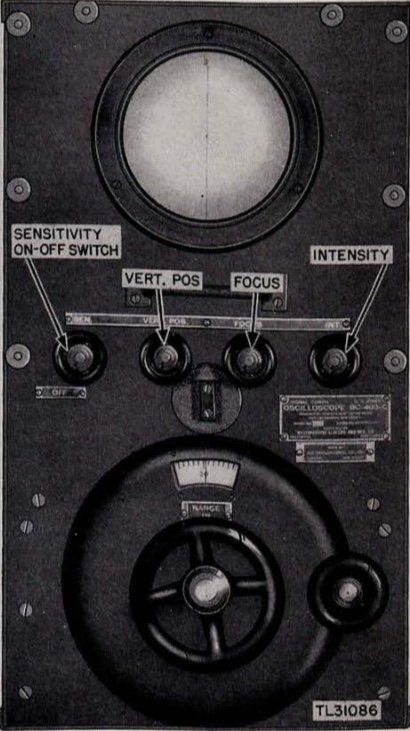
BC-403-C oscilloscope

A key innovation in the SCR-270 was a transmit-receive (TR) switch. The SCR-268 searchlight control radar, which shared much technology with the SCR-270, used separate antennas for transmit and receive, For maximum antenna gain at a given size it is desirable to use the same antenna for both functions. One obstacle is the need to protect the receiver from the high power pulses produced by the transmitter. This was solved by placing a spark gap across a "trombone" tuned section of transmission line. The high-voltage power pulses would create a spark, short circuiting the line and creating a resonant stub that prevented most of the pulse energy from reaching the receiver.

==== Oscilloscope display BC-403 ====
The oscilloscope (A-scope) display employed a five-inch diameter 5BP4 cathode-ray tube, the same type used in the first commercial RCA television set, the TRK-5, introduced in 1939. The sweep was normally generated from an internal 621 Hz oscillator that also drove the keyer, but an external source could be used. The sweep signal passed through a calibrated phase shifter controlled by a large hand wheel on the front panel. The delay between the transmitted and received pulses could be measured accurately by placing the transmit pulse under a hairline on the screen and then adjusting the hand wheel so that the received pulse was under the line.

==== High Voltage rectifier RA60-A ====
Two high power WL-531 rectifier tubes provided adjustable plate voltage, up to 15 kV at 0.5 A, to the transmitter. Because of pulsed nature of the transmitter, the small amount of filtration was needed.

==== Water cooler RU-4A ====
The RU-4 circulated triple-distilled cooling water through the WL530 high power triodes and cooled the return water with a blower. Triple-distilled water was used to minimize leakage current from the high voltage on the tubes' anodes.

==== Antenna control unit BC-1011 ====
Later units incorporated an antenna steering control system that could sweep a sector repetitively. Still later systems added additional controls to rotate the antenna at 5 RPM for use with a plan position indicator, like modern radars.

==== Generator ====
The generator was driven by a LeRoi gasoline engine and could produce 15 KVA of electric power.

== Preservation ==
After its use by the military, the Pearl Harbor unit (s/n 012) was loaned to the University of Saskatchewan in Saskatoon (along with a second unit to the National Research Council in Ottawa), who, unaware of its history, used it to image aurora for the first time in 1949. The technique was published in 1950 in Nature, and was a field of active research for some time. In 1990, after the radar had sat derelict for years, they received a phone call informing them of the historical nature of the radar, and requesting it be sent back to the US for preservation. It is now located at the National Electronics Museum near Baltimore. A second unrestored unit is in the US Army Air Defense Artillery Museum collection at Fort Sill and will be undergoing restoration in 2020.

== See also ==
- List of U.S. Signal Corps Vehicles
- Signal Corps Radio
- G-numbers
- AN/CPS-4 Radar height finder used with SCR-270
- Project Diana
