= Joseph McDonald =

Joseph or Joe McDonald may refer to:

- Joseph A. McDonald (1866–1930), American businessman influential in the steel industry
- Joseph E. McDonald (1819–1891), U.S. Representative and Senator from Indiana
- Joseph P. McDonald (1919–1994), U.S. Army Air Corps private instrumental in the Imperial Japanese Navy Air Service's attack on Pearl Harbor
- Country Joe McDonald (1942–2026), lead singer of the 1960s psychedelic rock group Country Joe & the Fish
- Joe McDonald (baseball executive) (1929–2026), American front office executive in American Major League Baseball
- Joe McDonald (footballer) (1929–2003), Scottish footballer who played for Sunderland and the Scotland national football team
- Joe McDonald (politician) (born 1966), Minnesota state representative and master photographer
- Joe McDonald (third baseman) (1888–1963), Major League Baseball third baseman who played in 1910 with the St. Louis Browns
- Joe McDonald (mobster) (1917–1997), Irish-American gangster of the Winter Hill Gang

== See also ==
- Joseph Macdonald (disambiguation)
