= Joseph MacDonald =

Joseph MacDonald or Macdonald may refer to:

- Joseph MacDonald (Antigonish politician) (1824–?), politician in Nova Scotia, Canada
- Joseph Macdonald (Cape Breton politician) (1863–1942), lawyer and politician in Nova Scotia, Canada
- J. Farrell MacDonald (John Farrell MacDonald, 1875–1952), American character actor and director sometimes billed as Joseph Farrell Macdonald
- Joseph MacDonald (cinematographer) (1906–1968), American cinematographer
- Joseph Faber MacDonald (1932–2012), Canadian Roman Catholic bishop
- Joe MacDonald (architect), Canadian-born American architect, researcher and professor

== See also ==
- Joseph McDonald (disambiguation)
