= St. Bride's Radar Station =

USA WW2 Radar Station

St. Bride's Radar Station
- Part of United States General Surveillance Radar
- Newfoundland
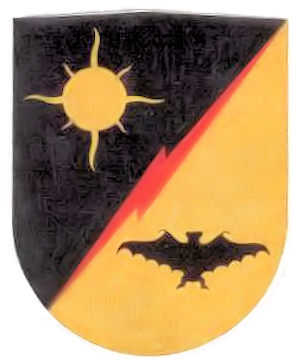
- Emblem of the 685th Air Warning Squadron

Site information
- Type: Radar Station
- Code: Trio
- Controlled by: Newfoundland Base Command

Location
- Coordinates: 46°55′54.7″N 054°10′49.2″W

Site history
- Built: 1942
- Built by: United States Army
- In use: 1943-1945

Garrison information
- Garrison: 685th Air Warning Company

Location of St. Bride's Radar Station, Newfoundland

St. Bride's Radar Station was a United States Army General Surveillance Ground Radar Early Warning Station in the Dominion of Newfoundland. It was built during World War II and responsible for monitoring air traffic from Naval Station Argentia to RCAF Torbay and into the Atlantic Ocean. It was located in St. Bride's, 135 kilometres (84 mi) southwest of St. John's. It was closed in 1945.

== History ==
The site was established in 1942 as a United States Ground Radar Early Warning Station, funded by the United States Army, which stationed the 685th Air Warning Squadron on the site under operational control of Newfoundland Base Command at Pepperrell Air Force Base. Fifty-two members (three officers and 49 enlisted men) of the 685th were assigned to St Bride's. It operated an SCR-271 manned early-warning radar with information sent by radio to a plotting center at Pepperrell AFB to track aircraft. St Bride's was the third of a chain of four stations around the Newfoundland coast and was accordingly given the radio code name of "Trio". The station was assigned to Royal Canadian Air Force on 1 November 1944, and was given designation "No 41 RU". The RCAF operated the station until 7 October 1945.

== United States Army Air Forces units and assignments ==
Units:

- 685th Air Warning Company, 1943

Inactivated November 1944

Assignments:

- Newfoundland Base Command, Winter 1943
