= Allan's Island Radar Station =

Ground Radar Early Warning station

Allan's Island Radar Station
- Part of United States General Surveillance Radar
- Newfoundland
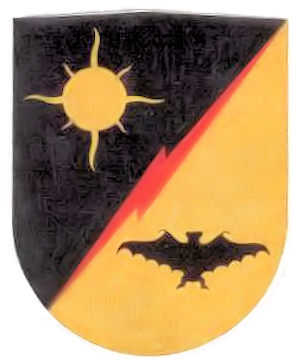
- Emblem of the 685th Air Warning Squadron

Site information
- Type: Radar Station
- Code: Cinco
- Controlled by: Newfoundland Base Command

Location
- Coordinates: 46°50′52.8″N 055°48′17.4″W

Site history
- Built: 1942
- Built by: United States Army

Garrison information
- Garrison: 685th Air Warning Company

Location of Allan's Island Radar Station, Newfoundland

Allan's Island Radar Station (Cinco) was a United States Army General Surveillance Ground Radar Early Warning Station in the Dominion of Newfoundland. It was built during World War II and responsible for monitoring air traffic from Naval Station Argentia to Gander and into the Gulf of St. Lawrence. It was located on Allan’s Island 250 kilometres (160 mi) southwest of St. John's. It was closed in 1945.

== History ==
The site was established in 1942 as a United States Ground Radar Early Warning Station, funded by the United States Army, which stationed the 685th Air Warning Squadron on the site under operational control of Newfoundland Base Command at Pepperrell Air Force Base. The station was assigned to Royal Canadian Air Force in November 1944, and was given designation "No 40 RU". The RCAF operated the station until November 1, 1945.

It operated an SCR-270 manned Early-warning radar.

== United States Army Air Forces units and assignments ==
Units:

- 685th Air Warning Squadron, 1943

Inactivated November 1944

Assignments:

- Newfoundland Base Command, Winter 1943
