= Elliston Ridge Air Station =

General Surveillance Gap Filler Radar station

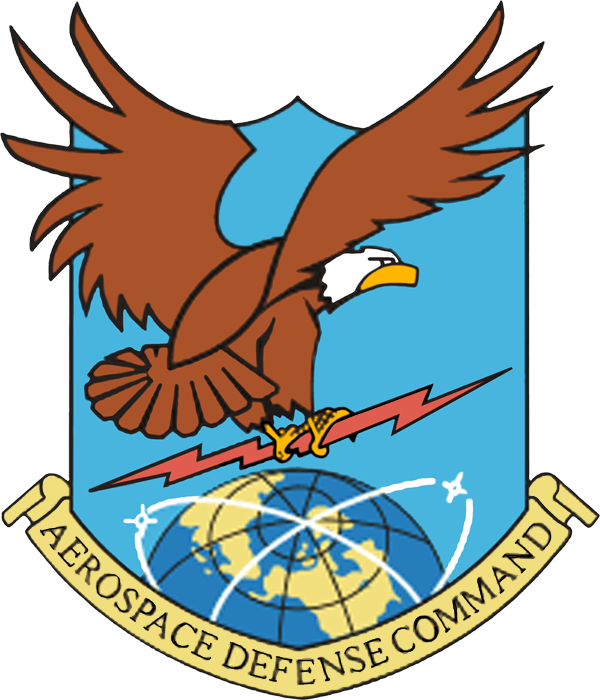
Elliston Ridge Air Station
- Part of Pinetree Line
- Newfoundland, Canada
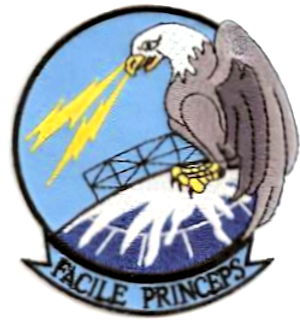
- Emblem of the 642d Aircraft Control and Warning Squadron

Site information
- Type: Radar Station
- Code: N-22B
- Controlled by: Aerospace Defense Command

Location
- Coordinates: 48°37′33″N 053°03′31″W

Site history
- Built: 1957
- Built by: United States Air Force
- In use: 1957–1961

Elliston Ridge Radar Station
- Part of United States General Surveillance Radar
- Newfoundland
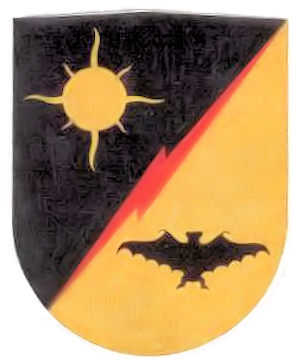
- Emblem of the 685th Air Warning Squadron

Site information
- Type: Radar Station
- Code: Duo
- Controlled by: Newfoundland Base Command

Site history
- Built: 1942
- Built by: United States Army
- In use: 1943–1945

Garrison information
- Garrison: 685th Air Warning Company

Location of Elliston Ridge Air Station, Newfoundland

Elliston Ridge Air Station (ID: N-22B, C-22B) was a General Surveillance Gap Filler Radar station in the Canadian province of Newfoundland and Labrador, It was located 74 miles (119 km) north-northwest of St. John's. It was closed in 1961.

== History ==
The site was established in 1943 as a United States Army anti-aircraft spotting station (Codename: Duo) with an SCR-271 early warning radar. Fifty-two members (three officers and 49 enlisted men) of the 685th Air Warning Company were stationed at Elliston from winter 1943 to November 1944.

In 1957 a manned Gap Filler radar station was constructed, funded by the United States Air Force, under operational control of Red Cliff Air Station and part of Pinetree Line of Ground-Control Intercept (GCI) radar sites.

The station was assigned to Aerospace Defense Command in 1957, and was given designation "N-22B" (later "C-22B)." Aerospace Defense Command stationed the 642d Aircraft Control and Warning Squadron at the station in 1957. It operated an AN/FPS-14 manned Gap Filler search radar.

== USAF units and assignments ==
Units:

- 642d Aircraft Control and Warning Squadron, 1957

Inactivated 1 October 1961

Assignments:

- 4731st Air Defense Group, 1 April 1957
- Goose Air Defense Sector, 6 June 1960 – 1 October 1961
