= William Parker (builder) =

Masonic builder, shipowner and shopkeeper

William Parker (1800–1854) was a St. John's masonic builder, shipowner and shopkeeper who along with partner Nicholas Croke built the National Historic Cape Spear lighthouse starting in 1834 or 1835. The Cape Spear lighthouse is the oldest surviving lighthouse in Newfoundland and Labrador and the most easterly building in North America.

William Parker married Margaret Gleeson on December 1, 1831, in St. John's. He later owned a brig named Margaret Parker after his wife.

Members of the Parker family were prominent businessmen in St. John's, Newfoundland for nearly two centuries. William's son James Francis Parker founded Parker & Monroe, Ltd. in 1880 which was the largest shoe store on the island for many years. It had several retail outlets and manufactured 100,000 pairs of shoes per year in its plant on Alexander St. Most of the shoes were sold to Newfoundlanders.
