= Cape Spear =

Cape in Newfoundland and Labrador, Canada

- Cape
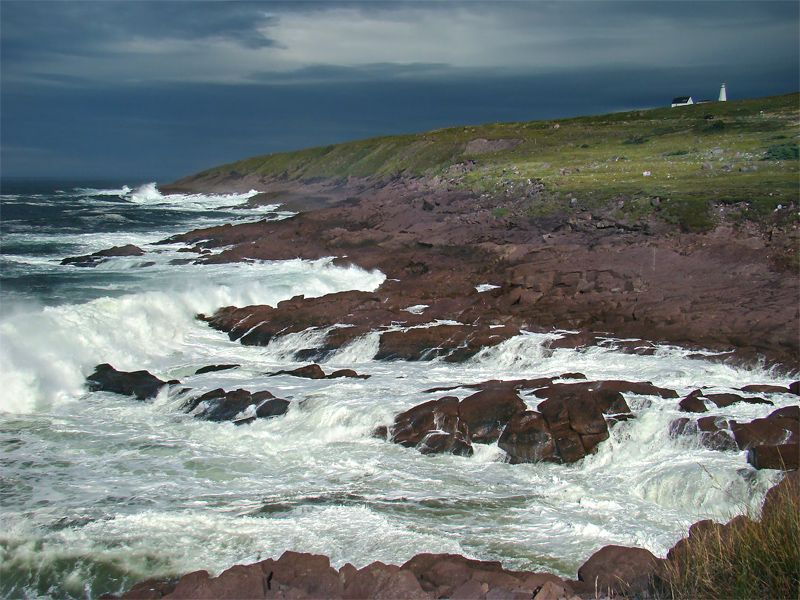

- Location within Newfoundland Location within Canada Location within North America
- Coordinates: 47°31′25″N 52°37′10″W
- Location: Newfoundland, Canada
- Elevation: 75 m (246 ft)
- Topo map: NTS 1N10 St. John's
- Current light
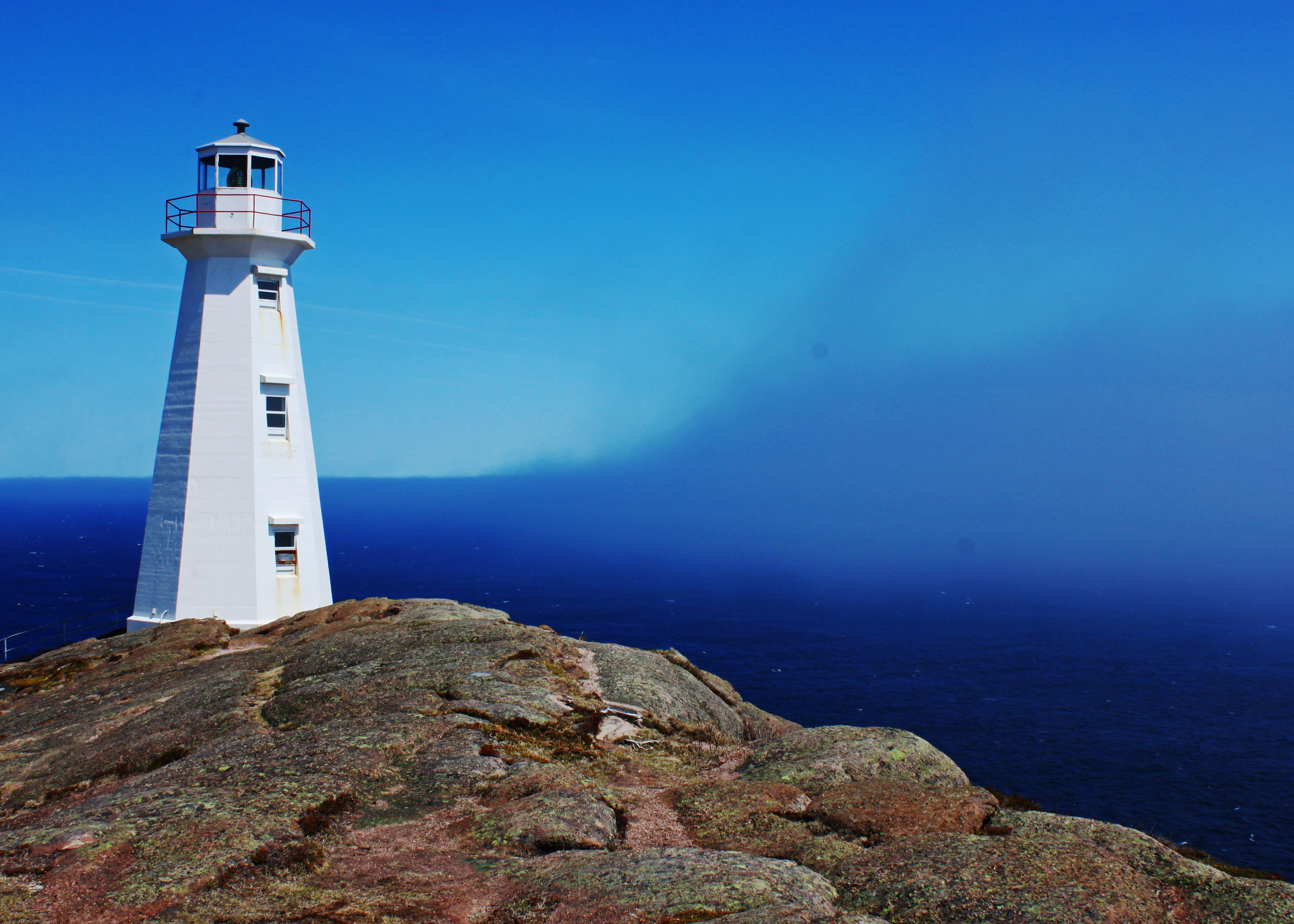
- Constructed: 1955
- Construction: concrete
- Height: 13.7 m (45 ft)
- Markings: White (tower), white (lantern), red (guard rail)
- Operator: Parks Canada
- Heritage: recognized federal heritage building of Canada
- Focal height: 71 m (233 ft)
- Range: 20 nmi (37 km; 23 mi)
- Characteristic: Fl(3) W 15s
- Original light
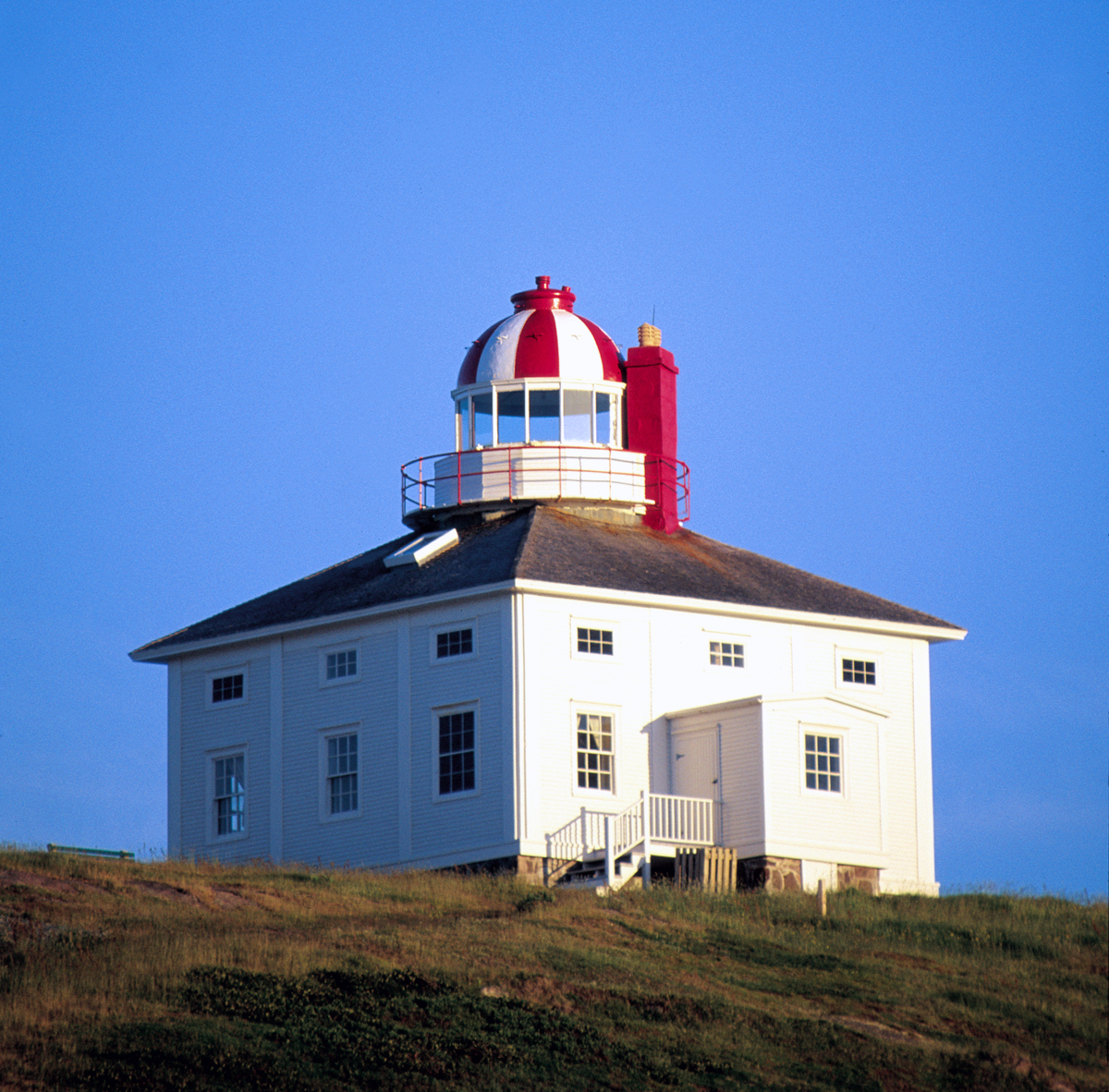
- Constructed: 1836
- Construction: limestone
- Markings: White (tower), white (lantern), red and white (dome)
- Heritage: national Historic Sites of Canada, classified federal heritage building of Canada, heritage lighthouse
- Deactivated: 1955

Cape Spear (French: Cap d'Espoir) is a headland located on the Avalon Peninsula of Newfoundland near St. John's in the Canadian province of Newfoundland and Labrador. At a longitude of 52°37' W, it is the easternmost point in Canada and North America excluding Greenland.

Cape Spear is within the municipal boundaries of the city of St. John's, located about 12 kilometres (7.5 mi) from downtown St. John's.

The Portuguese named this location Cabo da Esperança, meaning "cape of hope", which became Cap d'Espoir in French and finally "Cape Spear".

Cape Spear is the trailhead/trail end for two components of the East Coast Trail.

== History ==
The Cape Spear region was originally inhabited by Beothuk peoples. Additionally, Mi'kmaq communities practiced a non-sedentary presence in the area, harvesting subsistence resources on a temporary basis prior to permanent residency at settlements such as St. George's Bay and Conne River from the nineteenth century onwards. In contrast to European settlers who viewed the cape as a place of significance as the easternmost point in Canada, there is no known archaeological evidence to indicate that Cape Spear was viewed by local Indigenous communities as a place of symbolic geographical importance. According to Fife and Roseman, historically there are "no indications that either the Beothuk or the Mi'kmaq equated Cape Spear with a 'land's end' that was meaningful to them."

=== World War II ===
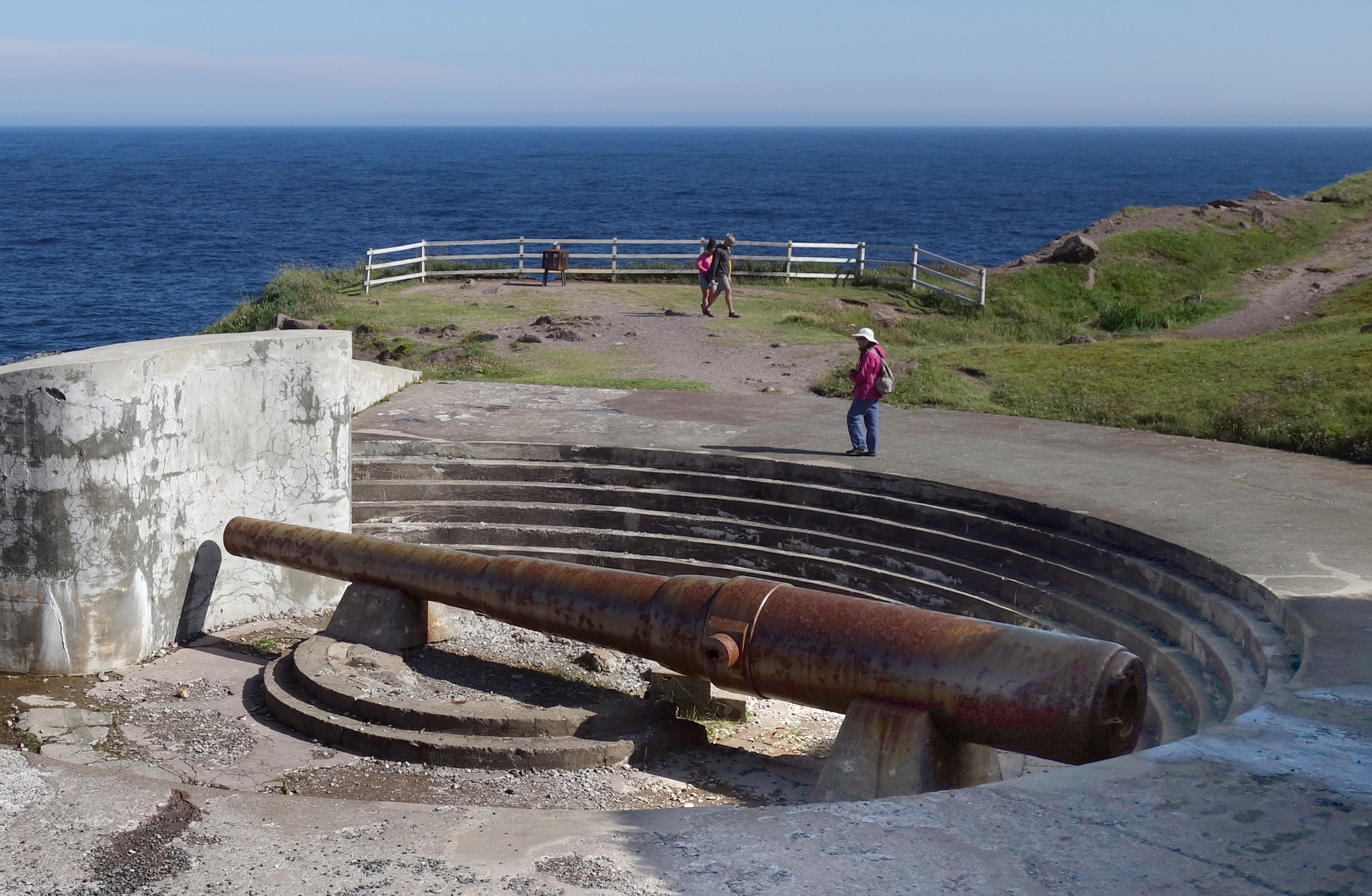
World War II battery

Because of its proximity to convoy routes during the Second World War, a Canadian-manned gun battery including two Lend-Lease ex-US 10-inch M1888 guns on disappearing carriages was installed at Cape Spear to defend the entrance to St. John's harbor. Barracks and underground passages leading to the bunkers were built for the use of troops stationed there. The gun barrels remain in place. The bunkers and gun barrels that are located at the site afford a sheltered view of the ocean.

== Lighthouses ==
A lighthouse has operated at Cape Spear since September 1836. The original Cape Spear lighthouse was the second lighthouse built in Newfoundland; the first was built in 1810 at Fort Amherst, at the entrance to St. John's Harbour. In 1832, the first legislative assembly for the colony created a lighthouse board. Cape Spear was chosen as the site for a new lighthouse because it was on the rocky eastern coast near the entrance to St. John's harbor.

Nicholas Croke and William Parker, two St. John's builders, won the contract for the lighthouse and work began in 1834 or early in 1835. The first lighthouse was a square wooden building with a tower in the middle containing the light. A foghorn was added in 1878. The first light used at Cape Spear had already been used since 1815 at a lighthouse on Inchkeith on the east coast of Scotland. The original light used seven Argand burners and curved reflectors. This was later replaced by a dioptric lens system; the light was first lit by oil, then acetylene, and finally electricity in 1930.

A new concrete lighthouse was built in 1955, and the original light was moved to the new building.

=== Lightkeepers ===
In 1835, dense fog enveloped an approaching warship carrying a VIP visitor to St. John's. The Governor sent out several pilot boats, and a young harbour pilot names James Cantwell succeeded in locating the ship and guiding it safely into harbour. Asked what reward he would like, he requested the job of keeper at the Cape Spear lighthouse, then under construction. It had been promised to another man, Emmanuel Warre, but when Warre died ten years later Cantwell became the second keeper. He served for 35 years; his son Dennis, who had been his assistant, later took over and, with two intermissions, the Cantwell family kept the Cape Spear light for over 150 years.

List of Keepers
Name	Years
Emanuel Warre	1836–1846
James Cantwell	1846–1879
Austin Oke Sheppard	1880–1886
Dennis Cantwell	1886–1909
James Cantwell	1909–1918
William Cantwell	1918–1925
Jack Cantwell	1925–1939
Weston Cantwell	1939–1944
Frank Cantwell	1944–1965
Martin Hefferan	1965–1982
Gerald Cantwell	1982–1997

=== National Historic Site ===
The original Cape Spear lighthouse is the oldest surviving lighthouse in Newfoundland and the location has been designated a National Historic Site of Canada. The original lighthouse building and the lightkeeper's residence have been restored to the period of 1839, and are open to the public. The visitor centre includes a gift shop. The lighthouse was designated under the federal Heritage Lighthouse Protection Act in June 2016.

Some visitors attracted by the scenery and history have been swept away by the large and unpredictable waves at Cape Spear, prompting Parks Canada to post numerous warning signs in the area.

== Radar Station ==
Cape Spear Radar Station
- Part of United States General Surveillance Radar
- Newfoundland
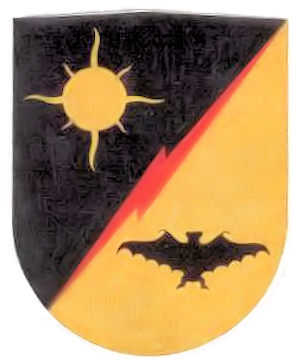
- Emblem of the 685th Air Warning Squadron

Site information
- Type: Radar Station
- Code: Prime
- Controlled by: Newfoundland Base Command

Site history
- Built: 1942
- Built by: United States Army
- In use: 1943–1945

Garrison information
- Garrison: 685th Air Warning Company

Cape Spear Radar Station (Prime) was a United States Army General Surveillance Ground Radar Early Warning Station in the Dominion of Newfoundland. It was built during World War II and responsible for monitoring air traffic from RCAF Torbay and into the Atlantic Ocean. It was closed in 1945.

The site was established in 1942 as a United States Ground Radar Early Warning Station, funded by the United States Army, which stationed the 685th Air Warning Company on the site under operational control of Newfoundland Base Command at Pepperrell Air Force Base. Three officers and 49 enlisted men of the 685th were assigned to Cape Spear. It operated an SCR-271 manned Early-warning radar with information sent to a plotting center at Pepperrell AFB to track aircraft. The station was assigned to Royal Canadian Air Force in November 1944, and was given designation "No 42 RU". The RCAF operated the station until June 20, 1945.

=== United States Army Air Forces units and assignments ===
Units:

- 685th Air Warning Squadron, 1943

Inactivated November 1944

Assignments:

- Newfoundland Base Command, Winter 1943

== See also ==
- Cape St. Charles, the easternmost point of mainland North America
- List of lighthouses in Newfoundland and Labrador
- Heritage Lighthouse Protection Act
