= Joe MacDonald (architect) =

Canadian-born American designer

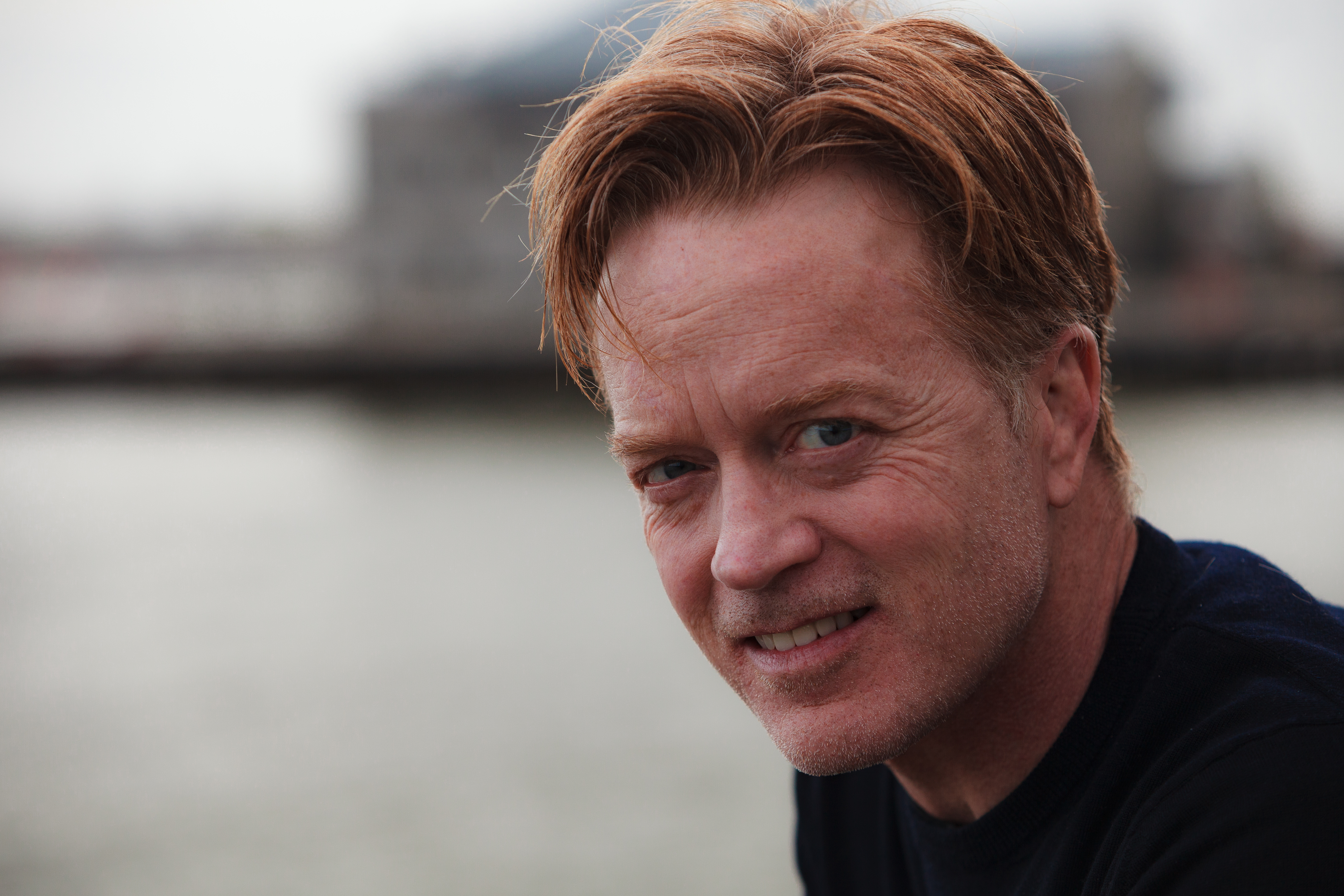
- Born: Canada
- Education: University of Washington; Harvard University
- Occupations: Architect, Researcher, Professor, Climate Activist
- Years active: 2004–present
- Organization(s): Urban A&O
- Notable work: The Bone Wall; The Water Planet; Johnson & Johnson's Olympic Games Pavilion and Project Energos

Joe MacDonald is a Canadian-American architect, researcher and professor. He is most known for his work on The Bone Wall, The Water Planet, Johnson & Johnson's Olympic Games Pavilion and Project Energos. He founded Urban A&O, a design firm in 2004 and now serves as its Executive Director.

MacDonald uses parametric modeling tools of CATIA-based software combined with digital fabrication processes to produce sculptural and geometrically complex forms and environments. He has received several research grants and awards, including four consecutive research grants from Harvard Graduate School of Design, China's Most Successful Design Award, Vanguard Award "Top 10 Emerging Firms from around the World" by Architectural Record, and the Outstanding Property Award, London (OPAL) Platinum Award, Property Development, Environmental, Sustainable for Project Energos, in Nevada.

== Early life and education ==
MacDonald was born in Canada. He completed his B.A. in architecture, environmental design, from University of Washington in 1987. In 1992, he received his M.Arch. I AP from Harvard University after briefly studying at the Architectural Association in London under Zaha Hadid. His master's thesis was titled Navigable Sites: Toronto Island Airport.

== Career ==
MacDonald joined Harvard University as an assistant professor in 2000. In 2004, while teaching at Harvard University, he founded Urban A&O, a boutique design firm specializing in advanced computational design work. Through the firm he started working on residential, commercial and exhibition design projects. In the same year, he became an associate professor at the Harvard University Graduate School of Design.

MacDonald collaborated with sound artists O+A on an installation called Blue Moon. As part of the installation, three tuning tubes were installed in the North Cove Harbor, which created melodies and chords in response to ambient noise on the Hudson River. The sound was then played back through five cube loudspeakers.

MacDonald designed The Bone Wall, a solo exhibition at the Storefront for Art and Architecture, in 2006. The Bone Wall was supported by the Harvard Graduate School of Design and became one of MacDonald's early well known works.

In 2006, MacDonald collaborated with Thinc to design Water Planet, a multi-media aquarium experience at California Academy of Sciences. The Water Planet is shaped by an aggregate of seven walls surrounding three interactive islands. The seven walls house exhibits that illustrate a variety of evolutionary adaptations of life to water. MacDonald designed the fiberglass walls to resemble waves and the effect of an underwater experience. Openings in these walls provide windows to various aquarium tanks.

ArtDaily reviewed the Water Planet and wrote that "Constructed using new technologies for computer-aided design and fabrication, the complex molded surfaces seemingly flow into one another, inviting touch and creating an immersive, watery setting." In its review, the San Francisco Chronicle wrote that "when the lights are dimmed and images of kelp and underwater life are projected onto the cases, viewers get the feeling of being fully submerged."

In 2008, he designed the Johnson & Johnson's Olympic Games Pavilion for the Beijing Olympics. The pavilion was surrounded by a bamboo forest that sheltered its guests and housed The Caring World, an exhibition exploring how people care for each other and the world. The exhibition highlighted the views of individuals through storytelling, documentary video and photo exhibition. The project China's Most Successful Design Award and LEED Gold recognition award.

Through his firm Urban A&O, MacDonald was the lead architect for the 400th Henry Hudson anniversary exhibition in 2009.

MacDonald left Harvard University in 2010. His research at Harvard was focused on advanced and emerging computational developments into parametric modeling. He has also received several other grants for his research on social patterns within dense urban environments. MacDonald has regularly incorporated his academic research into practice, most notably in his projects, The Bone Wall and Cairo Tower.

MacDonald has designed urban and residential development planning projects in China and India. He has also worked with Audi, General Electric and Metropolis magazine as an architect. He regularly speaks at industry conferences around the world and was a speaker at TED 2006. He has lectured extensively on the relationship between architecture and technology. In 2010, he was recognized by Cambridge Who's Who for "demonstrating dedication, leadership and excellence in architecture and design."

From 2017 to 2021, Joe MacDonald served on the Weitzman School of Design's faculty at University of Pennsylvania, offering the final 700-series travel studio, to Dubai, Stockholm, Copenhagen and Oslo. His focus in studio aligns with his research-based practice, net-zero and carbon neutral design solutions.

== Awards and honors ==
MacDonald has received following awards and honors:

- 2008: New Practices New York from the New York Chapter of the AIA
- 2008: Architecture Magazine's Vanguard award
- 2009: IDEA International Design Excellence Silver Award for Environments for the Water Planet
- 2009: China's Most Successful Design Award for the Johnson & Johnson Olympic Pavilion in Beijing
- 2009: Good Design Award
- 2009: Archi-tech AV Award for the Water Planet
- 2009: LEED Gold recognition award for Johnson & Johnson Olympic Pavilion in Beijing
- 2009: LEED Double Platinum Recognition for Water Planet
- 2020: Project Energos Wins Platinum 2020 Outstanding Property Award London In Property Design.
- 2021: OPAL Platinum Award, Property Development, Environmental, Sustainable for Project Energos, in Nevada
- 2021: Novum Design Award
- 2021: ICONIC Award, Innovation, German Design Council
- 2022: Urban A&O won the Most Innovative Sustainable Design Firm

== Bibliography ==
- 2006 – Studio Works 10, Editor
- 2006 – Studio Works 11 (Graduate School of Design, Studio Works), Editor
