= Opana Radar Site =

- U.S. National Register of Historic Places
- U.S. National Historic Landmark
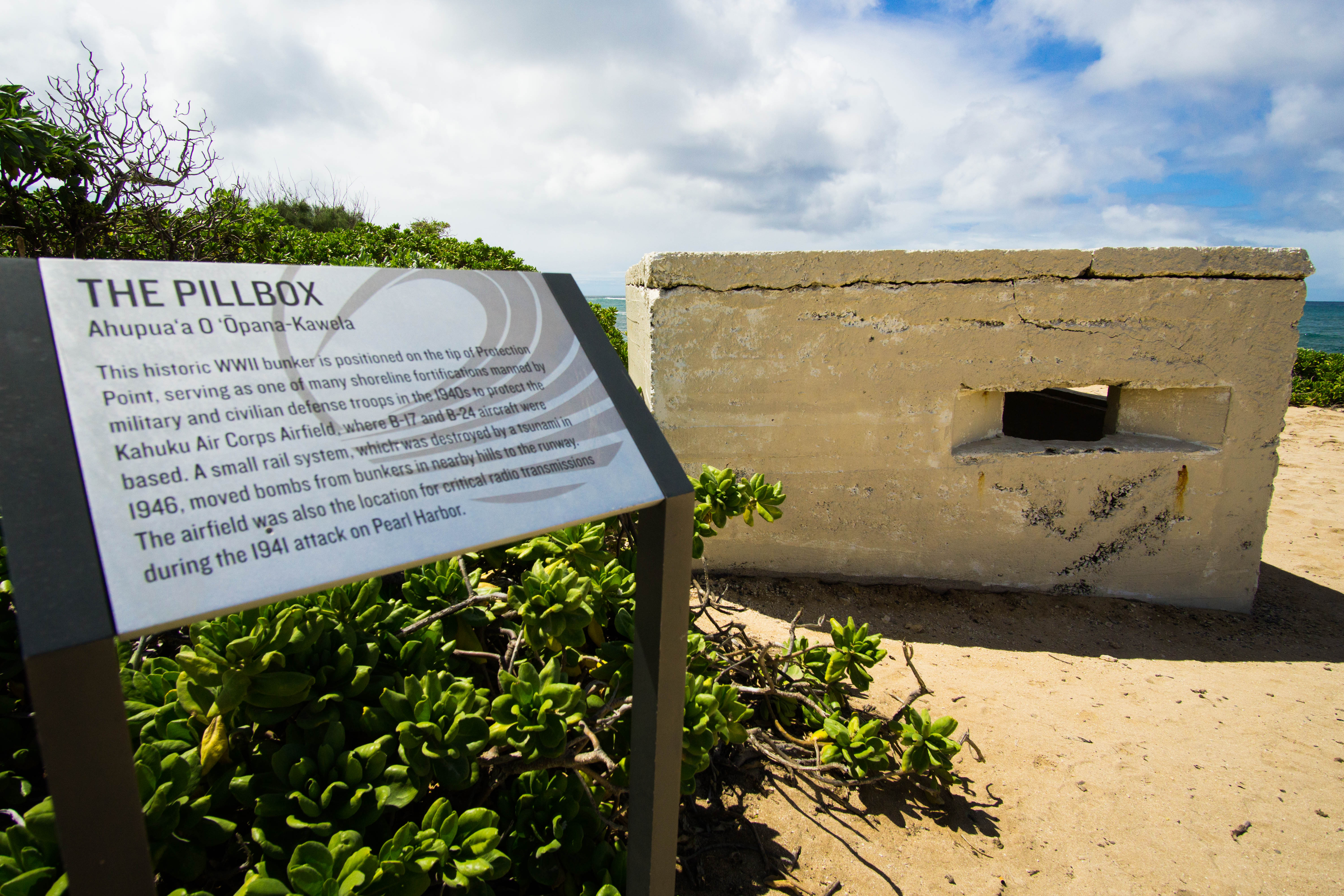

- Location within Hawaii
- Location: Kawela Bay, Hawaii
- Coordinates: 21°41′8″N 158°0′36″W
- Area: less than one acre
- Built: 1941
- NRHP reference No.: 91001379

Significant dates
- Added to NRHP: September 19, 1991
- Designated NHL: April 19, 1984

The Opana Radar Site is a National Historic Landmark and IEEE Milestone that commemorates the first operational use of radar by the United States in wartime, during the attack on Pearl Harbor. It is located off the Kamehameha Highway just inland from the north shore of Oahu, Hawaii, south of Kawela Bay. It is not open to the public.

== History ==
In December 1939, the U.S. military established an Aircraft Warning Service (AWS) using radar to defend American territory. It employed the SCR-270 radar, the first United States long-range search radar created at the Signal Corps laboratories at Fort Monmouth, New Jersey, circa 1937. The radar's operating frequency was 106 megahertz and it had a maximum range of 150 miles, or greater if the equipment was at an elevated site.

Under the command of Col. Wilfred H. Tetley the AWS established six mobile radar detector sites on O'ahu at Kawaiola, Wainaae, Kaʻaʻawa, Koko Head, Schofield Barracks, and Fort Shafter. On Thanksgiving Day in 1941, the Schofield Barracks radar set was moved to the Opana Radar Site, a location 532 feet above sea level with an unobstructed view of the Pacific Ocean. The set comprised four trucks carrying the transmitter, modulator, water cooler, receiver, oscilloscope, operator, generator and antenna.

== Attack on Pearl Harbor ==
On December 7, 1941, the Opana Radar Site was manned by Private Joseph Lockard and Private George Elliot, who detected approaching aircraft at 7:02 am (past the end of the site's scheduled operating day). Since the truck to take them to breakfast was late, the pair continued to practice with the radar equipment.

The men reported their findings to the temporary information center at Fort Shafter. Private Joseph McDonald took the call. McDonald found Lt Kermit Tyler when he entered the plotting room when he timed the message. Tyler told him that it was nothing. McDonald called back the Opana Radar site and spoke to Pvt Joseph Lockard. Lockard was excited, he had never seen so many planes. Infected with Lockard's excitement, McDonald returned to Tyler. McDonald suggested to Tyler to call back the plotters and notify Wheeler Field of the sighting. When Tyler again indicated that it was nothing, McDonald insisted that Tyler talk to Lockard directly. The information center staff had gone to breakfast and Tyler received the report. Tyler reasoned that the activity was a flight of Army B-17 Flying Fortress bombers, and advised the radar crew not to worry. Tyler told investigators that a friend in the Bomber group advised him that whenever the radio station played Hawaiian music all night, a flight from the mainland was arriving, and using that for navigation homing. McDonald was relieved at about 7:40 and returned to his tent waking his tent mate up by saying "Shim the Japs are coming". Elliot and Lockard continued plotting the incoming planes until 7:40 when contact was lost. Shortly before 8:00 am they headed to Kawailoa for breakfast and only learned about the attack when they arrived. Elliot and Lockard rushed back to Opana and operated the radar until the attack ended.

== Today ==
Today, a modern Navy telecommunications station occupies the top of the Opana Hill adjacent to the site. The station is a relay for the Department of State's Diplomatic Telecommunications Service. The former site is a National Historic Landmark and IEEE Milestone. Since the 1941 radar was a mobile unit, there is no physical evidence of the historic unit at the site. There is a commemorative plaque on the grounds of the Turtle Bay Resort at the foot of Opana Hill.

== See also ==
- List of IEEE Milestones
