= Kermit Tyler =

Recipient of the Legion of Merit (1913–2010)

Kermit Arthur Tyler
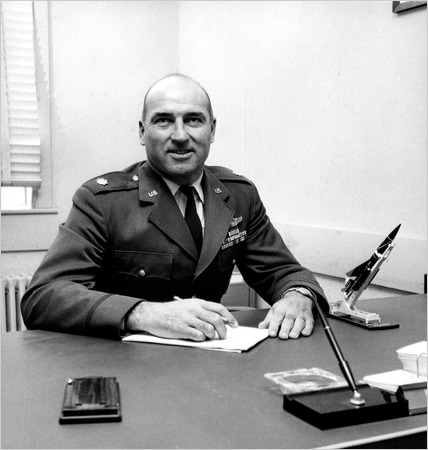
- Born: April 13, 1913; Oelwein, Iowa
- Died: January 23, 2010 (aged 96); San Diego, California
- Military career
- Allegiance: United States of America
- Branch: United States Air Force
- Service years: 1936–1961
- Rank: Lieutenant Colonel
- Unit: 78th Pursuit Squadron
- Conflicts: World War II: Pearl Harbor
- Awards: Legion of Merit
- Other work: Real Estate Broker

Kermit Arthur Tyler (April 13, 1913 – January 23, 2010) was an American Air Force officer. Tyler was assigned as a pilot in the 78th Pursuit Squadron at Pearl Harbor on December 7, 1941, the day Japan attacked Pearl Harbor.

== Biography ==
Tyler was born on April 13, 1913, in Oelwein, Iowa. He moved with his family to Long Beach, California, and joined the Civilian Conservation Corps for two years before becoming an Army Air Corps flying cadet in 1936.

== Pearl Harbor ==
On December 7, 1941, Tyler was a first lieutenant in the Army Air Corps serving as the Executive Officer of the 78th Pursuit Squadron, based at Pearl Harbor. That morning he was assigned duty as the Officer In Charge of the partly activated Pearl Harbor Intercept Center. His duties were to assist the controller in ordering American planes to intercept unknown aircraft approaching Pearl Harbor.

Tyler, new and untrained, was warned by Private Joseph P. McDonald of the approach of a large flight of aircraft from the north. He presumed it to be the scheduled arrival of six B-17 bombers from the mainland. In fact, the radar operators were tracking Japanese planes coming to attack the base. However the operator, working in training mode, failed to make clear the size of the formation even though it was larger than anything they had ever seen, and he did not pass on an alarm of "attack imminent”.

Following an investigation by a Naval Board of Inquiry in August 1942, it was determined that Tyler had been assigned to the Information Center with little or no training, no supervision, and no staff with which to work. Tyler was subsequently cleared of any wrongdoing by the Board, and no disciplinary actions were taken against him.

== Later life ==
Tyler retired as a lieutenant colonel in the United States Air Force in 1961. After leaving military service, he obtained a business degree and worked as a real estate broker. He died in San Diego, California of pneumonia on January 23, 2010, at the age of 96.
