= 685th Aircraft Control and Warning Squadron =

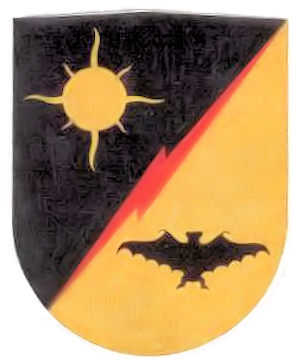
- Emblem of the 685th Aircraft Control and Warning Squadron
- Active: 1950-1963
- Country: United States
- Branch: United States Air Force
- Type: General Radar Surveillance

The 685th Aircraft Control and Warning Squadron is an inactive United States Air Force unit. It was last assigned to the Oklahoma City Air Defense Sector, Aerospace Defense Command, stationed at Las Cruces Air Force Station, New Mexico. It was inactivated on 1 August 1963.

The unit was a General Surveillance Radar squadron providing for the air defense of the United States.

== Lineage ==
- Established as 685th Aircraft Control and Warning Squadron

Activated on 27 November 1950
Inactivated on 6 February 1952

- Activated on 1 December 1953

Discontinued on 1 August 1963

Assignments

- 544th Aircraft Control and Warning Group, 27 November 1950 - 6 February 1952
- 4702d Defense Wing, 1 December 1953
- 34th Air Division, 1 January 1954
- Albuquerque Air Defense Sector, 1 January 1960
- Oklahoma City Air Defense Sector, 15 September 1960
- 4752d Air Defense Wing, 1 September 1961
- Oklahoma City Air Defense Sector, 25 June 1963 - 1 August 1963

Stations

- Norton AFB, California, 1 January 1951 - 6 February 1952
- Geiger Field, Washington, 1 December 1953
- Kirtland AFB, New Mexico, 1 January 1954
- Las Cruces AFS, New Mexico, 1 December 1954 – 1 August 1963
