= Harold Webb =

American astronomer and academic (1909–1989)

Harold Donivan Webb (1909–1989) was a physicist and a professor of electrical engineering at the University of Illinois, Urbana-Champaign. In 1946, he was one of the members of the US Army Signal Corps Project Diana team at Camp Evans, New Jersey, that was the first to bounce radar signals off of the Moon. Dr. Webb continued research on ionosphere, moon reflection and radio astronomy at the University of Illinois. One of his daughters, Diana, was named after the Project.

The significance of the Diana Project was two-fold. First, it proved that radio waves could penetrate the Earth's ionosphere, a feat that had never before been accomplished. Second, it proved that the echo of a radar beam could be received on Earth, providing a new way to observe and measure objects in space beyond direct observation through a conventional telescope. Project Diana was the beginning of radioastronomy and the space age.

== Early years ==
Harold Donivan Webb was born September 23, 1909, in Johnson County, Indiana, near Franklin, Indiana. He was the youngest of five sons of Guilford and Bertha Owens Webb. Webb's father was a farmer, and his mother was a teacher prior to marriage. As a boy and later as a college student, Webb worked on his father's farm. Webb received his A. B. degree cum laude from Franklin College, Indiana in 1931, majoring in math and minoring in physics. He received his A.M. degree in physics from Indiana University in 1932, and his Ph.D. degree in physics from Indiana University in 1939.

== Early career ==
In the early 1930s, Webb taught mathematics, general science, physics, and chemistry. In 1939 he became Head of the Mathematics and Science Department at West Liberty State Teacher's College, West Liberty, West Virginia (now West Liberty University).

After the start of World War II, Webb left West Liberty College in 1942 to take a wartime civil-service position at the U.S. Army Signal Corps Evans Signal Laboratory (then called Camp Evans Radar Laboratory) at Camp Evans, Ft. Monmouth, New Jersey. His job title was “Electrical Engineer;” he worked on several research and development projects involving wartime uses of radar and improving radar equipment. After the Battle of the Bulge in 1944, Webb worked on a project to develop a jammer to disable V-T fuses. After V-J Day, in August, 1945, Webb joined a new research project at Evans Signal Laboratory, called Project Diana.

== Project Diana ==
At the end of Second World War, the Director of the Evans Signal Laboratory, Lt. Col. John H. DeWitt Jr., was interested in peacetime uses of wartime equipment. He proposed that if radar signals could be reflected from the surface of the Moon, perhaps a commercial use could be developed for broadcasting television signals. He code-named the venture Project Diana after the Roman goddess of the Moon.

The Project Diana team was led by Dewitt. The principal members were Chief Scientist Edwin King Stodola, Radio Engineer Herbert Kauffman, Radio Engineer Jacob Mofenson, and Electrical Engineer Webb. The project used re-purposed radar equipment housed in temporary shacks and a large “bedspring” antenna located near the Marconi Building at Camp Evans. On January 10, 1946, the team successfully bounced a radio signal off the Moon and detected the resulting echo (Earth-Moon-Earth communication or EME). Webb and Kauffman were staffing the equipment at that time, and were the first to hear the echo. Because of skepticism of other scientists and military officials, the Diana Project members were required to sign a notarized statement that they had, in fact, heard echoes from the Moon.

Webb's work on Project Diana was key to its success. Besides the improvements to the equipment that he developed, Webb was instrumental in determining how to propagate radio waves that could reach the Moon. Webb felt that his two main contributions to Project Diana were to recognize that the equipment needed to be modified to better take into account the Doppler effect of the returning radio beam, and that better results could be obtained at moonrise due to the greater antenna gain over the ocean at that time.

Project Diana functionally marked the birth of radar astronomy, and the beginning of the space age. It also established the naming convention for space exploration; for decades, all subsequent space exploration projects were named based on Greek or Roman mythology (Apollo, Mercury, Gemini, etc.). Before the success of Project Diana, it was thought by many scientists that it would be impossible to penetrate the outer layers of the Earth's atmosphere and ionosphere with radio waves to reach into outer space. The echoes heard by Webb and his colleagues were the first that humans had contacted an object beyond the confines of Earth. The application of radar astronomy to conduct space exploration and space travel became immediately apparent.

Since 1946, mapping of astronomical objects has been done with radar. The basic technique of bouncing radio signals off of distant bodies is still used to gather data about the geological and dynamic properties of many of the Solar System's planets. Additionally, the technique has been used to determine the scale of the Solar System itself.

The Diana Project made headlines in all the major newspapers of the day, was written up in magazines, and became part of the post-war popular culture. The project was used to sell Pepsi and other products, and was featured in a newsreel shown at movie theaters across the country. Webb was even featured in a science-themed news comic book. A 70th Anniversary celebration of Project Diana's success occurred in 2016. A 75th Anniversary celebration occurred on January 10, 2021.

== Later career ==
In 1947 Webb took a position as a Professor of Electrical Engineering at the University of Illinois Urbana-Champaign. He taught at both the undergraduate and graduate level. He also worked with the university's radio astronomy department. He retired in 1977 after 30 years of teaching and research and was an emeritus professor until his death.

Following his move to the University of Illinois, Webb continued his research on lunar reflections. In 1957, he directed a new project to collect and analyze data received from radar signals transmitted from Camp Evans and reflected from the Moon. Webb took sabbatical leave in 1968 to participate in research at the 1000 ft. antenna at Arecibo Observatory in Puerto Rico.

Webb was the author or co-author of many technical reports. He held a patent for a wave signaling system.

== Memberships and awards ==
Webb received an Alumni Citation Award from Franklin College in 1961. In 1971, Webb received an Undergraduate Instructional Award for teaching electronic circuitry. In 1974 he received the Everitt Award for Teaching Excellence from the university's College of Engineering. On July 28, 2018, Webb was posthumously honored when he was inducted into the Camp Evans "Wall of Honor."

Webb was a Fellow of the American Association for the Advancement of Science, a Senior Member of the Institute of Electrical and Electronics Engineers, and a member of the American Geophysical Union, the American Physical Society, the Indiana Academy of Science, the International Union of Radio Science, and Sigma Xi, Tau Beta Pi, and Eta Kappa Nu honorary societies.

== Personal life ==
He married Margaret Hougham on August 15, 1937, in Johnson County. Webb and his wife had four children: Stephen, Patricia (Muirhead), Sharon (Sticha), and Diana, who was named for the project for which Webb was most famous. Diana Webb is the co-author of the 2012 Handbook of Environmental Engineering Assessment.

== Death ==
Webb died on May 25, 1989, at his home in Urbana, Illinois. He is buried in Greenlawn Cemetery in Franklin, Indiana.

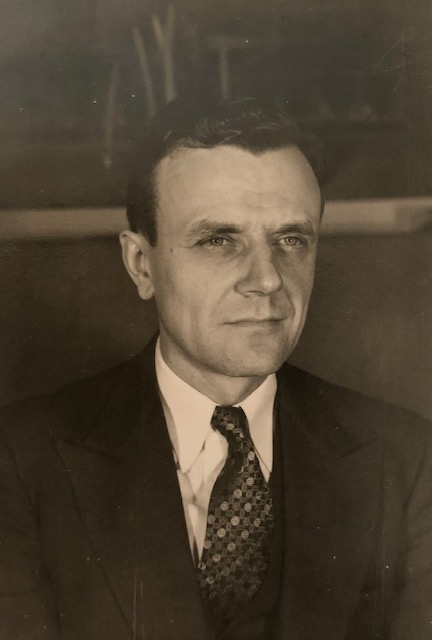
Dr. Harold D. Webb

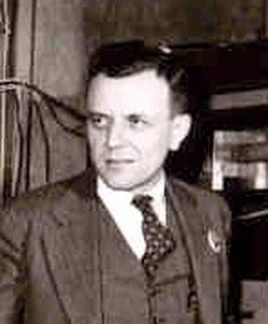
Harold Webb

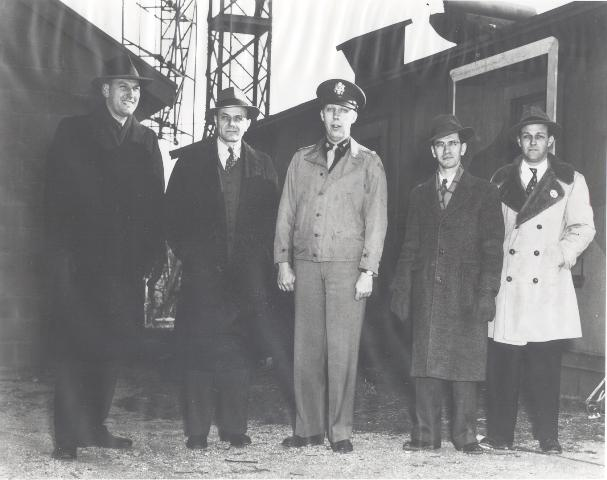
Harold Webb, second from left

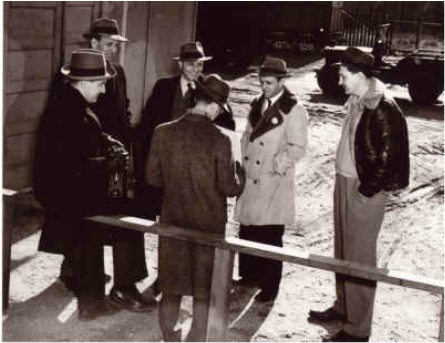
Harold Webb, in background facing camera

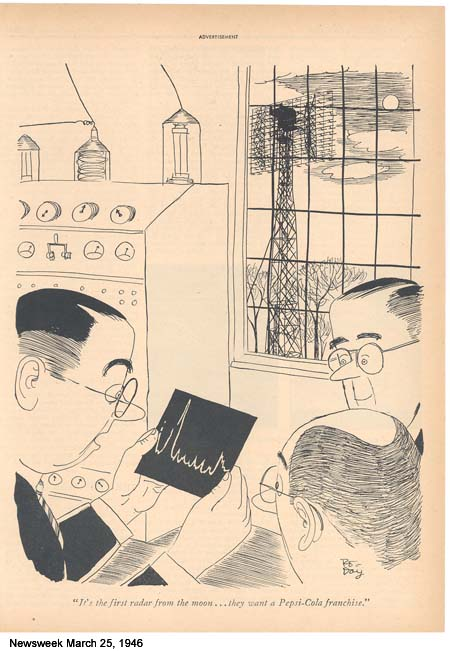
Cartoon, Newsweek

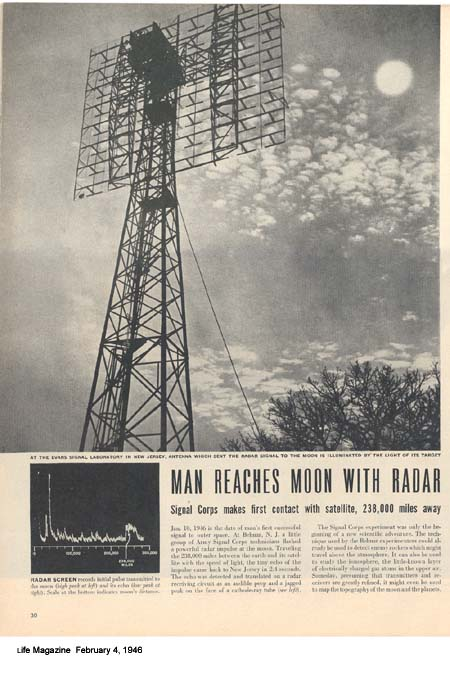
Antenna, Life magazine
