= Edwin King Stodola =

American radio engineer (1914-1992)

Edwin King Stodola (October 31, 1914 – April 6, 1992) was an American radio engineer.

He was born in Brooklyn, New York, to Edwin S. Stodola, a concert pianist, and F. Beatrice King, an elocutionist. He graduated from Cooper Union with a Bachelor of Electrical Engineering in 1936 (EE '36) and a Professional Degree in Engineering in 1947 (PDE '47). In 1936, he worked with Radio Engineering Laboratories, then he joined the U.S. Signal Corps in 1939 as a civilian radio engineer. Starting in 1941, and continuing through World War II, he worked at the Evans Signal Laboratory near Belmar, New Jersey. During this period he was responsible for developing radar to thwart Kamikaze strikes by eliminating the radar "blind spot" produced by flying close to the horizon.

Following the War, Stodola was a member of Project Diana, a Signal Corps project to investigate long range radar. Led by John H. DeWitt, Jr., this group consisted of a five-man team with Stodola as the chief scientist. During a test on January 10, 1946, this team became the first to bounce a radio signal off the Moon and detect the resulting echo (Earth-Moon-Earth or EME).

He left the Signal Corps in 1947 and became an engineer with Reeves Instrument Corporation. In 1971, Reeves entered Chapter 11 bankruptcy. After working as a consultant for the Syracuse University Research Corporation in Syracuse, NY and later for the Dikewood Corporation in Albuquerque, NM, he accepted a position at the Electronic Warfare (EW)Laboratory in Fort Monmouth, NJ, where he remained until his retirement in 1983.

Stodola was elected a fellow of the Institute of Radio Engineers (IRE; now the Institute of Electrical and Electronics Engineers; IEEE) in 1961. He received the Presidential Citation from Cooper Union in 1987 in recognition of his contributions to radar and radar tracking systems, and the Radio Club of America's prestigious Armstrong Medal in 1991. A licensed radio amateur (W2AXO) since childhood, he was inducted posthumously into the CQ Amateur Radio Hall of Fame in 2011. In 2017 a posthumously-awarded plaque was mounted on the InfoAge Science History Learning Center “Wall of Honor” citing his contributions to Project Diana and the development of long-range radar.

He was married to Elsa Dahart in 1939. The couple had a son, Robert King, and three daughters, Cynthia, Leslie, and Sherry. Following Elsa’s death in 1965, he married Rose Balaban in 1968.
