= Moon bounce =

Moon bounce may mean:

- Earth-Moon-Earth communication
- Communication Moon Relay, a 1950s US Navy project
- Inflatable castle, children's recreational structure
