= Jack DeWitt =

Jack DeWitt may refer to:

- John H. DeWitt Jr. (1906–1999), American pioneer in radio broadcasting, radar astronomy and photometry
- Jack DeWitt (writer) (1900–1981), American screenwriter
