= Echoes of Apollo =

International space organization

Echoes of Apollo is an international organisation formed in January 2009 by Pat Barthelow (USA) and Robert Brand (Australia). Brand has worked on international space projects including Apollo 11 communications and Barthelow has limited experience with bouncing amateur radio transmissions off the Moon - EME (communications). Echoes of Apollo operates a space oriented science education and outreach program that has a strong focus on space history. It works with groups around the world to promote space and space flight. Its defining message is: Celebrating the past, Living the present; Promoting the future of space exploration

The organization is the creator of World Moon Bounce Day'. A global event where both commercial and amateur radio operators bounce signals off the surface of the Moon and back to Earth. World Moon Bounce Day was first celebrated on June 27, 2009 (GMT) with some events starting some hours earlier. Countries around the world participate as the Earth turns and during a 24-hour event the Moon is visible to all countries. In amateur circles, the activities are also known as EME (communications) (Earth-Moon-Earth). The first World Moon Bounce Day had Apollo astronaut Bill Anders as a guest. His interview was bounced off the Moon as part of the activities. The University of Tasmania in Australia with their 26m dish was able to bounce a data signal off the surface of the Moon which was received by a large dish in the Netherlands. The data signal was successfully resolved back to data setting a world record for the lowest power data signal returned from the Moon with a transmit power of 3 mW - about 1,000th of the power of a strong flashlight filament globe.

Listen to greetings from children recorded in the Netherlands for the first World Moon Bounce Day and bounced off the Moon's surface:

The next World Moon Bounce Day was scheduled for the month preceding Apollo 13's 40th anniversary in March or April 2010.

Echoes of Apollo also provides a news clipping service for space news. Its main focus is on space missions, but also contains interesting astronomy news, especially when associated with radio telescopes. It is updated regularly during the week and can be viewed at: . The website provides significant information about the Apollo program and the communications network that supported the program. (http://www.wia.org.au/members/armag/2009/august/)
