= Walter McAfee =

American astronomer

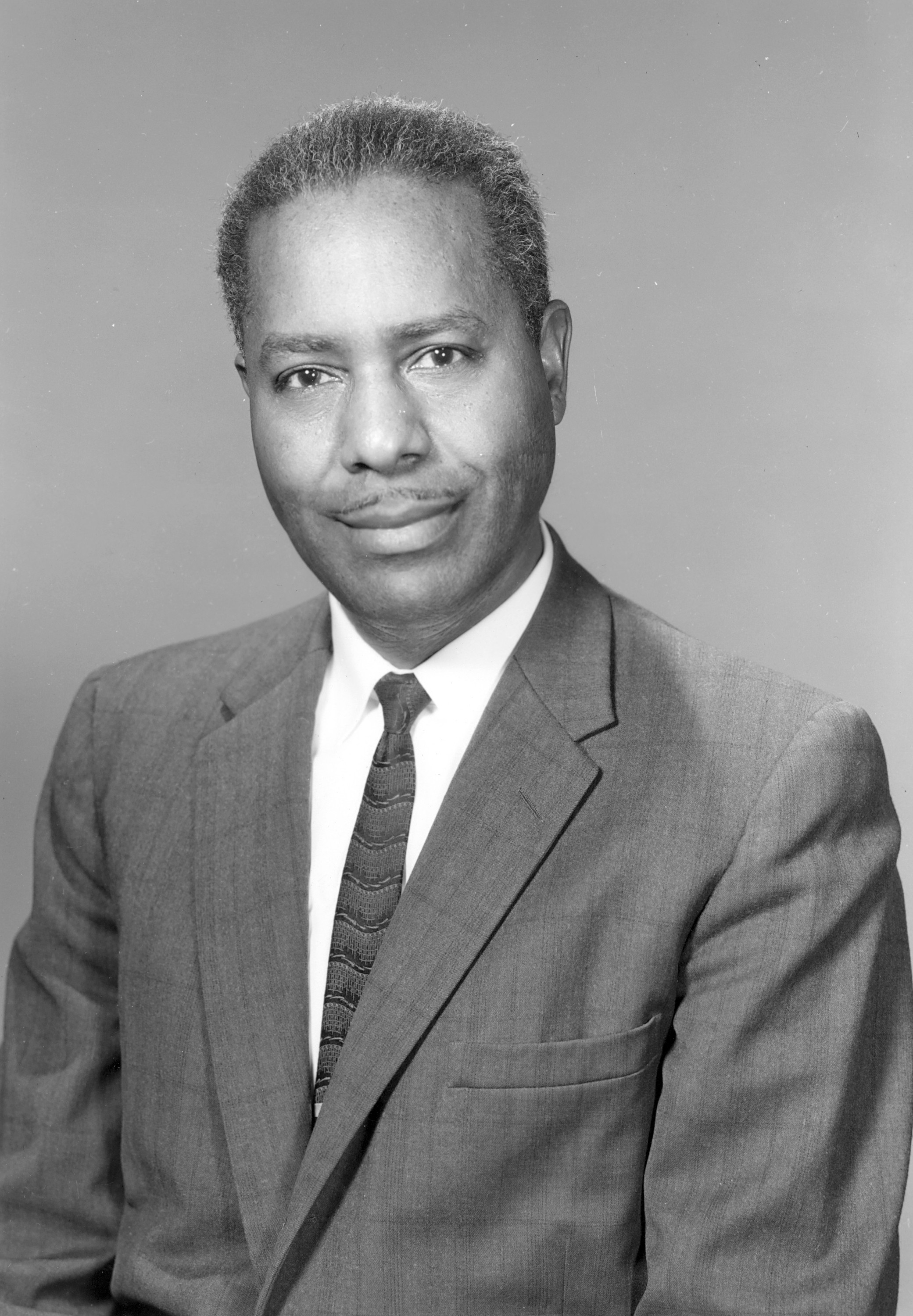
- Walter S. McAfee during his time serving as a scientist for the U.S. Army Communication-Electronics Command.
- Born: September 2, 1914; Ore City, Texas, US
- Died: February 18, 1995 (aged 80); South Belmar, New Jersey, US
- Education: Wiley College; Ohio State University; Cornell University
- Known for: Project Diana
- Scientific career
- Fields: Astronomy
- Workplaces: Fort Monmouth, New Jersey; Monmouth University
- Doctoral advisor: Hans Bethe

Walter Samuel McAfee (September 2, 1914 – February 18, 1995) was an American scientist and astronomer, notable for participating in the world's first lunar radar echo experiments with Project Diana.

== Personal life ==
McAfee was born in Ore City, Texas to African-American parents Luther F. McAfee and Susie A. Johnson; he was the second of their nine children. When McAfee was three months old, the family moved to Marshall, Texas, where McAfee would grow up and attend undergraduate school. He graduated high school in Marshall in 1930, and later noted that his high school physics and chemistry teacher, Freeman Prince Hodge, was a great influence of his. Following the completion of his master's degree, McAfee took a job in 1939 teaching science and mathematics in Columbus, Ohio. In 1941, he married Viola Winston, who taught French at the same junior high school in Columbus, Ohio where McAfee taught. McAfee and Winston had two daughters. McAfee died at his home in South Belmar, New Jersey, on February 18, 1995.

== Education ==
McAfee attended Wiley College, where his mother studied, graduating with a B.S. in mathematics in 1934. Following his undergraduate work, McAfee attended Ohio State University and earned his M.S. in physics in 1937. After his work on Project Diana with the United States Army Signal Corps Engineering Laboratories, McAfee returned to school, receiving the Rosenwald Fellowship to continue his doctoral studies at Cornell University. In 1949, McAfee was awarded his PhD in Physics for his work on nuclear collisions under Hans Bethe.

In 1956 President Dwight D. Eisenhower presented him with one of the first Secretary of the Army Research and Study Fellowships. The fellowship enabled McAfee to spend two years studying radio astronomy at Harvard University.

== Career ==
McAfee left his teaching position in Columbus when he was hired by the Army Signal Corps to work at the Electronics Research Command at Fort Monmouth, New Jersey, in May 1942. It was here that he participated in Project Diana, completing the first calculations showing that radar signals could be successfully bounced from a ground-based antenna to the Moon and back; this prediction was verified by an experiment conducted on January 10, 1946.

During his time at Fort Monmouth, he lectured in physics and electronics at Monmouth College (now Monmouth University) from 1958 to 1975, and served as a trustee at Brookdale Community College. McAfee also served on the Curriculum Advisory Council of the electronics engineering department at Monmouth and was recognized with an honorary doctorate of science in 1985.

== Honors and awards ==
In 1961, McAfee received the first U.S. Army Research and Development Achievement Award. He was eventually promoted to GS-16, making him the first African-American person to achieve this "super grade" civil service position. After his death, a building at Fort Monmouth was renamed the McAfee Center, marking the first time a civilian was so honored at the site. A research building at Aberdeen Proving Ground was named in his honor (2011), and he was inducted into the United States Army Materiel Command's Hall of Fame (2015), becoming the first African American to receive that honor. Wiley College inducted McAfee into its Science Hall of Fame.

== Selected publications ==
- Walter S. McAfee. Determination of energy spectra of backscattered electrons by use of Everhart's theory. Journal of Applied Physics 47, 1179 (1976); https://doi.org/10.1063/1.322700.
- Gerald J. Iafrate, Walter S. McAfee, and A. Ballato. Electron backscattering from solids and double layers. Journal of Vacuum Science and Technology 13, 843 (1976); https://doi.org/10.1116/1.569000.
