= Camp Evans Historic District =

Historic district in New Jersey, United States

- U.S. National Register of Historic Places
- U.S. National Historic Landmark District
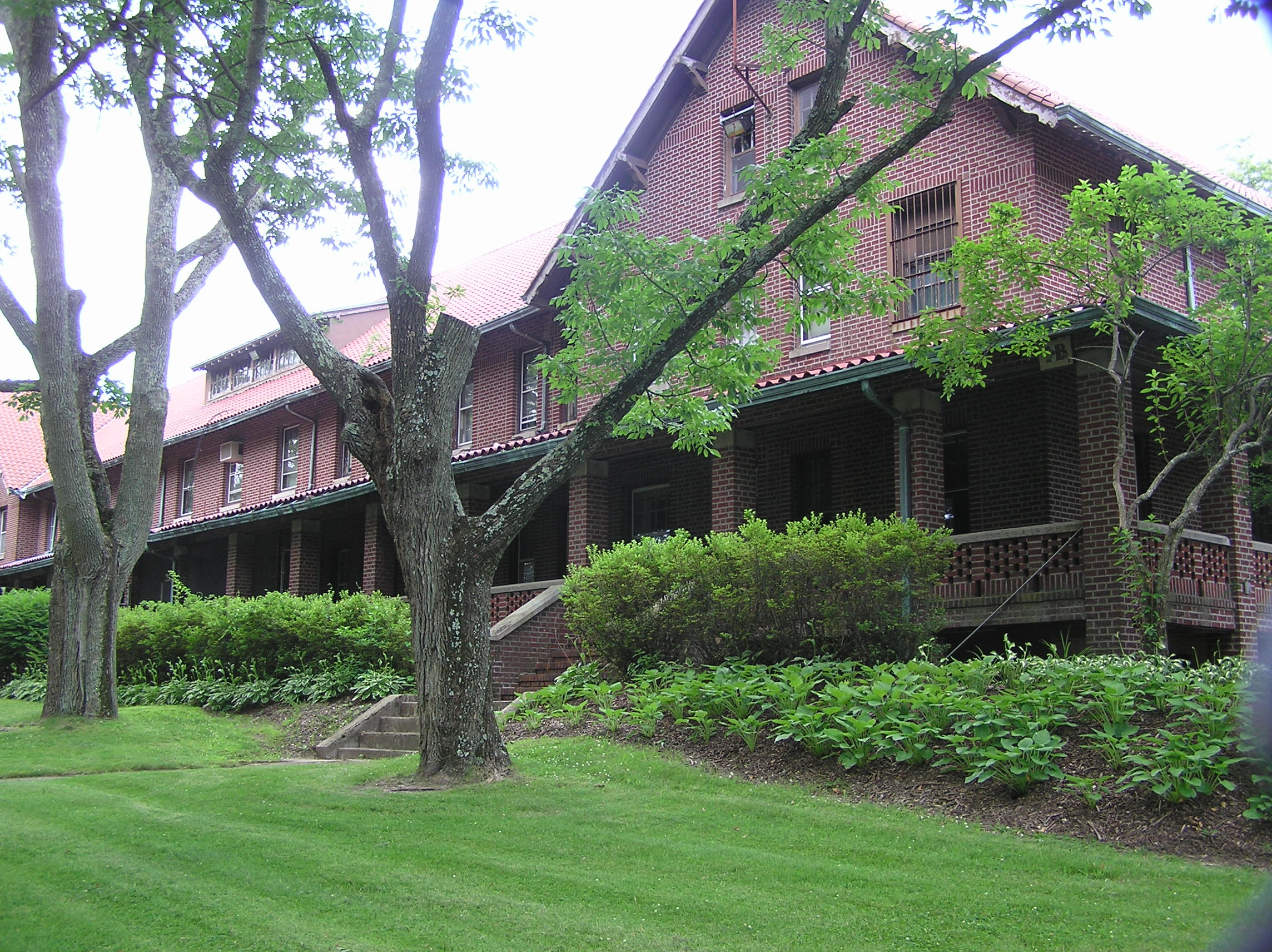
- The Marconi Hotel dedicated in 1914 at the Belmar Receiving Station is now InfoAge's "main campus"

- Location within New Jersey
- Nearest city: Belmar, New Jersey
- Coordinates: 40°11′20″N 74°3′53″W
- Area: 55 acres (22 ha)
- Built: 1912–1914
- NRHP reference No.: 02000274

Significant dates
- Added to NRHP: March 26, 2002
- Designated NHLD: October 16, 2012

The Camp Evans Historic District is a Formerly Used Defense Site, on the area of the former Camp Evans radar station in Wall Township, New Jersey. The site of the military installation is noted for its large transatlantic radio receiver built in 1941, and various former laboratories of the United States Army’s Signal Corps. The camp was designated as a National Historic Landmark District in 2012, in recognition of the site's long role in the development of modern civilian and military electronic communications.

== Belmar Wireless Receiving Station ==
The Belmar Wireless Receiving Station was established in 1912 near the Belmar community by the Marconi Wireless Telegraph Company of America (American Marconi); the site was built alongside a separate transatlantic transmitting facility in New Brunswick.

The Belmar station was part of Guglielmo Marconi's concept of a wireless “girdle” around the Earth. Original buildings on the campus were built by the J.G. White Engineering Corp. between 1912 and 1914. In one of the buildings being constructed for the Belmar station, the regenerative circuit was demonstrated on January 31 and February 1, 1914.

The Belmar station included a mile-long bronze-wire receiving antenna, strung on six 400-foot-tall masts and three 150-foot-tall balancing towers, overlooking the Shark River. Outgoing Morse-code messages were sent via a telegraph land-line from the Belmar Station to the transmitter. The receiving site also had a telegraph land-line to a New York office.

In April 1917, the Belmar station was acquired by the United States military, as part of the U.S. Navy's World War I Trans-Atlantic Communication System. After Armistice was signed to end the war on November 11, 1918, American Marconi regained control of the Belmar station. On November 20, 1919, General Electric acquired American Marconi and integrated into the Radio Corporation of America, which owned the Belmar station from 1919 until 1924.

== Changes of ownership ==
RCA sold the site in 1924 to the Monmouth County Pleasure Seekers Club, which was closely tied to Arthur H. Bell and the Ku Klux Klan. They owned the site from 1925 to 1935.

The Young People's Association for the Propagation of the Gospel purchased the Belmar station in 1936 and established The King's College, which opened in September 1938. When King’s College was denied accreditation, it relocated to Delaware City, Delaware in 1941.

The Signal Corps Radar Laboratory (SCRL) of Fort Hancock in Sandy Hook established a field set-up radar testing facility on-site in the late 1930s to compare U.S.-made radars with the British CH-CHL Radars; additional hardware testing was often done at the nearby Twin Lights radar station.

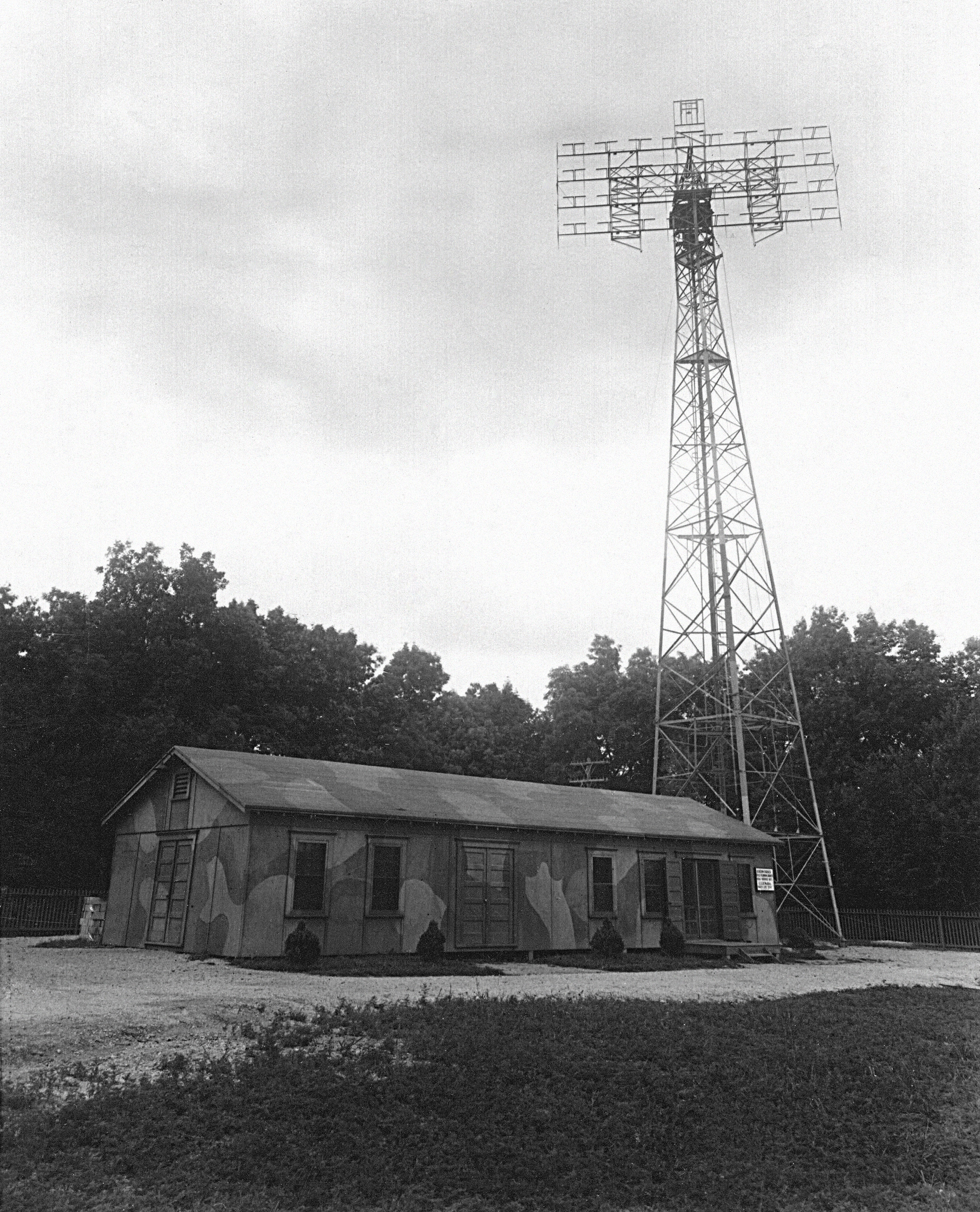
SCR-271 at Camp Evans

== Evans Signal Laboratory ==
In 1941, Wall Township purchased the Belmar station, including the original Marconi-era buildings and surrounding 93 acres, for the Army to relocate the SCRL. The site was renamed the Evans Signal Laboratory. Initial construction of Camp Evans Historic District quickly built more than two dozen buildings and structures on the open land to the south and west of the Marconi buildings, including 2 boiler houses, 4 long rectangular one-story buildings, and two groups of radio antenna shelters.

Two models of the SCR-271 radar were located near the intersection of Monmouth Boulevard and Watson Road.

== Camp Evans ==
Camp Evans was designated by War Department General Order, 17 February 1942; the Camp Evans Signal Laboratory was named on March 31, 1942 (the date of the camp's dedication); and in December 1942, the War Department directed the Signal Corps General Development Laboratories and the Camp Evans Signal Lab to combine into the Signal Corps Ground Service (SCGS) with headquarters at Bradley Beach, New Jersey (Hotel Grossman). The Camp Evans lab used VT-158 tube(s), developed by Harold A. Zahl, to adapt SCR-268s for picket ships, modified the SCR-268 into the SCR-602 which detected Japanese kamikazes (producing 12 renumbered AN/TPQ-3 developmental models) and on the SCR-584 tracking radar, did preliminary testing in December 1941 and added identification friend or foe. The lab also improved components (e.g. for the proximity fuse) and established a special unit which tested captured German and Japanese radars. The laboratory was also responsible for Army radar development by civilian companies (e.g., GE AN/CPS-1 early warning radar, Rad Lab AN/CPS-4 height finder, Bendix AN/GPN-2 & LE AN/GPN-6 search sets, and Bendix AN/CPN-18 secondary surveillance radar).

By August 1943, Lt Col Paul E. Watson was the director of the Camp Evans Signal Laboratory. In addition to the Signal lab, Camp Evans had the Joint Army-Navy Tube Standardization (JANS) Laboratory and in May 1945, the Signal Corps Ground Services was reformed into the Signal Corps Engineering Laboratories. Initial experimentation with an enemy mortar and artillery locating radar was conducted at Camp Evans in 1944. By the end of the war Camp Evans had approximately 134 buildings and structures on approximately 217 acres including the Meteorological Branch of the Army Signal Corps (cf. the Meteorological Branch at McCook Field).

=== Cold War events ===
The facility was the initial point of contact for many top German scientists after WWII. These included Wernher von Braun and Erich Traub as part of Operation Paperclip. Camp Evans' black engineers contributed to electronic research, development, product distribution and training. For instance, Dr. Walter McAfee at Fort Monmouth first calculated the speed of the moon during Project Diana (it took 40 minutes to travel 15 deg, the width of the fixed radar beam rotating with the Earth).

After the World War II Peenemünde V-2s tracked by the giant Würzburg radar had reached space and their telemetry had been received (e.g., at burnout); during moonrise on January 10, 1946, Project Diana transmitted VHF radar pulses through the ionosphere to the moon and detected the reflection using a modified version of an experimental SCR-271 at the right of center Camp Evans. By August 1951, the Evans Signal Laboratory had a Meteorological Branch in Bldg. 39.

The 1952 Army Radiation Dosimetry Laboratory was established in building 9401 which had an underground vault, a Van de Graaff machine, and AN/UDM-1A caesium-137 and AN/UDM-1 cobalt-60 calibration sources and a 130,000 Curie Cobalt-60 pool irradiator for radiac development. The building had one and a half foot walls to protect contain the radiation during experiments. After a visit on October 20, 1953. McCarthyism claimed that Camp Evans was a "house of spies", but none of the camp's employees which Senator McCarthy investigated in 1953 and 1954 were ever prosecuted. In 1957, replacement equipment, on the frame of a captured German Wertzburg [sic] Reise radar, erected at the Project Diana site helped track the Soviet Union's Sputnik (cf. the Deal Test Site in Ocean Township that moved to Evans in 1973).

Camp Evans became part of the Signal Radio Propagation Agency and developed a radar weather set The Evans laboratory transferred from the SCGS to the U. S. Army Signal Corps Engineering Laboratories (SCEL), which in April 1958 was renamed the U. S. Army Signal Corps Research and Development Laboratory. The Project Diana site with building 9162 was used for the NASA TIROS-1 satellite's downlink antenna (60-foot dish shaped antenna, Space Sentry) on April 1, 1960, for the first photograph from space (the ground terminal [was] at Fort Monmouth in the laboratory receiving area). Radiation Incorporated's AN/TLM-18 Space Sentry at Camp Evans was used for minitrack. The Army Photo-optics Laboratory opened at Camp Evans in 1963. Most Deal Test Site facilities and personnel moved to Camp Evans due to the Deal site lease terminating on June 30, 1973.

== Closure ==
The 1993 Base Realignment and Closure Commission at the end of the Cold War designated Camp Evans for closure (e.g., the Army Radiation Dosimetry Laboratory closed in 1999) Evans units moved to Fort Monmouth's Main Post (Project 42682), and Camp Evans land transferred to the National Park Service.

A section of the former camp is home to the Brookdale Campus at Wall, a branch of the Brookdale Community College.

A district of Camp Evans was listed on the National Register of Historic Places in 2002, and camp areas became part of the Save America's Treasures project (2005 funds were donated to restore the AN/TLM-18). In 2011, Institute for Exploratory Research began in the basement at the InfoAge Science Center.

== InfoAge ==
InfoAge Science & History Museums (InfoAge) was established in some of the historic district buildings . InfoAge is a member of the Association of Science-Technology Centers and was part of the NASA Digital Learning Network. Its focus is science and the scientific and military history of Camp Evans.

Exhibits and participating organizations include the Vintage Computing Federation, The Military Technology Museum of New Jersey, electronic warfare, a Cold War-era fallout shelter, vintage radio, the National Broadcasters Hall of Fame and Museum, The Computer Deconstruction Laboratory, the New Jersey Shipwreck Museum., and the Monmouth County Fire Museum.

The InfoAge Space Exploration Center (ISEC) provides adult and youth programs that range from lectures, activities, to week-long summer programs. ISEC exhibits include the operational AN/TLM-18 antenna system, satellite models, and Apollo guidance computer.
