= Communication Moon Relay =

1950s project by the United States Navy

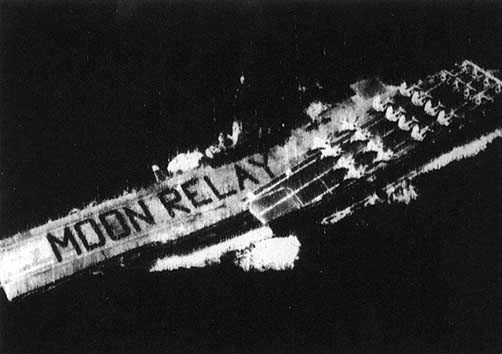
Sailors on board the USS Hancock (CV-19) spelling out "Moon Relay." This picture was transmitted via Moon bounce as part of the official Navy inauguration of the system.

The Communication Moon Relay project (also known as simply Moon Relay, or, alternatively, Operation Moon Bounce) was a telecommunication project carried out by the United States Navy. Its objective was to develop a secure and reliable method of Wireless communication by using the Moon as a natural communications satellite — a technique known as Earth–Moon–Earth communication (EME). Most of the project's work took place during the 1950s at the United States Naval Research Laboratory. Operation Moon Relay was spun off from a classified military espionage program known as Passive Moon Relay (PAMOR), which sought to eavesdrop on Soviet military radar signals reflected from the Moon.

== Background ==
Communication Moon Relay grew out of many ideas and concepts in radio espionage. Some impetus for the project was provided by post-World War II efforts to develop methods of tracking radio signals, particularly those originating in Eastern Europe and the Soviet Union. Other sources included earlier proposals to use the Moon as a radio wave reflector, which date back to 1928. The first proof of this concept was the Project Diana program of the U.S. Army Signal Corps in 1946, which detected radar waves bounced off the Moon. This attracted the attention of Donald Menzel. Menzell was a staff member of the Harvard College Observatory and a former United States Navy Reserve commander, who proposed that the Navy undertake a program to use the Moon as a secure communications satellite.

Prior to the Moon Relay project, long distance wireless communication around the curve of the Earth was conducted by skywave ("skip") transmission, in which radio waves are refracted by the Earth's ionosphere, which was sometimes disrupted by solar flares and geomagnetic storms. Before artificial satellites, the Moon provided the only reliable celestial object from which to reflect radio waves to communicate between points on opposite sides of the Earth.

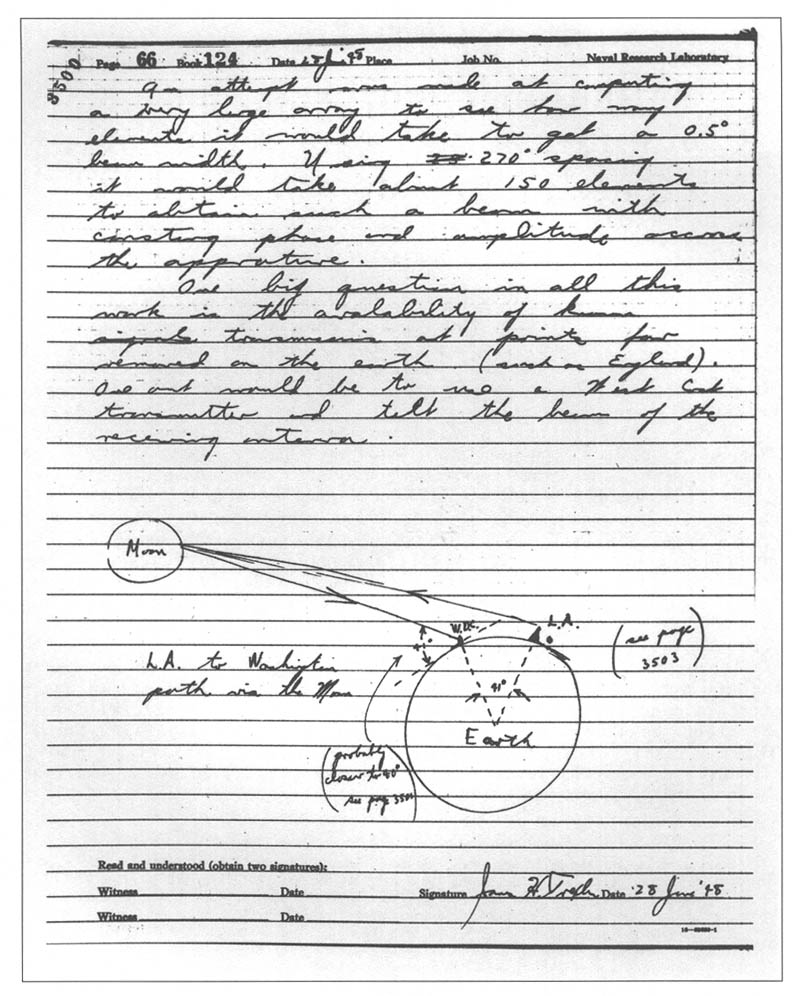
An entry in Trexler's notebook regarding Moon bounce communications

The developments in Moon circuit communications eventually came to the attention of James Trexler, a radio engineer at the Naval Research Laboratory. His interest was piqued by a paper published by researchers at an ITT laboratory. Trexler developed plans for a system designed to intercept Soviet radar signals by detecting the transmissions that bounced off the Moon. This program, codenamed "Joe," began making regular observations in August 1949. Within a year, "Joe" was made an official Navy intelligence program, the Passive Moon Relay (PAMOR).

In September 1950, a new parabolic antenna for the PAMOR project was completed at Stump Neck, Maryland. The first tests of this antenna were impressive; the returning signal was of much higher fidelity than expected. This presented the possibility of using a Moon circuit as a communications circuit. Unfortunately for PAMOR, collecting Soviet radar signals would require a larger antenna. Efforts began to have such an antenna constructed at Sugar Grove, West Virginia.

== Development ==
With the PAMOR project requiring a larger antenna, the Stump Neck antenna was pushed into service for testing whether communication via the Moon was possible. This marked the emergence of the Moon Relay as a separate project. Test transmissions between Stump Neck and Washington, D.C. were carried out; the first satellite transmission of voice occurred on July 24, 1954. These were followed by the first transcontinental test of the system on November 20, 1955; the receiving site was the U.S. Navy Electronics Laboratory in San Diego, California. After corrections to reduce signal loss, the transmissions were extended to Wahiawa, Hawaii.

The Navy received the new system favorably. A Navy contract for the project soon followed the successful tests, and, among other things, it was recommended that American submarines use Moon-reflection paths for communications to shore.

== Expansion ==
The Moon Relay project was soon transferred to the Communications Section of the Radar Division of the Naval Research Laboratory. Under this department, the system was upgraded to use the ultra high frequency (UHF) band. The experimental system was transformed into a fully operational lunar relay system linking Hawaii with Washington, DC, which became functional in 1959. The new system was officially inaugurated in January 1960, when Chief of Naval Operations Admiral Arleigh Burke sent a message to Commander, Pacific Fleet Felix Stump using the system.

The finished system used two sets of transmitters at Annapolis, Maryland and the Opana Radar Site in Hawaii and two sets of receivers at Cheltenham, Maryland and Wahiawa, Hawaii. It was later expanded to accommodate ship-to-shore transmissions to and from the USS Oxford (AGTR-1) and USS Liberty (AGTR-5).

== Results ==
The Moon Relay system became obsolete in the later 1960s as the Navy implemented its artificial satellite communication system. However, the information gleaned from the project in fact made the later artificial system possible. Additionally, the equipment used in the Communications Moon Relay project was of much use to U.S. Navy astronomers, as they used it to examine the Moon when the Moon was not in a position conducive to radio transmission. Although relatively short-lived, the Moon Relay served as a bridge to modern American military satellite systems.
