= Project Diana =

1946 US Army Signal Corps experiment to reflect radar signals off of the Moon

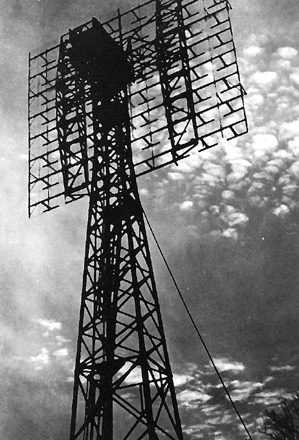
Project Diana radar antenna, Fort Monmouth, New Jersey

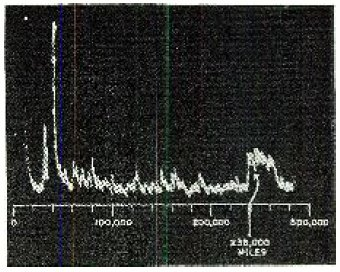
Oscilloscope display showing the radar signal. The large pulse on the left is the transmitted signal, the small pulse on the right is the return signal from the Moon. The horizontal axis is time, but is calibrated in miles. It can be seen that the measured range is 238,000 mi (383,000 km), approximately the distance from the Earth to the Moon.

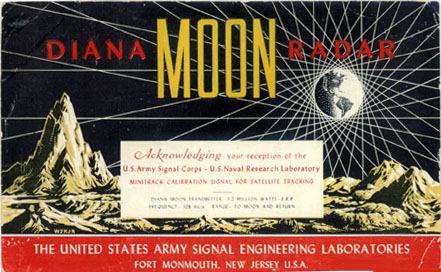
QSL card for reception reports

Project Diana, named for the Roman moon goddess Diana, was an experimental project of the US Army Signal Corps in 1946 to bounce radar signals off the Moon and receive the reflected signals. This was the first experiment in radar astronomy and the first active attempt to probe another celestial body. It was the inspiration for later Earth–Moon–Earth communication (EME) techniques.

== History ==
Following the end of World War II, Col. John H. DeWitt Jr., Director of the Evans Signal Laboratory at Camp Evans (part of Fort Monmouth), in Wall Township, New Jersey, was directed by the Pentagon to determine whether the ionosphere could be penetrated by radar, in order to detect and track enemy ballistic missiles that might enter the ionosphere. He decided to address this charge by attempting to bounce radar waves off the Moon. For this task he assembled a team of engineers that included Chief Scientist E. King Stodola, Herbert Kauffman, Jacob Mofenson, and Harold Webb. Input from other Camp Evans units was sought on various issues, including most notably the mathematician Walter McAfee, who made the required mathematical calculations.

On the Laboratory site, a large transmitter, receiver and antenna array were constructed for this purpose. The transmitter, a highly modified SCR-271 radar set from World War II, provided 3 kilowatts (later upgraded to 50 kilowatts) at 111.5 MHz in 1/4-second pulses, applied to the antenna, a "bedspring" reflective array antenna composed of an 8x8 array of half wave dipoles and reflectors that provided 24 dB of gain. Return signals were received about 2.5 seconds later, the time required for the radio waves to make the 768,000-kilometre (477,000 mi) round-trip journey from the Earth to the Moon and back. The receiver had to compensate for the Doppler shift in frequency of the reflected signal due to the Moon's orbital motion relative to the Earth's surface, which was different each day, so this motion had to be carefully calculated for each trial. The antenna could be rotated in azimuth only, so the attempt could be made only as the Moon passed through the 15 degree wide beam at moonrise and moonset, as the antenna's elevation angle was horizontal. About 40 minutes of observation was available on each pass as the Moon transited the various lobes of the antenna pattern.

The first successful echo detection came on 10 January 1946 at 11:58am local time by Harold Webb and Herbert Kauffman.

Project Diana marked the birth of radar astronomy later used to map Venus and other nearby planets, and was a necessary precursor to the US space program. It was the first demonstration that terrestrial radio signals could penetrate the ionosphere, opening the possibility of radio communications beyond the Earth for space probes and human explorers. It also established the practice of naming space projects after Roman gods, e.g., Mercury and Apollo.

Project Diana demonstrated the feasibility of using the Moon as a passive reflector to transmit radio signals from one point on the Earth to the other, around the curve of the Earth. This Earth-Moon-Earth (EME) or "moonbounce" path has been used in a few communication systems. One of the first was the secret US military espionage PAMOR (Passive Moon Relay) program in 1950, which sought to eavesdrop on Soviet Russian military radio communication by picking up stray signals reflected from the Moon. The return signals were extremely faint, and the US began secret construction of the largest parabolic antenna in the world at Sugar Grove, West Virginia, until the project was abandoned in 1962 as too expensive. A more successful spinoff was the US Navy Communication Moon Relay or Operation Moonbounce communication system, which used the EME path for US military communication. In January, 1960 the system was inaugurated with a lunar relay link between Hawaii and Washington DC. Moonbounce communication was abandoned by the military with the advent of communications satellites in the early 1960s. Since then it has been used by amateur radio operators.

Today, the Project Diana site is part of the Camp Evans Historic District, InfoAge Science History Learning Center and Museum, and is maintained by the Infoage Space Exploration Center, and previously by the Ocean-Monmouth Amateur Radio Club. The antenna array was removed earlier and is now presumably lost.
