= Deal Test Site =

Park and former test site in New Jersey

Coordinates: 40.25714°N 74.03148°W

The Deal Test Site (now Joe Palaia Park) is located in Ocean Township, New Jersey.

The Joe Palaia Park was originally started as the Foxburst Farm, a 63-acre (250,000 m^{2}) tract which is now the southern portion of the park. It was purchased by Western Electric, (part of AT&T and later Lucent), in 1919. The site was later expanded with an additional 145 acres (0.59 km^{2}) purchased by AT&T in 1927. The site is bounded by three major township roads, Deal Road, Whalepond Road, and Dow Avenue. Several homes on Whalepond Road, north of Freehold Street, and Dow Avenue, from the corner of Whalepond Road to the Ocean Township School, abut the property.

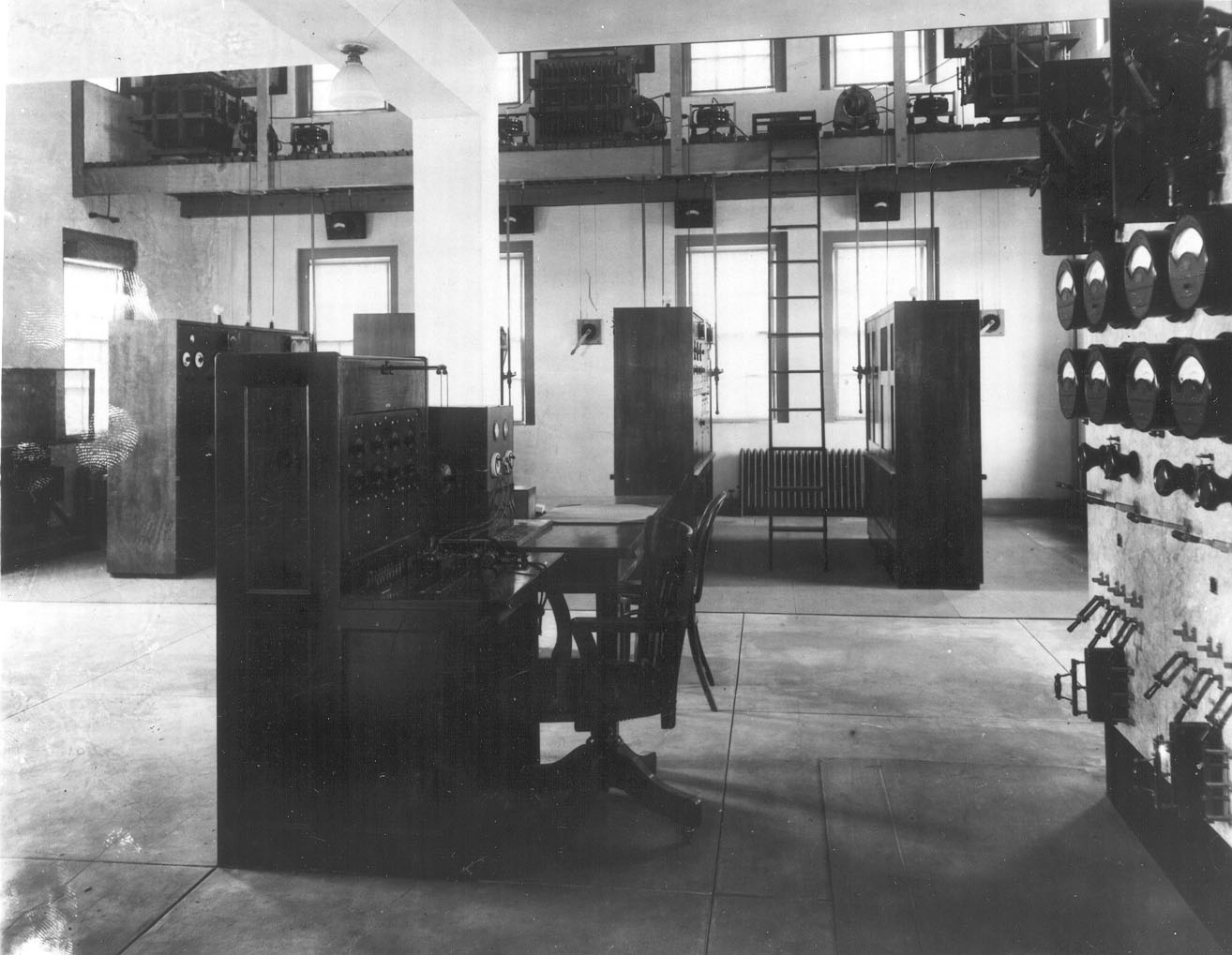
Transmitter room circa 1922

After World War I, AT&T used the site to conduct ship-to-shore wireless experiments off the Jersey Shore. Five large radio towers were eventually erected and used to broadcast speech and music for a range of 1,000 miles (1,600 km). In 1921, a two-story white building was built, which was used as a laboratory and dormitories for engineers.

Research continued through the 1930s in conjunction with Bell Telephone Laboratories (the successor to Western Electric's research division), to use shorter wavelengths for radio transmission, this eventually led to the development of the microwave radio relay systems used to carry long-distance telephone traffic in the latter half of the 20th century. The development of fiber-optic communications (also by Bell Labs) ended the widespread use of microwave repeaters.

Facilities at the test site were used in the 1950s and 1960s to monitor missiles and satellites launched from Cape Kennedy. It was instrumental in the development of TIROS-1 and TIROS-2 weather satellites.

In 1953, the test site was sold by AT&T, and the new owners leased the property to the U.S. Army Signal Corps for tracking satellites. A 28-foot (8.5 m) dish antenna on a 40-foot (12 m) tower (near the Bicentennial Oak Tree) was used to pick up signals from Russian satellites Sputnik 1 and Sputnik 2. The large circular concrete base of this antenna is still visible today.

In the 1960s, the Army transmitted the first photograph via facsimile (fax) to Puerto Rico from the site using the Courier satellite.

In 1823/1824, long before the land became a test site, a Late Pleistocene/early Holocene mastodon was excavated from a peat bog on the south side of Poplar Brook. Fossil vertebrate remains were also found from the Tertiary marls along the brook.

== Present day ==
In the 1970s, It was used for Summer Stock Plays on the outdoor stage to the south of the main road.

In the 1990s, the Deal test site was renamed Palaia Park, and a 3-mile (4.8 km) system of paved pathways have been laid throughout the site. The park contains soccer and baseball fields, and boasts a large festival ground that is used by the township for civic events, and cultural festivals.

The park has also hosted the USA Track & Field (USATF), USA 40 km Racewalking championships that occur in early September.

Many festivals and events take place throughout the year at the test site, including the Italian American Festival, which attracts over 100,000 visitors over five days.

== See also ==
- Deal, New Jersey

== Sources ==
- Atlanticville (local newspaper) May 2, 2003
