= John H. DeWitt Jr. =

American radio astronomer

- Born: February 20, 1906; Nashville, Tennessee, U.S.
- Died: January 25, 1999 (aged 92)
- Education: Vanderbilt University
- Spouses: Ann Elise Martin; Sykes Barbour Hewitt Neas
- Children: 1 son (John Hibbett DeWitt III), 1 daughter (Cary Claiborne DeWitt)
- Parent: John Hibbett DeWitt

John H. DeWitt Jr. (February 20, 1906 – January 25, 1999) was an American pioneer in radio broadcasting, radar astronomy and photometry. He observed the first successful reception of radio echoes off the Moon on January 10, 1946, as part of Project Diana.

== Early life ==
John Hibbett DeWitt Jr. was born February 20, 1906, in Nashville, Tennessee, the son of judge John Hibbett DeWitt. He displayed an early interest in electrical engineering, specifically radio technology. He became an amateur radio operator in 1921 and used call sign N4CBC. In 1924, he helped direct the design and installation of a 100-watt radio transmitter at First Baptist Church in Nashville, which would become the area's first commercial radio station.

DeWitt earned a bachelor's degree in engineering degree at Vanderbilt University in 1928.

== Career ==
DeWitt began work at Bell Laboratories in Washington, D.C. the next year. He returned to Nashville in 1932 to become chief engineer for WSM.

After the outbreak of the Second World War, he returned to Washington as a lieutenant colonel in the United States Army to work at the United States Army Signal Corps' Evans Signal Laboratories on radar. He was appointed director of the Evans Laboratories in late 1943, where he headed Project Diana.

He retired from the Army in 1946 and worked for a year as a consultant to a Clear-channel station group, which was seeking approval for greater transmitter power. He became president of WSM in 1947, retiring in 1968.

== Personal life and death ==
DeWitt was married twice and had two children. With first wife Ann Elise Martin DeWitt, he had a son, John Hibbett DeWitt III; with second wife Sykes Barbour Hewitt Neas, he had a daughter, Cary Claiborne DeWitt.

DeWitt died January 25, 1999, 53 years to the day after making radio history.

== Awards ==
- Institute of Radio Engineers Fellow
- 1946: Legion of Merit
- 1964: Radio Engineering Achievement Award, National Association of Broadcasters
- 1974: Vanderbilt Academy of Distinguished Alumni
- 1995 Broadcasting & Cable Hall of Fame inductee
