= Fort Monmouth =

Former Army installation in New Jersey, US

Coordinates: 40.314°N 74.045°W

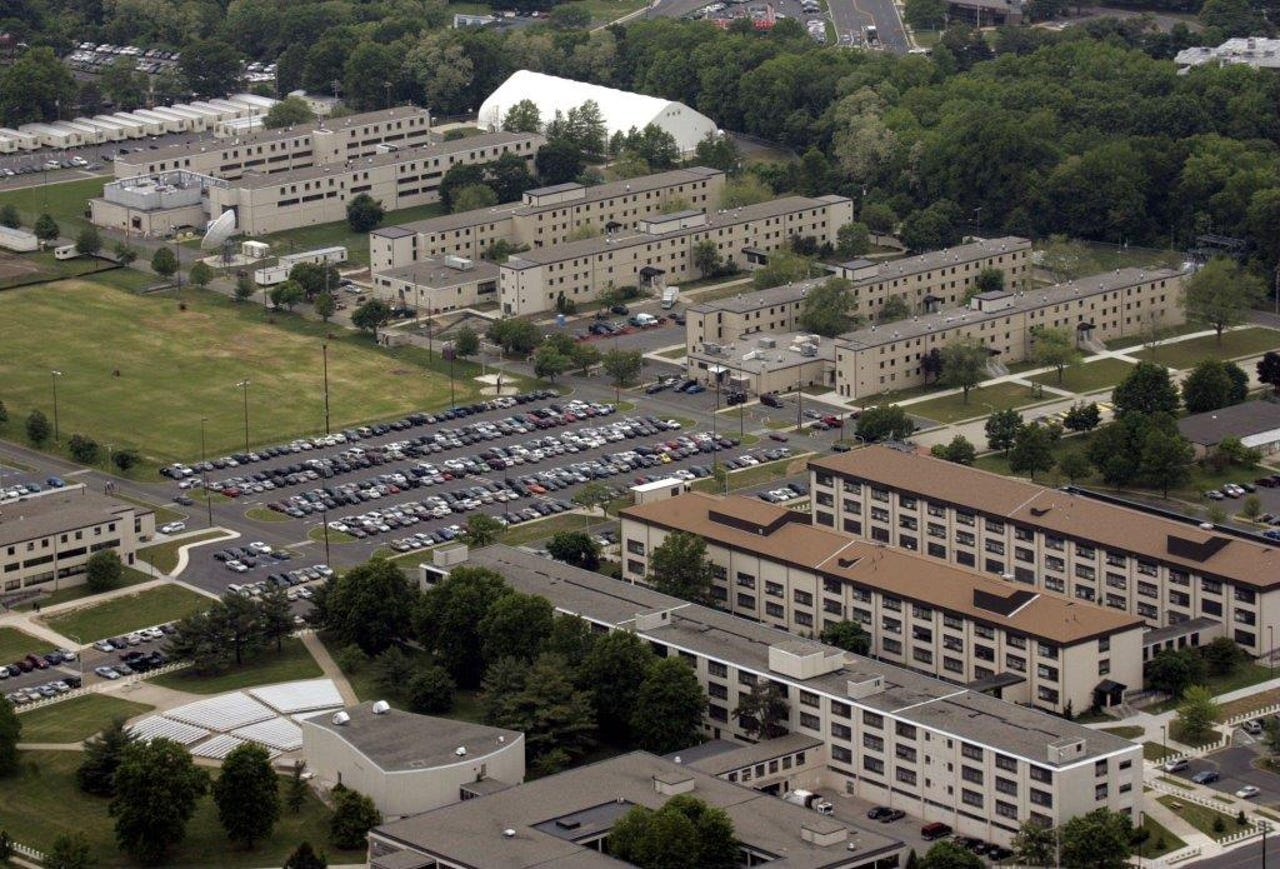
Aerial view of Fort Monmouth in 2008, prior to its closure

Fort Monmouth is a former United States Army installation in Monmouth County, New Jersey, United States, spread across the boroughs of Eatontown, Tinton Falls and Oceanport. The facility is the site of the planned Netflix Studios Fort Monmouth production campus, alongside a variety of other redevelopment projects. It is about five miles (8.0 km) from the Atlantic Ocean and about a 52 mi (84 km) drive south of Manhattan.

== Location ==
The fort is about a ten-minute drive from Seven Presidents Oceanfront Park and Long Branch Beach on the Jersey Shore. The post covered nearly 1,126 acres (4.56 km^{2}) of land, from the Shrewsbury River on the east, to Route 35 on the west; this area was referred to as 'Main Post.' A separate area, Camp Charles Wood, was to the west of Main Post and included housing, a golf course, and additional office and laboratory facilities.

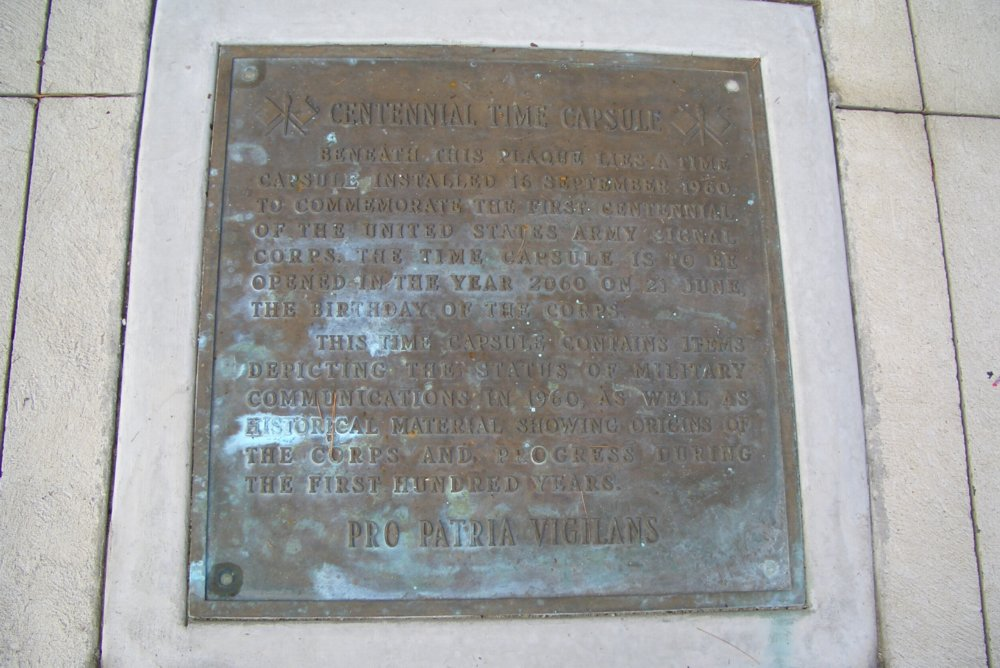
Signal Corps Time Capsule

== Netflix Studios Fort Monmouth ==
The Fort Monmouth gate arches on Route 35 in Eatontown, with a sign for the planned Netflix development, September 2025

In October 2022, Netflix signed to build a major "state-of-the-art" production complex, Netflix Studios Fort Monmouth, on a nearly 300-acre portion of the former army installation, known as Mega Parcel. The state has seen an influx of film production and soundstage construction in light of New Jersey's newly expanded film production tax credit program. As of March 2024, Netflix had moved into site plan development.

The Netflix contract was facilitated by the Fort Monmouth Economic Revitalization Authority, the board that oversees redevelopment of the fort. The property was purchased for $55 million, with a projected investment of $850 million into construction. It is estimated to generate an estimated 1500 permanent jobs for the area.

On December 21, 2022, Governor Murphy described Netflix's purchase of the Mega Parcel as a "transformative investment” for New Jersey. Eatontown's mayor Anthony Talerico commented on the potential economic growth the project will bring to the surrounding area. Oceanport's mayor Jay Coffey praised the project and cited "social revitalization" that Netflix would bring to Fort Monmouth. Public opinion from Oceanport and Eatontown residents was largely positive. It is projected that this production campus will accrue an estimated maximum of $4.6 billion in revenue over the next 20 years.

The proposed redevelopment project will be located adjacent to major public transportation outlets such as NJ Transit lines, the Garden State Parkway, and Route 35. Estimations for the size of the planned campus are between 180,000 and 480,000 square feet. The development will contain 12 sound stages, various production buildings, and office buildings. Governor Phil Murphy wrote Netflix a letter to petition them to purchase land in New Jersey over the original property in Georgia due to Georgia's controversial changes in voter laws.

On February 21, 2024, the Fort Monmouth Economic Revitalization Authority unanimously approved an amendment to create zoning for the project, allowing Netflix to move ahead with its plans for the complex.

=== Other developers on location ===
As of the end of 2023, a microbrewery called Birdsmouth Beer, a speciality foods business, and a entertainment venue offering fine dining, live music, virtual golf and a sports bar called Baseline Social had all opened at the fort’s former commissary store building. Fort Monmouth will also be the site of redevelopment by RWJ Barnabas Health in New Jersey. In December 2022, a deal was finalized for the purchase of the former Myer Center for $8 million. RWJ Barnabas Health plans to replace the building with an extension of their medical campus. The new construction plans entail an ambulatory care pavilion as well as a cancer center.

Other retail, housing, dining, and a hotel are planned as well.

The site is also home to Nicol NJ, a 20,000-square-foot racket-sports facility for padel, squash, and pickleball, owned and operated by Jessica Winstanely and her husband Peter Nicol, the former World number-one-ranked squash player.

== History ==
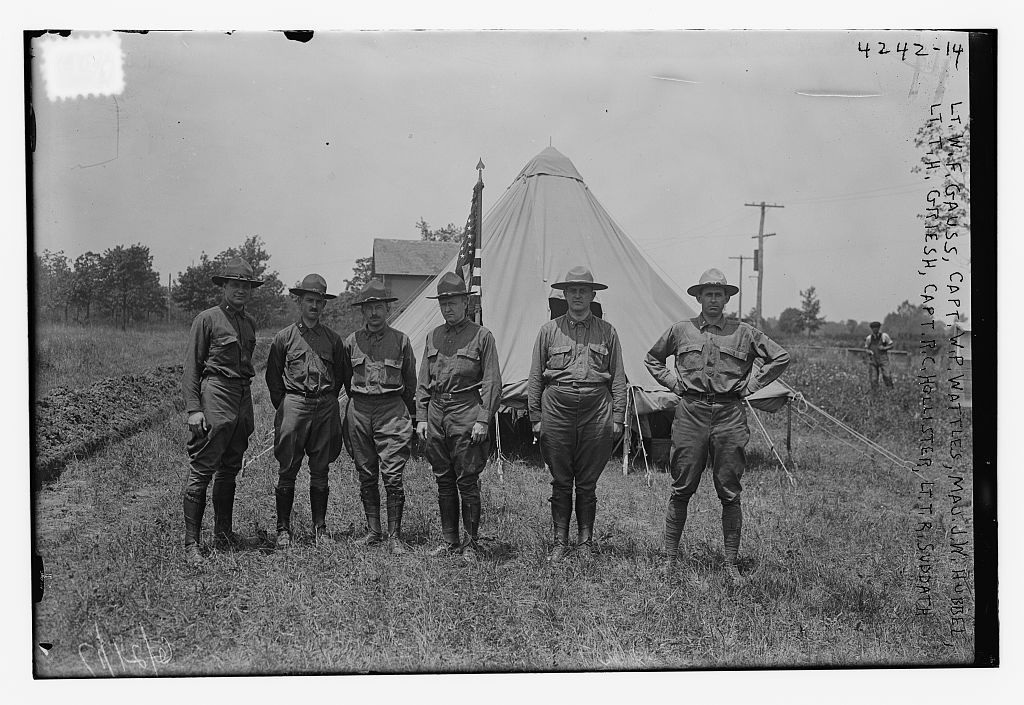
Fort Monmouth in 1917

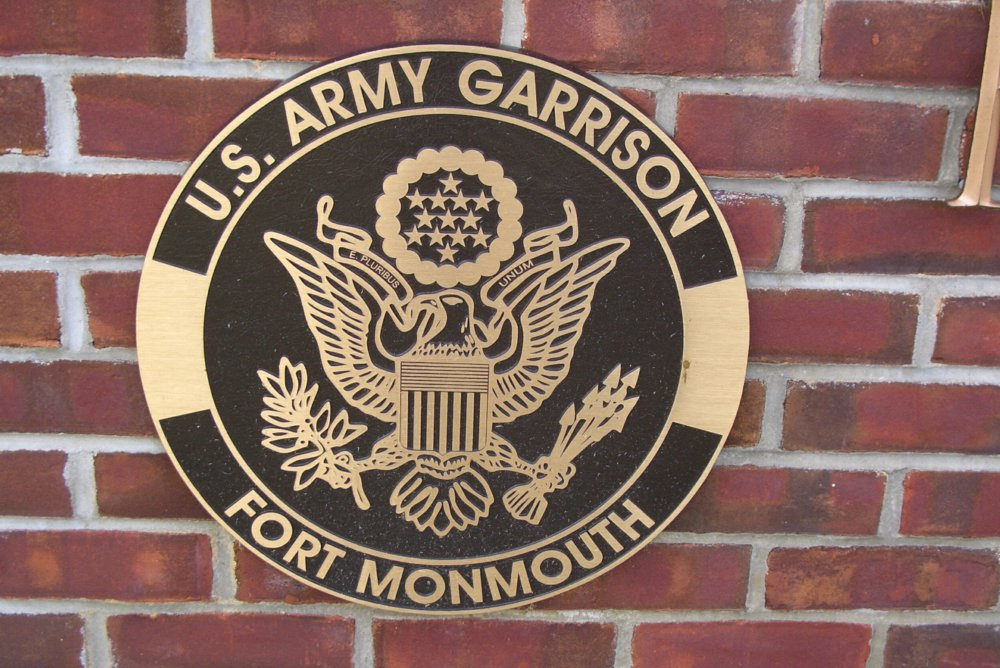
Ft. Monmouth Garrison Shield

For more information, see the official U.S. Army CECOM Life Cycle Management Command (LCMC) / Fort Monmouth Historical Office website or Fort Monmouth Timeline (Microsoft Word document)

=== Monmouth Park Race Track ===
The property where the majority of the former base was built upon was the original site of the Monmouth Park Race Track, a large horse racing track in Eatontown, designed by David D. Withers which opened in 1870 and was later heavily expanded, opening a larger race track on July 4, 1890. The track featured a one-and-one-half mile oval track centered on what would later become Greely Field, a 700 by 210 foot steel grandstand that could accommodate 10,000 spectators (reportedly the largest in the world at the time), eleven railroad sidings which connected to various rail lines, and a luxury hotel fronting Parkers Creek. The complex encompassed 640 acres, was touted as the largest racetrack complex in the world, and attracted several celebrated Gilded Age figures to its races.

The race track was closed by 1894 after the New Jersey Legislature banned parimutuel gambling and fell into disrepair, with weather and a fire destroying much of the race track’s facilities by 1915. The Monmouth Park Racecourse would later reopen at its current site of Oceanport in 1946.

=== Site selection, Camp Little Silver, and Camp Alfred Vail ===
During World War I, Colonel Carl F. Hartmann of the Signal Corps’ Eastern Department tasked then-Major General Charles H. Corlett to scout and determine adequate locations for the establishment of a new officer training camp. Maj. Gen. Corlett would eventually find the abandoned race track in Eatontown, which had been partially converted into a potato farm, and determined that the site’s rail sidings connecting to the Port of Hoboken, proximity to the Port of Little Silver, and large size was ideal.

With the approval of then-Adjutant General Henry Pinckney McCain, a leasing contract was signed on May 16, 1917 by Maj. Gen. Corlett and Melvin Van Keuren, the owner of the property, in which the Army would lease 468 of the 640 acres and retain the option to buy out those acres. The Army also agreed to compensate tenant farmer Charles Prothero for the loss of 70 acres worth of potato crop in the lease.

Construction began on June 3, with the arrival of the first 32 Signal Corps soldiers. The camp was designed as a training center for the 1st and 2nd Reserve Signal Battalions, and became temporarily known as Camp Little Silver due to its location within the Little Silver section of the property. By the end of June 1917, over 450 soldiers were stationed at the camp.

The camp was renamed Camp Alfred Vail on September 15, 1917, after engineer and telegram developer Alfred Vail. The Chief Signal Officer authorized the outright purchase of Camp Vail that same month, and the Signal Corps School relocated from Fort Leavenworth to Camp Vail that year.

In 1918, the Signal Corps’ Radio Laboratory was relocated from Washington, D.C. to Camp Vail. Throughout 1918 and 1919, a Pigeon Breeding and Training section was formed at the camp. The 122nd Aero Squadron of the Signal Corps would be transferred to the Army Air Service in November of 1918, and move from Camp Vail to Hazelhurst Field. The Signal Corps Board relocated to Camp Vail in 1924.

=== Fort Monmouth ===
In August of 1925, Camp Vail was granted permanent status and was renamed Fort Monmouth, in honor of the soldiers of the American Revolutionary War who died in the nearby Battle of Monmouth in 1778. The first permanent building was built in 1928. Other structures were built to house units that the Army consolidated at Fort Monmouth.

In 1928, the first radio-equipped meteorological balloon reached the upper atmosphere, a forerunner of weather sounding techniques universally used today. In 1938 the U.S. Army's first radio-based aircraft detection and ranging system (later called radar) was developed on post. A production model of this equipment detected the oncoming Japanese air attack on Pearl Harbor, but the warning it provided was discounted. In 1946, celestial communication was proved feasible, when the radar developed by the Project Diana team was used to bounce radio signals off the moon.

Additional property was purchased in 1941 for Camp Coles near Red Bank, Camp Charles Wood in Tinton Falls, and Camp Evans in Wall Township. At its peak during World War II, Fort Monmouth measured 1,713 acres (6.93 km^{2}), and had billeting space for 1,559 officers and 19,786 enlisted personnel. The Eastern Signal Corps Training Center consisted of the Eastern Signal Corps Schools (enlisted, officer candidate, and officers) and the Replacement Training Center at Camp Charles Wood. The Signal Corps Officer Candidate School (OCS), the major activity on the main post, graduated 21,033 new Signal Corps second lieutenants between 1941 and 1946.

More communications units, including the Pigeon Breeding and Training Center, were consolidated into Fort Monmouth after the war ended. The pigeon service was discontinued in 1957; the birds were either sold at auction or donated to zoos.

Special effects artist Harry Redmond, Jr. designed and constructed a new film studio for the Army Film Training Lab at Fort Monmouth during World War II. Fort Monmouth was also home to the combat motion picture school, including laboratories and a production studio. Students were from the army, air force and marine corps. During the Vietnam era, Vietnamese army students were also trained.

=== Rosenbergs ===
Julius Rosenberg had worked as a radar inspector at Fort Monmouth in 1942 and 1943. It is from the fort that he was accused and convicted of stealing proximity fuze plans and passing them on to the Soviet Union. Documents released by Russia after the Cold War showed that Julius Rosenberg was indeed a spy. Joseph McCarthy claimed in October 1953 that Julius Rosenberg had set up a wartime spy ring at Fort Monmouth, and that the ring might still be in operation. Two Fort Monmouth scientists, Joel Barr and Alfred Sarant, fled to the Soviet Union.

The hysteria surrounding Fort Monmouth and the Rosenbergs was not limited to Julius and Ethel; others with the last name Rosenberg (or Kaplan) lost their security clearance for no reason other than sharing a name with communists.

=== Post-WWII ===
The base became the headquarters of home to several units of the U.S. Army Materiel Command, offices of the Army Acquisition Executive that research and manage Command and Control, Communications, Computing, Intelligence, Surveillance and Reconnaissance capabilities and related technology, as well as an interservice organization designed to coordinate C4ISR, an academic preparatory school, an explosive ordnance disposal unit, a garrison services unit, an Army health clinic, and a Veterans Administration health clinic. Other agencies, including the Federal Bureau of Investigation, Federal Emergency Management Agency and the National Security Agency.

A rail line, owned by Conrail, ran through Camp Charles Wood and out to Naval Weapons Station Earle. The post was like a small town, including a Post Exchange, health clinic, gas station and other amenities. From the September 11 attacks in 2001 to 2017, the post was not open to the public to drive through and was closed to all but authorized personnel. The main road through the fort was reopened to the public in 2017.

During the late 20th century Fort Monmouth was home to the US Army Chaplain Center and School (USACHCS). Enlisted soldiers, non-commissioned officers (NCOs) and officers training to become Chaplain Assistants and Chaplains were trained at Fort Monmouth.

From 1952 the post's aviation section, which flight-tested airborne communications and ground-controlled approach equipment for the Signal Corps, was based at Monmouth County Airport (now Monmouth Executive Airport) in Wall Township. In December 1963 the section moved, with 52 aircraft, to the Lakehurst Naval Air Station.

=== Final years as an Army post ===
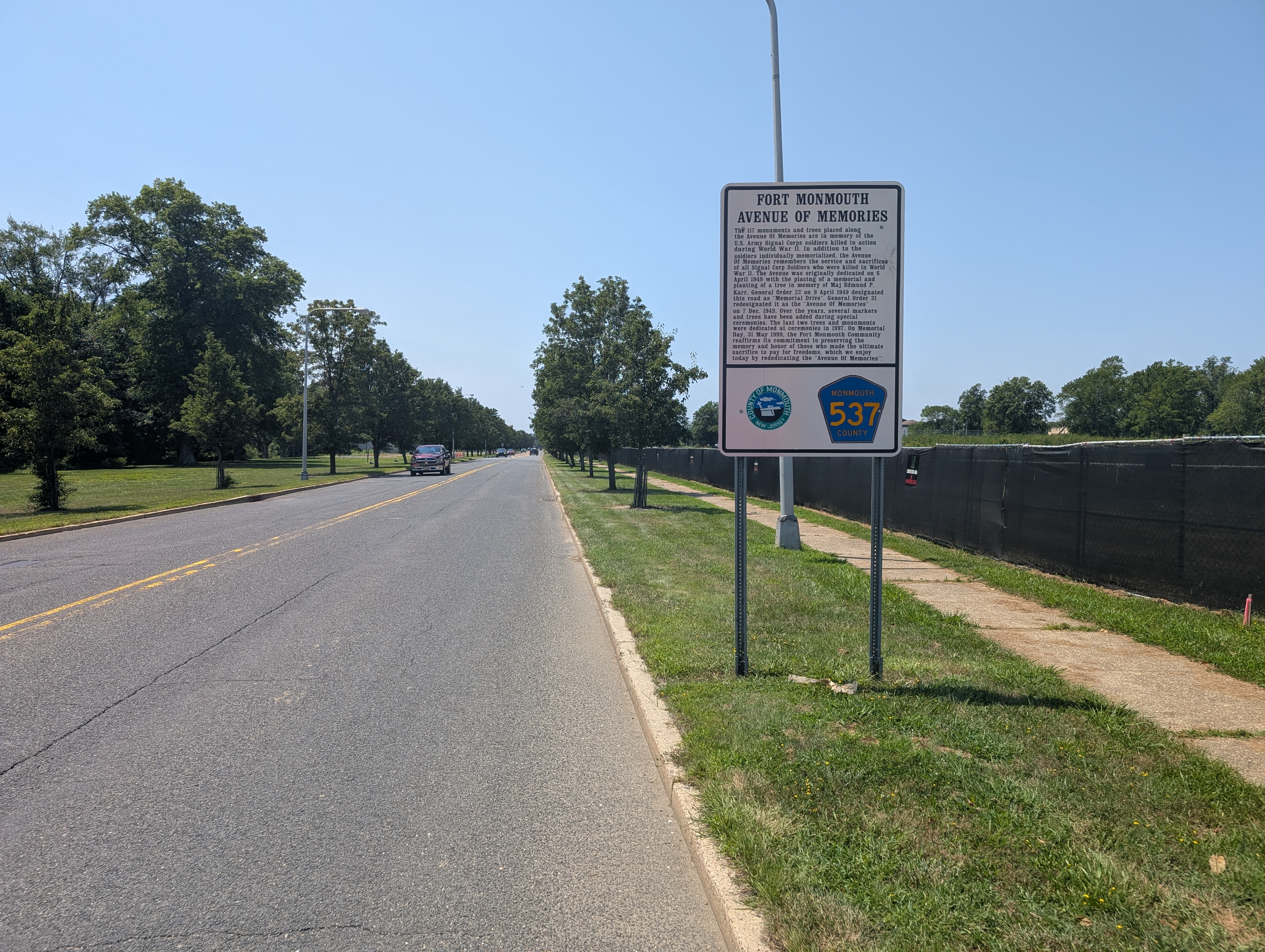
Sign describing the Avenue of Memories monuments

The post was selected for closure by the Base Realignment and Closure Commission in 2005. Most Army functions and personnel were required to be moved to Army facilities in Maryland’s Aberdeen Proving Ground and Ohio by 2011. The post officially closed on September 15, 2011. However, it was temporarily reopened in December 2012 for the evacuation of the borough of Paulsboro's residents following a freight train derailment on November 30, 2012.

Before its BRAC closing was announced, Fort Monmouth was the home to the CECOM Life Cycle Management Command (CECOM LCMC). CECOM LCMC was a lead command for the Army in the area of C4ISR development, acquisition and sustainment. Though no longer the home of the US Army Signal Corps (after its move to Fort Gordon, Georgia in the 1970s), Fort Monmouth is sometimes referred to as the "Soul of the Signal Corps". It housed the official Time capsule of the Army Signal Corps until June 21, 2010, when it was removed for relocation to the U.S. Army Signal Center & School at Fort Gordon, Georgia. The fort also hosts the Avenue of Memories, a set of trees and monuments dedicated to Signal Corp soldiers who died in World War II. The memorial is a part of the main road through the Eatontown side of the fort.

Fort Monmouth hosted the following CECOM LCMC subordinate organizations:

- Communications-Electronics Command, which supported and sustained C4ISR systems. Functional support centers of CECOM included the Software Engineering Center; Information Systems Engineering Command; Logistics and Readiness Center (LRC); Central Technical Support Facility (CTSF) and Tobyhanna Army Depot.
- CECOM Contracting Center, which performed market research, solicited, awarded and administered contracts, grants, cooperative agreements and other transactions for communications and electronics systems.
- Communications-Electronics Research, Development and Engineering Center which performed research and development in all areas of C4ISR, including Night Vision Goggles, countermeasure equipment against Improvised Explosive Devices, Shortstop Electronic Protection Systems, and sensor systems that provided soldiers with a safe method for rapidly inspecting wells and underground locations.
- Two subordinate offices of the Army Acquisition Executive; the Program Executive Office for Command, Control, Communications Tactical; the Program Executive Office for Intelligence, Electronic Warfare and Sensors; and elements of the Program Executive Office for Enterprise Information Systems (PEO EIS).

Also located on the post were:

- the Joint Interoperability Test Command, a suborganization of Defense Information Systems Agency which coordinated joint interoperability between the Army, Navy, Marines, Coast Guard, Air Force, Special Operations Forces and Combatant Commands;
- the United States Military Academy Preparatory School, which trained 250 cadet candidates each year for admittance and entrance as plebes (freshmen) into the United States Military Academy at West Point. The school was relocated to West Point in 2011.
- the 754th Explosive Ordnance Disposal unit, which provided emergency response to state and federal authorities throughout New Jersey, New York, Rhode Island, Connecticut, Massachusetts, New Hampshire, Maine and Pennsylvania, and,
- the Patterson Army Health Clinic which served DoD service members and their families, including those stationed at Naval Weapons Station Earle and U.S. Coast Guard Sandy Hook, NJ. It also served more than 7,000 veterans and their families, in support of the Veterans Administration (VA).

Most of the personnel located on the post were civilians employed by DoD, or employees of companies under contract with the DoD.

Fort Monmouth was also noted for its SunEagles Golf Course, one of the most prominent DoD golf courses in the nation. It is now open to the public.

School-aged children residing on post in grades 9 through 12 attended Monmouth Regional High School in Tinton Falls, part of the Monmouth Regional High School District.

=== Closure by BRAC ===
Fort Monmouth was recommended for closure by The Pentagon in May 2005. Base Realignment and Closure voted in August 2005 to close the post; its decision was upheld by President George Bush and Congress. An appeal headed by U.S. Representatives Frank Pallone and Rush D. Holt, Jr. to remove the post from the list was made to the BRAC commission, but was rejected.

In particular, BRAC recommended:

- Relocate the US Army Military Academy Preparatory School to West Point.
- Relocate the Joint Network Management System program, part of the Product Management Office for Network Operations - Current Force (PM NetOps-CF) to Fort Meade. The Joint Network Management System program was cancelled by the Headquarters, Department of the Army prior to scheduled relocation of the program to Fort Meade.
- Relocate the Budget/Funding, Contracting, Cataloging, Requisition Processing, Customer Services, Item Management, Stock Control, Weapon System Secondary Item Support, Requirements Determination, Integrated Materiel Management Technical Support Inventory Control Point functions for Consumable Items to Defense Supply Center, and reestablish them as Defense Logistics Agency Inventory Control Point functions.
- Relocate the procurement management and related support functions for depot level repairables to Aberdeen Proving Ground, MD, and designate them as Inventory Control Point functions, detachment of Defense Supply Center, Columbus, OH, and
- Relocate the remaining integrated materiel management, user, and related support functions to Aberdeen Proving Ground, along with Information Systems, Sensors, Electronic Warfare, and Electronics Research and Development & Acquisition.
- Relocate the elements of the Program Executive Office for Enterprise Information Systems and consolidate into the existing PEO EIS facilities at Fort Belvoir, Virginia.

The DoD estimated the closure of Fort Monmouth would cause the loss of 9,737 jobs (5,272 direct and 4,465 indirect jobs) between 2006 and 2011, leading to a 0.8% increase in unemployment. DoD also calculated the closure and other changes would save it about $1 billion in the long run.

However, in June 2007, an investigation by the Asbury Park Press revealed that the projected cost of closing Fort Monmouth and moving its research functions to Aberdeen, Maryland, had doubled from $780 million to $1.5 billion. To this was to be added the $3.3 billion loss to New Jersey's economy, coupled with the estimated $16 billion it would cost Maryland for needed infrastructure improvements to accommodate the largest job influx since World War II. In addition, recent Government Accountability Office (GAO) findings uncovered substantial errors in the Army estimation of BRAC cost savings—in one case turning a projected saving of $1 billion into one of just $31 million. In light of these issues, the House Armed Services Committee was to hold a hearing on the BRAC 2005 legislation. The final closure ceremony was held on September 15, 2011.

=== Redevelopment of the land ===
On April 28, 2006, Governor of New Jersey Jon Corzine signed into law the Fort Monmouth Economic Revitalization Act, which established the Fort Monmouth Economic Revitalization Planning Authority, to plan the redevelopment of Fort Monmouth once it closed. The legislation creating the commission, proposed by State Senators Joseph Kyrillos and Ellen Karcher, received bipartisan support, but only after wrangling in the legislature over its composition and authority. Fort Monmouth Economic Revitalization Planning Authority completed the Fort Monmouth Reuse and Redevelopment Plan in 2008, although an appellate court threw out the portion of the plan concerning affordable housing.

The Fort Monmouth Economic Revitalization Planning Authority is no longer active following the creation of the Fort Monmouth Economic Revitalization Planning Authority to provide investment, continuity and economic growth to the communities impacted by the federal government's decision to close Fort Monmouth. The bill was sponsored by Sen. Jennifer Beck (R-Monmouth) and Assembly members Joseph Cryan (D-Union), Albert Coutinho (D-Essex), Angel Fuentes (D-Camden), Annette Quijano (D-Union) and Upendra Chivukula (D-Somerset) and signed into law by Gov. Chris Christie Tuesday, August 17, 2010. The Fort Monmouth Economic Revitalization Planning Authority was to advance Fort Monmouth Economic Revitalization Authority's Reuse and Redevelopment Plan for economic development, growth and planning, with a focus on technology-based industries, for the 1,126 acres (456 ha) of real estate at Fort Monmouth following the base closure in September 2011.

The authority holds meetings at their headquarters, located in the former post library in Oceanport. As mandated by federal law, the authority must advertise for notices of interest from any state, county, municipal, or private, non-profit agency which would provide homeless assistance to Monmouth County residents.

In December 2016, the Monmouth County Board of Chosen Freeholders issued $33 million in bonds to allow Fort Monmouth Economic Revitalization Authority to purchase outright 560 acres (230 ha) of land on the base from the Army. As a condition of the bonds, the county reconstructed the main road through the base to allow for public travel between Route 35 / CR 537 and Oceanport Avenue for the first time since 2001. The road reopened on January 17, 2017 and subsequently became an extension of CR 537.

The Netflix contract comes after years of difficulty repurposing the property. In 2021, an early project proposal was to develop an arts community and cultural center within the fort. Delays in construction and infrastructure, as well as the COVID-19 pandemic, caused the project to be terminated.

In 2022, the Borough Council of Eatontown approved a proposal to develop 275 housing units in place of the fort's former housing, 55 of which would be affordable housing units. The Fort Monmouth Economic Revitalization Planning Authority also proposed further commercial development constituting a gas station, grocery store, and restaurant adjacent to said housing.

== See also ==
- Fort Hancock, New Jersey on Sandy Hook, enclosing Lower New York Bay.
- List of World War II military service football teams
- Marilyn Levy, a chemist at Fort Monmouth from 1953 to 1979
