= Earth–Moon–Earth communication =

Radio communications technique

Earth–Moon–Earth communication (EME), also known as Moon bounce, is a radio communications technique that relies on the propagation of radio waves from an Earth-based transmitter directed via reflection from the surface of the Moon back to an Earth-based receiver.

Geometry of an Earth-Moon-Earth communication link

== History ==
The use of the Moon as a passive communications satellite was proposed by W.J. Bray of the British General Post Office in 1940. It was calculated that with the available microwave transmission powers and low-noise receivers, it would be possible to beam microwave signals up from Earth and reflect them off the Moon. It was thought that at least one voice channel would be possible.

Radar reflections off the moon were received and recognized as such in 1943 during German experiments with radio measurement equipment, as reported by Dr. Ing. W. Stepp in Der Seewart magazine. Stepp noted a "perturbation", which "appeared, had a duration of several impulses, and larger impulse strength than the strongest nearby targets. It didn't appear until about two seconds after switching on the transmitter and disappeared (pulsatingly) correspondingly later after switching it off. But the rest of the echo image appeared and disappeared at the instance of switching the transmitter on/off. The 'perturbation' only occurred when the antenna was aimed to the east, and it disappeared immediately upon a major change of direction, but reappeared only about two seconds after rotating back to the original direction. Apparently we had detected the rising moon behind the clouds with the equipment. It explained the gradual disappearance of the impulses by the reflecting body slowly moving out of the strongly focussed, horizontally aimed beam, as it rises above the horizon."

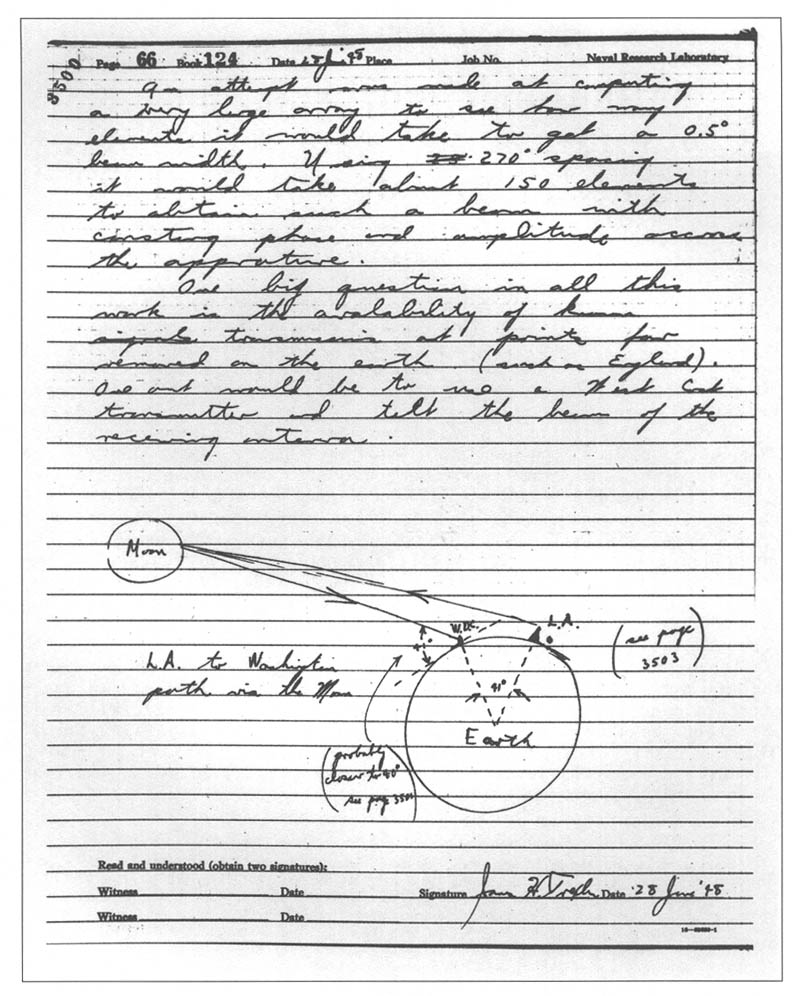
Analysis of communications link between Los Angeles and Washington D.C. via the moon in 1945

It was not until the close of World War II, however, that techniques specifically intended for the purpose of bouncing radar waves off the moon to demonstrate their potential use in defense, communication, and radar astronomy were developed. The first successful attempt was carried out at Fort Monmouth, New Jersey, on January 10, 1946, by a group code-named Project Diana, headed by John H. DeWitt. It was followed less than a month later, on February 6, 1946, by a second successful attempt, by a Hungarian group led by Zoltán Bay. The Communication Moon Relay project that followed led to more practical uses, including a teletype link between the naval base at Pearl Harbor, Hawaii and United States Navy headquarters in Washington, D.C. In the days before communications satellites, a link free of the volatility and problems of ionospheric propagation was revolutionary.

The development of communication satellites in the 1960s made this technique obsolete. However, radio amateurs took up EME communication as a hobby; the first amateur radio moon bounce communication took place in 1953, and amateurs worldwide still use the technique. Radio ham Ray Noughton (VK3ATN) of Birchip, Victoria, Australia accomplished Australia's first moon bounce with a home-built 250 m wide, 30 m antenna with a 100 watt signal in 1970. (NASA scientists, having had ridiculed his DIY project, claiming that at least a kilowatt would be required, invited him to the U.S., all expenses paid, to learn from his grassroots engineering. Naughton later became involved in Australia's first satellite, Australis-OSCAR 5).

The effect has even been put to artistic use. Composer Pauline Oliveros used moonbounce in her 1987 work Echoes from the Moon, and in 2024 German musician Hainbach experimented with moonbounce and created an audio plug-in to reproduce the effect.

== Current EME communications ==
EME SSB Transmission
A single sideband contact between IZ1BPN in Italy and PI9CAM at the Dwingeloo Radio Observatory, as received from PI9CAM's location. PI9CAM's transmission is shifted up in pitch slightly to compensate for IZ1BPN's transmission being shifted down by the Doppler effect. At the end of PI9CAM's transmission you can hear the echo of his signal returning from the Moon at a lower pitch due to the Doppler effect.

Amateur radio (ham) operators utilize EME for two-way communications. EME presents significant challenges to amateur operators interested in weak signal communication. EME provides the longest communications path that any two stations on Earth can use.

Amateur frequency bands from 50 MHz (6 meter wavelength) to 47 GHz (6.38 mm) have been used successfully, but most EME communications are on the 2 meter, 70-centimeter, or 23-centimeter bands. Common modulation modes are continuous wave with Morse code, digital (JT65, Q65, FT8) and when the link budgets allow, voice.

Recent advances in digital signal processing have allowed EME contacts, admittedly with low data rate, to take place with powers in the order of 100 watts and a single Yagi–Uda antenna.

World Moon Bounce Day, June 29, 2009, was created by Echoes of Apollo and celebrated worldwide as an event preceding the 40th anniversary of the Apollo 11 Moon landing. A highlight of the celebrations was an interview via the Moon with Apollo 8 astronaut Bill Anders, who was also part of the backup crew for Apollo 11. The University of Tasmania in Australia with their 26-meter (85') dish were able to bounce a data signal off the surface of the Moon which was received by a large dish in the Netherlands, Dwingeloo Radio Observatory. The data signal was successfully resolved back to data setting a world record for the lowest power data signal returned from the Moon with a transmit power of 3 milliwatts, about 1,000th of the power of a flashlight lamp. The second World Moon Bounce Day was April 17, 2010, coinciding with the 40th anniversary of the conclusion of the Apollo 13 mission.

In October 2009 media artist Daniela de Paulis proposed to the CAMRAS radio amateur association based at the Dwingeloo Radio Observatory to use Moon bounce for a live image transmission performance. As a result of her proposal, in December 2009 CAMRAS radio operator Jan van Muijlwijk and radio operator Daniel Gautchi made the first image transmission via the Moon using the open source software MMSSTV. De Paulis called the innovative technology "Visual Moonbounce" and since 2010 she has been using it in several of her art projects, including the live performance called OPTICKS, during which digital images are sent to the Moon and back in real time and projected live.

== Echo delay and time spread ==
Radio waves propagate in vacuum at the speed of light c, exactly 299,792,458 m/s. Propagation time to the Moon and back ranges from 2.4 to 2.7 seconds, with an average of 2.56 seconds (the average distance from Earth to the Moon is 384,400 km).

The Moon is nearly spherical, and its radius corresponds to about 5.8 milliseconds of wave travel time. The trailing parts of an echo, reflected from irregular surface features near the edge of the lunar disk, are delayed from the leading edge by as much as twice this value.

Most of the Moon's surface appears relatively smooth at the typical microwave wavelengths used for amateur EME. Most amateurs do EME contacts below 6 GHz, and differences in the moon's reflectivity are somewhat hard to discern above 1 GHz.

Lunar reflections are by nature quasi-specular (like those from a shiny ball bearing). The power useful for communication is mostly reflected from a small region near the center of the disk. The effective time spread of an echo amounts to no more than 0.1 ms.

Antenna polarization for EME stations must consider that reflection from a smooth surface preserves linear polarization but reverses the sense of circular polarizations.

At shorter wavelengths the lunar surface appears increasingly rough, so reflections at 10 GHz and above contain a significant diffuse component as well as a quasi-specular component. The diffuse component is depolarized, and can be viewed as a source of low level system noise. Significant portions of the diffused component arise from regions farther out toward the lunar rim. The median time spread can then be as much as several milliseconds. In all practical cases, however, time spreading is small enough that it does not cause significant smearing of CW keying or intersymbol interference in the slowly keyed modulations commonly used for digital EME. The diffused component may appear as significant noise at higher message data rates.

EME time spreading does have one very significant effect. Signal components reflected from different parts of the lunar surface travel different distances and arrive at Earth with random phase relationships. As the relative geometry of the transmitting station, receiving station and reflecting lunar surface changes, signal components sometimes add and sometimes cancel, depending on their phase relationship, creating large amplitude fluctuations in the received signal. These "libration fading" amplitude variations are well correlated over the coherence bandwidth (typically a few kHz). The libration fading components are related to the time spread of reflected signals.

== Modulation types and frequencies for EME ==
VHF

- CW
- JT65A, JT65B, Q65

UHF

- CW
- JT65, Q65
- SSB

Microwave

- CW
- SSB
- Q65

== Other factors influencing EME communications ==
The Doppler shift at 144 MHz is 300 Hz at moonrise and moonset. The Doppler offset reduces to around zero when the Moon is overhead. At other frequencies other Doppler offsets exist. At moonrise, returned 144 MHz signals are shifted approximately 300 Hz higher. As the Moon traverses the sky to a point due south or due north, the Doppler effect approaches zero. By moonset, it is shifted 300 Hz lower. The Doppler effect causes many problems when tuning into, and locking onto, signals from the Moon.

Polarization effects can reduce the strength of received signals. One component is the geometrical alignment of the transmitting and receiving antennas. Many antennas produce a preferred plane of polarization. Transmitting and receiving station antennas may not be aligned from the perspective of an observer on the moon. This component is fixed by the alignment of the antennas and stations may include a facility to rotate antennas to adjust polarization. Another component is Faraday rotation on the Earth–Moon–Earth path. The plane of polarization of radio waves rotates as they pass through ionized layers of the Earth's atmosphere. This effect is more pronounced at lower VHF frequencies and becomes less significant at 1296 MHz and above. Some of the polarization mismatch loss can be reduced by using a larger antenna array (more Yagi elements or a larger dish).

== Gallery ==
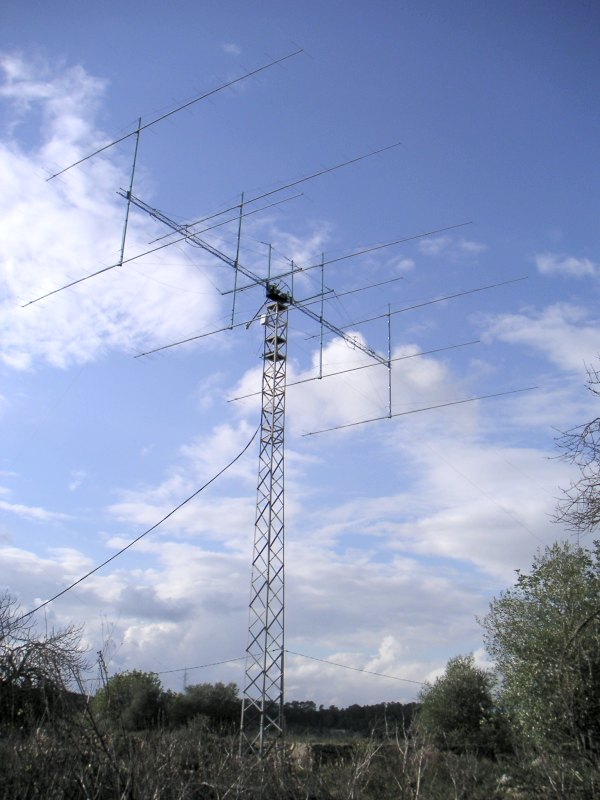
An array of eight Yagi antennas for 144 MHz EME at EA6VQ, Balearic Islands, Spain

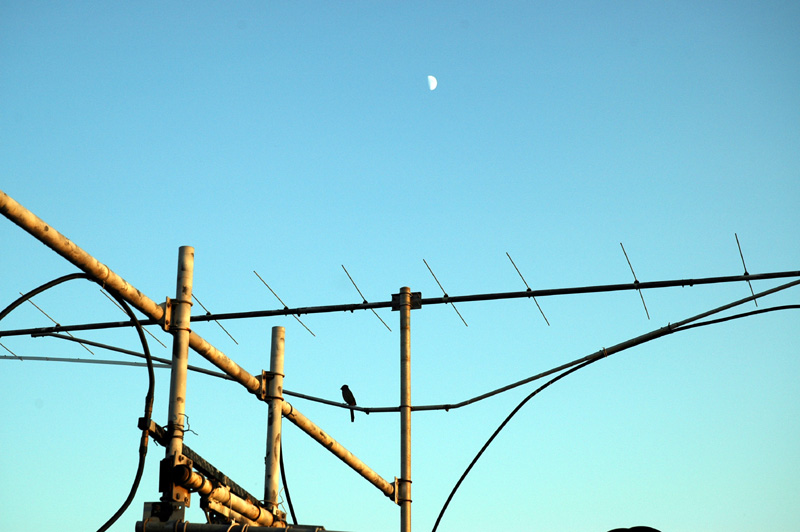
A part of 144 MHz EME antenna array at WA6PY in California, U.S.

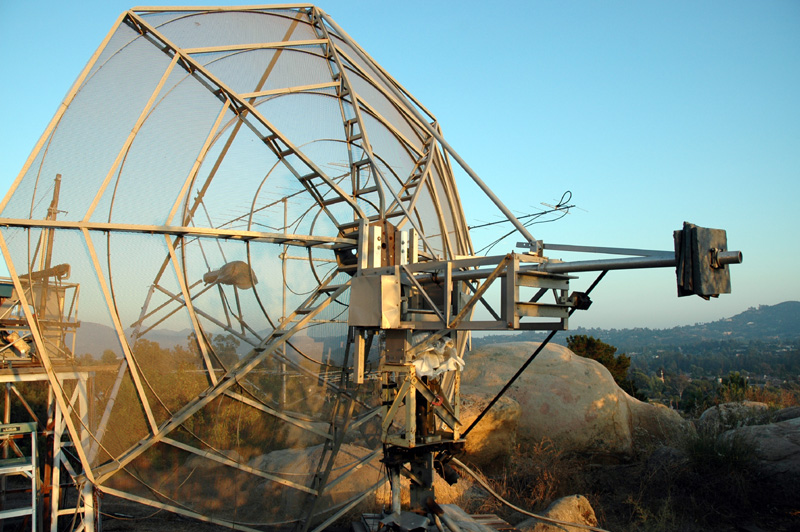
A dish antenna for microwave EME work at WA6PY, California, U.S.

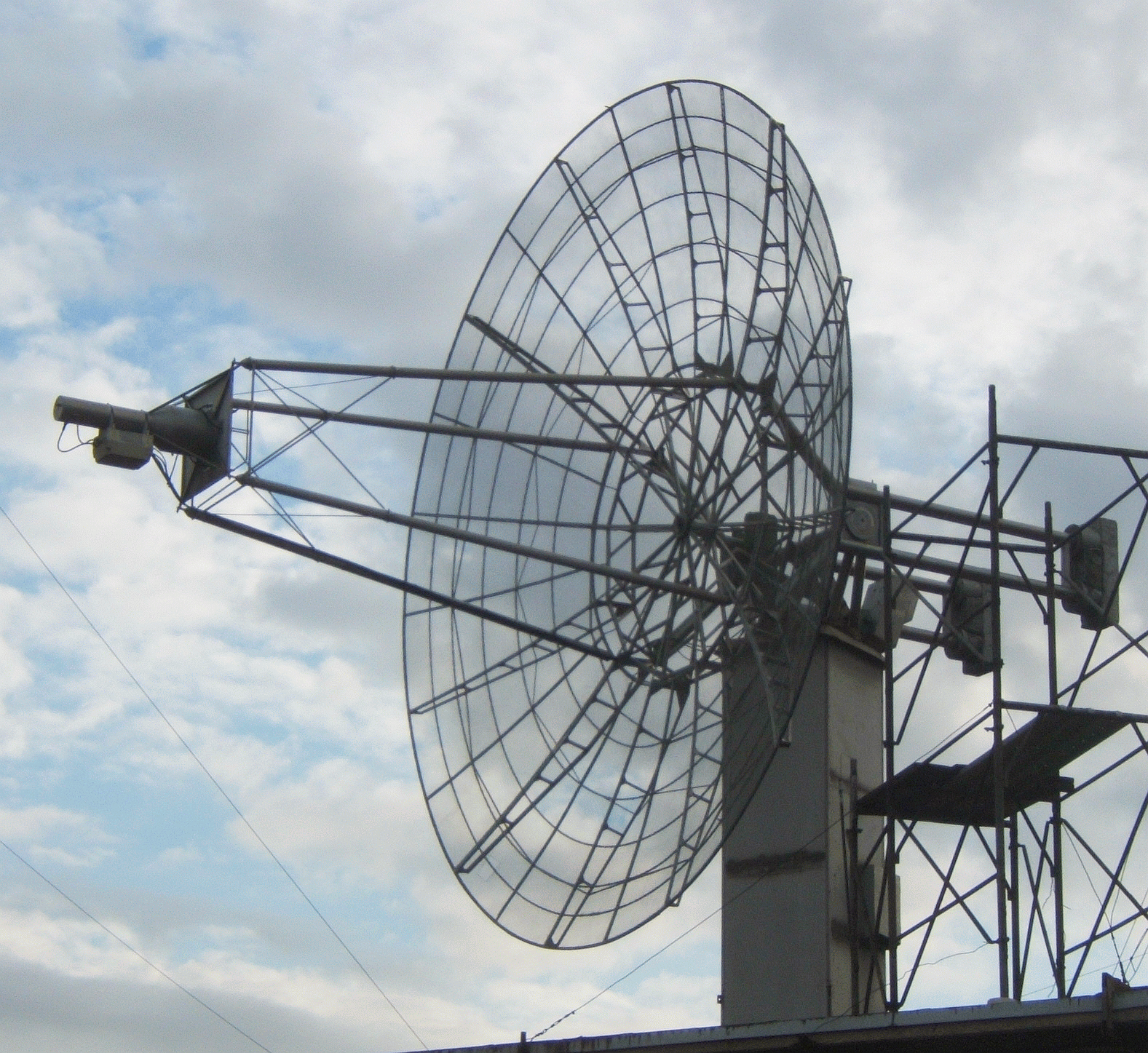
A dish antenna for UHF EME at I2FZX, Milan, Italy

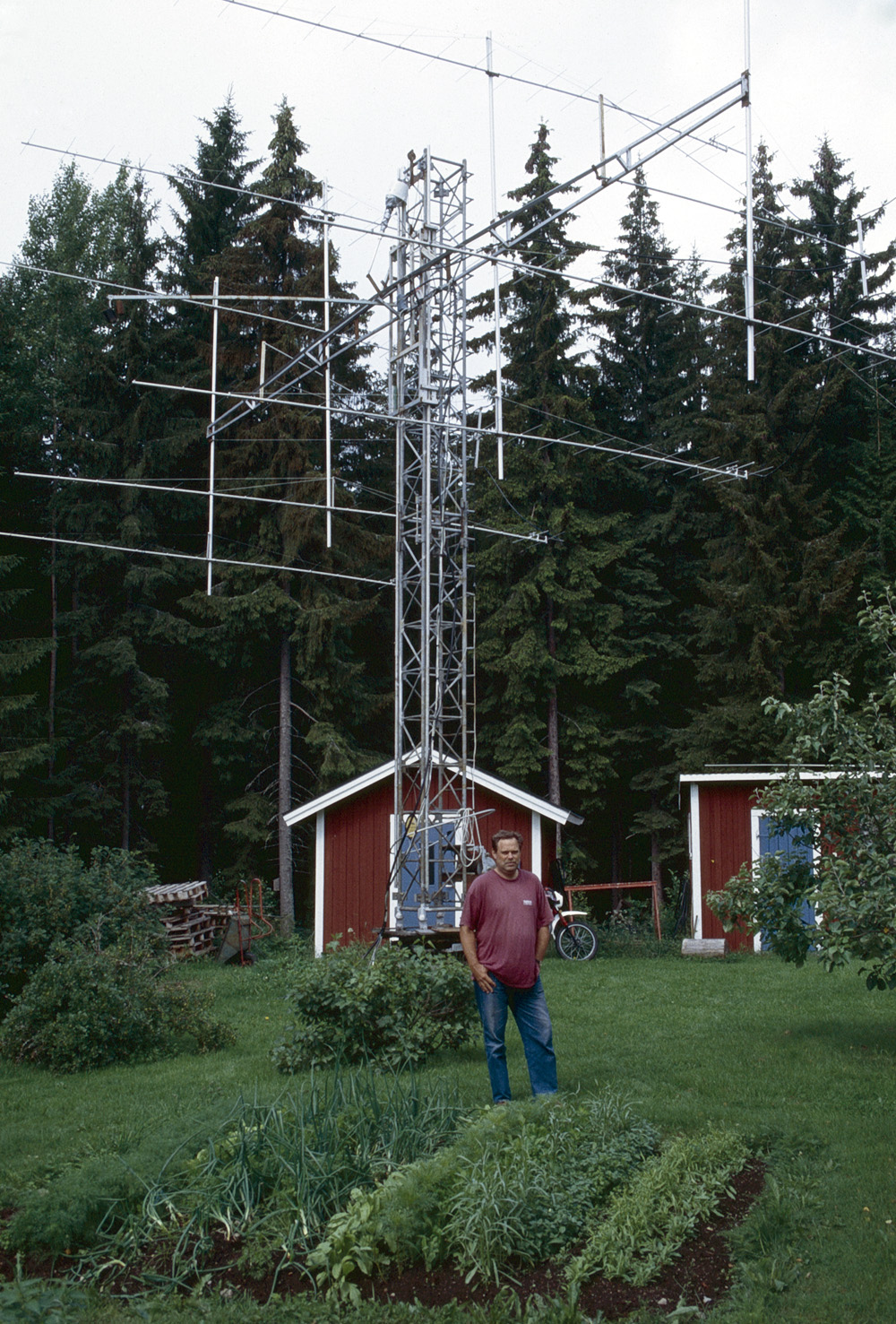
Amateur radio antenna array used for Earth–Moon–Earth communication on 144 MHz, Kilafors, central Sweden

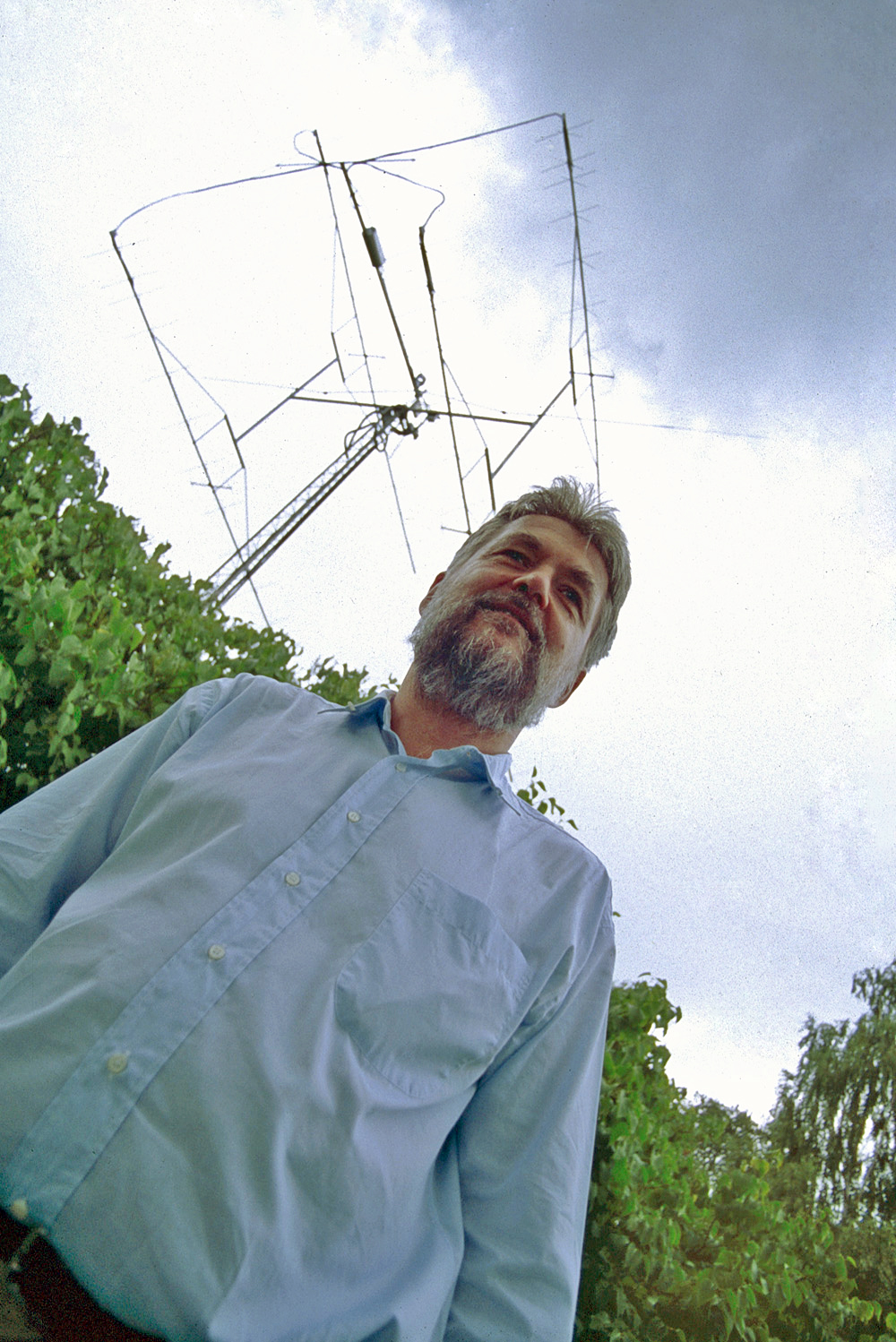
Amateur radio antenna array used for Earth–Moon–Earth communication on 144 MHz, Jäder, central Sweden

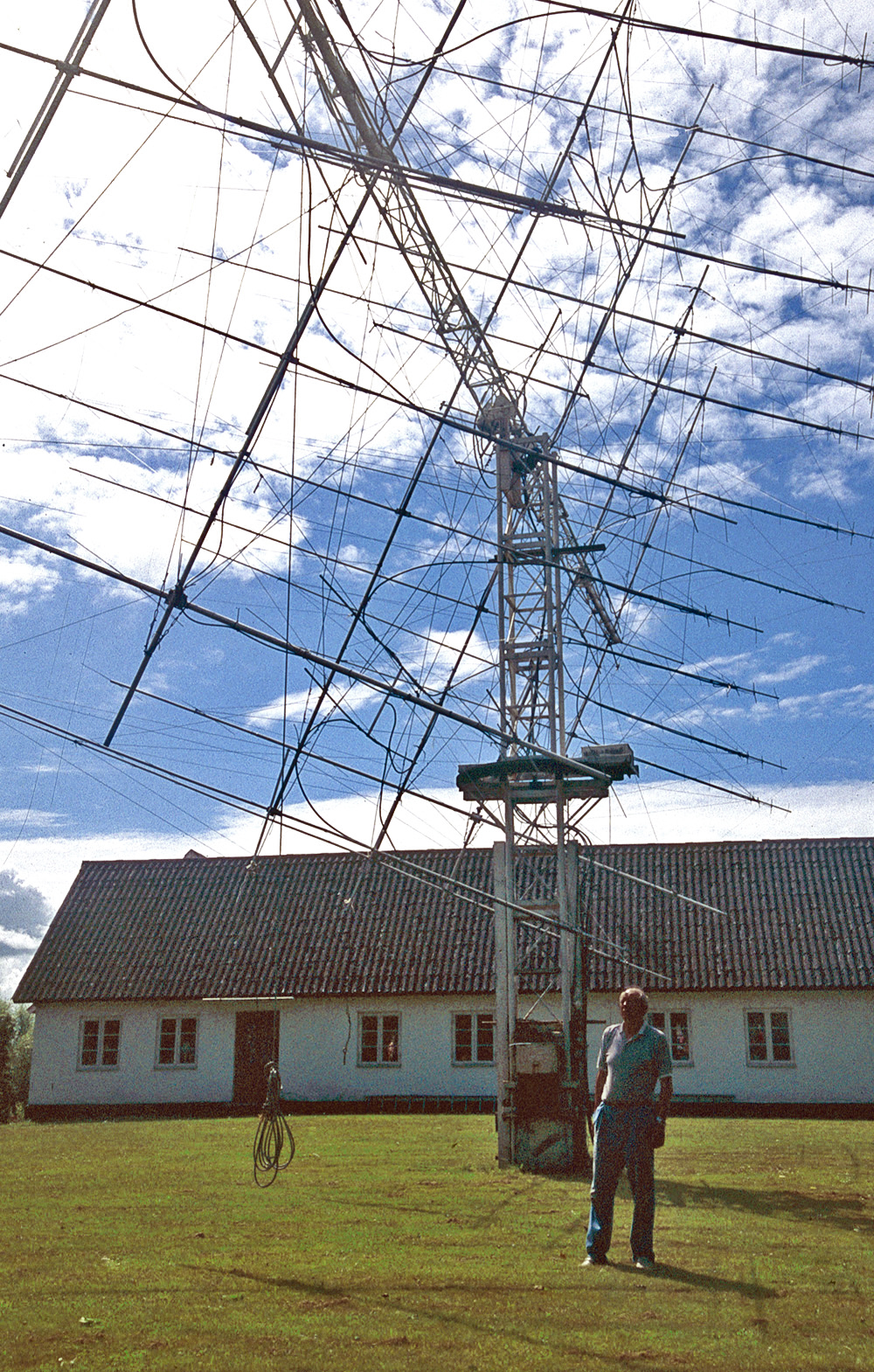
Amateur radio antenna array used for Earth–Moon–Earth communication on 144 MHz, Staffanstorp, southern Sweden

== See also ==
- Communication Moon Relay
- Information theory
- Lunar Laser Ranging experiment
- Meteor burst communications
- Passive repeater
- Radar equation
- Unified S-band
