= List of former United States Army installations =

The following is a list of United States Army installations that have been closed down.

== List ==
- Alaska
  - Fort Davis, Alaska
  - Port of Whittier, Alaska
- Alabama
  - Fort McClellan
  - Brookley Field
- Arizona
  - Camp Bouse
- Arkansas
  - Fort Logan H. Roots
- California
  - Camp Anza
  - Camp Callan
  - Camp Kearny
  - Camp Kohler
  - Camp Lawrence J. Hearn
  - Camp Lockett
  - Fort Humboldt
  - Fort MacArthur
  - Fort Mason
  - Camp McQuaide
  - Camp Santa Anita
  - Camp Seeley
  - Camp Stoneman
  - Camp Young
  - Castle Air Force Base
  - Desert Training Center
  - Fort Baker
  - Fort Ord
  - Fort Point
  - Fort Tejon
  - Fort Winfield Scott
  - Fort Yuma
  - Oakland Army Base
  - Mare Island Naval Shipyard
  - Mather Air Force Base
  - McClellan Air Force Base
  - Presidio of San Francisco
  - Sacramento Army Depot
  - San Carlos War Dog Training Center
- Colorado
  - Fitzsimons Army Medical Center
  - Camp Hale
  - Fort Garland
  - Camp George West Historic District COANG
  - Rocky Mountain Arsenal
- District of Columbia – Washington, D.C.
  - Camp Leach
  - Walter Reed Army Medical Center
- Florida
  - Camp Gordon Johnston
  - Camp Murphy
  - Daytona Beach WAC Training Center
- Georgia
  - Camp Conley
  - Camp Toccoa
  - Camp Wheeler
  - Fort Gillem
  - Fort McPherson
  - Naval Air Station Albany
  - Fort Oglethorpe
- Idaho
  - Idaho Launch Complex
- Illinois
  - Camp Lincoln
  - Camp Ellis
  - Camp Grant
  - Eighth Regiment Armory (Chicago)
  - Fort Sheridan
  - George Field
  - Green River Ordnance Plant
  - Joliet Army Ammunition Plant
  - Savanna Army Depot
- Indiana
  - Fort Benjamin Harrison
  - Newport Chemical Depot
- Kansas
  - Camp Phillips
- Louisiana
  - Camp Claiborne
  - Camp Livingston
  - Camp Pontchartrain
- Maryland
  - Edgewood Chemical Activity (aka: Edgewood Arsenal)
  - Fort Ritchie
  - Catoctin Training Center
  - Fort Holabird
  - Fort Howard (Maryland)
  - Fort Washington
  - Logan Field (Airport) (USAAF and POW Camp)
- Massachusetts
  - Camp Candoit
  - Camp Havedoneit
  - Camp Myles Standish
  - Camp Washburn
  - Camp Wellfleet
- Michigan
  - Fort Brady
  - Chrysler Tank School
- Minnesota
  - Camp Savage
  - Fort Snelling (ARNG)
- Mississippi
  - Camp Van Dorn
- Missouri
  - Camp Crowder
  - Fort Osage
  - Jefferson Barracks
- Montana
  - Fort Missoula
- Nebraska
  - Fort Kearny
  - Fort Robinson
  - Sioux Army Depot
- Newfoundland
  - Allan's Island Radar Station
  - Bell Island Battery
  - Cape Spear Radar Station
  - Elliston Ridge Radar Station
  - Fogo Island Radar Station
  - Goose Bay Army Airfield
  - Fort McAndrew
  - Harbor Defenses of St. John's
  - Fort Pepperrell
  - Stephenville Army Airfield
  - St. Bride's Radar Station
- Nevada
  - Camp Williston
- New Jersey
  - Camp Charles Wood
  - Camp Coles
  - Camp Edison
  - Camp Kilmer
  - Fort Hancock
  - Fort Monmouth
- New Mexico
  - Camp Cody
  - Fort Union
- New York
  - Camp Shanks
  - Camp Upton
  - Fort Niagara
  - Fort Totten
  - Madison Barracks
  - Plattsburgh Barracks
  - Seneca Army Depot
  - Fort Tilden
  - Fort Schuyler
  - Floyd Bennett Field
  - Fort Jay
  - Bush Army Terminal
  - Brooklyn Navy Yard
  - Fort Wadsworth
  - Fort Slocum
- North Carolina
  - Camp Bryan Grimes
  - Camp Dan Russell
  - Camp Davis
  - Camp Greene
  - Camp Shipp-Bagley
  - Fort Caswell
  - Fort Fisher
  - Fort Johnston
  - Fort Macon
  - Fort Totten
  - Laurinburg-Maxton Army Air Base
- North Dakota
  - Fort Abraham Lincoln
  - Camp Sutton
- Ohio
  - Camp Millard
  - Erie Proving Ground
  - Fort Hayes
- Oklahoma
  - Fort Arbuckle (1832-1834, Tulsa County)
  - Fort Arbuckle (1852-1870, Garvin County)
  - Camp Nichols
  - Fort Arbuckle
  - Fort Cobb
  - Fort Davis
  - Fort Gibson
  - Fort McCulloch
  - Fort Reno
  - Fort Supply
  - Fort Towson
  - Fort Washita
  - Fort Wayne
- Oregon
  - Camp Abbott
  - Camp Adair
  - Camp Sherman
  - Fort Stevens (Oregon)
  - Camp White
- Pennsylvania
  - Shenango Personnel Replacement Depot
- Puerto Rico
  - Fort Brooke
  - Henry Barracks
- South Carolina
  - Camp Croft
- Tennessee
  - Camp Forrest
  - Camp Tyson
- Texas
  - Camp Barkeley
  - Camp Howze
  - Camp Hulen
  - Fort Brown
  - Fort Clark
  - Fort D.A. Russell
  - Fort McIntosh
  - Fort Ringgold
  - Ingleside Army Depot
  - Lone Star Army Ammunition Plant
  - Longhorn Army Ammunition Plant
- Vermont
  - Lyndonville Air Force Listening Station
- Virginia
  - Camp Patrick Henry
  - Chopawamsic Training Center
  - Fort Monroe
  - Front Royal Quartermaster Depot
  - Vint Hill Farms Station
- Washington
  - Camp Bonneville
  - Fort Canby
  - Fort Casey
  - Fort Columbia
  - Fort Lawton
  - Mount Rainier Ordnance Depot
  - Fort Steilacoom
  - Vancouver Barracks
  - Fort Worden
  - Walla Walla Army Air Base
- Wyoming
  - Fort Francis E. Warren
  - Fort Laramie National Historic Site
  - Wyoming National Guard Camp

== See also ==
- List of United States military bases
- List of United States Army airfields
- List of United States Navy installations
- List of United States Marine Corps installations
- List of United States Air Force installations
- List of United States Space Force installations
- Lists of military bases
