= Camp Lockett =

Former United States Army military post

- Part of California
- 2nd Cavalry Division's shoulder sleeve insignia

Site information
- Type: United States Army outpost
- Owner: Campo Fire and Rescue Department; County of San Diego; San Diego County Sheriff' Department; Rancho del Campo juvenile facility Multiple private parties
- Controlled by: San Diego County and multiple private parties
- Open to the public: Partially
- Condition: Partially abandoned

Location
- Camp Lockett
- Location within California Location within the United States
- Coordinates: 32.608056°N 116.471667°W

Site history
- Built: 1941
- In use: 1876–1946

Garrison information
- Past commanders: COL Waldemar Falck; BG Thoburn K. Brown
- Garrison: 1st Cavalry Regiment; 10th Cavalry Regiment; 11th Cavalry Regiment; 28th Cavalry Regiment

Camp Lockett
- Interactive map of Camp Lockett

California Historical Landmark
- Designated: 2009
- Reference no.: 1045

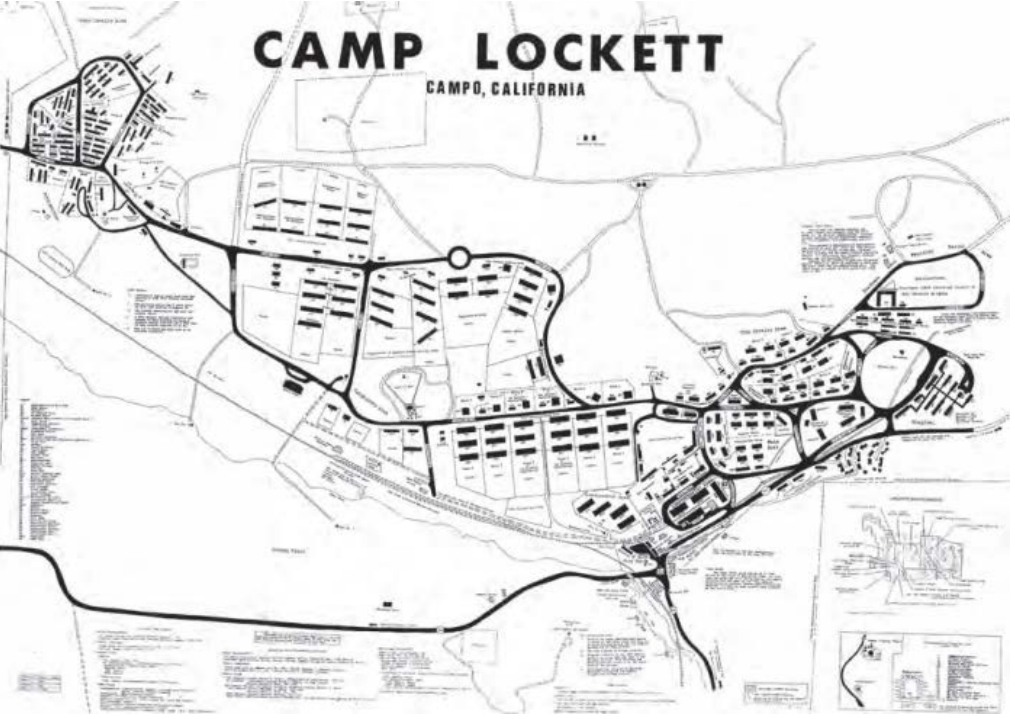
World War II map of Camp Lockett

Camp Lockett was a United States Army military post in Campo, California, east of San Diego, and north of the Mexican border. Camp Lockett has historical connections to the Buffalo Soldiers due to the 10th and 28th Cavalry Regiments having been garrisoned there during World War II. It was named in honor of Colonel James R. Lockett who fought in the Spanish–American War, Philippine Insurrection, and the Punitive Expedition. There was an active preservation effort underway with long-term plans of creating the 'Camp Locket Historic District' in the National Register of Historic Places, which ended due to private property concerns. In 2009 it was designated as a California Historical Landmark, and there are plans to create a county park out of the majority of its former area.

== History ==
=== 19th century ===
Although travel through the area had been occurring for centuries, with the Diegueño Native Americans having lived there long before European settlement, it wasn't until the end of the 1860s and the early 1870s when a permanent Non-Native American settlement was established in the Campo Valley area. The area was settled by people migrating west from Texas, so much so that the area at one time was called "Little Texas". In 1869, John Capron established a regular stagecoach run from San Diego, by way of Dulzura and Campo, to Yuma which continued to run until 1912.

As in many places in the American Southwest, this immigration brought new interactions between the people living in the area, including the Mexicans who lived not too far to the south. A telegraph line and a stop for the stagecoach were established, and run by the Larkin family. This brought additional commerce to the area; however, with commerce came crime. On December 4, 1875, a gunfight between the citizens of Campo and a group of Mexican bandits, who had earlier killed the former Governor of Baja California Antonio Sosa in a robbery, took place at Gaskill Brothers' Stone Store. After all was said and done the events of that day led to eight dead and two wounded. Company G of the 1st Cavalry Regiment was sent by order of Major General John Schofield to San Diego to provide armed assistance to the area. Lieutenant Storey commanded a detachment of ten troopers, detaching four troopers to conduct "outpost" duty after shooting himself in the hip, thus providing the first soldiers to be stationed in what would be Camp Lockett.

In May 1876, a large assembly of outlaws assembled in Tecate to attempt to rob the stagecoach station. The company was sent east to assist under the command of Captain Reuben F. Bernard, a veteran of the Modoc War; this dispersed the would-be assailants. In the summer of that same year, a group of Native Americans came north from Mexico and began living off the Larkin Family's cattle. Contacting the Alcalde (mayor) of Tecate, Pete Larkin was advised to confront the Native Americans. The confrontation became a fight, leading to the death of a Native American. This brought reprisal when the chief of the Native Americans asked for protection from the Alcalde, who subsequently assembled a posse and drove the cattle south of the border. Again the Cavalry came east to assist, which led to the abandoning of the cattle by the posse of the Alcalde and the posse's dispersal. This led the increase to the size of those on "outpost" duty to that of a squad.

By 1877 the squad's duty ended as the 1st Cavalry Regiment was sent north due to the Little Big Horn Campaign, being replaced in San Diego by H Company, 8th Infantry Regiment. Company H was later replaced by Company I of the same Infantry Regiment in 1878 due to the Bannock Campaign. They would remain in San Diego until at least 1898, however no significant military presence would be seen Campo until 1895. In that year, about forty Yaquis were pressed into the Mexican Army, and later mutinied in Ensenada; in doing so they killed three people including their Captain's wife, and began to flee northward to obtain horses to travel back to where they came from. In response the U.S. Army sent ten infantrymen under the command of Lieutenant Hubert to Campo. Although a farm was raided, the infantry's presence prevented the group from continuing further into the United States, and they were eventually subdued by Mexican Militia forces south of Jacumba.

=== World War I ===
In response to the Zimmermann Telegram it was decided that detachments of the 11th Cavalry Regiment would be stationed along the US–Mexico border. In part this was done by stationing Troop E at what would become Camp Lockett in 1918, named after the 4th Colonel in command of the 11th Cavalry Regiment. Troop E would remain stationed there until August 1920 when they were relocated to the Presidio of Monterey, and replaced by Troop D of the same regiment. Later on in that same year the force at Campo would be reduced to that of a platoon, while the rest of the Troop moved to Camp Lawrence J. Hearn at Palm City, near present-day Imperial Beach. Eventually both locations would be abandoned when the Regiment was recombined in Monterey in the 1920s.

=== World War II ===
==== First construction phase in 1941 ====
The first phase of construction, which occurred in 1941, housed the 11th Cavalry Regiment. Standard Army Quartermaster Corps Series 700 and 800 plans were used for the original camp and included housing areas (barracks, officers quarters, day room, mess hall, and storehouse), stable areas (stables, blacksmith shops, and hay sheds), a veterinary facility, the quartermaster area, motor pool area, hospital (staff quarters and wards), administration buildings, recreation buildings, a chapel, and post exchange.

Original infrastructure included roads and streets, a sewage treatment plant, incinerator, and water supply system. Importantly, during this time several buildings from the pre-Army era were converted to military support uses, including the 1885 Gaskill Stone Store. By November 1941, Camp Lockett housing was ready for occupancy. It was the last base built for California in the nation. Along with thousands of Soldiers and horses, there lived a track supervisor for the San Diego and Arizona Eastern Railway lived on the base, which encircled its Campo Depot.

In 1942, the Army transferred the 11th Cavalry Regiment to Fort Benning, Georgia and converted it to motorized armor. At Camp Lockett, the 10th Cavalry Regiment replaced the 11th Cavalry Regiment. As war mobilization continued new troopers were organized into the 28th Cavalry Regiment, forming the 4th Cavalry Brigade of the 2nd Cavalry Division.

The Western Defense Command's Southern Land Frontier Sector also moved to Camp Lockett at this time. This command consisted primarily of administrative personnel responsible for planning the defense of southern Arizona and California; they fell under General John L. DeWitt, whom surveyed what would be Camp Lockett in 1940. As was common at the time, the base was segregated, with African-American Soldiers from the base being refused service in nearby Jacumba.

==== Second construction phase of 1942–1943 ====
The expanded presence necessitated a second phase of construction from 1942 to 1943, which conformed to standard Theater of Operations plans, an even more expedient construction than the mobilization architecture utilized in the first phase.

Most of the new construction centered on additional stable and troop housing areas for the 28th Cavalry Regiment one mile north of the original encampment. The 28th area included additional stables, hay sheds, and blacksmith shops. The original veterinary complex was expanded for the 2nd Veterinary Company.

Additional troop areas included a regimental headquarters, barracks, mess halls, latrines, and storerooms. Support buildings in the 28th Cavalry area included a post exchange, chapel, motor pool, and fire station. Recreational additions included the swimming pool complex between the 10th and 28th Cavalry areas, additional NCO and Officers’ Clubs, a gymnasium, and the outdoor amphitheater Merritt Bowl. Civilian housing and single-status dormitories were also constructed. Due to this expansion the Campo border crossing was closed.

In early 1944, the 4th Cavalry Brigade was sent to North Africa then disbanded and converted into service units. With their departure from Camp Lockett, the era of the horse soldier ended. Camp Lockett was in stand-by status for several months.

Army Service Forces shoulder sleeve insignia

==== Convalescent hospital activated in 1944 ====
In July 1944, the Army Service Forces activated the Mitchell Convalescent Hospital at former Camp Lockett. The hospital was the first Army Service Forces convalescent hospital in the United States. To expand the original Camp Lockett hospital, many buildings were moved and converted to hospital wards and other uses. The hospital was named in honor of Civil War physician, Salis W Mitchell.

==== Prisoner of war camp established in 1944 ====
Concurrent with activation of the convalescent hospital was the establishment of the prisoner of war camp in the 28th Cavalry Regiment area. The POW camp, a branch of the Riverside County Camp Haan, housed Italian and German prisoners of war, who worked in all phases of hospital operation, including services, maintenance, and construction. German and Italian prisoners were transferred from Camp Haan to Mitchell Convelesent Hospital. The hospital closed on March 22, 1946.

=== Base closure ===
The convalescent hospital remained active at Camp Lockett until June 1946, when the facility closed and the installation was declared surplus. Starting in 1949 the Army began to close the base. Leased properties reverted to their original owners, 600 acres were transferred to the County of San Diego, and 39 acres were transferred to the Mountain Empire Union High School District. Part of it was repurposed as a juvenile detention ranch facility by San Diego probation department. The Juvenile Ranch Facility was located at Camp Lockett. There were two primary facilities, Rancho del Campo and Rancho del Rayo.

== Current status ==
In 2003, the former military base was designated a Historic District by the State of California. In 2009, the San Diego County Probation Department said it was planning to shut down their facilities at what was Camp Lockett.

=== Buildings and structures ===
The district includes 52 standing buildings and two structures or complexes of structures built during the period of significance. Two contributing building were constructed before the establishment of Camp Lockett but were used by the U.S. Army during the period of significance.

The primary categories of functional building types associated with the period of significance are present in the district. With few exceptions, the buildings constructed by the Army are wood-framed, mobilization-style architecture supported on concrete piers or slabs. Infrastructure buildings, such as those in the sewage disposal plant, are built of poured concrete.

Most of the surviving buildings and structures date from the early phase of construction in 1941; there are no standing Theater of Operations-style buildings dating from the 1942–43 period of construction. Several of the contributors were moved during the period of significance, in conjunction with establishment of the Mitchell Convalescent Hospital in 1944.

Built properties contributing to the Camp Lockett Cultural Landscape Historic District represent a wide range of functional types from the historic period of significance. Personnel support functions are represented in mess halls, day rooms, officers’ quarters, supply buildings.

Recreational buildings include the base theater, swimming pool (now filled), and bathhouses. Buildings associated with care of the horses include stables and blacksmith shop. General support buildings include firehouse, guardhouse, maintenance, motor pool garage, and cellblock.

The hospital area contains administrative buildings, barracks, wards, mess halls, storehouses, dispensary, and civilian employee housing. Camp infrastructure properties include the sewage plant, portions of the water system, and the incinerator.

Pre-Lockett buildings utilized by the Army during the period of significance include the Gaskill Brothers Stone Store and the Ferguson Ranch House.

=== Historic archaeological features ===
Historic archaeological features, especially foundations, representing a range of building and structure types from the period of significance contribute to the district and are enumerated as features within one site for this nomination. A total of 47 features resulting from original barracks, day rooms, mess halls, storehouses, officers’ quarters, chapel, and stables are present.

The Western Defense Command's Southern Land Frontier Sector headquarters building is represented in an archaeological feature.

Landscape features contributing to the district include original circulation routes, mortared field stone hardscape features, patterned plantings, and open training areas. Eleven circulation routes laid out as part of original camp construction remain in the district.

In several locations, mortared stone retaining walls and drainage features accompany the circulation routes. Patterned plantings dating from the period of significance, as well as the oak grove in Chaffee Park also contribute to the district.

The Italian Prisoners of War Shrine, which is located about a mile north of the main encampment, also contributes to the district as a landscape element. The shrine is mortared into a bedrock outcrop and features a glass-enclosed Catholic statuette and engraved stone.

== Portrayal in popular media ==
A reunion of former cavalrymen at Camp Lockett was featured on the PBS TV program California's Gold.

== See also ==
- La Posta Mountain Warfare Training Facility
