= James McClendon =

James McClendon may refer to:

- James William McClendon Jr. (1924–2000), American Christian theologian and ethicist
- James A. McClendon (died 1992), American lawyer, judge and politician in Illinois
- Jim McClendon (born 1943), American optometrist and politician in Alabama
