= Camp Leach =

World War I–era U.S. Army camp in Washington, D.C.

- Part of American University
- Washington, D.C.
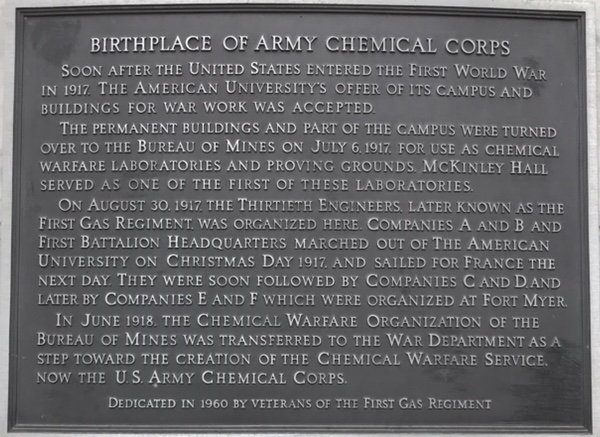
- This sign at American University in Washington, D.C. commemorates the establishment of the U.S. Army Chemical Corps in June 1918.

Site information
- Type: Temporary camp
- Owner: War Department
- Operator: Chemical Warfare Service
- Controlled by: Corps of Engineers

Location
- Location of Camp Leach
- Coordinates: 38°56′8.98″N 77°5′21.54″W
- Area: 11 acres (4.5 ha)

Site history
- In use: 1917–1919
- Fate: Abandoned, ordered salvaged
- Battles/wars: World War I

Camp Leach, formerly known as the American University Experimental Station and Camp American University, was a World War I era United States Army camp built by the Corps of Engineers on American University property in Washington, D.C. It was named in honor of Colonel Smith S. Leach, Corps of Engineers. The camp was established in 1917 for the organization of engineer units and subsequently used by the Chemical Warfare Service. Abandoned in January 1919, it was ordered salvaged.

== History ==
During World War I, American University allowed the United States Army to use part of its campus for weapons development and testing. In 1917, 24 days after the U.S. declared war on Germany, the school offered its property to the war effort. The military activities at American University (i.e. Chemical warfare experiment station; Pharmacological Research Section and Pathology Section of Medical Division, Chemical Warfare Service; and Camp Leach) were considered at the time to be "the largest laboratory this side of the sun or other burning stars." Thus, American University became the birthplace of the United States' chemical weapons program. About 100,000 soldiers and 2,000 chemists were employed on campus. What is now Spring Valley was an undeveloped area on campus where the Army was allowed to use for testing chemical weapons, such as mustard gas.

At the far corner of American University, the United States Army also tested some of its weapons. When the war ended it was reported that $800,000 (in 1918-dollars) worth of World War I munitions were buried in a pit in the same corner of the university.

== Environmental impact ==
In 1993, during excavations of a utility trench, construction workers found unexploded ordnance, and scientists found high levels of arsenic in the soil. The next day it was reported in The Washington Post that World War I bomb shells had been unearthed near a senator's house bordering the campus. This touched off a cleanup effort by the Environmental Protection Agency and the Corps of Engineers who called it the Spring Valley Formerly Used Defense Site. This cleanup lasted nearly two years.

In 2003 many more dangerous sites in the area were uncovered, including perchlorate in groundwater and three burial pits on grounds of the South Korean ambassador's residence. In 2005 the Agency for Toxic Substances and Disease Registry issued a "Health Consultation"' and two years later Johns Hopkins University was contracted for a health study. The site, which included a corner of American University and several neighboring residences, including the residence of the Embassy of South Korea, which occupies a significant percentage of the site. As no buildings have been built directly atop the site, the Corps of Engineers announced that the effects of neither the residual chemicals nor the cleanup program will have any effects on the students.

== See also ==
- List of former United States Army installations
