= 2nd Cavalry Division (United States) =

- Shoulder sleeve insignia of the 2nd Cavalry Division.
- Active: 20 August 1921–15 July 1942; 25 February 1943–10 May 1944
- Country: United States of America
- Branch: United States Army
- Type: Cavalry
- Size: Division
- Nickname: Buffalo Soldiers
- Engagements: World War II; European-African-Middle Eastern Theater

Commanders
- Notable commanders: Terry de la Mesa Allen, Sr. Benjamin O. Davis Sr.

The 2nd Cavalry Division was a cavalry division of the United States Army that was constituted from 1921 to 1944, with the headquarters active for two brief periods before and during U.S. involvement in World War II. The division was disbanded in 1944.

== Heraldry ==
Shoulder sleeve insignia

- Description: On a yellow Norman shield with a green border, a blue chevron below two eight-pointed blue stars.
- Blazon: Or, a chevron azure, in chief 2 mullets of eight points of the second, a bordure vert.
- Symbolism: The shield is yellow, the Cavalry color. The stars (representing spur rowells) are taken from the coat of arms of the 2d Cavalry Regiment, which had initially been a part of the division.
- Worn from 20 August 1921 – 10 May 1944

== History ==
=== Interwar period ===
The 2nd Cavalry Division was constituted in the Regular Army on 20 August 1921, allotted to the Seventh Corps Area, and assigned to the Second Army. Although the division headquarters was not activated until 1 April 1941, many of the units of the division were active from 1921 to 1940, and many others were active as "Regular Army Inactive" (RAI) units by being manned with personnel of the Organized Reserve. The active elements of the division in the 1920s and 1930s consisted mainly of the cavalry regiments, Troop A, 9th Engineer Squadron, the various artillery units assigned during the period, and elements of the quartermaster train (later the 17th Quartermaster Squadron). The division's designated mobilization station was Fort Riley, Kansas, where many of the units were concentrated in the 1920s and 1930s, and where they conducted their annual summer training. On 15 August 1927, under special instructions from the War Department, the division was reorganized to consist of the 2nd, 4th, 12th, and 14th Cavalry Regiments, the 4th Field Artillery Battalion, and the 16th Observation Squadron. Other active elements assigned were the 14th Ordnance Company and the 5th, 6th, and 7th Pack Trains. The division Headquarters and Headquarters Troop (HHT), 3rd and 4th Cavalry Brigade HHTs, 2nd Signal Troop, and 8th Pack Train were to be formed from unit and post support personnel at Fort Riley, while the quartermaster train headquarters, 27th and 28th Wagon Companies, and the 2nd Medical Squadron were to be formed from post support personnel at Fort Leavenworth. The rest of the units were to be activated from existing units at Fort Riley and RAI units in the Organized Reserve.

After RAI units were authorized to be manned by Reserve personnel in 1926, units of the 2nd Cavalry Division began to be organized in the Seventh Corps Area, with most being concentrated in the Kansas City metropolitan area. The 3rd and 4th Machine Gun Squadrons (which were to be formed from cadre from the 2nd Machine Gun Troop at Fort Riley), division special troops, and later, the inactive elements of the 2nd Armored Car Squadron were all organized with reservists in Kansas City. These units conducted their summer training at Fort Riley, and therefore had a relatively close association with the division units located there. Thus, in the event of mobilization, the 2nd Cavalry Division was most likely to be the first inactive division to be able to completely mobilize. Like many of the inactive Regular Army divisions, the 2nd Cavalry Division headquarters was organized provisionally from time to time for command post exercises, particularly those involving the exercises of the I Cavalry Corps.

As part of the general buildup of the US Army prior to World War II, the War Department directed the activation of the division at Fort Riley in the fall of 1940, where the majority of the division's active units were already concentrated. The first major element activated was the 3rd Cavalry Brigade on 15 October 1940, followed by the 4th Cavalry Brigade (Colored) on 21 February 1941, and the division headquarters on 1 April 1941. The 4th Cavalry Brigade's regiments, the only two available for assignment, were segregated units; the division, therefore, was unique to Army structure at that time, a racially mixed unit.

Neither Fort Riley or the adjacent Camp Funston had adequate facilities for the division's mounted units, personnel shortages continued, and divisional elements were activated using provisional assets. General John Millikin, the 2nd Cavalry Division commander in June 1941, envisioned a combined use of mechanized and horse cavalry within the division. During July, Troop A, 2nd Reconnaissance Squadron, was formed provisionally as a mechanized divisional element. The division, now organized with horses, scout cars, jeeps and motorcycles, spent most of the rest of the summer training with its new equipment.

The 2nd Cavalry Division participated in the Second Army Maneuvers of late August as a component of the "Red" forces facing the VII Corps' "Blue" army. Given the task of capturing Arkansas and Louisiana, the 2nd's mission ended on 9 September with divisional elements located at Chatham, Louisiana. During the next week, the division became part of a second training operation. This time, the division served with the Second Army's "Red" force, now challenging the Third Army's "Blue" force. Second Army's first goal was to defeat and remove the Blue forces from southern Louisiana, and then to keep the enemy from capturing Shreveport. At the close of these maneuvers, the 2nd Cavalry Division returned to Kansas, having prevailed with Blue forces still forty miles from the city.

By 2 November, the division possessed a number of its organic support troops, although most were still functioning in a provisional status. The end of the month found the division involved in another set of training maneuvers. The operation, called "PRACTICE BLITZKRIEG," was based in Kansas, and finished with the 2nd Cavalry Division's capture of Topeka. The exercise ended when the divisional military police unit "seized" the governor, who feigned a surrender of the state.

==== Organization 1940 ====
One asterisk indicates the unit was partially inactive. The headquarters location shown was the mobilization location. Two asterisks indicates the unit was organized with Organized Reserve personnel as an RAI unit. Three asterisks indicates the unit was not organized, and the headquarters location shown was the mobilization location. Units assigned to the 2nd Cavalry Division in 1940 included:

- Headquarters, 2nd Cavalry Division (Kansas City, Kansas) ***
- Headquarters, Special Troops (Kansas City, Kansas) **
  - Headquarters Troop (Kansas City, Kansas)
  - 2nd Signal Troop (Des Moines, Iowa) **
  - 14th Ordnance Company (Medium) (Fort Riley, Kansas)
- 3rd Cavalry Brigade
  - 2nd Cavalry Regiment
  - 14th Cavalry Regiment
  - Weapons Troop
- 4th Cavalry Brigade (C) **
  - 9th Cavalry Regiment (C)
  - 10th Cavalry Regiment (C)
  - Weapons Troop (C)
- 2nd Reconnaissance Squadron (Des Moines, Iowa) **
- 3rd Field Artillery Regiment (Fort Riley, Kansas) *
- 9th Engineer Squadron (Fort Riley, Kansas) *
- 2nd Medical Squadron (Kansas City, Kansas) **
- 17th Quartermaster Squadron (Fort Riley, Kansas) **

==== Reorganization 1941 ====
On 1 January 1941, the 3rd Field Artillery Regiment was reorganized and redesignated as the 3rd Field Artillery Battalion, while on 13 January 1941, the 16th Field Artillery Regiment was reorganized and redesignated as the 16th Field Artillery Battalion. On 8 May 1941, the 2nd Reconnaissance Squadron was redesignated the 92nd Reconnsaissance Squadron. The 9th Engineer Squadron became a motorized unit, and the 2nd Antitank Troop was added.

=== World War II ===
The surprise attack on Pearl Harbor triggered fears of assaults on the west coast and invasion threats from south of the border. A new emphasis was placed on the continent's western defenses and the division deployed its 3rd Brigade to Arizona. General Coulter, the brigade commander, was also given command of the Southern Land Frontier Sector of the Western Defense Command. Under him the 2nd Cavalry, stationed at Phoenix, and the 14th Cavalry, at Tucson, patrolled the Mexican Border for the next seven months. Meanwhile, the 4th Cavalry Brigade, still at Camp Funston, continued an endless cycle of training. Constantly called on to provide cadres for new units, the 9th and 10th Cavalry routinely lost veteran personnel and received untrained recruits.

==== Inactivation ====
During the spring of 1942 a War Department decision to increase the number of armored divisions in the United States Army resulted in the planned conversion of the 2nd Cavalry Division. White troops in the 3rd Brigade were used in the formation of the 9th Armored Division. The 2nd and 14th Cavalry were inactivated, and their personnel transferred into the newly formed 2nd and 14th Armored Regiments, both elements of the new armored division. On 15 July 1942 the 2nd Cavalry Division was inactivated. The 4th Cavalry Brigade, with its black regiments, however, remained active.

The activation of the 9th Armored Division created logistical problems at Fort Riley and Camp Funston. The installations that had accommodated a single division were now home to a division and an additional cavalry brigade. Consequently, the 4th Cavalry Brigade Headquarters and the 10th Cavalry relocated to Camp Lockett, California. The 9th Cavalry, although still assigned to the brigade, moved to Fort Clark, Texas.

==== Reactivation as a segregated unit ====
As the number of black personnel entering the Army rose, the need for segregated units for these soldiers to join also increased. In November 1942 the War Department directed that the 2nd Cavalry Division would be reactivated, and that two new black regiments would be assigned. It was also announced that the 2nd, now the Army's third black division, would remain divided between Texas and California. Construction was started at both posts since neither had the facilities to support an entire division. The work completed, the 2nd Cavalry Division was reactivated on 25 February 1943 with headquarters at Fort Clark. The 9th and 27th Cavalry, active at the Texas post, were the assigned troops of the 5th Cavalry Brigade, while the 10th Cavalry and the 28th Cavalry, located at Camp Lockett, made up the 4th Cavalry Brigade.

Filled using recruits straight from the induction centers, the 2nd Division spent most of the spring and summer of 1943 training its soldiers. The division provided these men with their basic training as well as instruction in cavalry operations. The division's training as a whole, however, would never end up be tested.

==== Deployment overseas and inactivation ====
Stating that there was no intrinsic need for a second cavalry division, the War Department had devised a plan to use the 2nd Cavalry Division's personnel to form needed service units. Black community leaders, rejecting the idea that black soldiers were not performing well in combat, were against the division being converted to a different mission. The debate over the capabilities of black units continued but the decision concerning the status of the 2nd Cavalry Division was already made. The War Department ordered the division to be shipped overseas where the conversion would take place. During January 1944 the 2nd Cavalry Division was dismounted and shipped back east for deployment abroad. Arriving at Oran, North Africa, on 9 March 1944, elements of the division were gradually inactivated until the 2nd Cavalry Division itself ceased to exist on 10 May 1944.

The division was never engaged in combat and was instead assigned to construct airfields for the Tuskegee Airmen in North Africa and perform garrison and supply duties there. The division also provided replacement troops for the all-black 92nd Infantry Division which was heavily engaged in combat in Italy.

==== Organization 1943–44 ====
2nd Cavalry Division 1943–1944 organization (click to enlarge)

Division headquarters reactivated on 25 February 1943 at Fort Clark. Mobilized for deployment to North Africa 12 January 1944. Inactivated in Oran, Algeria on 9 March 1944. Components used to create service and labor units.

- Headquarters and Headquarters Troop, 2nd Cavalry Division (Inactivated 10 May 1944)
- 4th Cavalry Brigade : Activated 21 February 1941. Inactivated 23 March 1944; assets converted into the 6495th Engineer Heavy Pontoon Battalion, Provisional (Colored); later converted into the 1553rd Engineer Heavy Pontoon Battalion (Colored).
  - 10th Cavalry Regiment : 24 March 1923 (Transferred to 3d Cavalry Division on 15 August 1927. Returned to 2d Cavalry Division on 10 October 1940. Inactivated 10 March 1944; assets converted into the 6486th Engineer Construction Battalion, Provisional (Colored) on 20 March 1944; later converted into the 1334th Engineer Construction Battalion (Colored) on 29 March 1944.
  - 28th Cavalry : Activated at Fort Lockett on 25 February 1943. Inactivated 31 March 1944; assets converted into the 6487th Engineer Construction Battalion, Provisional (Colored) on 31 March 1944; later converted into the 134th Quartermaster Battalion (Mobile) (Colored).
- 5th Cavalry Brigade : Activated 25 February 1943. Inactivated 12 June 1944; assets converted into the 6400th Ordnance Ammunition Battalion (Provisional) on 12 June 1944.
  - 9th Cavalry Regiment : Assigned 10 October 1940. Broken up and personnel reassigned to various service units on 7 March 1944.
  - 27th Cavalry Regiment : Activated 25 February 1943. Inactivated 27 March 1944; assets converted into the 6404th Port Battalion on 31 March 1944.
- 2nd Cavalry Division Artillery (Colored) Inactivated 10 March 1944.
  - 77th Field Artillery Battalion (Colored) (75mm) Inactivated 26 February 1944.
  - 79th Field Artillery Battalion (Colored) (75mm) Inactivated 10 March 1944.
  - 159th Field Artillery Battalion (105mm) (Colored): Did not deploy to North Africa.
- 35th Cavalry Reconnaissance Squadron (Mechanized) (Colored) (Inactivated 25 March 1944)
- 162nd Engineer Squadron (Colored) (Inactivated 22 March 1944)
- 3rd Medical Squadron (Colored) (Inactivated 24 May 1944)
- 2nd Cavalry Division Military Police Platoon (Colored) (Inactivated 1 June 1944)
- 20th Cavalry Quartermaster Squadron (Colored) (Inactivated 23 March 1944)
- 114th Ordnance Medium Maintenance Company (Colored) (Inactivated 7 March 1944)

=== Commanders ===
Those marked with an asterisk were designated the commanding officer for mobilization purposes.

- Colonel Bruce Palmer * - 1 October 1933–1 July 1935
- Colonel Charles F. Martin * - 1 July 1935–1 July 1936
- Colonel Albert E. Phillips * - 1 July 1936–1 July 1937
- No commander designated - 1 July 1937–1 April 1941
- Brigadier General Terry de la Mesa Allen - 1 April 1941–12 June 1941
- Major General John Millikin - 12 June 1941–July 1942
- Brigadier General John B. Coulter: May 1942 – 15 July 1942
- Major General Harry H. Johnson: 25 February 1943 – 10 May 1944.

== See also ==
- Buffalo Soldier
- List of armored and cavalry regiments of the United States Army
- United States Army branch insignia
