= Benjamin O. Davis Sr. =

United States Army general (1877-1970)

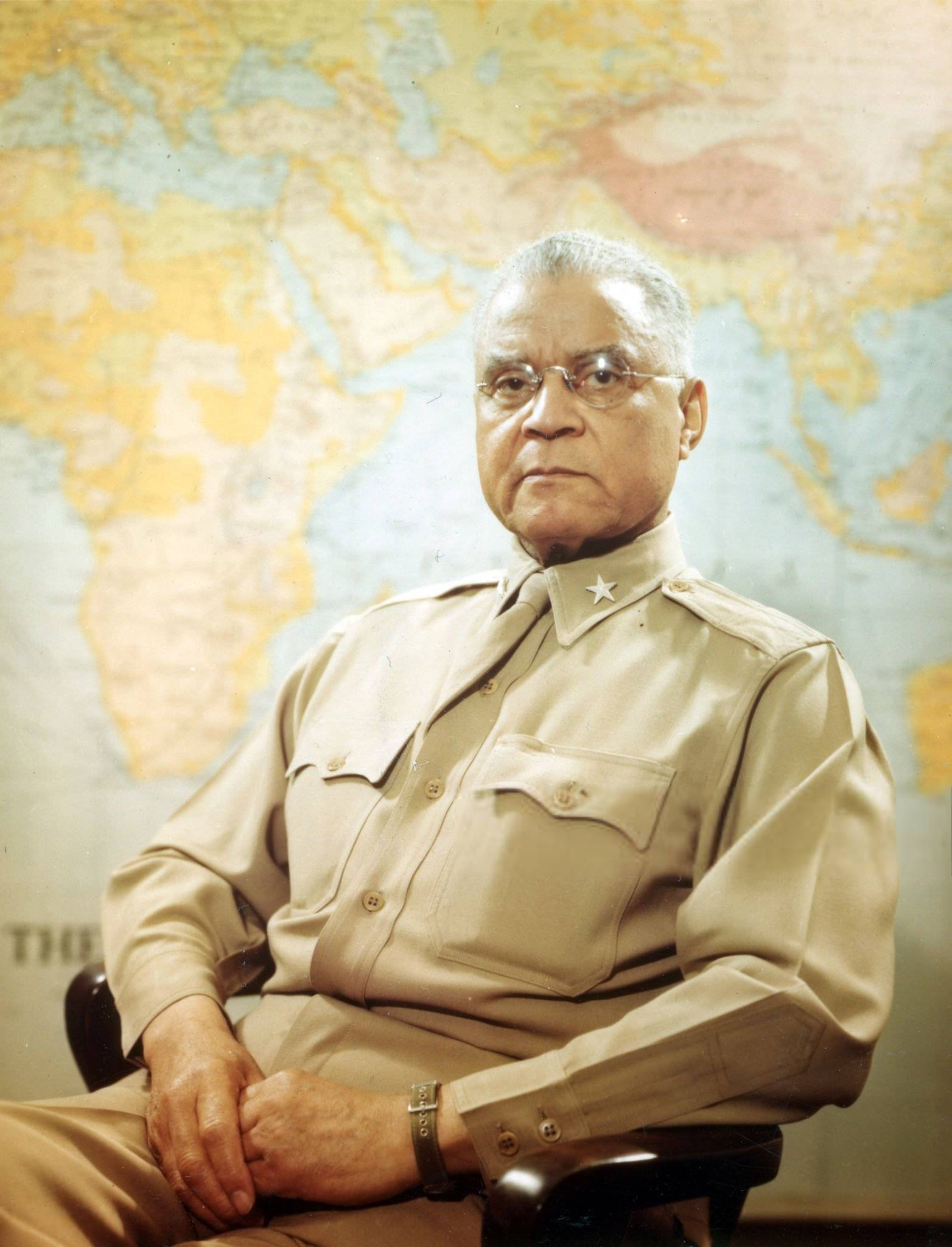
- U.S. Department of War portrait c. 1945
- Born: July 1, 1877; Washington, D.C., United States
- Died: November 26, 1970 (aged 93); Chicago, Illinois, United States
- Burial place: Arlington National Cemetery
- Education: Howard University (attended)
- Spouse(s): Elnora Dickerson Davis (m. 1902–1916, her death); Sarah "Sadie" Overton (m. 1919–1966, her death)
- Children: 3 (including Benjamin O. Davis Jr.)
- Military career
- Allegiance: United States
- Branch: District of Columbia National Guard; United States Army
- Service years: 1898 (National Guard); 1898–1948 (Army)
- Rank: Brigadier general
- Service number: O1217
- Unit: U.S. Army Cavalry Branch
- Commands: Troop B, 9th Cavalry Regiment; Supply Troop, 9th Cavalry Regiment; 3rd Squadron, 9th Cavalry Regiment; 1st Squadron, 9th Cavalry Regiment; Army Reserve Officers' Training Corps, Tuskegee Institute; Army Reserve Officers' Training Corps, Wilberforce University; 369th Infantry Regiment; 369th Anti-Aircraft Artillery Regiment; 4th Cavalry Brigade; 2nd Cavalry Division
- Conflicts: Spanish–American War; Philippine–American War; Mexican Border War; World War I World War II
- Awards: Army Distinguished Service Medal; Bronze Star Medal; Croix de Guerre (France); Order of the Star of Africa (Liberia)
- Other work: Member, American Battle Monuments Commission

Benjamin Oliver Davis Sr. (July 1, 1877 – November 26, 1970) was a career officer in the United States Army. One of the few black officers in an era when American society was largely segregated, in 1940 he was promoted to brigadier general, the army's first African American general officer.

A native of Washington, D.C., Davis attended M Street High School, where he obtained his first military experience by participating in the school's corps of cadets program. During his senior year, he also enrolled in courses at Howard University, which enabled him to play on the school's football team. After his 1898 graduation, Davis served briefly as a second lieutenant in the District of Columbia National Guard before joining the 8th U.S. Volunteer Infantry for the Spanish–American War and receiving his commission as a first lieutenant. After the war, Davis was discharged from the volunteers and joined the regular army as a private. He soon became a non-commissioned officer, and in 1901 passed the commissioning exam and received appointment as a second lieutenant of Cavalry.

Davis served in the Philippine–American War and World War I, in which he demonstrated noteworthy leadership and administrative ability, but found himself frequently shunted to less than desirable assignments as his career progressed. In addition to receiving less prestigious assignments such as professor of military science at historically black colleges because of segregation in the army, as one of only a handful of black officers he also experienced delays in promotions and disapproval of recommendations for professional education such as the United States Army Command and General Staff College. Despite these challenges, Davis worked within the army's white hierarchy to attain a record of superior technical and tactical proficiency as he slowly rose through the ranks. He was promoted to colonel in 1930, and commanded the New York National Guard's 369th Infantry Regiment (later the 369th Anti-Aircraft Artillery Regiment) from 1938 to 1940.

Though he was near retirement, political considerations during the 1940 United States presidential election, the need to obtain the support of black citizens for U.S. involvement in World War II and Davis's own long record of accomplishments led to his promotion to brigadier general. He commanded 4th Cavalry Brigade, 2nd Cavalry Division during its organization and training, and also served as acting division commander. He attained the mandatory retirement age of 64 in 1941, but remained on active duty to perform wartime inspections of black units and offer observations and recommendations on policies including racial integration.

Davis retired in 1948 and resided in Washington, D.C. He was a member of the American Battle Monuments Commission from 1953 to 1961. Davis later moved to Chicago to reside with one of his daughters. He died at Great Lakes Naval Hospital on November 26, 1970. Davis was buried at Arlington National Cemetery. Davis's children included Benjamin O. Davis Jr., the first black general in the United States Air Force.

== Early life and education ==
Davis said he was born in Washington, D.C., on July 1, 1877, the third child of Louis P. H. Davis and Henrietta (née Stewart) Davis. (Note: Biographer Marvin Fletcher proved Davis was born on May 28, 1880, citing the June 1880 U.S. Census, which indicated Davis was one month old. Davis apparently lied about his birthdate when he joined the army so that he would appear to meet the minimum enlistment age of 21. The birth date that appears on Davis's gravestone at Arlington National Cemetery is July 1, 1877, the date he provided to the Army.) Called "Ollie" as a boy, he was raised in the LeDroit Park neighborhood of Washington and attended the Lucretia Mott School.

Davis attended M Street High School in Washington, where he played baseball and football, and was captain of the football team. He also participated in the cadet program, in which city high schools organized military units that competed against each other in marksmanship, drill and ceremony, and other soldier skills. Davis attained the rank of captain as commander of Cadet Company B. (Note: Some later sources incorrectly indicate Davis was a cadet major, but contemporary sources all indicate that he was a cadet captain. The cadet major in command of his battalion was William O. Davis, which may be the source of the error.) During his senior year of high school he took courses at Howard University and played on the school's football team. His father, a messenger for the Interior Department, and his mother, a nurse, urged him to enroll in college after high school.

== Early career ==
While in high school, Davis received his commission as a second lieutenant in the District of Columbia National Guard's Company D, 1st Separate Battalion. After graduating from high school in 1898, Davis planned to enter full-time military service. He applied for admission to the United States Military Academy, and his father hoped the contacts he had made in his government position would enable him to secure an appointment through President William McKinley's administration, but the senior Davis was informed that appointing a black cadet was not feasible at that time.

In June 1898, Captain Jesse M. Lee of the 9th United States Volunteer Infantry Regiment, an African American unit raised for the Spanish–American War, recruited Davis and considered him for an officer's commission. Davis passed the required physical exam, but Lee withdrew his offer because of Davis's youth. He subsequently offered Davis a non-commissioned officer's appointment, which Davis rejected. Captain Robertson Palmer, a white officer in the African American 8th U.S. Volunteer Infantry, subsequently offered Davis a commission if Davis helped him recruit the sixty soldiers necessary to man the company Palmer was slated to command. Palmer and Davis quickly recruited their company, and on July 13, 1898, Davis was commissioned as a first lieutenant in the 8th U.S. Volunteer Infantry's Company G. He was soon appointed as his battalion's adjutant, in addition to duty as officer in charge of prisoners awaiting court-martial, and was stationed at Fort Thomas, Kentucky, and Chickamauga Park, Georgia, from October 1898 until the regiment was disbanded in March 1899.

Davis was mustered out of the United States Volunteers on March 6, 1899. His parents hoped he would attend college, but on June 18, 1899, he enlisted as a private in Troop I, 9th Cavalry Regiment. Assigned to Fort Duchesne, Utah, he served first as the troop's clerk and later as the 3rd Squadron's sergeant major. Davis later recounted that among his reading was Three Roads to a Commission in the U.S. Army by William P. Burnham, which included details on being commissioned from the ranks, so he continued to pursue his ambition of becoming a regular army officer. In late 1900, Davis's unit was commanded by Lieutenant Charles Young, one of a handful of African American officers serving in the U.S. military at that time. Young encouraged Davis and tutored him in the subjects covered on the officer candidate test, especially mathematics, which had been Young's weakest subject while a student at the United States Military Academy. In early 1901 Davis passed the physical exam and the battery of tests that were administered at Fort Leavenworth. (Note: Davis ranked third of the 12 soldiers in his testing group who received commissions, which included one other black candidate, John E. Green. Green retired as a lieutenant colonel in 1929.) On February 2, 1901, Davis was commissioned a second lieutenant of Cavalry.

In the spring of 1901, Troop I was posted overseas to serve in the Philippine–American War. In August 1901, Davis assumed officer's duties when he was assigned to Troop F, 10th Cavalry. Davis spent a year on the island of Panay as his new regiment fought Filipino insurgents. In September 1901, Troop F was split into separate detachments, with Davis being placed in charge of approximately 25 men who garrisoned the town of Lambunao. While in the Philippines, Davis demonstrated an innate ability to learn foreign languages by becoming fluent in both Spanish and the local Visayan language. (Note: Davis continued to study languages and became fluent in French and Italian.) He received an "excellent" rating on his first officer evaluation report, and his regimental commander, Colonel Samuel Whitside, later told Davis that several of the regiment's white officers thought so highly of him that they attempted to have him assigned to their units. While Davis was not known for developing personal or emotional bonds with his soldiers, they still regarded him highly, with most describing him as stern with respect to military discipline, but well liked.

Troop F returned to the U.S. in August 1902, and Davis was stationed at Fort Washakie, Wyoming, where he also served for several months with Troop M. He subsequently served as regimental adjutant and commander of several details that performed special duties, including ordnance, engineering, signal, and recruiting. Davis also led several hunting parties on which the garrison relied to supplement their food rations. In organizing hunting parties, Davis endeavored to ensure that each soldier got to participate at least once in order to train them on soldier skills including tracking and land navigation. As Davis's service in Wyoming continued, his additional duties included at different times post exchange officer, civilian education officer for enlisted men, and adjutant, quartermaster, and commissary of the Fort Washakie post. He consistently excelled in these assignments, with his efficiency reports routinely indicating his superior management and administrative abilities. Davis also participated in professional development activities including study of the Cavalry Drill Regulations and Small Arms Firing Regulations, in which he attained such a high level of proficiency during instruction that he was exempted from final testing.

== Continued career ==
Davis was promoted to first lieutenant on February 28, 1905. In April 1905, he was assigned to the 10th Cavalry Regiment at Fort Robinson, Nebraska. In September 1905, Davis was assigned as professor of military science and tactics at Wilberforce University, a traditionally black institution of higher learning. Davis disliked the assignment because Wilberforce was a Methodist institution, and he was not religious. When the school's president, Joshua H. Jones, questioned Davis's absence from church on the first Sunday after arriving at Wilberforce, Davis stated that he had no intention of attending. He also told Jones that if he was unhappy about Davis's decision, he should request Davis's reassignment, since Davis preferred to serve with his regiment.

Davis and Jones continued to quarrel, with Davis violating protocol through activities including keeping alcoholic beverages in his home, and Jones refusing to allow Davis to teach military science more than three hours per week. The dispute eventually reached the United States Department of War, where investigating officers concluded that Davis had legitimate complaints, but that many of the problems between the two men stemmed from Davis making "excessive demands" of Jones. Davis's additional duties while at Wilberforce including serving as the regular army inspector and evaluator of training for the District of Columbia National Guard's 1st Separate Battalion. Davis visited the battalion annually during its summer training period so he could provide instruction, supervise training, and inspect readiness. D.C. National Guard leaders appreciated Davis's attention and proficiency, and continued to solicit the War Department for his support. As a result, his assignment at Wilberforce and his additional duty with the 1st Separate Battalion were extended for a year after he had completed the usual three-year tour in 1908.

After completing his Wilberforce assignment, Davis served briefly with the 9th Cavalry until November 1909, when he was posted as U.S. military attaché in Liberia. Recommended for the post by U.S. ambassador Ernest A. Lyon, on whom Davis had previously made a favorable impression, in Liberia Davis was responsible for training Liberia's military forces as part of a larger U.S. effort to prevent invasion by the European powers during the period of African colonization. Davis's judgment was that Liberia's military was inept, and that it lacked a coherent command and control structure. Among the events he witnessed was a mutiny in which soldiers threatened Liberia's Secretary of War over nonpayment of wages. He also observed Liberia's military employ unconventional methods, including subduing a rebellious tribe by starving it into submission. Davis suggested reorganizing Liberia's military under an American cadre of two officers and three noncommissioned officers. The proposal was not accepted, but Liberia's government subsequently offered Davis an appointment in their military. Davis declined after obtaining a U.S. Department of War opinion that he could not constitutionally serve both countries.

The country's climate and the food and water that were then available in Liberia caused Davis to become ill, and in 1911 he requested reassignment. He returned to the United States in November 1911, and in January 1912 was assigned to Troop I, 9th Cavalry, stationed at Fort D.A. Russell, Wyoming. In 1913, the 9th Cavalry was assigned to patrol the Mexican-United States border between Hachita, New Mexico, and Nogales, Arizona, to prevent the cross-border raids that were taking place during the Mexican Revolution, and Davis was assigned to command the regiment's Troop B.

In February 1915, Davis was again assigned to Wilberforce University as professor of military science and tactics, and he was promoted to captain in December 1915. In early 1917, Davis requested reassignment to a troop unit, arguing that the circumstances at the college, chiefly friction between its president and him over issues including student discipline, left him unable to perform his duties effectively. The War Department reassigned Davis, but also made its displeasure with Wilberforce's president known by not assigning a replacement.

== Later career ==
In 1917, Davis was assigned to the 9th Cavalry at Fort Stotsenburg, Philippine Islands. As the army expanded for World War I, Davis was promoted to temporary major in 1917 and temporary lieutenant colonel in 1918. During this posting to the Philippines, Davis successively commanded the regiment's Supply Troop, served as post quartermaster, commanded 3rd Squadron and then 1st Squadron, and served as post provost marshal.

After returning to the United States in 1920, Davis returned to his permanent rank of captain, but was soon afterwards promoted to permanent lieutenant colonel. He was then assigned to the traditionally black Tuskegee Institute as professor of military science and tactics. Davis commanded the school's Army Reserve Officers' Training Corps program, and was responsible for providing instruction in basic infantry subjects while developing discipline in participants and increasing public awareness of the program. Davis received above-average annual evaluations while in this assignment, and after an inspection at Tuskegee, Fourth Corps Area commander David C. Shanks noted he was favorably impressed with both the ROTC program and Davis's leadership.

In 1924, Davis was posted to duty as senior instructor with 2nd Battalion, 372nd Infantry Regiment, an African American unit of the Ohio National Guard, in Cleveland, Ohio. As senior instructor, Davis supervised the development of plans for individual and collective training and oversaw the battalion's officers and noncommissioned officers as they provided instruction to the soldiers of their companies. In September 1929, Davis returned to Wilberforce University as professor of military science and tactics and commander of the school's ROTC program. In 1930, he was promoted to colonel. In 1931, Davis was again assigned to Tuskegee Institute as professor of military science and tactics and commander of the ROTC program. During the summer months of 1930 to 1933, Davis escorted pilgrimages of black World War I Gold Star mothers and widows to the burial places of their loved ones in Europe. His work on this effort was recognized with letters of commendation from the Secretary of War and the army's Quartermaster General.

In April 1938, Davis was assigned as senior instructor of the 369th Regiment a unit of the New York National Guard. Davis served in this assignment only briefly, because in May, Governor Herbert H. Lehman commissioned him as a colonel in the National Guard and appointed him to command the regiment. He took command in July, and led his all-black regiment during its individual and collective training, including annual summer encampments. While he was in command, the 369th Infantry was reorganized as the 369th Anti-Aircraft Artillery Regiment.

== General officer ==
With the U.S. military beginning to expand in expectation of entering World War II, several black leaders advocated for the increased enlistment of black soldiers as well as opportunities for commissions and leadership roles that had previously been denied to them. These advocates also pushed for Davis to be promoted to brigadier general. Army leaders did not include Davis on a list of colonels slated for promotion in late 1940, claiming that he was too close to the mandatory retirement age of 64. With President Franklin D. Roosevelt recognizing the need to attract black voters to his campaign for a third term, in late October he reconsidered the decision not to promote Davis and recommended him for advancement to brigadier general, with Roosevelt's staff making the claim that Davis had been inadvertently omitted from the original list. Davis was promoted on October 25, 1940, becoming the first African American general officer in the United States Army.

In January 1941, Davis became commanding general of 4th Cavalry Brigade, 2nd Cavalry Division at Fort Riley, Kansas. Davis oversaw the brigade's preparations for entry into the war, including individual and collective training, and non-commissioned and commissioned officer selection and education. He also served as acting division commander during the absence of his superior, Major General Terry de la Mesa Allen Sr. When Davis departed this assignment several months later, Allen attested to Davis's superior leadership when he reported to the War Department that 4th Brigade had made a slow start in getting organized and trained, but was finishing strong and would soon be prepared for combat.

In June 1941, General George C. Marshall, the army's chief of staff, inquired whether Davis was willing to continue serving beyond his mandatory retirement date in July. Marshall's plan was for Davis to serve as an assistant to the army's inspector general, with specific responsibility for identifying and resolving concerns arising from the expanded use of segregated black units. Davis accepted, retired on July 31, and was recalled to active duty on August 1. From 1941 to 1944, Davis conducted inspection tours of African American units throughout the army, including visits to the European theater of the war from September to November 1942 and July to November 1944. While serving in the Office of the Inspector General, Davis also served on the Advisory Committee on Negro Troop Policies, where he made recommendations on issues including how many black troops would be enlisted, how many would be trained as officers, and how black units would be employed. In mid-1943, he was assigned as military aide to both outgoing President Edwin Barclay and President-elect William Tubman during a Liberian state visit to the United States.

On November 10, 1944, Davis was reassigned as special assistant to Lieutenant General John C. H. Lee, commander of Communications Zone, European Theater of Operations. While serving in the European Theater of Operations, Davis continued his work to resolve issues related to the employment of black units, including advocating for the greater use of black soldiers as replacement troops for units in combat. After serving in the European Theater of Operations for more than a year, in November 1945 Davis returned to Washington, D.C. In February 1946, he was assigned as assistant to the army's inspector general. In July 1947, he was appointed United States special representative to Liberia's centennial celebration with the personal rank of ambassador. In October 1947, he was assigned as special assistant to the Secretary of the Army. In this posting, he was responsible for policy review and recommendations with respect to the role of African Americans in the army, including plans for desegregation.

== Retirement and death ==
On July 20, 1948, Davis retired in a White House ceremony presided over by President Harry S. Truman. On July 26, 1948, President Truman issued Executive Order 9981 which abolished racial discrimination in the United States armed forces. In retirement, Davis resided in Washington, D.C. From July 1953 to June 1961, he served as a member of the American Battle Monuments Commission. As a member of the commission, he made numerous trips around the United States and to Europe to commemorate veterans and dedicate monuments and memorials. His efforts were a significant part of planning, constructing, and dedicating six military cemeteries in Europe.

Davis later moved to Chicago, where he resided with his daughter Elnora. Davis died at Great Lakes Naval Hospital on November 26, 1970. He was buried at Arlington National Cemetery, Section 2, Grave E-478-B.

== Race relations and desegregation ==
Some historians, including Russell Weigley, regard Davis as a significant figure not for his personal accomplishments, since the army often relegated him to assignments considered less than prestigious, but because his prominence represented an indicator of forward movement for African Americans with respect to equality and desegregation.

Historian Jeffrey L. Jones assessed Davis's legacy with respect to race relations as an individual willing to accept a behind the scenes role that enabled him to indirectly advocate for greater equality in the military and society as a whole. Exploited by U.S. military and political leaders during World War II, Davis was aware of the political considerations that helped him ascend to the general officer ranks, but accepted the exploitation because he saw an opportunity to make progress in the country's treatment of black people. Once the war ended, Davis was no longer needed, so he was pushed into retirement.

Many of the changes Davis advocated during World War II were considered only temporary by army leaders, but were eventually codified after President Truman moved to desegregate the military. Davis's willingness to work within the white hierarchy that then controlled American life, and his subsequent non-participation in the civil rights movement of the 1950s and 1960s left him as a less prominent historical figure than he otherwise might have been, but the incremental progress he helped achieve left the army well-positioned for later progress.

== Legacy ==
In 1943, Davis was awarded the honorary degree of LL.D. from Atlanta University. The District of Columbia home in which Davis lived during his retirement, 1721 S Street NW, is part of Cultural Tourism DC's African American Heritage Trail.

In 1993, Davis was inducted into the Fort Leavenworth Hall of Fame. The hall was created in 1969 and recognizes outstanding soldiers who were stationed at Fort Leavenworth and contributed significantly to the army's history, heritage and traditions. In 1997, the U.S. Postal Service issued a 32-cent stamp honoring Davis.

In 2003, the Ohio Historical Society emplaced a marker at Wilberforce University to commemorate Davis's career. The plaque's front and back detail several of his accomplishments, including his service at Wilberforce, regimental command, and promotion to brigadier general.

Benjamin O. Davis Veterans of Foreign Wars Post 311 in Richton Park, Illinois, is named for both the senior and junior Davises.

Davis served at Fort D. A. Russell, Wyoming (now Francis E. Warren Air Force Base) early in his career. In 2022, the base's 90th Missile Wing dedicated the officer's housing in which Davis resided, Quarters 64, to Davis's memory and conducted a ceremony including the unveiling of a commemorative plaque.

== Personal life ==
Davis married Elnora Dickerson in 1902. Their daughter Olive was born in 1905, and was the wife of George W. Streator, the editor of The Pilot, the magazine of the National Maritime Union. A son, Benjamin O. Davis Jr., was born in 1912. In early 1916, a second daughter was born, but Elnora died a few days later from complications of childbirth; daughter Elnora was named for her. The younger Elnora Davis was the wife of James A. McClendon.

In 1919 Davis married Sarah "Sadie" Overton, an English professor at Wilberforce University. They were married until her death in 1966.

== Awards ==
Davis's military awards and decorations included:

Distinguished Service Medal
Bronze Star Medal	Spanish War Service Medal (Note: The Spanish War Service Medal recognized soldiers who performed homeland defense duties during the Spanish–American War. Davis was eligible as a result of his 1898 service with the 8th U.S. Volunteer Infantry.)	Philippine Campaign Medal (Note: The Philippine Campaign Medal was awarded to recognize service in the Philippine–American War between 1899 and 1913. Davis was eligible as a result of his Philippines service from 1901 to 1902.)
Mexican Border Service Medal (Note: The Mexican Border Service Medal was awarded for service on the U.S.-Mexico border during the period of the Mexican Revolution between 1910 and 1920. Davis was eligible as the result of his border service from 1913 to 1915.)	World War I Victory Medal (Note: The World War I Victory Medal was awarded for service between April 6, 1917 and November 11, 1918. Davis was eligible as the result of his wartime service in the Philippines.)	American Defense Service Medal (Note: The American Defense Service Medal recognized military members who served on active duty between September 8, 1939 and December 7, 1941. Davis was eligible as the result of his service commanding the 369th Infantry Regiment and 4th Brigade, 2nd Cavalry Division.)
American Campaign Medal (Note: The American Campaign Medal recognized military members who served in the American Theater of Operations during World War II. Davis was eligible because of his service as an assistant to the U.S. Army inspector general.)	European-African-Middle Eastern Campaign Medal (Note: The European–African–Middle Eastern Campaign Medal was awarded to service members who performed duty in the European Theater of World War II. Davis was eligible because of his service with the Communications Zone of the European Theater of Operations.)	World War II Victory Medal (Note: The World War II Victory Medal was awarded to members of the U.S. military who served between December 7, 1941 and December 31, 1946. Davis was eligible as the result of his active duty during the war.)
Army of Occupation Medal (Note: The Army of Occupation Medal recognized military members who performed post-World War II occupation duty in Germany, Italy, Austria, Japan or Korea. Davis was eligible as the result of his post-war service with the Communications Zone of the European Theater of Operations.)	Order of the Star of Africa (Commander) (Liberia)	Croix de Guerre with Palm (France)

=== Distinguished Service Medal citation ===
General Davis was awarded the Distinguished Service Medal (DSM) by General Order 10, dated February 22, 1945. The citation read:

For exceptionally meritorious service to the Government in a duty of great responsibility from June 1941, to November 1944, as an Inspector of troop units in the field, and as special War Department consultant on matters pertaining to Negro troops. The initiative, intelligence and sympathetic understanding displayed by him in conducting countless investigations concerning individual soldiers, troop units, and components of the War Department brought about a fair and equitable solution to many important problems which have since become the basis of far-reaching War Department policy. His wise advice and counsel have made a direct contribution to the maintenance of soldier morale and troop discipline and has been of material assistance to the War Department and to responsible commanders in the field of understanding personnel matters as they pertain to the individual soldier.

== Dates of rank ==
Davis's effective dates of rank were:

No pin insignia in 1898	Second Lieutenant, National Guard: April 11, 1898
	First Lieutenant, United States Volunteers: July 13, 1898
No insignia	Private, 9th Cavalry: June 14, 1899
	Corporal, 9th Cavalry: circa 1899
	Sergeant Major, 3rd Squadron, 9th Cavalry: circa 1900
No pin insignia in 1901	Second Lieutenant, Regular Army: February 2, 1901
	First Lieutenant, Regular Army: March 30, 1905
	Captain, Regular Army: December 24, 1915
	Major, National Army: August 5, 1917
	Lieutenant Colonel, National Army: May 1, 1918
	Captain, Regular Army: October 14, 1919
	Lieutenant Colonel, Regular Army: July 1, 1920
	Colonel, Regular Army: February 18, 1930
	Brigadier General, Army of the United States: October 25, 1940
	Brigadier General, Retired: July 31, 1941
	Brigadier General, Army of the United States: August 1, 1941
	Brigadier General, Retired: July 20, 1948

== Photo gallery ==
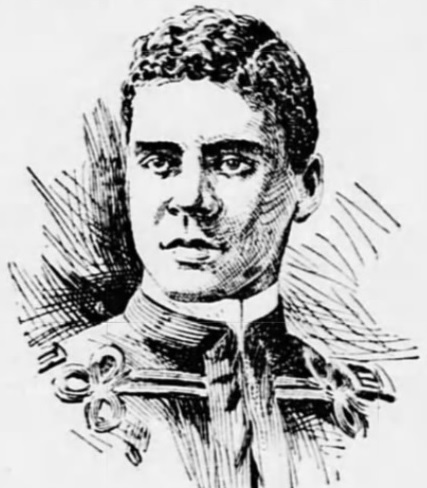
Davis in 1898 as commander of Washington, DC High School Cadet Company B

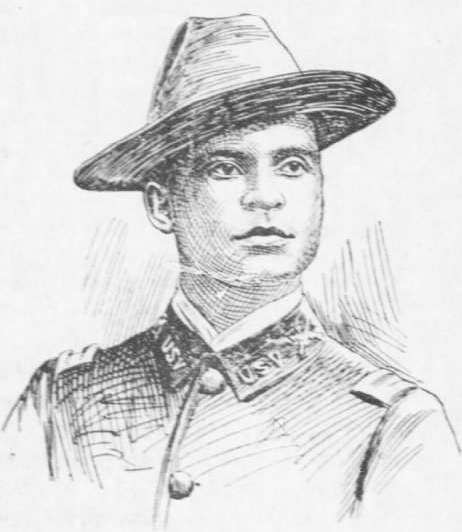
Davis as a second lieutenant of volunteers, 1899.

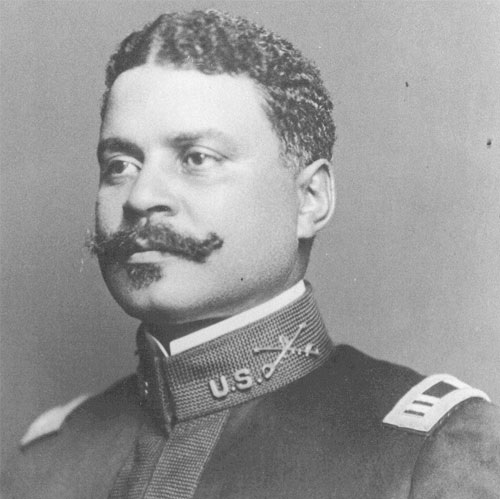
Davis as a captain in the 9th Cavalry, circa 1915

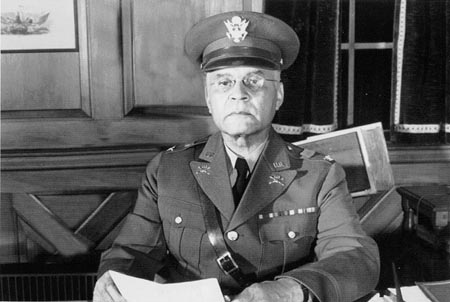
Davis as a colonel, circa 1939

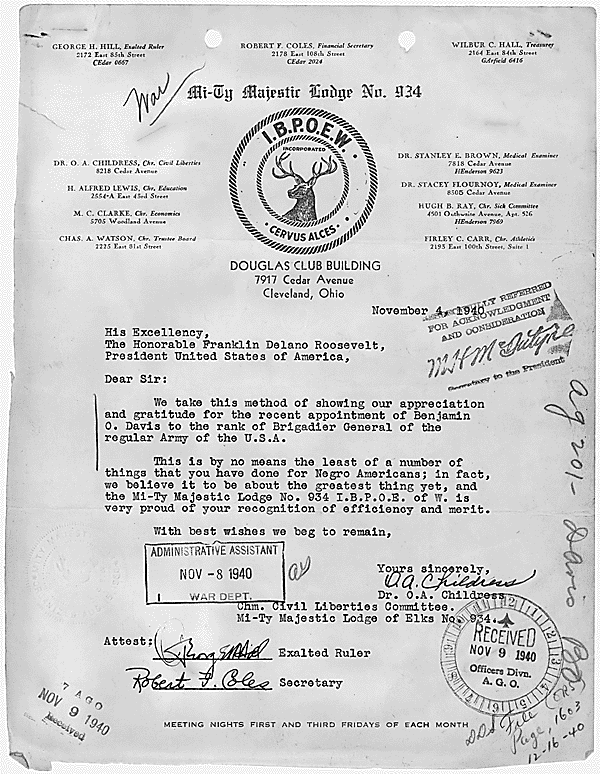
November 4, 1940 letter from Dr. O. A. Childress commending President Roosevelt's nomination of Benjamin O. Davis for brigadier general

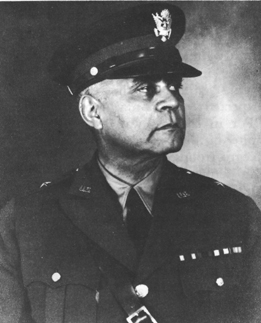
Davis soon after his October 1940 promotion to brigadier general

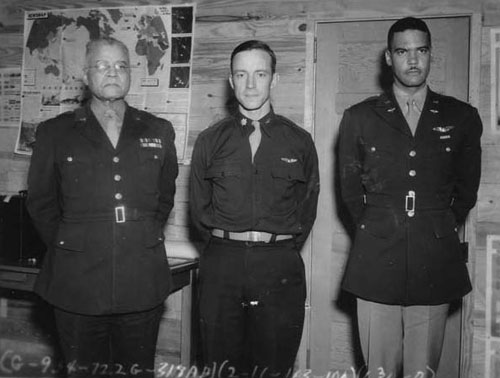
Davis Sr. (left), his son Benjamin O. Davis Jr. (right), and Noel F. Parrish during Davis Jr.'s organization and training of the Tuskegee Airmen

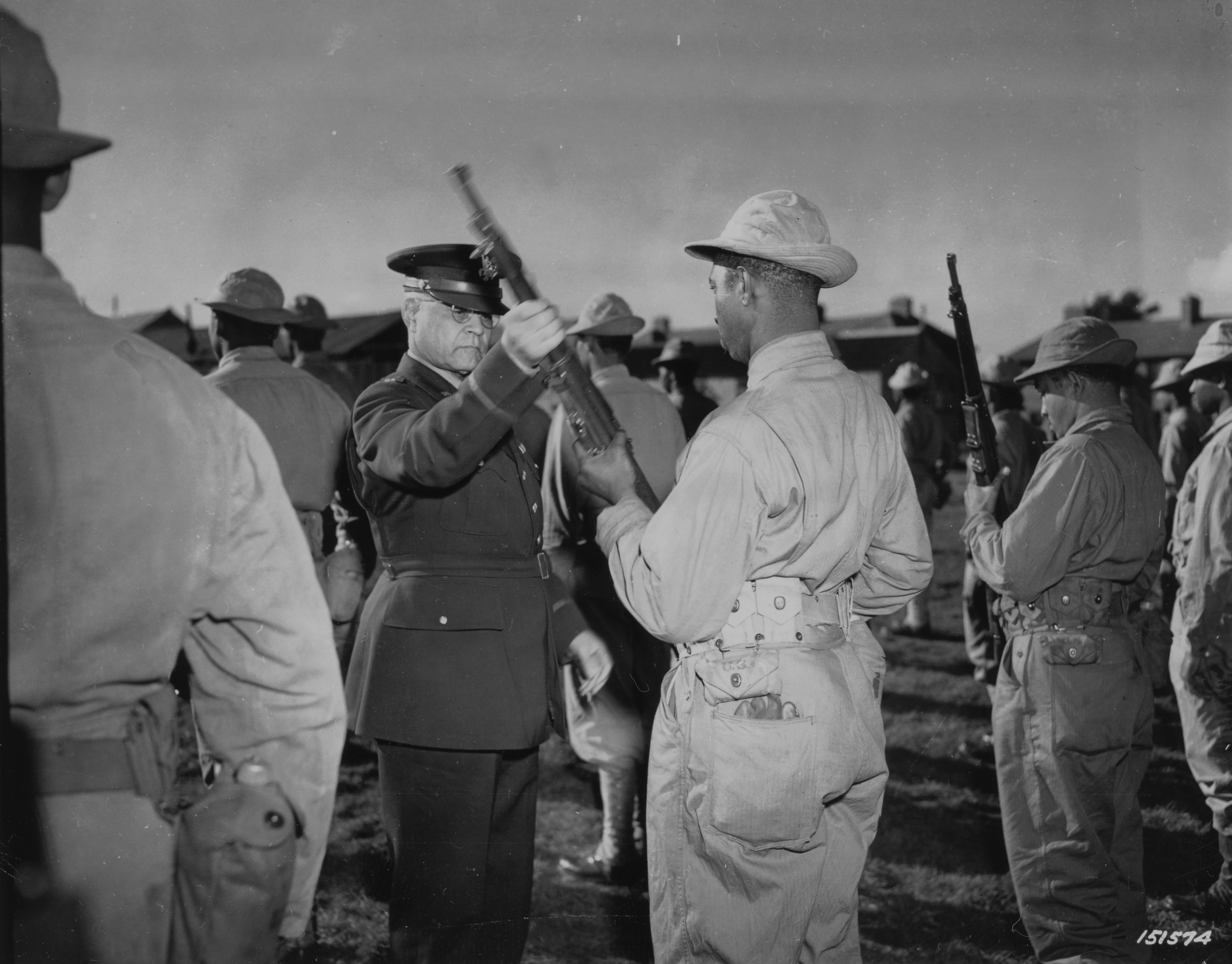
Davis inspects soldiers, Bristol, England, 1942

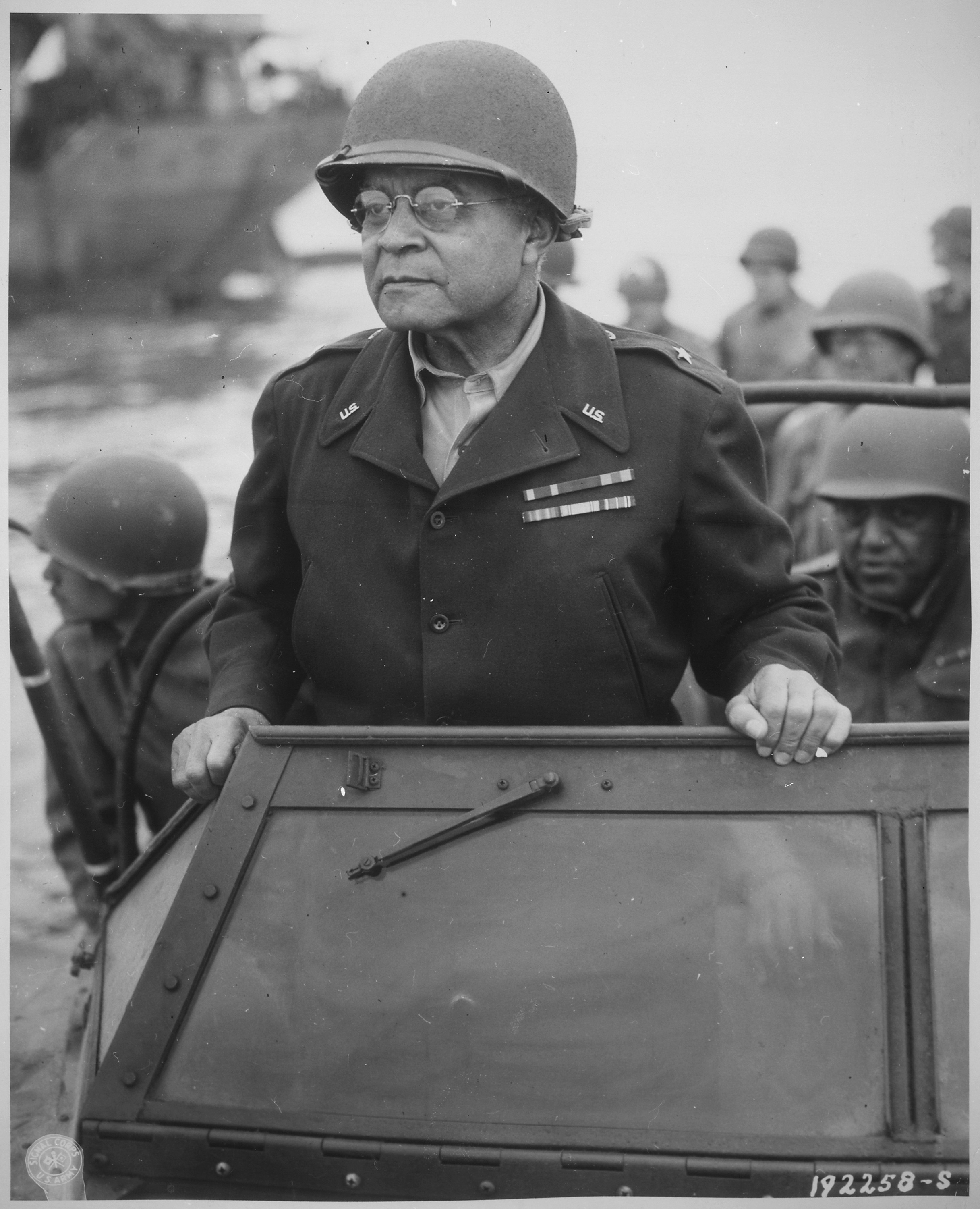
Davis in 1944 observing Signal Corps crew erecting communications poles in France

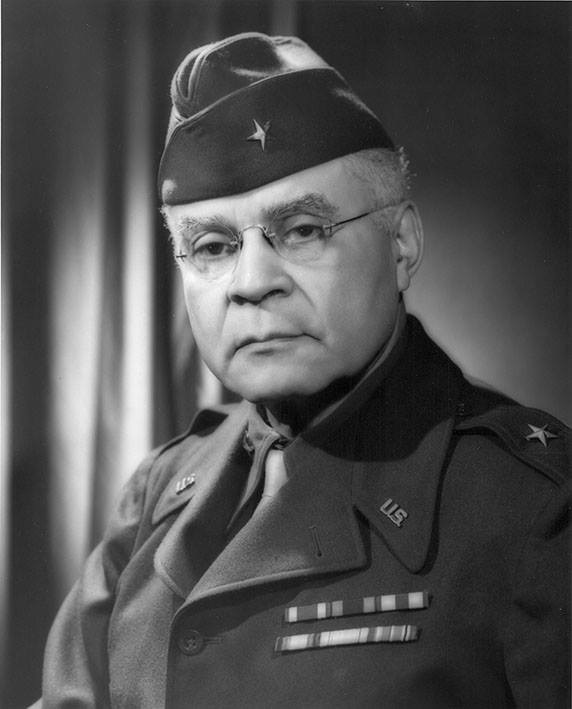
Official photographic portrait of Davis, circa 1945

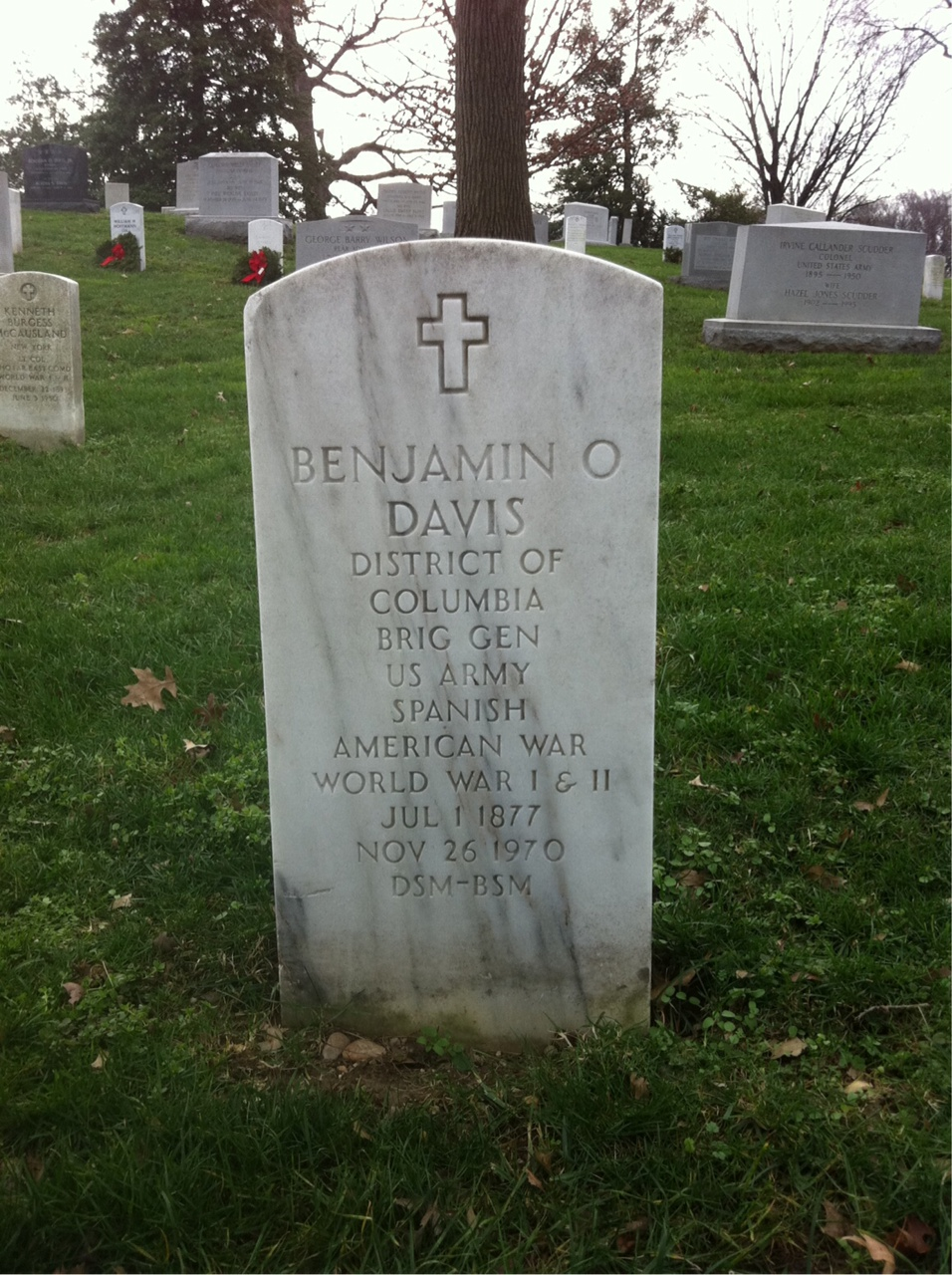
Davis's gravestone at Arlington National Cemetery

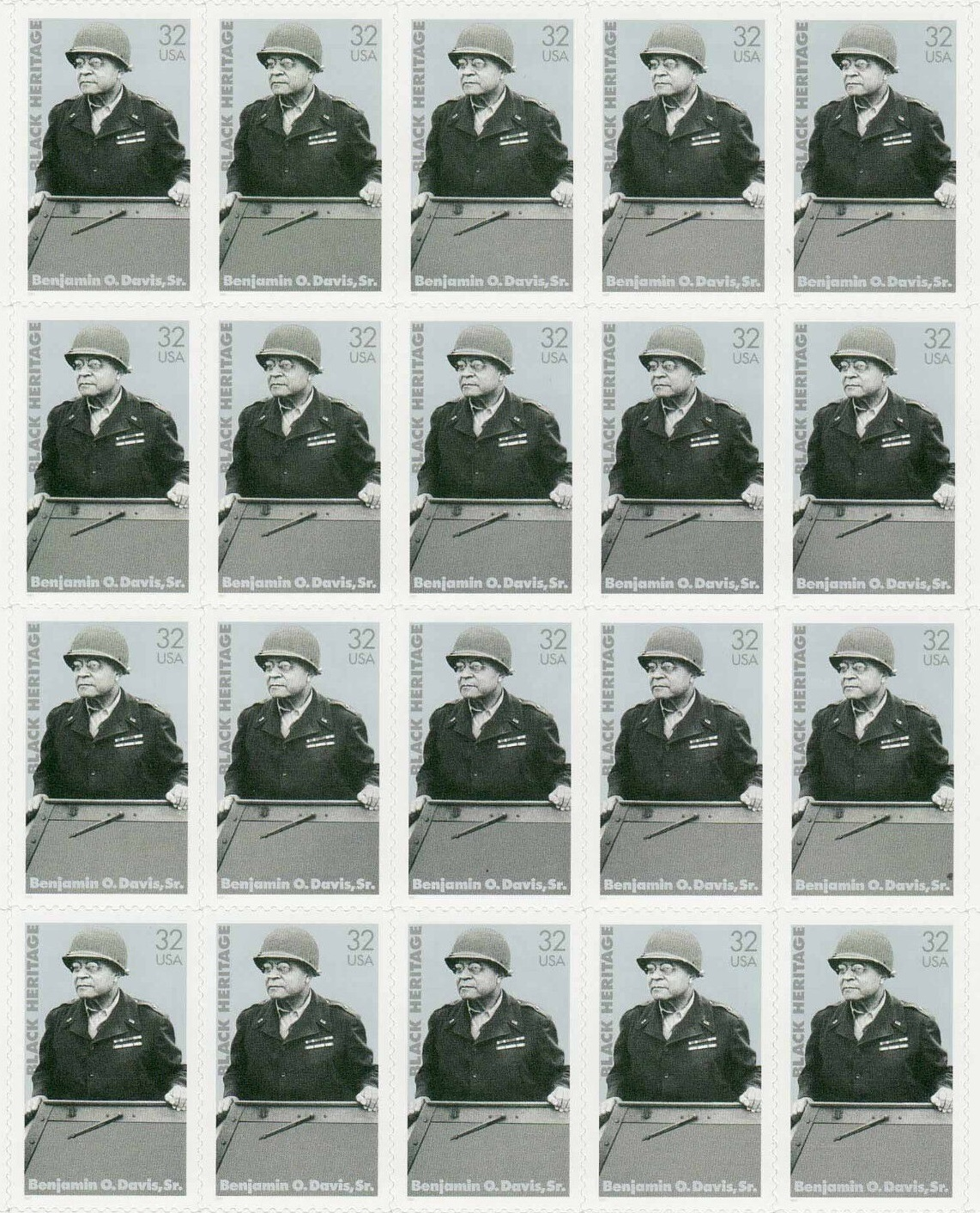
1997 32-cent postage stamp honoring Davis

== See also ==
- List of African American firsts
