= James R. Lockett =

United States Army officer (1835–1933)

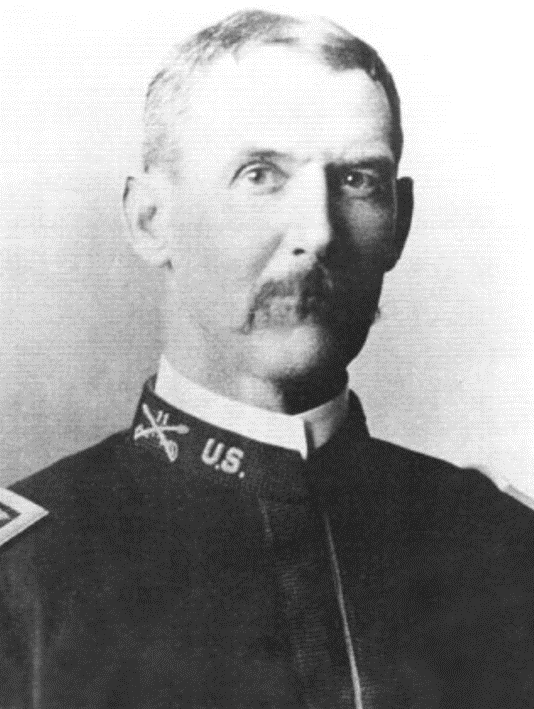
- Lockett in 1898
- Born: October 31, 1855; Culloden, Georgia, US
- Died: May 4, 1933 (aged 77); Coronado, California, US
- Burial place: Arlington National Cemetery
- Military career
- Allegiance: United States
- Branch: United States Army
- Service years: 1879–1919
- Rank: Colonel
- Conflicts: Spanish–American War; Philippine–American War; Pancho Villa Expedition; World War I
- Awards: Silver Star (2)

James Reuben Lockett (October 31, 1855 – May 4, 1933) was a decorated Colonel in the U.S. Army. He was awarded two Silver Stars for his actions in the Philippine Islands during the Spanish–American War. World War II Camp Lockett is named in his honor.

== Early life and education ==
Lockett attended the University of Georgia where he was a member of the class of 1874. He was a charter member of the Delta chapter of the Sigma Chi fraternity which received its charter at Georgia on November 8, 1872.

After graduating from Georgia, Lockett was appointed a cadet in the United States Military Academy on July 1, 1875 and was a member of the Academy's class of 1879.

== Military career ==
Lockett became a second lieutenant in the 4th U.S. Cavalry on June 13, 1879. He became first lieutenant on March 1, 1886, and captain on April 14, 1894. Lockett was named colonel of the 11th U.S. Volunteer Cavalryon August 10, 1899 until he was honorably mustered out of the volunteer service in 1901. Lockett was appointed major of the 4th U.S. Cavalry on January 30, 1903. Under the command of Lockett, his regiment was moved to Mexico on March 12, 1916, as part of the Pancho Villa Expedition. He would keep his regiment in Mexico until February 5, 1917.

== Honors ==
- Was awarded two Silver Stars for gallantry in action during the Philippine Insurrection.
- World War II Camp Lockett was named in his honor.
