= 28th Cavalry Regiment (United States) =

1943 US Army Cavalry Regiment

28th Cavalry Regiment (Horse) (Colored)
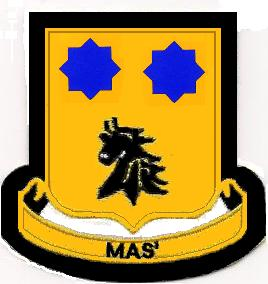
- Distinctive unit insignia
- Active: 1943–1944
- Country: United States
- Branch: Army
- Type: Cavalry
- Size: Regiment
- Garrison/HQ: Camp Lockett, California
- Colors: Yellow

The 28th Cavalry Regiment (Horse) (Colored) was a short-lived African American unit of the United States Army. The 28th Cavalry was the last horse-mounted cavalry regiment formed by the U.S. Army. The regiment was formed as part of the 2nd Cavalry Division in 1943 and inactivated in North Africa in 1944 without seeing combat.

== History ==
The regiment was constituted on 10 November 1942 and activated at Camp Lockett, California on 25 February 1943, assigned to the 4th Cavalry Brigade of the 2nd Division. The horses for the new regiment were chosen from Fort Bliss and the United States Army Remount Service at Fort Robinson. The Brigade, which the 28th was part of, relieved the 11th Cavalry Regiment from its border defense mission at Camp Lockett. The regiment was commanded by Colonel Edwin M. Burnett and conducted training in southern California while patrolling the Mexico–United States border. The 28th's enlisted men were all African American, and its 153-man cadre of non-commissioned officers were from the 10th Cavalry. The remainder of the enlisted men were draftees. The regiment was called upon to fight wildfires during the summer of 1943. The largest of these fires was the 16,000-acre Barrett-Cottonwood-Morena Fire. The 28th Cavalry personnel serving within the Cleveland National Forest were praised for their firefighting efforts by the Forest's supervisor. Even with this break in training the regiment proved ready to advance its combat training. In late 1943, the regiment was expected to move on to Desert Training Center, however Army Ground Forces decided that training in Louisiana would be preferential for horse cavalry maneuver.

In December, the Department of War decided to send the division to North Africa, where it would be broken up into service units, which were needed more than cavalry. Around 12 January 1944, the regiment was alerted for movement and dismounted. It was moved by train to Camp Patrick Henry, Virginia, between 10 and 15 February, being brought up to strength by 243 replacements from Fort Huachuca. On 2 March, the regiment moved to Newport News from the camp.

The regiment shipped out on 3 March 1944 from the Hampton Roads Port of Embarkation aboard the USS General William Mitchell. After arriving at Casablanca on 12 March, the regiment staged at Camp Don B. Passage near the city before departing for Oran by train. A little over two weeks after arrival in Algeria, on 31 March, the 2nd Cavalry Division and its component regiments were inactivated at Hassi Ben Okba near Oran. Troops from the 28th Cavalry were given the option of transferring to service units or volunteering for combat but at the loss of all rank. Some troops from the 28th Cavalry were used to activate the 6487th Engineer Battalion. The regiment was formally disbanded on 12 December 1951.

== Sources ==
- Sawicki, James A. (1985). Cavalry regiments of the US Army. Dumfries, Virginia: Wyvern Publications. ISBN 9780960240463.
- Stanton, Shelby L. (1984). Order of Battle: U.S. Army, World War II. Novato, California: Presidio Press. ISBN 9780891411956. "815th tank destroyer."
- Vezina, Meredith (Spring 1993). "Defending The Border". Journal of San Diego History. 39 (1).
