= Fort Logan H. Roots =

Historic site in North Little Rock, Arkansas

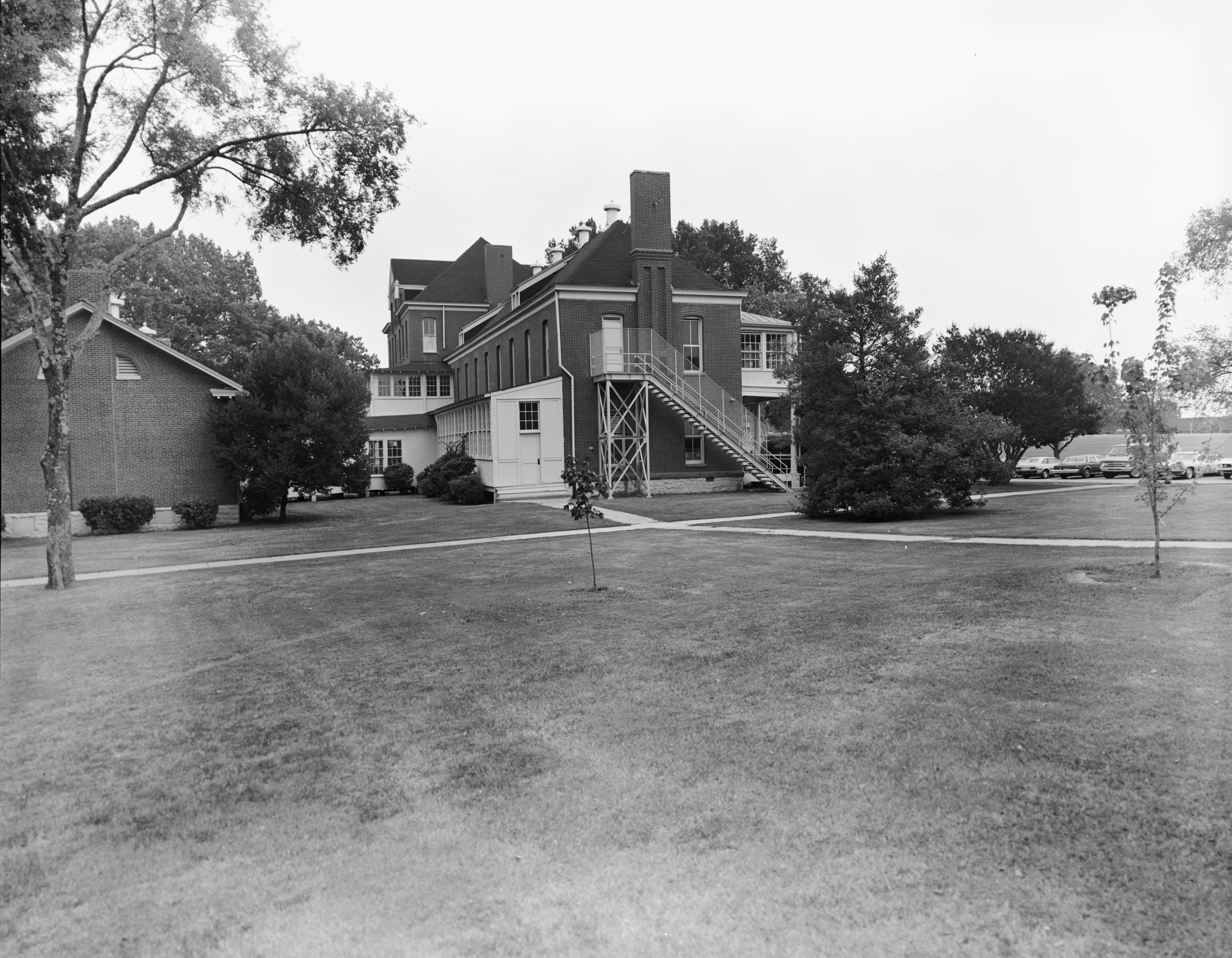
- Building No. 1 at Fort Logan H. Roots

- Location within Arkansas
- 34°46′30″N 92°17′45″W
- Location: North Little Rock, Arkansas

History
- Built: December 3, 1894

Site notes
- Area: less than 100 acres (40 ha)
- Architect: Frederick Kepler
- Architectural styles: Greek Revival; Romanesque
- Current use: Veterans' hospital
- Governing body: U.S. Department of Veterans Affairs

U.S. National Register of Historic Places
- Official name: Fort Logan H. Roots Military Post
- Type: U.S. historic district
- Designated: September 4, 1974
- Reference no.: 74000498

Fort Logan H. Roots, commonly known as Fort Roots, is a former U.S. Army post in North Little Rock, Arkansas. It was named in honor of Brevet Lieutenant Colonel Logan H. Roots, U.S. Volunteers, who served with distinction in the Western Theater of the American Civil War. It was established in 1892 and garrisoned from 1896 to 1913. After World War I, the post was transferred to the Public Health Service for use as a hospital, and in 1921, an Act of Congress authorized the establishment of a hospital for veterans.

It is home to the VA's Eugene J. Towbin Healthcare Center and the Law Enforcement Training Center.

== History ==
In 1892, about 1,049 acres was traded to the U.S. government in exchange for the area now known as MacArthur Park Historic District in Little Rock, which had been a military reservation since the 1830s. During World War I, the post served as an officers' training camp.

The 66th U.S. Congress transferred Fort Roots to the Public Health Service department on March 4, 1921, for conversion to a veterans hospital for neuropsychiatric disorders. On June 10, 1983, a newly constructed hospital building was dedicated on the existing property. The main hospital building was formally named the Eugene J. Towbin Healthcare Center in May 1996 in honor of Eugene J. Towbin in recognition of his 40-year career at the veterans medical center. The Center provides long-term, rehabilitative care for eligible veterans.

Although four of the existing hospital structures were demolished, Fort Roots (as the VA campus is still known) retained many of its original military buildings and an 11-acre (4.5 ha) "parade ground" in the center of the original post. Many of the historic buildings flanking the parade ground were listed in the National Register of Historic Places in 1974 in recognition of the area's military history, and virtually the entire campus was listed in 2013 in recognition of its significance as a U.S. Veterans Administration medical center.

== See also ==
- List of former United States Army installations
- List of Veterans Affairs medical facilities by state
- National Register of Historic Places listings in Pulaski County, Arkansas
