= San Carlos War Dog Training Center =

US WWII canine training site in California

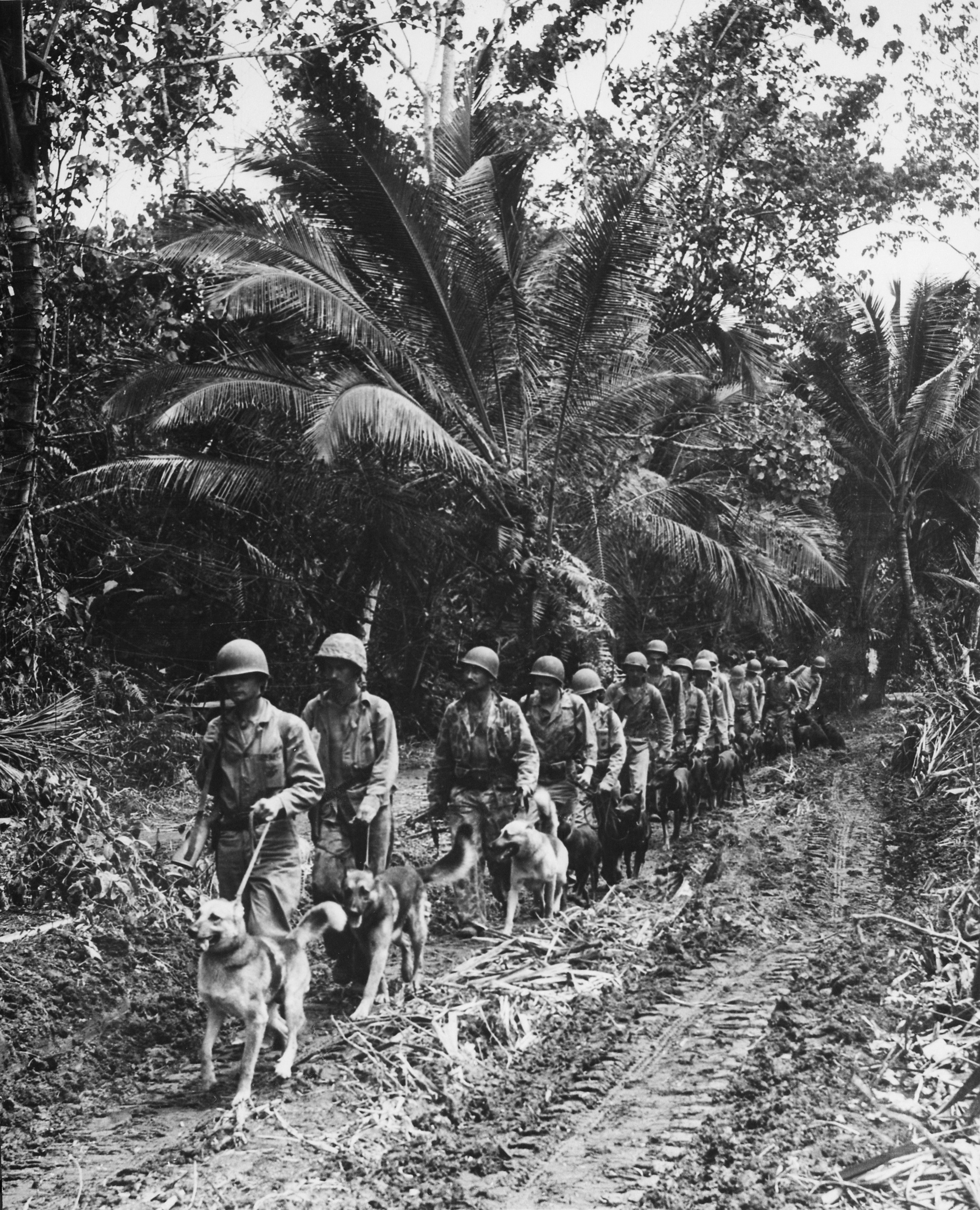
- Marine Raiders take US Army scouting and messenger dogs to the frontlines on Bougainville, late 1943

- Location within California
- 37°29′44″N 122°16′00″W
- Location: San Carlos, California

History
- Built: 1942 (closed 1944)

Site notes
- Area: 177 acres (72 ha)
- Architect: US Army

The San Carlos War Dog Training Center also called the Western Remount Area Reception and Training Center was located at San Carlos, California. Then was built at the old H & H Ranch. The US Army opened the 177 acre center on October 15, 1942. The center was used to train US Army dogs. The US Army ended the land lease on November 1, 1944. The land was built in to family homes in the 1950s. San Carlos War Dog Training Center was one of five US Army dog training centers. The center was operated by the US Army Quartermaster Corps. Trained dogs were an important part of the World War II efforts. German Shepherds, Belgian Sheep dogs, Doberman Pinschers, farm Collies and Giant Schnauzers were trained at the center. At the center dogs were trained to be guards, scouts, messengers, mine detectors, sled and pack dogs. The training took 8 to 11 weeks, the dogs and the trainers were housed at the center. Training was at first basic dog training, then advanced to dog being at easy with gunfire, riding in military vehicles and wearing gas masks. At is peak there were 550 troops, 15 civilian contractors and up to 1,200 dogs at the center. By the end of the war 4,500 dogs and 2,500 men were trained at the center.

== See also ==
- Dogs in warfare
- Ancient warfare
- Animals in War Memorial, London
- Dickin Medal, UK honour awarded to animals "for gallantry"
- Dogs of Roman Britain
- Examples of dogs that gained notability in war
- List of Labrador Retrievers
- List of individual dogs
- National War Dog Cemetery, Guam
- Police dog
