= James A. McClendon =

Illinois politician

James A. McClendon (May 7, 1906 – July 31, 1992) was a lawyer, judge, and Army officer who served in the Illinois House of Representatives. He was a Democrat.

He served in the U. S. Army. He served as a Master in Chancery. He lived in Chicago.

He was born in Washington, Georgia. He graduated from Fisk University and graduated with a law degree from Northwestern University. He was first elected to the Illinois House in 1966 and served there until 1978 when he was elected to the Illinois Senate. His wife Elnora was the daughter of Brigadier General Benjamin O. Davis Sr. He died in Santa Monica, California.
