= 4th Cavalry Brigade (United States) =

- First Army shoulder sleeve insignia
- Active: 1915–1944; 2006–present
- Country: United States
- Branch: U.S. Army
- Role: Training
- Size: Brigade
- Part of: 85th Support Command
- Garrison/HQ: Fort Knox
- Motto: Train for Combat!
- Decorations: Superior Unit Award

Commanders
- Notable commanders: Benjamin O. Davis Sr. Harry Chamberlin

Insignia
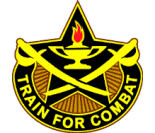
- Distinctive Unit Insignia

The 4th Cavalry Brigade is an AC/RC unit based at Fort Knox, Kentucky. The unit is responsible for training selected United States Army Reserve & National Guard units that are based East of the Mississippi River. The brigade was originally formed as an element of the 2nd Cavalry Division but was inactivated after the division was broken up. The unit was formerly designated as 4th Brigade, 85th Division. The brigade is a subordinate unit of the 1st Army.

== Organization ==
=== World War II ===
- Headquarters and Headquarters Troop, 4th Cavalry Brigade
- 9th Cavalry Regiment (Cld)
  - 10th Cavalry Regiment (Cld)
  - 28th Cavalry Regiment (Cld)

=== Organization 2026 ===
The 4th Cavalry Brigade is a Multi-Functional Training Brigade (MFTB) assigned to the 85th Support Command. Like all formations of the 85th Support Command, the brigade is not a combat formation, but instead trains Army Reserve and Army National Guard units preparing for deployment. As of January 2026, the brigade consists of a Headquarters and Headquarters Company, five active duty battalions, and five reserve battalions.

- 4th Cavalry Brigade, at Fort Knox (KY)
  - Headquarters and Headquarters Company, at Fort Knox (KY)
  - 1st Battalion, 311th Regiment (Training Support), in Richmond (VA)
  - 3rd Battalion, 337th Regiment (Training Support), at Fort Knox (KY)
  - 2nd Battalion, 340th Regiment (Training Support), in Louisville (KY)
  - 3rd Battalion, 383rd Regiment (Training Support), at Jefferson Barracks Military Post (MO)
  - 1st Battalion, 409th Regiment (Brigade Engineer Battalion), at Fort Knox (KY)
  - 3rd Battalion, 409th Regiment (Brigade Support Battalion), at Joint Base Charleston (SC)
  - 4th Battalion, 409th Regiment (Brigade Support Battalion), at Fort Knox (KY)
  - 1st Battalion, 410th Regiment (Brigade Engineer Battalion), at Fort Knox (KY)
  - 4th Battalion, 410th Regiment (Brigade Support Battalion), at Fort Knox (KY)
  - 1st Battalion, 411th Regiment (Logistical Support), at Fort Knox (KY)

The brigade's four training support battalions and logistical support battalion are Army Reserve formations.

== Lineage ==
Constituted 25 August 1942 in the Army of the United States as Headquarters, 4th Tank Destroyer Group

Activated 1 September 1942 at Camp Hood, Texas

Inactivated 26 October 1945 at Fort Jackson, South Carolina

Disbanded 5 August 1952

Reconstituted 24 October 1997 in the Regular Army as Headquarters, 4th Cavalry Brigade, and activated at Fort Knox, Kentucky

Inactivated 16 October 1999 at Fort Knox, Kentucky

Activated 1 December 2006 at Fort Knox, Kentucky

== Unit decorations ==
Ribbon	Award	Year	Orders
	Army Superior Unit Award	2008-2011	Permanent Orders 332-07 announcing award of the Army Superior Unit award

== Campaign participation credit ==
Conflict	Streamer	Year(s)
World War II	Normandy	1944
World War II	Northern France	1944
World War II	Rhineland	1945
World War II	Ardennes-Alsace Campaign	1944–1945
World War II	Central Europe	1945
