= Camp Millard =

- Crawford County, Ohio

Site information
- Type: Training facility

Location
- Coordinates: 40°48′6″N 82°57′18″W

Site history
- Built: 1942
- In use: 1942 - 1946

Garrison information
- Garrison: 753rd Railway Shop Battalion

Camp Millard was a United States Army facility in Crawford County, Ohio. It was established on the Crawford County Fairgrounds in 1942. After the end of World War II, the land and buildings were returned to the county. During the war, the 753rd Railway Shop Battalion was stationed at Camp Millard.
