= Camp Lawrence J. Hearn =

Former U.S. Army facility in San Diego, California

Coordinates: 32.5844°N 117.090°W

- Part of Southern California Border District
- Palm City, San Diego

Site information
- Controlled by: United States Army

Site history
- In use: 1916–1931

Garrison information
- Garrison: 11th Cavalry

Camp Lawrence J. Hearn was a United States Army facility formerly located in Palm City, San Diego, California. The Third Oregon Infantry established the camp in 1916 during its border service; it was abandoned in 1931 by the 11th Cavalry Regiment when the regiment moved to the Presidio of Monterey.

== History ==
Beginning in 1916, the Third Oregon Infantry established the post during its border service. The United States Army maintained Camp Lawrence J. Hearn in honor of Major Hearn of the 21st Infantry Regiment in order to patrol the border during the Mexican Civil War. It was manned by the 1st Cavalry Regiment. It was abandoned in August 1920 but re-established by the 11th Cavalry Regiment in October of that same year. Brigadier General F.C. Marshall visited the post just before he died in a plane crash while traveling to Tucson, Arizona. Until 1921 the post consisted of a tent cantonment with no permanent structures and soldiers requiring medical care would be sent to Fort Rosecrans for treatment. Conditions on the post did not improve significantly. Army Chief of Staff Major General Summerall described them as being like a "logging camp" composed of "tumbledown shacks". In 1924, cavalrymen from the post assisted local officers and federal agents in enforcing a 9 pm curfew at the international border crossing. It continued to be in use until it was abandoned in 1931. Later the Coastal Artillery Corps considered the former post as the site of a future battery. This, however, was never built.
