= List of ship launches in 1952 =

The list of ship launches in 1952 includes a chronological list of all ships launched in 1952.

Date	Ship	Class / type	Builder	Location	Country	Notes
16 January	British Skill	Tanker	Harland & Wolff	Belfast	United Kingdom	For British Tanker Company.
26 January	Mitscher	Mitscher-class destroyer	Bath Iron Works	Bath, Maine	United States	First in class
26 January	Willis A. Lee	Mitscher-class destroyer	Fore River Shipyard	Quincy, Massachusetts	United States	
29 January	Onitsha	Cargo ship	Harland & Wolff	Belfast	United Kingdom	For Elder Dempster.
30 January	Manchester Pioneer	Cargo ship	Cammell Laird	Birkenhead	United Kingdom	
30 January	Manchester Spinner	Cargo ship	Cammell Laird	Birkenhead	United Kingdom	
14 February	King Alexander	Cargo ship	Harland & Wolff	Belfast	United Kingdom	For King Line.
15 February	Acacia	Type MSC60 draguer de mines	Frank L. Sample Jr.	Boothbay Harbor, Maine	United States	For: French Navy
February	Manchester Explorer	Cargo ship	Cammell Laird	Birkenhead	United Kingdom	
February	S.BX.M. 1	Deck barge	Alabama Drydock and Shipbuilding Company	Mobile, Alabama	United States	For Surina Bamache Bauxite.
February	S.BX.M. 2	Deck barge	Alabama Drydock and Shipbuilding Company	Mobile, Alabama	United States	For Surina Bamache Bauxite.
February	S.BX.M. 3	Deck barge	Alabama Drydock and Shipbuilding Company	Mobile, Alabama	United States	For Surina Bamache Bauxite.
February	S.BX.M. 4	Deck barge	Alabama Drydock and Shipbuilding Company	Mobile, Alabama	United States	For Surina Bamache Bauxite.
15 March	Equator	Cargo ship	Wärtsilä Crichton-Vulcan	Turku	Finland	Originally for Finland – South-American Line; handed over to Sudoimport as m/s Archangelsk.
25 March	Essequibo	Cargo ship	Harland & Wolff	Belfast	United Kingdom	For Royal Mail Line.
25 March	Janita	Tanker	Harland & Wolff	Belfast	United Kingdom	For Spermacet Whaling Co.
5 April	Braemar Castle	Passenger ship	Harland & Wolff	Belfast	United Kingdom	For Union-Castle Line.
23 April	Wilkinson	Mitscher-class destroyer	Fore River Shipyard	Quincy, Massachusetts	United States	
26 April	Calédonien	Ocean liner	A&C de France	Dunkerque	France	For Messageries Maritimes
1 May	Voyager	Daring-class destroyer	Cockatoo Island Dockyard	Sydney, New South Wales	Australia	
8 May	Diana	Daring-class destroyer	Yarrow Shipbuilders	Glasgow, Scotland	United Kingdom	
8 May	Irish Coast	Ferry	Harland & Wolff	Belfast	United Kingdom	For Coast Lines.
8 May	Isaac Carter	Cargo ship	Blyth Dry Docks & Shipbuilding Co. Ltd	Blyth, Northumberland	United Kingdom	For Barberry Steamship Co. Ltd.
22 May	Cedric	Refrigerated cargo ship	Harland & Wolff	Belfast	United Kingdom	For Shaw Savill Line.
May	I.W.C. 150	Hopper barge	Alabama Drydock and Shipbuilding Company	Mobile, Alabama	United States	For Inland Waterways Commission.
May	I.W.C. 151	Hopper barge	Alabama Drydock and Shipbuilding Company	Mobile, Alabama	United States	For Inland Waterways Commission.
May	I.W.C. 152	Hopper barge	Alabama Drydock and Shipbuilding Company	Mobile, Alabama	United States	For Inland Waterways Commission.
10 June	Busen 5	Whaler	Harland & Wolff	Belfast	United Kingdom	For Tongsberg A/S.
12 June	Blunham	Ham-class minesweeper	Brooke Marine Ltd.	Lowestoft	United Kingdom	For Royal Navy.
24 June	Obuasi	Cargo ship	Harland & Wolff	Belfast	United Kingdom	For Elder Dempster.
June	Humble 120	Tank barge	Alabama Drydock and Shipbuilding Company	Mobile, Alabama	United States	For Humble Oil Company.
June	I.W.C. 154	Hopper barge	Alabama Drydock and Shipbuilding Company	Mobile, Alabama	United States	For Inland Waterways Commission.
June	I.W.C. 155	Hopper barge	Alabama Drydock and Shipbuilding Company	Mobile, Alabama	United States	For Inland Waterways Commission.
8 July	Janova	Tanker	Harland & Wolff	Belfast	United Kingdom	For Spermacet Whaling Co.
12 July	John S. McCain	Mitscher-class destroyer	Bath Iron Works	Bath, Maine	United States	
12 July	Illusive	Aggressive-class minesweeper	Martinolich Ship Building Co	San Diego, California	United States	
12 July	Jean Labord	cruise ship	Forges & Chantiers de la Gironde	Bordeaux	France	For Messageries Maritimes
16 July	Nyon	Cargo ship	C Van der Giessen & Zoon	Krimpen aan den IJssel	Netherlands	For Suisse-Atlantique Societé de Navigation Maritime SA
22 July	Africa Palm	Cargo ship	Short Brothers of Sunderland	Sunderland	United Kingdom	For Palm Line
July	I.W.C. 137	Hopper barge	Alabama Drydock and Shipbuilding Company	Mobile, Alabama	United States	For Inland Waterways Commission.
July	I.W.C. 138	Hopper barge	Alabama Drydock and Shipbuilding Company	Mobile, Alabama	United States	For Inland Waterways Commission.
6 August	Raeburn	Cargo ship	Harland & Wolff	Belfast	United Kingdom	For Lamport & Holt.
8 August	Endurance	Aggressive-class minesweeper	J.M. Martinac Shipbuilding Corp.	Tacoma, Washington	United States	
9 August	LST-1156	Terrebonne Parish-class tank landing ship	Bath Iron Works	Bath, Maine	United States	First in class
19 August	Skeena	St. Laurent-class destroyer	Burrard Dry Dock	Vancouver, British Columbia	Canada	
21 August	Bodenham	Ham-class minesweeper	Brooke Marine Ltd.	Lowestoft	United Kingdom	For Royal Navy.
29 August	Impervious	Aggressive-class minesweeper	Martinolich Ship Building Co	San Diego, California	United States	
August	BA-1501	Tank barge	Alabama Drydock and Shipbuilding Company	Mobile, Alabama	United States	For Butcher - Arthur Co.
August	I.W.C. 139	Hopper barge	Alabama Drydock and Shipbuilding Company	Mobile, Alabama	United States	For Inland Waterways Commission.
August	I.W.C. 140	Hopper barge	Alabama Drydock and Shipbuilding Company	Mobile, Alabama	United States	For Inland Waterways Commission.
3 September	Leda	Ferry	Swan Hunter & Wigham Richardson	Wallsend	United Kingdom	For Det Bergenske Dampskibsselskab
6 September	Badger	Ferry	Christy Corporation	Sturgeon Bay, Wisconsin	United States	For Chesapeake and Ohio Railway
10 September	Brattland	Oil tanker	Burmeister & Wain	Copenhagen	Denmark	For Aktieselskabet Borgestad
16 September	Clydefield	Tanker	Harland & Wolff	Belfast	United Kingdom	For Hunting & Sons.
September	BA-1502	Tank barge	Alabama Drydock and Shipbuilding Company	Mobile, Alabama	United States	For Butcher - Arthur Co.
September	BA-1503	Tank barge	Alabama Drydock and Shipbuilding Company	Mobile, Alabama	United States	For Butcher - Arthur Co.
September	BA-1504	Tank barge	Alabama Drydock and Shipbuilding Company	Mobile, Alabama	United States	For Butcher - Arthur Co.
September	L.C.D. & T. CO. No. 101	Deck barge	Alabama Drydock and Shipbuilding Company	Mobile, Alabama	United States	For Lake Charles Dredging.
4 October	Aggressive	Aggressive-class minesweeper	Luders Marine Construction Co.	Stamford, Connecticut	United States	
4 October	Tahitien	Ocean liner	Arsenal de Brest	Brest, France	France	For Messageries Maritimes
11 October	Enhance	Aggressive-class minesweeper	Martinolich Ship Building Co	San Diego, California	United States	
18 October	Kungsholm	Ocean liner/Cruise ship	De Schelde Shipyard	Vlissingen	Netherlands	For Swedish American Line
21 October	Boreham	Ham-class minesweeper	Brooke Marine Ltd.	Lowestoft	United Kingdom	For Royal Navy.
23 October	Småland	Halland-class destroyer	Eriksbergs Mekaniska Verkstads AB	Gothenburg	Sweden	For Royal Swedish Navy
31 October	Kattwiek	type I ferry	Johann-Oelkers-Werft	Hamburg	West Germany	For HADAG
October	L.C.D. & T. CO. No. 102	Deck barge	Alabama Drydock and Shipbuilding Company	Mobile, Alabama	United States	For Lake Charles Dredging.
October	L.C.D. & T. CO. No. 103	Deck barge	Alabama Drydock and Shipbuilding Company	Mobile, Alabama	United States	For Lake Charles Dredging.
October	L.C.D. & T. CO. No. 104	Deck barge	Alabama Drydock and Shipbuilding Company	Mobile, Alabama	United States	For Lake Charles Dredging.
5 November	Cymric	Refrigerated cargo ship	Harland & Wolff	Belfast	United Kingdom	For Shaw Savill Line.
19 November	King Arthur	Cargo ship	Harland & Wolff	Belfast	United Kingdom	For King Line.
22 November	LST-1166	Terrebonne Parish-class tank landing ship	Christy Shipbuilding	Sturgeon Bay, Wisconsin	United States	
25 November	LST-1161	Terrebonne Parish-class tank landing ship	Ingalls Shipbuilding	Pascagoula, Mississippi	United States	
27 November	Voima	Icebreaker	Wärtsilä Hietalahti shipyard	Helsinki	Finland	
November	BA-1505	Tank barge	Alabama Drydock and Shipbuilding Company	Mobile, Alabama	United States	For Butcher - Arthur Co.
November	BA-1506	Tank barge	Alabama Drydock and Shipbuilding Company	Mobile, Alabama	United States	For Butcher - Arthur Co.
3 December	Beaverbank	Cargo ship	Harland & Wolff	Belfast	United Kingdom	For Bank Line.
6 December	LST-1157	Terrebonne Parish-class tank landing ship	Bath Iron Works	Bath, Maine	United States	
16 December	Conflict	Aggressive-class minesweeper	Fulton Shipyard	Antioch, California	United States	
16 December	Eddyrock	Eddy-class tanker	Blyth Dry Docks & Shipbuilding Co. Ltd	Blyth, Northumberland	United Kingdom	For Royal Fleet Auxiliary.
16 December	Wilhelmsburg	type I ferry	Ottensener Eisenwerke	Hamburg	West Germany	For HADAG
17 December	Dynamic	Aggressive-class minesweeper	Colberg Boat Works	Stockton, California	United States	
18 December	Nessbank	Cargo ship	Harland & Wolff	Belfast	United Kingdom	For Bank Line.
19 December	Blandford	Tanker	Harland & Wolff	Belfast	United Kingdom	For Blandford Shipping.
20 December	Esteem	Aggressive-class minesweeper	Martinolich Ship Building Co	San Diego, California	United States	
December	GISSEL 1605	Tank barge	Alabama Drydock and Shipbuilding Company	Mobile, Alabama	United States	For J. S. Gissel & Co.
December	GISSEL 1606	Tank barge	Alabama Drydock and Shipbuilding Company	Mobile, Alabama	United States	For J. S. Gissel & Co.
December	P.O. 2701	Tank barge	Alabama Drydock and Shipbuilding Company	Mobile, Alabama	United States	For Pure Oil Company.
December	P.O. 2702	Tank barge	Alabama Drydock and Shipbuilding Company	Mobile, Alabama	United States	For Pure Oil Company.
Unknown date	Aboine	Tug	J. Bolson & Son Ltd.	Poole	United Kingdom	For United Africa Co. Ltd.
Unknown date	Andoni	Tug	J. Bolson & Son Ltd.	Poole	United Kingdom	For United Africa Co. Ltd.
Unknown date	Bridge No. 4	Chain ferry	J. Bolson & Son Ltd.	Poole	United Kingdom	For Cowes Urban District Council.
Unknown date	Gatco No. 50	Tank barge	Alabama Drydock and Shipbuilding Company	Mobile, Alabama	United States	For General Atlantic Towing Co.
Unknown date	Gatco No. 51	Tank barge	Alabama Drydock and Shipbuilding Company	Mobile, Alabama	United States	For General Atlantic Towing Co.
Unknown date	Naseby	Tug	Brooke Marine Ltd.	Lowestoft	United Kingdom	For Docks & Inland Waterways Board.
Unknown date	Normannia	Ferry	William Denny and Brothers	Dumbarton	United Kingdom	For British Railways.
Unknown date	Olton	Tug	Brooke Marine Ltd.	Lowestoft	United Kingdom	For Docks & Inland Waterways Board.
Unknown date	Sulby	Tug	Brooke Marine Ltd.	Lowestoft	United Kingdom	For Docks & Inland Waterways Board.
Unknown date	TJ-221	Barge	Alabama Drydock and Shipbuilding Company	Mobile, Alabama	United States	For Thomas Jordan Inc.
Unknown date	TJ-222	Barge	Alabama Drydock and Shipbuilding Company	Mobile, Alabama	United States	For Thomas Jordan Inc.
Unknown date	TJ-223	Barge	Alabama Drydock and Shipbuilding Company	Mobile, Alabama	United States	For Thomas Jordan Inc.
Unknown date	TJ-224	Barge	Alabama Drydock and Shipbuilding Company	Mobile, Alabama	United States	For Thomas Jordan Inc.
Unknown date	TJ-225	Barge	Alabama Drydock and Shipbuilding Company	Mobile, Alabama	United States	For Thomas Jordan Inc.
Unknown date	TJ-226	Barge	Alabama Drydock and Shipbuilding Company	Mobile, Alabama	United States	For Thomas Jordan Inc.
Unknown date	TJ-227	Barge	Alabama Drydock and Shipbuilding Company	Mobile, Alabama	United States	For Thomas Jordan Inc.
Unknown date	TJ-228	Barge	Alabama Drydock and Shipbuilding Company	Mobile, Alabama	United States	For Thomas Jordan Inc.
Unknown date	Unnamed	Barge	Alabama Drydock and Shipbuilding Company	Mobile, Alabama	United States	For private owner.
