= List of United States Navy destroyer leaders =

Ships of the United States Navy

Ships in current service
- Current ships

Ships grouped alphabetically
- A–B; C; D–F; G–H; I–K; L; M; N–O; P; Q–R; S; T–V; W–Z

Ships grouped by type
- Aircraft carriers; Airships; Amphibious warfare ships; Auxiliaries; Battlecruisers; Battleships; Cruisers; Destroyers; Destroyer escorts; Destroyer leaders; Escort carriers; Frigates; Hospital ships; Littoral combat ships; Mine warfare vessels; Monitors; Oilers; Patrol vessels; Registered civilian vessels; Sailing frigates; Steam frigates; Steam gunboats; Ships of the line; Sloops of war; Submarines; Torpedo boats; Torpedo retrievers; Unclassified miscellaneous; Yard and district craft

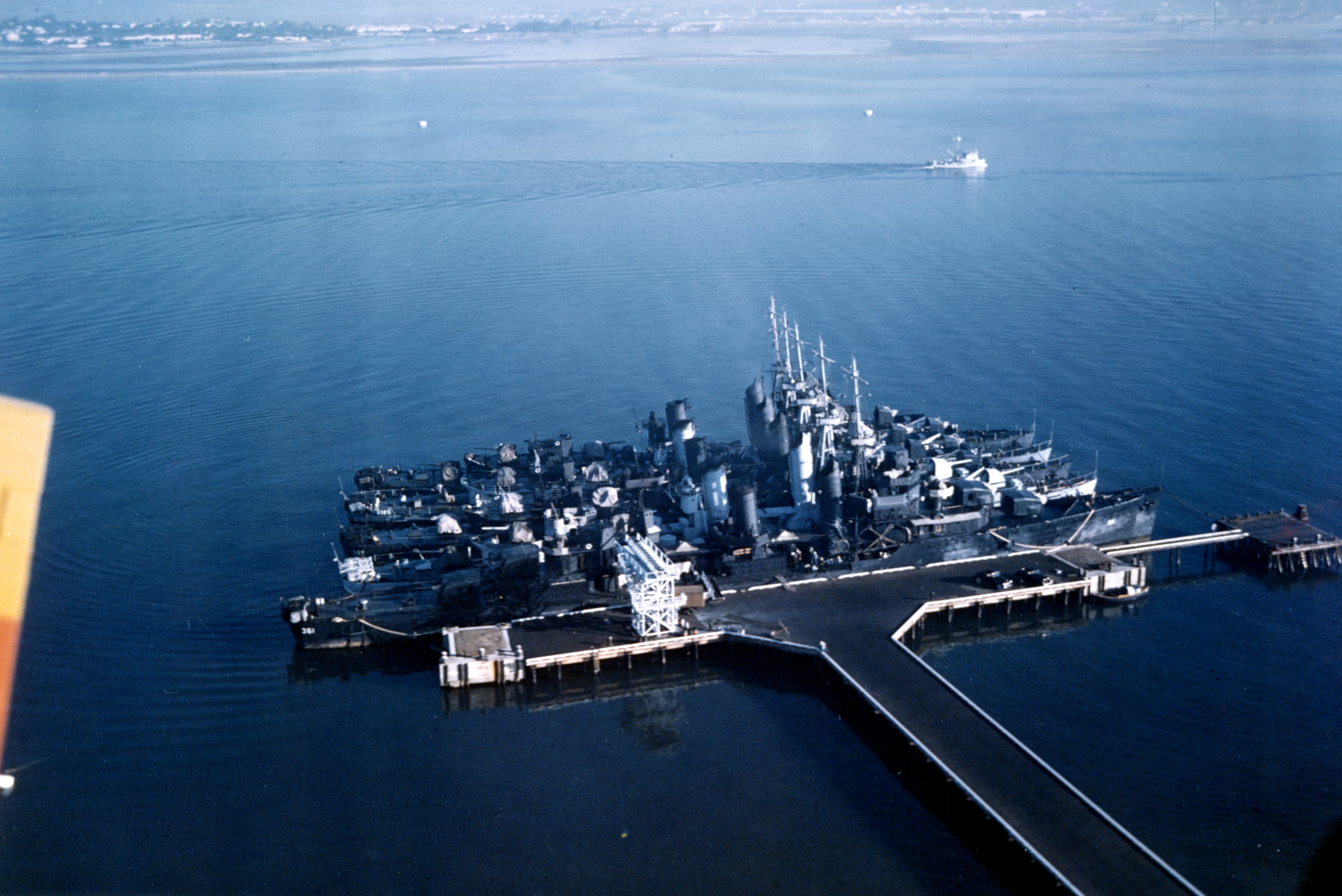
Flotilla leader USS Clark (DD-361) in front of smaller destroyers

In the 1930s, the United States Navy built two classes of flotilla leaders, the Porter class, and the Somers class. Due to the regulations of the London Naval Treaty, these 13 ships had a displacement of 1,850 tons, compared to the 1,500 tons of a "standard" destroyer, but they were still classed as destroyers and carried the hull classification of (DD). When the treaty ended with the outbreak of World War II in Europe in 1939, the much larger Fletcher class was constructed, making the differentiation irrelevant.

The Atlanta-class cruisers were also built during World War II to act in part as flotilla leaders, though they were mainly employed as antiaircraft cruisers.

Following the war, destroyer leader (DL) was a new hull classification symbol used by the U.S. Navy from the 1950s until 1975. These ships were more commonly called frigates, although they were much larger than frigates of other navies. They were intended to be larger and more capable than destroyers and to lead a destroyer task force.

All but the first five destroyer leaders would be designed as guided missile ships (DLG), and two of the first five would be converted to missile ships.

Eight of these ships would be nuclear powered and hold the hull classification (DLGN).

During the 1975 USN ship reclassification these ships were reclassified as guided missile destroyers (DDG) or guided missile cruisers (CG), depending on their size and capabilities; all the nuclear ships would be classed as (CGN). At the same time the smaller destroyer escorts (DE or DEG) were reclassified as 'frigates' (FF or FFG) and so US terminology was brought into line with that of the other NATO members. The last of the destroyer leaders was decommissioned in 1999. A total of 41 ships bore the DL classification.

United States Navy destroyer leaders
| Ship | Built as | Reclassified as | Class | Commissioned – decommissioned | NVR link |
|---|---|---|---|---|---|
| Norfolk | DL-1 (Note: Norfolk was ordered as CLK-1 prior to commissioning.) | —N/a | Norfolk | 1953–1970 | DL1 |
| Mitscher | DL-2 (Note: Mitscher was ordered as DD-927 prior to commissioning.) | DDG-35 | Mitscher | 1953–1978 | DDG35 |
| John S. McCain | DL-3 (Note: John S. McCain was ordered as DD-928 prior to commissioning.) | DDG-36 | Mitscher | 1953–1978 | DDG36 |
| Willis A. Lee | DL-4 (Note: Willis A. Lee was ordered as DD-929 prior to commissioning.) | —N/a | Mitscher | 1954–1969 | DL4 |
| Wilkinson | DL-5 (Note: Wilkinson was ordered as DD-930 prior to commissioning.) | —N/a | Mitscher | 1954–1969 | DL5 |
| Farragut | DLG-6 | DDG-37 | Farragut | 1960–1989 | DDG37 |
| Luce | DLG-7 | DDG-38 | Farragut | 1961–1991 | DDG38 |
| Macdonough | DLG-8 | DDG-39 | Farragut | 1961–1992 | DDG39 |
| Coontz | DLG-9 | DDG-40 | Farragut | 1960–1989 | DDG40 |
| King | DLG-10 | DDG-41 | Farragut | 1960–1991 | DDG41 |
| Mahan | DLG-11 | DDG-42 | Farragut | 1960–1993 | DDG42 |
| Dahlgren | DLG-12 | DDG-43 | Farragut | 1961–1992 | DDG43 |
| William V. Pratt | DLG-13 | DDG-44 | Farragut | 1961–1991 | DDG44 |
| Dewey | DLG-14 | DDG-45 | Farragut | 1959–1990 | DDG45 |
| Preble | DLG-15 | DDG-46 | Farragut | 1960–1991 | DDG46 |
| Leahy | DLG-16 | CG-16 | Leahy | 1962–1993 | CG16 |
| Harry E. Yarnell | DLG-17 | CG-17 | Leahy | 1963–1993 | CG17 |
| Worden | DLG-18 | CG-18 | Leahy | 1963–1993 | CG18 |
| Dale | DLG-19 | CG-19 | Leahy | 1963–1994 | CG19 |
| Richmond K. Turner | DLG-20 | CG-20 | Leahy | 1964–1995 | CG20 |
| Gridley | DLG-21 | CG-21 | Leahy | 1963–1994 | CG21 |
| England | DLG-22 | CG-22 | Leahy | 1963–1994 | CG22 |
| Halsey | DLG-23 | CG-23 | Leahy | 1963–1994 | CG23 |
| Reeves | DLG-24 | CG-24 | Leahy | 1964–1993 | CG24 |
| Bainbridge | DLGN-25 | CGN-25 | Bainbridge | 1962–1996 | CGN25 |
| Belknap | DLG-26 | CG-26 | Belknap | 1964–1995 | CG26 |
| Josephus Daniels | DLG-27 | CG-27 | Belknap | 1965–1994 | CG27 |
| Wainwright | DLG-28 | CG-28 | Belknap | 1966–1993 | CG28 |
| Jouett | DLG-29 | CG-29 | Belknap | 1966–1994 | CG29 |
| Horne | DLG-30 | CG-30 | Belknap | 1967–1994 | CG30 |
| Sterett | DLG-31 | CG-31 | Belknap | 1967–1994 | CG31 |
| William H. Standley | DLG-32 | CG-32 | Belknap | 1966–1994 | CG32 |
| Fox | DLG-33 | CG-33 | Belknap | 1966–1994 | CG33 |
| Biddle | DLG-34 | CG-34 | Belknap | 1967–1993 | CG34 |
| Truxtun | DLGN-35 | CGN-35 | Truxtun | 1967–1995 | CGN35 |
| California | DLGN-36 | CGN-36 | California | 1974–1999 | CGN36 |
| South Carolina (Note: South Carolina was the last ship commissioned as a DL type.) | DLGN-37 | CGN-37 | California | 1975–1999 | CGN37 |
| Virginia (Note: Ordered as DLGN, reclassified as CGN prior to commissioning.) | DLGN-38 | CGN-38 | Virginia | 1976–1994 | CGN38 |
| Texas | DLGN-39 | CGN-39 | Virginia | 1977–1993 | CGN39 |
| Mississippi | DLGN-40 | CGN-40 | Virginia | 1978–1997 | CGN40 |
| Arkansas | DLGN-41 | CGN-41 | Virginia | 1980–1998 | CGN41 |
