= Mitscher =

Mitscher may refer to:

== People ==
- Marc Mitscher (1887–1947), United States Navy admiral
- Oscar A. Mitscher, Early-day mayor of Oklahoma City, father of Admiral Marc Mitscher

== Other ==
- Mitscher-class destroyer, United States Navy experimental destroyer class
- USS Mitscher (DL-2), Mitscher-class destroyer launched in January 1952 and decommissioned in 1980
- USS Mitscher (DDG-57), Arleigh Burke-class destroyer commissioned in 1994
