= Ping (given name) =

Ping is a transliteration of multiple Chinese given names borne by:

== Ancient China ==
In chronological order

- King Ping of Zhou (died 720 BC), Chinese king
- Duke Ping of Jin (died 532 BC), ruler of Jin
- Duke Ping of Cao (died 524 BC), ruler of Cáo
- King Ping of Chu (died 516 BC), king of Chu
- Duke Ping of Qi (died 456 BC), titular ruler of Qi
- Chen Ping (Han Dynasty) (died 178 BC), chancellor to Emperor Gaozu
- Prince Ping of Liang (r. 137–97 BC)
- Emperor Ping of Han (9 BC–AD 6), Chinese emperor
- Xin Ping (died 204), a minister under the warlord Han Fu
- Guan Ping (died 219), general serving the warlord Liu Bei
- Wen Ping, third century general under the warlord Cao Cao
- Wang Ping (Three Kingdoms) (died 248), officer under Liu Bei, made a major general after defecting to Shu Han
- Murong Ping, fourth century regent of the Chinese state of Former Yan
- Xue Ping (753?–832), general of the Tang Dynasty

== Other ==
In alphabetical order

- Ping Chong (born 1946), American contemporary theater director, choreographer, writer and artist
- Ping Coombes (born 1981), chef
- Ping Fu (born 1958), American computer scientist, entrepreneur and author
- Ping Hsin-tao (1927–2019), Taiwanese publisher
- Ping Liu, neurobiology professor
- He Ping (1957–2023), Chinese film director
- Hsin Ping (1938–1995), Chinese Buddhist abbot
- Lang Ping (born 1960), former Chinese volleyball player and former head coach of the United States women's national volleyball team
- Luo Ping (1733–1799), Chinese painter
- Song Ping (1917–2026), Communist Chinese politician and governor
- Zhang Ping (politician) (born 1946), Chinese politician
- Zhang Ping (volleyball) (born 1982), Chinese volleyball player
- Wang Ping (author), Chinese-American author and academic
