= Theodore Stark Wilkinson =

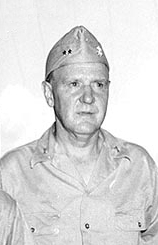
- Theodore Wilkinson in 1944
- Born: December 22, 1888; Annapolis, Maryland, US
- Died: February 21, 1946 (aged 57); Norfolk, Virginia, US
- Burial place: Arlington National Cemetery
- Relatives: James Wilkinson (great-great-grandfather); Theodore Stark Wilkinson (uncle); Ernest Wilkinson (father); Gulie Bustick Wilkinson (mother); Catherine Harlow (wife); Ann Harlow Wilkinson (daughter); Theodore Stark Wilkinson III (son)
- Military career
- Allegiance: United States of America
- Branch: United States Navy
- Service years: 1905 – 1946
- Rank: Vice admiral
- Nickname: "Ping"
- Conflicts: Veracruz, Mexico; World War I World War II
- Awards: Medal of Honor; Navy Distinguished Service Medal (3)

Theodore Stark "Ping" Wilkinson (December 22, 1888 – February 21, 1946) was a vice admiral of the United States Navy during World War II. He also received the Medal of Honor for his actions in Veracruz, Mexico.

== Early life and career ==
Wilkinson as a midshipman at the United States Naval Academy

After attending St. Paul's School in Concord, New Hampshire, where his writings for school publications evinced an early interest in naval and amphibious warfare, Wilkinson entered the United States Naval Academy in 1905 and graduated first in the class of 1909. Among his classmates were Olaf M. Hustveldt, Alan G. Kirk, and Jesse B. Oldendorf. He served the two years of sea duty then required by law prior to commissioning, in the battleships USS Kansas (BB-21) and USS South Carolina (BB-26), before he received his ensign's commission on June 5, 1911. He enrolled at George Washington University, Washington, D.C., joining Phi Sigma Kappa fraternity, and was instructed under the auspices of the Navy's Bureau of Ordnance (BuOrd). Wilkinson reported to the battleship USS Florida (BB-30) on July 25, 1913, for sea duty. During his time in that dreadnought, Ens. Wilkinson led Florida's 2d Company in action during the landings on 21 and April 22, 1914, at Veracruz, Mexico. For his skillful and courageous leadership of that unit of the battleship's landing force and his exhibition of "eminent and conspicuous" conduct, he received the Medal of Honor.

== World War I and interwar years ==
On August 4, he was transferred to the armored cruiser USS Tennessee (ACR-10), and two days later sailed eastward in her across the Atlantic. Tennessee and USS North Carolina (ACR-12) were ordered to European waters to evacuate Americans trapped on the continent by the outbreak of World War I. On September 3, he became an assistant to the naval attaché at Paris and a month later left that post to join North Carolina in the Mediterranean. Subsequently, the young officer had tours of sea duty: first as aide, to Commander, 2d Division, Atlantic Fleet, and then as aide to the commander of the 7th Division.

From July 1916 to July 1919, Wilkinson served with distinction as the head of the Experimental Section, Bureau of Ordnance, where he developed ordnance materials and devices, most notable being a noxious gas filler for shells and an "exceptionally satisfactory smoke screen". Additionally, he was deemed largely responsible for the successful design of a depth charge and for the development of the firing mechanism of the Mark VI mine used in the North Sea Mine Barrage.

Following that tour ashore—for which he received a letter of commendation—Wilkinson went to sea, first serving as gunnery officer in the battleship Kansas and later as fire control officer in USS Pennsylvania (BB-38). In 1921 and 1922, Wilkinson commanded, in succession, the destroyers USS Osborne (DD-295), USS Goff (DD-247), and USS Taylor (DD-94), before he returned to BuOrd's experimental section.

After commanding the destroyer USS King (DD-242) from January 1925 to December 1926, Wilkinson headed the Records Section of the Bureau of Navigation (BuNav) Officer Personnel Division. In June 1930, he became fleet gunnery officer and aide to Commander, Scouting Fleet (later, Commander, Scouting Force), Rear Admiral A. L. Willard. Detached from that duty in December 1931, he soon assumed the duties of secretary to the Navy's General Board. While in that assignment, Wilkinson had additional duty during the arms limitation talks at Geneva in 1933 and in London in 1934.

From September 1934 to June 1936, Wilkinson served as executive officer of USS Indianapolis (CA-35). Over the next three years, he headed the Planning Division of BuNav and then returned to Indianapolis, this time in a staff capacity, as Chief of Staff to Commander, Scouting Force. In January 1941, he fleeted up to command the battleship USS Mississippi (BB-41).

== World War II ==
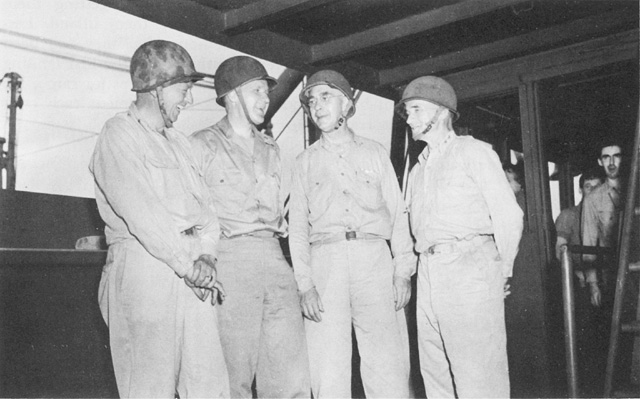
Wilkinson, second from left, with Brigadier General Leonard F. Wing, Rear Admiral Richmond K. Turner, and Major General John H. Hester aboard Turner's flagship during the New Georgia Campaign.

Detached from that duty and promoted to rear admiral, Wilkinson was assigned as director of the Office of Naval Intelligence (ONI) on October 15. His new responsibilities inevitably embroiled him in the subsequent controversy over whether the US Pacific Fleet Commander at Pearl Harbor was sufficiently warned of the danger of a Japanese attack before December 7 – an issue on which Wilkinson testified for three days before a joint congressional committee in December 1945.

According to his testimony and that of others, ONI was responsible for collecting and evaluating intelligence, but R. Adm. Richmond Kelly Turner, Director of War Plans, had sought and received the authority in 1940 to control information sent to the fleet on "enemy intentions" and "the strategic picture." Exercising this authority, Turner had prepared messages to fleet commanders on November 24 that "a surprise aggressive movement on the Philippines or Guam is a distinct possibility," and on November 27 stating that "this is a war warning…an aggressive move by Japan is expected within the next few days…indicates an amphibious expedition against either the Philippines, Thai or Kra Peninsula or possibly Borneo…execute appropriate defensive deployment." Wilkinson had followed these messages up on December 2 with a message to the fleet commanders reporting that Japanese consuls had been instructed to destroy their codes—a standard precaution for hostilities. No further warnings were sent to the US fleet until just before the attack on December 7, when hostilities had become even more clearly imminent from overnight decryption of Japanese "Purple code" intercepts.

When asked for his opinion at the time about Japanese intentions, Turner said that he had always thought that there was a 50-50 chance that they would attack Pearl Harbor at the outset. The congressional committee noted that he was "the only officer in Washington in the higher echelons who thought so." Wilkinson, in contrast, admitted that he had believed it was more likely that Japan would strike first somewhere in the southwest Pacific and avoid an immediate direct confrontation with the US – an opinion which the committee report found to have been widely shared by senior US officers before the attack.

=== South Pacific campaign ===
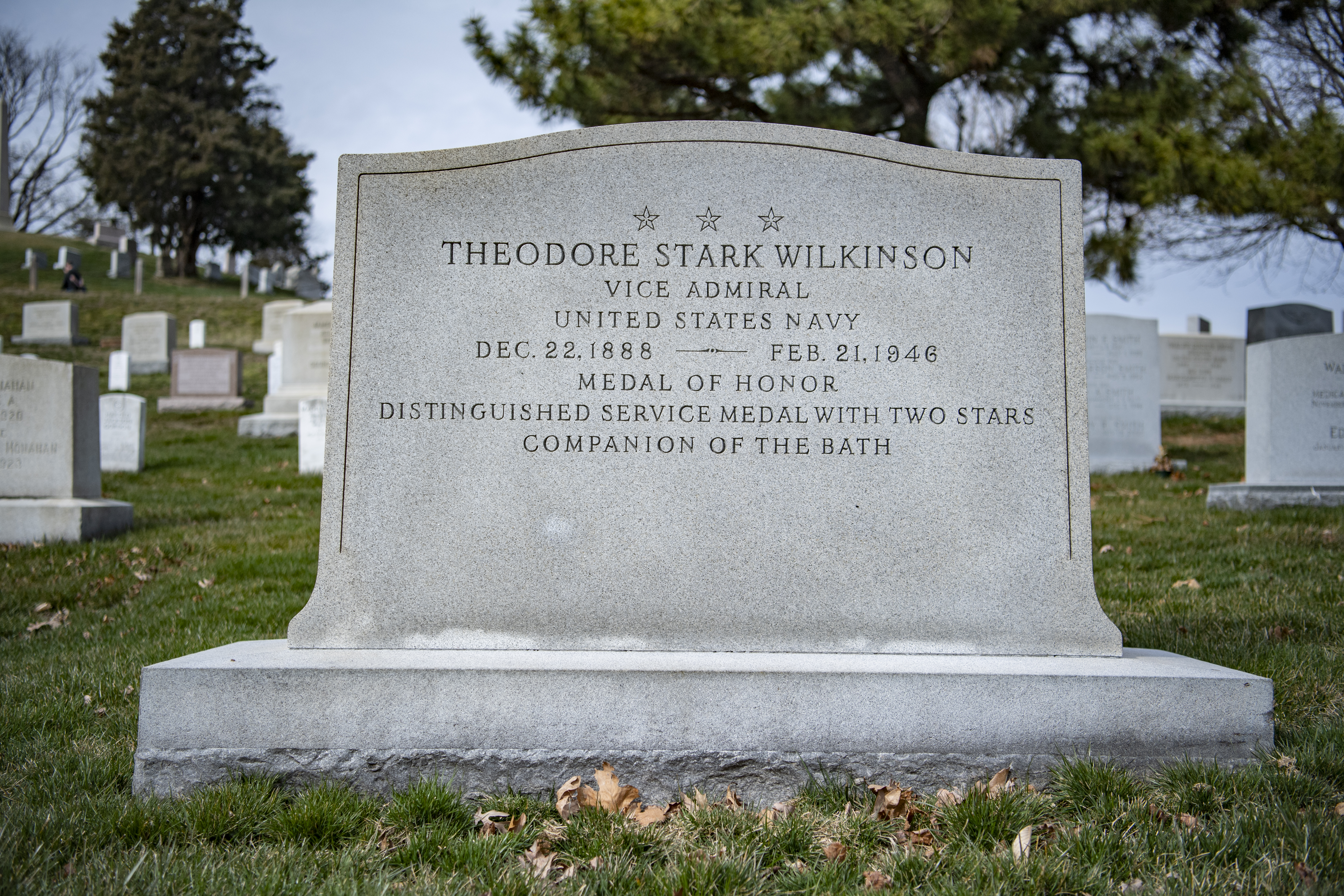
Grave at Arlington National Cemetery

From ONI, Wilkinson was assigned briefly as Commander, Battleship Division 2, Pacific Fleet, in August 1942, then as Deputy Commander, South Pacific, under Admiral William Halsey and General Douglas MacArthur as theater commander beginning in January 1943. Halsey was designated Third Fleet Commander in March, and Wilkinson became Commander of the I Marine Amphibious Corps (later III Amphibious Corps) in July 1943.

In those positions, he is credited by naval historian Samuel Eliot Morison with developing the US "leapfrogging" strategy designed to seize control of the Southwest Pacific islands occupied by Japan. Rather than attack Japanese bases and fortifications frontally, the strategy was to "hit them where they ain't," by occupying positions behind their forward outposts and cutting their supply lines. The strategy was so successful that Japanese war czar Tojo before his death told General MacArthur that it was one of the three principal factors that defeated Japan. (The other two factors were US submarine effectiveness and long-distance US carrier operations.) Wilkinson was interviewed by New Zealand's National Broadcasting Service mobile recording unit while serving in the Solomon Islands in December 1943, and his broadcast on the fighting in the Treasury Islands can be heard online.

Pursuing this strategy, Wilkinson earned the Distinguished Service Medal (DSM) for commanding the amphibious forces in the assaults on New Georgia, Vella Lavella, and the Treasury Islands; and established a key position on the west coast of Bougainville. He was promoted to vice admiral in 1944, and won a gold star in lieu of a second DSM for his leadership in the assaults that took Peleliu and Angaur in the Palaus, and Ulithi in the Carolines.

Subsequently, Wilkinson earned another gold star in lieu of a third DSM, for commanding Task Force 79 (TF 79) in action in the Philippines between October 1, 1944, and January 18, 1945—operations that included the landings conducted by the Southern Attack Force on Leyte in October 1944 and at Lingayen in January 1945.

Ordered to the Navy Department in September 1945 for temporary duty, Vice Admiral Wilkinson became a member of the Joint Strategic Survey Committee of the Joint Chiefs of Staff in January 1946. He was serving in that capacity when he lost his life on February 21, 1946, in a ferry accident at Hampton Roads, in which he was able to save his wife Catherine from drowning but was unable to escape himself.

He is buried at Arlington National Cemetery and his grave can be found in section 2, Lot 3645.

== Decorations ==
=== Medal of Honor citation ===
Rank and organization: Ensign, U.S. Navy. Born: December 22, 1888, Annapolis, Md. Appointed from: Louisiana. G.O. No.: 177, December 4, 1915. Other Navy award: Distinguished Service Medal with gold stars in lieu of 2 additional DSM's.

Citation:

For distinguished conduct in battle, engagements of Vera Cruz, 21 and April 22, 1914. Ens. Wilkinson was in both days' fighting at the head of his company and was eminent and conspicuous in his conduct, leading his men with skill and courage.

=== Ribbon bar ===
Vice Admiral Theodore Stark Wilkinson´s ribbon bar:

1st Row	Medal of Honor		
2nd Row	Navy Distinguished Service Medal with two gold stars	Mexican Service Medal	World War I Victory Medal with "Escort" Clasp
3rd Row	American Defense Service Medal with "A" device	American Campaign Medal	Asiatic-Pacific Campaign Medal with four campaign stars
4th Row	World War II Victory Medal	Companion of the Order of the Bath	Philippine Liberation Medal with one campaign stars

== Namesake ==
In 1952, the destroyer leader USS Wilkinson (DL-5) was named in his honor.

== See also ==
- List of Medal of Honor recipients (Veracruz)
