= MV Tahitien =

- The Atalante laid up at the end of her career.

History
- Name: 1953-1972: Tahitien; 1972-1991: Atalante; 1991-1992: Homericus; 1992-2005: Atalante
- Operator: 1953–1972: Messageries Maritimes; 1972–1991:Aphrodite Cruises/Mediterranean Sun Lines; 1991–1992: Epirotiki Lines; 1993–2004: Paradise Cruises
- Builder: Arsenal de Brest
- Yard number: ME2
- Launched: 4 October 1952
- Completed: January 1953
- In service: 1953
- Out of service: 2004
- Identification: IMO number: 5348744
- Fate: Scrapped 2005

General characteristics
- Tonnage: 13,562 tons
- Length: 549 feet
- Beam: 67 feet
- Draught: 25 feet
- Propulsion: Twin screws
- Speed: 17 knots
- Capacity: 635 passengers
- Crew: 160

MV Tahitien was a 1953 built ocean liner and later cruise ship originally built for the French shipping company Messageries Maritimes along with her sister the Calédonien.

== History ==
Tahitien was launched on 4 October 1952 and completed in January 1953. She entered service on the Marseille to French Polynesia run. She operated in this service until the heavy competition from the Jet airliner industry caught up with Messageries Maritimes, who ended their passenger services and sold nearly their entire fleet, including Tahitien. She would next be owned by the Limassol based Aphrodite Cruises (later named Mediterranean Sun Lines) who renamed her the Atalante. Atalante was extensively refitted for low fare cruising in the Mediterranean, a role she became mildly popular carrying out.

The Atalante would be rebuilt again in 1978 and 1993, allowing her facilities and accommodations to be improved. After the Oceanos sank in 1991 Atalante was leased to the Epirotiki Lines, who renamed her Homericus. Her name was reverted to Atalante in 1992 and she was laid up. Later that year Atalante was purchased by Paradise Cruises. Paradise carried out her 1993 refit, which saw her superstructure extended and a showlounge added. She operated once again as a cruise ship, and her service prospered fairly successfully until scrap metal prices skyrocketed in summer 2004. Although she was in good condition, Atalante sailed to Alang, India in 2005, where she was beached and scrapped. Her sister Calédonien was scrapped in 1975.
