= USS Norfolk (DL-1) =

1951 US Navy destroyer leader

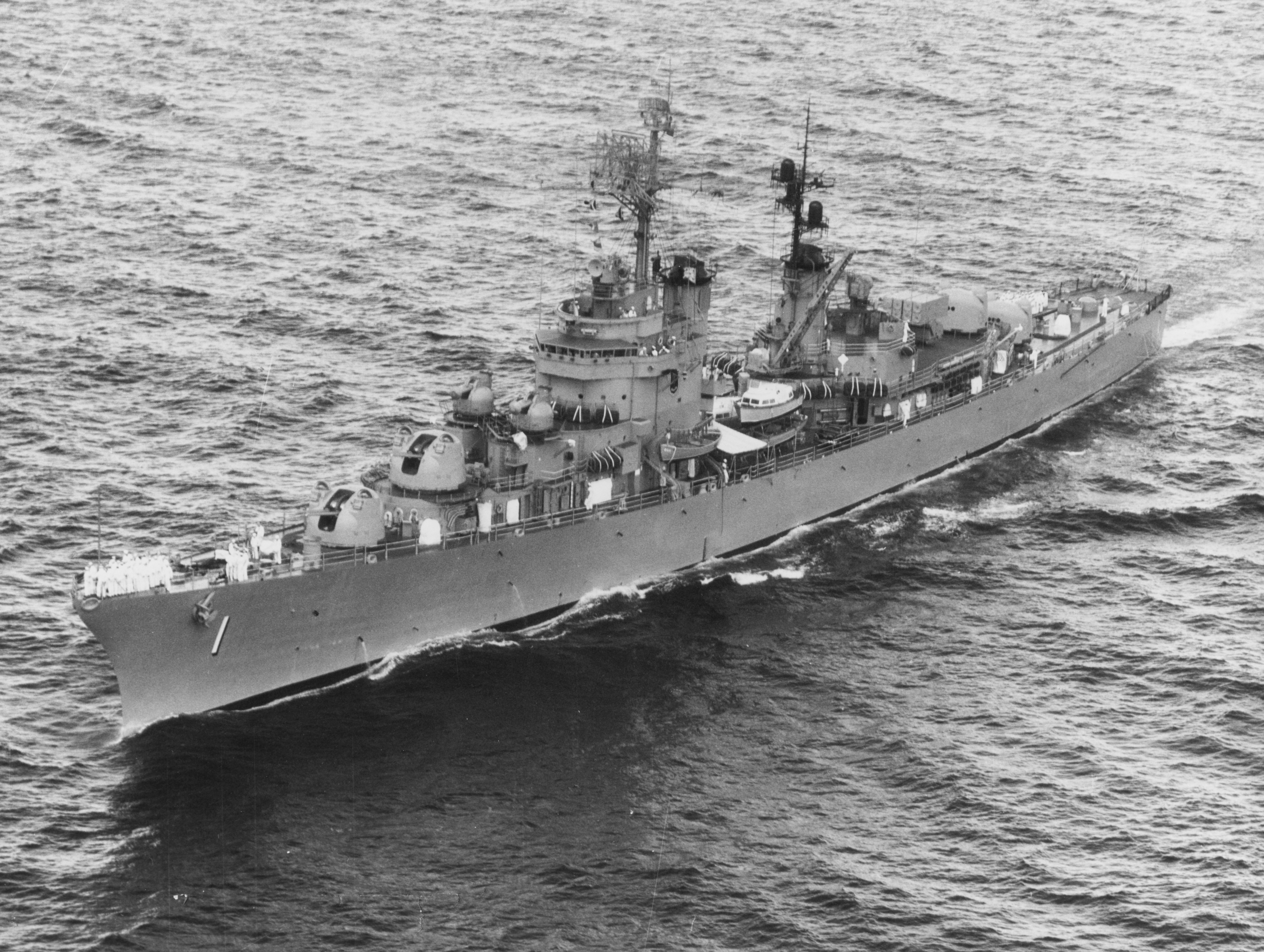
- USS Norfolk (DL-1) underway in the mid-1960s

Class overview
- Name: Norfolk class
- Builders: New York Ship, NY (1)
- Preceded by: Gearing class
- Succeeded by: Mitscher class
- Planned: 2
- Completed: 1
- Canceled: 1
- Scrapped: 1

History

United States
- Name: USS Norfolk
- Builder: New York Shipbuilding Corporation
- Laid down: 1 September 1949
- Launched: 29 December 1951
- Commissioned: 4 March 1953
- Decommissioned: 15 January 1970
- Stricken: 1 November 1973
- Identification: Callsign: NQMR Hull number: DL-1
- Fate: Sold 22 August 1974 and scrapped

General characteristics
- Type: Destroyer leader
- Displacement: 5,600 tons
- Length: 520 ft (158.5 m) waterline; 540 ft (164.6 m) overall
- Beam: 53 ft 6 in (16.3 m)
- Draft: 19 ft (5.8 m)
- Propulsion: 80,000 hp 60 MW diesel generators steam turbines, electro 500 kW initially 2 × 250 kW generators then 300, final 3 MW 4 × 750 kW
- Speed: 32 knots
- Range: 6,000 nmi (11,000 km; 6,900 mi) at 20 kn (37 km/h; 23 mph)
- Complement: Officer: 42; Enlisted: 504
- Sensors & processing systems: AN/SQS-23 SONAR; Mark 56 fire-control system
- Armament: 1953; 8 × 3 in (76 mm)/50 caliber guns; 16 × 20 mm (0.79 in) AA guns; 4 × Weapon Alpha ASW rocket launcher; 8 × 21 in (533 mm) torpedo tubes; 1960; 8 × 3 in (76 mm)/70 caliber guns; 4 × Weapon Alpha ASW rocket launcher; 1 × ASROC octuple launcher; 8 × 21 in (533 mm) torpedo tubes

The second USS Norfolk (DL-1) was the first destroyer leader of the United States Navy. Originally projected as a hunter-killer cruiser, she was in service until 1970, and was scrapped in 1974.

== History ==
The first major U.S. warship built after the construction boom of World War II, Norfolk was designed beginning in 1945, designated project SCB 1 in 1946, and authorized in 1947 as CLK-1, an anti-submarine hunter killer ship which could operate under all weather conditions and would carry the latest radar, sonar, and other electronic devices. She was designed on a light cruiser hull so she could carry a greater variety of detection gear than a destroyer. She was laid down 1 September 1949 by the New York Shipbuilding Corporation, Camden, New Jersey, launched 29 December 1951 with the destroyer leader reclassification DL-1, sponsored by Miss Betty King Duckworth, and commissioned 4 March 1953, Capt. Clarence Matheson Bowley in command.

After her Caribbean shakedown cruise (February 1954), Norfolk was assigned to the U.S. Atlantic Fleet and between 1955 and 1957 served successively as flagship for Commander Destroyer Flotillas 2, 4, and 6. During 1956 and 1957 she acted as flagship for Commander Destroyer Force, Atlantic Fleet. In June 1957, Norfolk participated in the International Fleet Review as flagship for Admiral Jerauld Wright, Commander-in-Chief Atlantic Fleet and Supreme Allied Commander Atlantic for NATO.

A boiler on the ship blew up in late 1955.

By 1959 Norfolk's eight 3 inch/50 caliber guns had been replaced by eight 3 inch/70 caliber guns and her 20 mm battery had been removed. In 1960 the addition of an ASROC launcher enhanced her antisubmarine capabilities.

On 10 May 1960, an 83-foot Cuban vessel harassed Norfolk while she was patrolling the Florida Straits with The Sullivans in Cuban waters.

In Fall 1961 she took part in UNITAS II as flagship for Commander Cruiser Destroyer Flotilla 2. During the operation she performed ASW training exercises with the navies of Venezuela, Colombia, Ecuador, Peru, Chile, Argentina, Uruguay, and Brazil. Norfolk repeated this cruise over the next five years during which she served as flagship of Commander South Atlantic Forces except in 1962 when she was flagship for Commander Cruiser Destroyer Forces Atlantic Fleet.

In 1965 she was the flagship for UNITAS VI.

Norfolk joined LANTFLEX 66 as flagship between 28 November and 16 December 1966. During this exercise she shadowed the Russian trawlers Repiter and Teodilit. She proved her antisubmarine capabilities again as flagship for Commander South Atlantic Forces during UNITAS VIII in Fall 1967.

Norfolk was assigned to Commander Middle East Force as flagship (17 April–15 October 1968). On this mission she visited Bahrain, French Somaliland, Saudi Arabia, Ethiopia. Kenya, the Seychelles, Mauritius, Malagasy Republic, India, Pakistan, Australia, New Zealand, Tahiti, Mexico, and Panama Canal Zone.

In October 1968 Norfolk returned to Norfolk where she decommissioned 15 January 1970 and entered the Atlantic Reserve Fleet. By 1 September 1974, Norfolk was stricken from the Naval Vessel Register and sold for scrap.

== CLK-2 ==
A projected sister ship, to be named New Haven, was deferred and then cancelled in favor of the smaller and less expensive Mitscher-class destroyers, due to the high cost ($61.9 million, $828 million today) of Norfolk. While Norfolk was fully combat ready, she was effectively a one ship class experiment that tested new ASW weapons and concepts.

== Memorials ==
Two of Norfolk's 3″/70 gun mounts were saved from the scrap heap and were on display at the Naval Training Center in Orlando, Florida. When NTC-Orlando closed, the Boca Raton Community High School's NJROTC requested custodianship of the mounts. The guns then stood near the east end zone of the football field in Boca Raton, Florida. The two mounts were then moved to Naval Station Norfolk by November 2020 and with the help of volunteers of current and former military personnel have been in the process of cleaning and preserving them in preparation for their display in front of Commander Naval Surface Force Atlantic headquarters. In May of 2026 the guns were placed on display by Gate 2.

Norfolk's bell is preserved in Norfolk, Virginia. From 1975 to 1987 the bell was located at the foot of St. Paul's Boulevard along the Elizabeth River waterfront. The bell was moved to Town Point Park and then eventually relocated to Wisconsin Square, Norfolk, just north of the museum ship berth of USS Wisconsin.36°50′56.3″N 76°17′39.7″W

== See also ==
- List of cruisers of the United States Navy § Hunter-Killer cruisers (CLK)
- USS Carpenter (DDK-825), a testbed for Norfolk
