= Ping Liu =

New Zealand neurobiologist

- Born: 1964 (age 61–62)

Academic background
- Education: Anhui University, University of Otago
- Thesis: Perirhinal cortex contributions to spatial memory (1998)
- Doctoral advisor: David Bilkey

Ping Liu (born 1964) is a Chinese New Zealand academic and full professor at the University of Otago, specialising in neurobiology, particularly the role of arginine metabolism in brain function during normal ageing and in disorders such as schizophrenia and Alzheimer's disease.

== Academic career ==
Liu is a neurobiologist with a medical background. She completed an MB at Anhui University and then worked for eight years as a geriatrician in China before joining her husband in New Zealand, where he had studied. Liu realised that working as a doctor in New Zealand would be difficult due to the language barrier, so made the decision to retrain as a researcher. She joined the staff of the University of Otago in 1994, and began a PhD in the Department of Psychology, supervised by David Bilkey, the following year. She completed her doctoral thesis, titled Perirhinal cortex contributions to spatial memory in 1998, and rose to full professor in 2020. She is part of the Otago's Brain Health Research Centre.

Liu's research focuses on neurodegenerative disorders such as schizophrenia and Alzheimer's disease, and on the changes in memory, learning and brain metabolism during normal ageing. Liu investigates the metabolic products of the semi-essential amino acid arginine. Liu's research has shown that altered arginine metabolism is associated with both schizophrenia and Alzheimer's disease. One metabolic product of arginine, agmatine, is a possible new neurotransmitter, but its role in learning and memory is as yet poorly understood. Liu's research group uses animal models and post-mortem human brain tissue to investigate how these changed processes lead to disease, and to try to identify possible diagnostic tests and therapeutic targets. In particular, Liu believes that arginine metabolites might present a less-invasive and costly test for Alzheimer's disease than the present diagnostic tests of brain scans and cerebrospinal fluid testing. It might also be possible to diagnose people earlier through such biomarkers. Liu is also investigating whether arginine metabolism differences might be involved in the clinical differences seen between early and late-onset Alzheimer's disease.

Liu's group is also researching the effects of prenatal viral exposure in children.

== Selected works ==
- John E Piletz; Feyza Aricioglu; Juei-Tang Cheng; et al. (2013). "Agmatine: clinical applications after 100 years in translation". Drug Discovery Today. 18 (17–18): 880–893. doi:10.1016/j.drudis.2013.05.017. PMID 23769988. Wikidata Q34351125.
- Liu, Píng; Michael S Fleete; Yu Jing; Nicola Collie; Curtis, Maurice Anthony; Waldvogel, Henry; Faull, Richard Lewis Maxwell; Abraham, Wickliffe Carson; Hu Zhang (2014). "Altered arginine metabolism in Alzheimer's disease brains". Neurobiology of Aging. 35 (9): 1992–2003. doi:10.1016/j.neurobiolaging.2014.03.013. PMID 24746363. Wikidata Q53463642.
- Liu, Píng; Bilkey, David Keith (2001). "The effect of excitotoxic lesions centered on the hippocampus or perirhinal cortex in object recognition and spatial memory tasks". Behavioral Neuroscience. 115 (1): 94–111. doi:10.1037/0735-7044.115.1.94. PMID 11256456. Wikidata Q33938704.
- Liu, Píng; D. K. Bilkey (1998). "Perirhinal cortex contributions to performance in the Morris water maze" (PDF). Behavioral Neuroscience. 112 (2): 304–315. doi:10.1037/0735-7044.112.2.304. PMID 9588480. Wikidata Q34468208.
- Liu, Píng; Smith, Paul; Cynthia L Darlington (2008). "Glutamate receptor subunits expression in memory-associated brain structures: regional variations and effects of aging". Synapse. 62 (11): 834–841. doi:10.1002/syn.20563. PMID 18720514. Wikidata Q46416264.
- Jiaxian Zhang; Yu Jing; Hu Zhang; Liu, Píng (2021). "Effects of sex and estrous cycle on the brain and plasma arginine metabolic profile in rats" (PDF). Amino Acids. 53 (9): 1441–1454. doi:10.1007/s00726-021-03040-5. PMID 34245369. Wikidata Q124094902.
- Faraz Ahmad; Liu, Píng (2021). "A Time-Efficient Fluorescence Spectroscopy-Based Assay for Evaluating Actin Polymerization Status in Rodent and Human Brain Tissues". JoVE (172). doi:10.3791/62268. Wikidata Q124094903.
