= USS Willis A. Lee =

Mitscher-class destroyer in the United States Navy

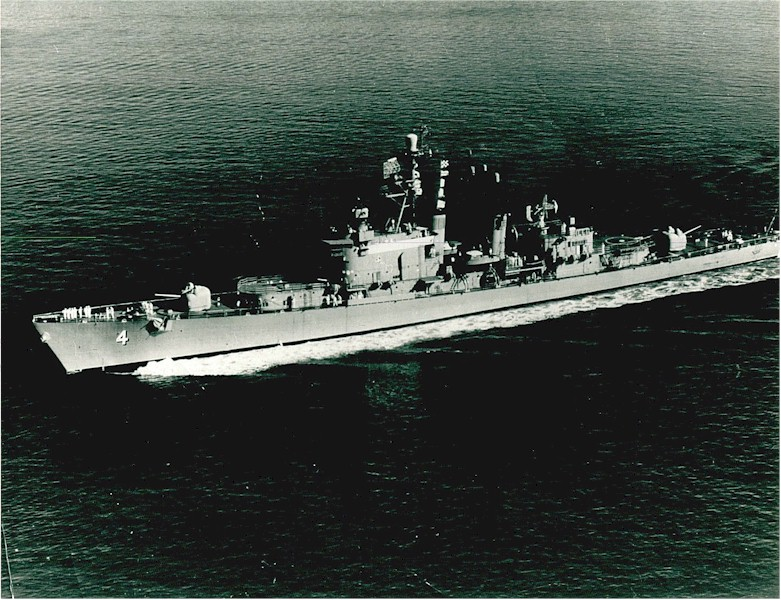
- USS Willis A. Lee (DL-4)

History

United States
- Namesake: Willis A. "Ching" Lee
- Builder: Bethlehem Steel, Fore River Shipyard
- Laid down: 1 November 1949
- Launched: 26 January 1952
- Commissioned: 5 October 1954
- Decommissioned: 19 December 1969
- Reclassified: DL-4, 9 February 1951
- Stricken: 15 May 1972
- Fate: Sold for scrap, 18 May 1973

General characteristics
- Class & type: Mitscher class destroyer
- Displacement: 4,730
- Length: 493 ft 0 in (150.27 m)
- Beam: 50 ft 0 in (15.24 m)
- Draft: 14 ft 0 in (4.27 m)
- Propulsion: 2 shaft; geared steam turbines; 4 boilers; 80,000 shp (60,000 kW)
- Speed: 30 knots (56 km/h; 35 mph)
- Range: 4,500 nmi (8,300 km; 5,200 mi) at 20 kn (37 km/h; 23 mph)
- Complement: 403
- Armament: 4 × 3 in (76 mm) guns; 8 × 20 mm guns; 4 × 21-inch (533 mm) torpedo tubes; 2 × Weapon Alpha ASW rocket launcher; 1 × depth charge rack

USS Willis A. Lee (DD-929) was a Mitscher-class destroyer in the United States Navy. She was named for Vice Admiral Willis A. "Ching" Lee USN (1888–1945).

Willis A. Lee was laid down by the Shipbuilding Division of the Bethlehem Steel Company at Quincy in Massachusetts on 1 November 1949, reclassified as a destroyer leader and designated DL-4 on 9 February 1951, launched on 26 January 1952 by Mrs. Fitzhugh L. Palmer Jr., niece of Vice Admiral Lee and commissioned at the Boston Naval Shipyard on 5 October 1954.

Willis A. Lee participated in quarantine operations during the Cuban Missile Crisis in October 1962. Willis A. Lee was decommissioned on 19 December 1969, stricken from the Naval Vessel Register on 15 May 1972 and sold for scrap to the Union Minerals and Alloys Corporation of New York City on 18 May 1973.

== History ==
Following her shakedown at Guantánamo Bay, Willis A. Lee returned to her homeport, Newport, R.I., and began a career of operations with the U.S. Atlantic Fleet. She was deployed to the Mediterranean for the first time in July 1955, cruising with the 6th Fleet—the first ship of her type to operate with that force. Upon the conclusion of her first tour with the 6th Fleet later that year, Willis A. Lee returned to the east coast and operated off the eastern seaboard in air defense exercises.

In February 1956, Willis A. Lee — reclassified as a frigate in 1955 — sailed southward to the Dominican Republic, where she represented the United States in American Day festivities at Ciudad Trujillo, the capital city of that West Indian nation. She was driven onto rocks at Jamestown, Rhode Island, in a storm on 18 March 1956. The frigate then spent considerable time at the Boston Naval Shipyard on Boston, Massachusetts, before resuming active operations. In November 1956, while participating in anti-submarine warfare (ASW) exercises, Willis A. Lee assisted the distressed fishing vessel, Agda, off Montauk Point, Long Island, fighting and extinguishing a blazing oil fire and thus saving several lives.

In February 1957, the ship carried King Ibn Saud, of Saudi Arabia, to New York City during his official visit to the United States. Later that month, she sailed to Washington, D.C., to participate in ceremonies honoring the birthday of George Washington. That spring, Willis A. Lee played "movie star", when she was filmed by the Louis de Rochemont studios for a part in the cinerama production, "Windjammer", while she operated on ASW exercises in the North Atlantic. She subsequently participated in the International Naval Review held that summer at Hampton Roads, Virginia, before becoming part of a large combined NATO fleet that conducted intensive ASW and air defense exercises in the North Atlantic that autumn. During those maneuvers, Willis A. Lee crossed the Arctic Circle for the first time on 20 September.

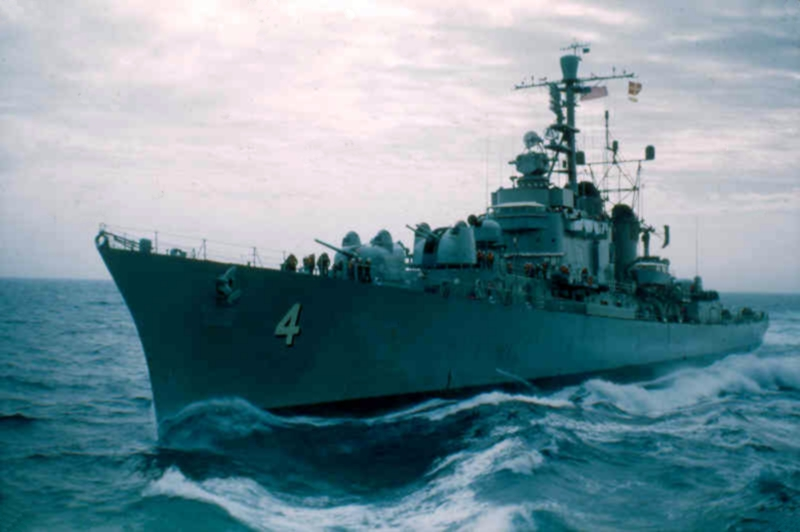
Willis A. Lee in the Mediterranean Sea, screening Franklin D. Roosevelt, 1959.

Over the next two years, Willis A. Lee was twice deployed to the Mediterranean for operations with the 6th Fleet, separating those tours with local operations out of Newport and in the Caribbean and off the coast of Florida, primarily on ASW and air defense exercises. In the summer of 1959, she participated in Operation "Inland Sea" as flagship for Rear Admiral E. B. Taylor, Commander, Task Force 47, on a cruise on the Great Lakes. During that historic voyage, she transited the newly opened St. Lawrence Seaway and visited the ports of Chicago, Illinois; Milwaukee, Wisconsin; Detroit, Michigan; Erie, Pennsylvania; and Cleveland, Ohio. That autumn, Willis A. Lee returned to her schedule of maneuvers and exercises in the North Atlantic.

Willis A. Lee, with Commander, Destroyer Force, Atlantic Fleet, embarked, conducted an inspection cruise — commencing in February 1960 — of Atlantic Fleet ports and installations that took the ship to San Juan, Puerto Rico; St. Thomas, Virgin Islands; and Ciudad Trujillo. Upon the conclusion of that cruise, the warship took part in Operation "Springboard", an annual exercise in the Caribbean.

In the summer of 1960, Willis A. Lee conducted a midshipmen's training cruise while participating in more fleet exercises. She subsequently visited Montreal, Quebec, Canada, and New York City before she took part in various refueling-at-sea and replenishment exercises as part of LANTFLEX (Atlantic Fleet Exercise) 2-60.

After a brief trip to Charleston, S.C., in August, Willis A. Lee participated in Operation "Sword Thrust," a NATO fleet exercise in the North Atlantic which combined the efforts of more than 60 British, French, Norwegian, Canadian, and American warships. While carrying out simulated attacks on the European continent during the course of the maneuvers, Willis A. Lee again crossed the Arctic Circle. After calling at Le Havre, France, Willis A. Lee returned to Newport. In November, she entered the Boston Naval Shipyard for an extensive overhaul, part of the Fleet Rehabilitation and Modernization (FRAM) program.

During her FRAM overhaul, Willis A. Lee was altered significantly to enable her to perform her designed role more efficiently. When she finally left the yard almost a year later, she displayed a distinctly altered silhouette. She then had a helicopter hangar in place of the after 3-inch twin gun mount to accommodate the Gyrodyne QH-50 DASH helicopter system. She had also received topside antisubmarine torpedo armament. Her two "Weapon Alfa" mounts had been removed. Chief among the new equipment installed in the ship was a bow-mounted sonar dome, utilizing revolutionary new concepts in underwater sound-ranging.

Emerging from the shipyard in September 1961, Willis A. Lee participated in a rescue operation soon thereafter, embarking the crew from the storm-endangered Texas Tower No. 2, off the coast of Massachusetts. Willis A. Lee then stood guard over the early warning tower, fighting off Hurricane Esther as she remained in the vicinity of the abandoned "Texas Tower."

Willis A. Lee spent much of her ensuing career involved in sonar evaluations of her bow-mounted system. She ranged from the mid-Atlantic to the Caribbean, frequently operating with submarines, and upon occasion visited Bermuda. There were highlights, though, of that normally routine duty, such as in the autumn of 1962 when the United States and the Soviet Union stood at the brink of a possible nuclear confrontation over the issue of Soviet missiles in Cuba. Willis A. Lee operated on the Cuban "quarantine line" for 10 days, deploying in the Caribbean until President Kennedy called off the operation. She then resumed her sonar evaluations.

After spending January and February 1963 at the Boston Naval Shipyard for more alterations and improvements on the experimental sonar system, Willis A. Lee operated in Haitian waters during March, conducting further sonar evaluations. She varied that duty with a brief in-port visit at Port-au-Prince during the troubled political situation there at that time.

That summer, Willis A. Lee was attached to Destroyer Development Group (DesDevGru) 2, a group of ships engaged in experimental work of various kinds, and finished out the year 1963 in the Boston Naval Shipyard undergoing extensive boiler repairs.

With the exception of two brief trips to Newport, Willis A. Lee remained at the Boston Naval Shipyard until 29 April 1964, when she returned to her home port to prepare for a southern cruise. Underway on 6 May for type training in Guantánamo Bay, the frigate conducted further sonar evaluations later that month en route back to Newport before returning to her home port on 26 May. Willis A. Lee subsequently conducted three more evaluation cruises before she participated in Exercise "Steel Pike," the largest peacetime amphibious exercise in history. During those maneuvers, Willis A. Lee served as the flagship for Rear Admiral Mason Freeman, Commander, Cruiser-Destroyer Flotilla 2. To then round out the year, the frigate conducted another sonar evaluation cruise, calling twice at Key West during the voyage. She returned north on 11 December and spent the remainder of the year under restricted availability at the Bethlehem Steel Shipyard, East Boston, Mass.

Willis A. Lee resumed sonar testing operations in 1965 and operated twice in the Bahamas area. She subsequently conducted type training off the Virginia capes and in the Narragansett Bay area before arriving at the Boston Naval Shipyard on 30 June to commence a lengthy overhaul to her engineering plant and modifications to her sonar system.

For the remainder of her career, Willis A. Lee continued in her routine of sonar development and testing, home-ported out of Newport with occasional periods of yard repairs at Boston. During her final years, the frigate operated off the Virginia capes, in the Caribbean, and Narragansett Bay areas, and was deployed to the Mediterranean November 1966. She returned to Newport on 20 May 1967, thus completing her first extended deployment since 1961. She was deployed again to the Mediterranean January 1968, returning to Newport in May of that year. In August 1968, she was deployed to the Red Sea as the flagship for COMMIDEASTFOR. However, what was to be a 10-month deployment was cut short when she developed propulsion problems while in transit off the coast of Brazil. After undergoing two weeks of repair in Recife, Brazil, she was relieved by USS Luce (DLG-7), and returned to Newport. In January 1969, she transited from Newport to the Boston Naval Shipyard via the Cape Cod Canal for what was to be her final overhaul prior to decommissioning later that year.

== Fate ==
Placed out of commission in December 1969, Willis A. Lee was struck from the Navy list on 15 May 1972. She was sold to the Union Minerals and Alloys Corporation, of New York City, and taken under tow for her final voyage on 5 June 1973. She was subsequently scrapped.

== Awards ==
- National Defense Service Medal
- Armed Forces Expeditionary Medal
