= USS Wilkinson =

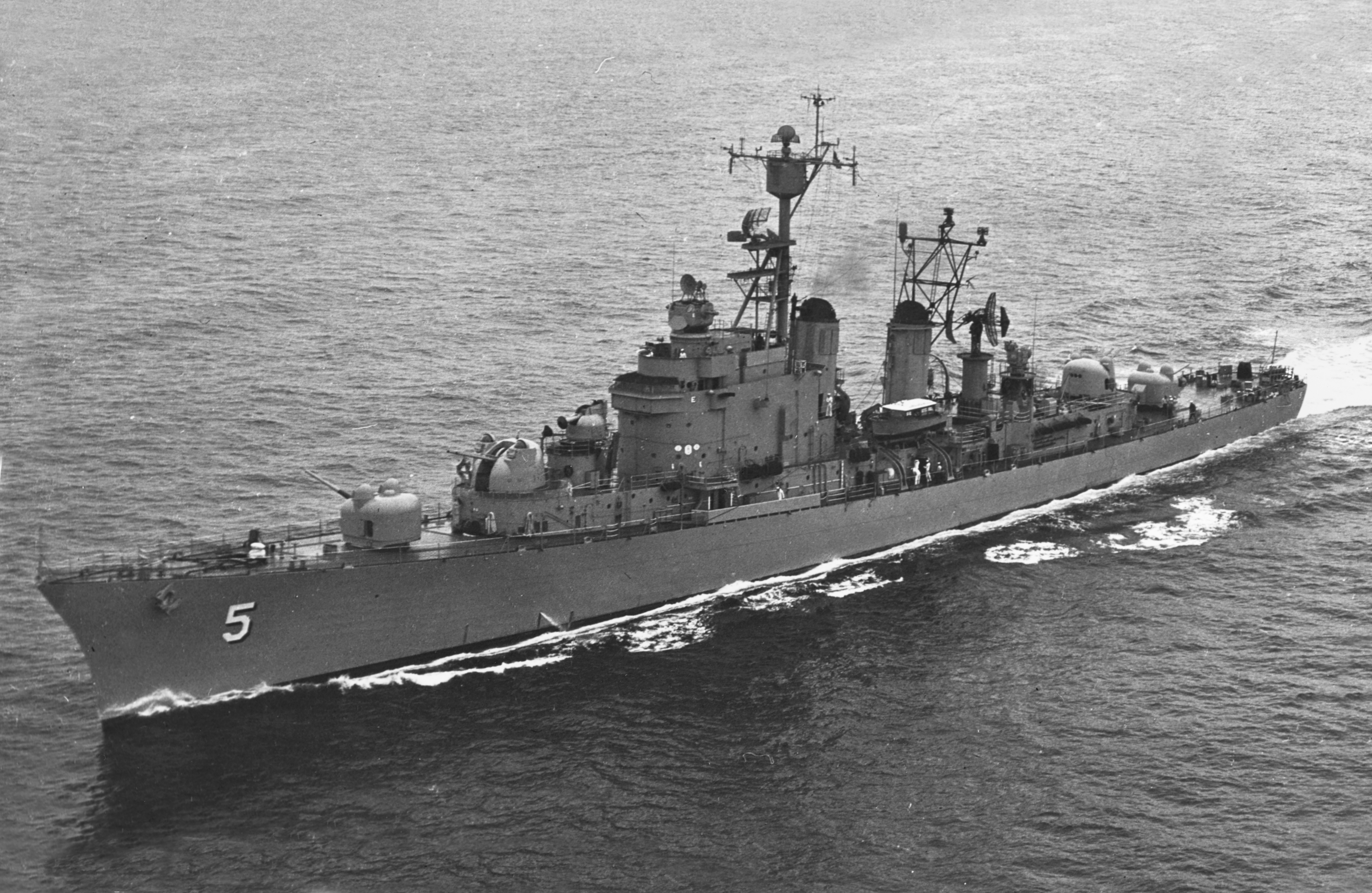
- USS Wilkinson (DL-5) in late 1950s

History

United States
- Namesake: Theodore Stark "Ping" Wilkinson
- Builder: Bethlehem Steel, Fore River Shipyard
- Laid down: 1 February 1950
- Launched: 23 April 1952
- Commissioned: 29 July 1954
- Decommissioned: 19 December 1969
- Stricken: 1 May 1974
- Fate: Sold for scrap 13 June 1975

General characteristics
- Class & type: Mitscher class destroyer
- Displacement: 4,730
- Length: 493 ft 0 in (150.27 m)
- Beam: 50 ft 0 in (15.24 m)
- Draft: 14 ft 0 in (4.27 m)
- Speed: 30 knots (56 km/h; 35 mph)
- Complement: 403
- Armament: 2 × 5 in (127 mm)/54 caliber Mark 42 guns; 4 × 3 in (76 mm)/50 caliber Mark 33 guns, later 3 in (76 mm)/70 caliber Mark 37 guns; 8 × 20 mm cannons; 2 × ASW rocket (Weapon Alfa); 1 × depth charge track

USS Wilkinson (DL-5) was a Mitscher class destroyer in the United States Navy. She was named for Vice Admiral Theodore Stark "Ping" Wilkinson USN (1888–1946).

Wilkinson was laid down by the Shipbuilding Division of the Bethlehem Steel Company at Quincy in Massachusetts on 1 February 1950; originally designated DD-930, she was reclassified as a destroyer leader and designated DL-5 on 9 February 1951, launched on 23 April 1952 by Lady Catherine Moore, the former Mrs. Theodore S. Wilkinson and commissioned on 3 August 1954.

== 1955–1959 ==
After shakedown training out of Guantánamo Bay, Cuba, and the usual post-shakedown availability, Wilkinson departed her home port, Newport, Rhode Island, on 21 February 1955—with Rear Admiral Arleigh Burke, Commander, Destroyer Force, Atlantic Fleet (and soon to become the Chief of Naval Operations) and members of his staff embarked—and carried Admiral Burke on an inspection tour that included visits to San Juan, Puerto Rico; St. Thomas, Virgin Islands; Guantánamo Bay and Havana, Cuba; and Key West, Fla. Upon her return, the destroyer leader became flagship for Commander, Destroyer Flotilla (DesFlot) 2, part of the Atlantic Fleet's antisubmarine forces. For three months thereafter, the ship conducted antisubmarine warfare (ASW) exercises.

On 11 July, Wilkinson—with 70 1st and 3d class NROTC midshipmen embarked—departed the east coast for a training cruise. During the ensuing voyage, the warship touched at Edinburgh, Scotland; Copenhagen, Denmark; and Guantánamo Bay, before returning to the United States on 2 September.

Wilkinson departed her home port on 24 October 1955 for air defense exercises in the Gulf of Mexico, with Commander, DesFlot 6 embarked. During that cruise, Wilkinson visited New Orleans and Havana, before she arrived back at Newport on 18 November. On 2 December, the ship entered the Boston Naval Shipyard for a five-month overhaul and the installation of improved 3 inch antiaircraft guns. After successfully completing her sea trials for her newly installed 3 inch / 70 caliber battery, Wilkinson conducted underway training out of Guantánamo Bay. She later visited Port-au-Prince, Haiti; Charleston, S.C.; and Norfolk, Va.; before taking part in large-scale ASW maneuvers in June. The ship's performance during the fiscal year 1956 earned her the Battle Efficiency "E."

In July 1956, Wilkinson departed Newport, bound for San Diego, Calif., and duty with the Pacific Fleet. En route to her new home port, the frigate visited Havana; Balboa, Canal Zone; and Buena Ventura, Colombia; before she became flagship of Commander, Destroyer Squadron (DesRon) 17—the first ship of her type assigned to the Pacific Fleet.

Between August 1956 and March 1957, Wilkinson operated locally out of San Diego and took part in ASW, air defense, and amphibious exercises. One highlight of that period occurred on 14 September 1956, when Wilkinson headed a veritable "armada" of 70 fighting ships during a 1st Fleet review off Long Beach, in what some called the largest naval parade on the west coast in 22 years.

During March and April 1957, Wilkinson operated in the Bering Sea and the Aleutians, visiting Kodiak and Dutch Harbor, Alaska, en route to her operating area. While steaming back to San Diego, she touched at Esquimalt, British Columbia; Seattle, Wash.; and San Francisco. Later, during part of May, Rear Admiral Chester Wood, Commander, Cruiser-Destroyer Force, Pacific Fleet, embarked in Wilkinson for air defense and ASW exercises. In June, the warship visited Portland, Oreg., to take part in the annual Rose Festival activities.

Wilkinson's home port was changed from San Diego to Long Beach in July 1957, and the destroyer leader entered the naval shipyard there in February 1958 for extensive modifications to her power plant. Released from the yard in September, the destroyer leader conducted underway training out of San Diego and operated locally for the remainder of 1958.

In January 1959, Wilkinson deployed on her first Western Pacific (WestPac) cruise, visiting Pearl Harbor, Hawaii; Subic Bay, Philippines; Buckner Bay, Okinawa; Kaohsiung, Taiwan; and the Japanese ports of Yokosuka and Kure, before she returned to Long Beach in March, embarking Commander, DesRon 19, upon arrival.

After again operating locally between April and October 1959, she participated in various exercises off the coast of California and in another 1st Fleet review. Wilkinson began her second WestPac deployment when she departed Long Beach in October. Coming under the operational control of Commander, 7th Fleet, Wilkinson took part in the Taiwan Strait patrol, ASW tactics, and various fast carrier task force operations in the Far East.

== 1960–1965 ==
Returning to Long Beach in March 1960, Wilkinson entered the naval shipyard there for a five-month overhaul. During that period of repairs and alterations, the ship's Combat Information Center (CIC) was enlarged and modified; and a long-range air search radar was added. In addition, a DASH (Destroyer Anti-Submarine Helicopter—sometimes sardonically nicknamed the "Down at Sea Helicopter") system—was installed. This change increased Wilkinson's ASW capacity severalfold.

Following Wilkinson's departure from the shipyard in August 1960, she carried out six weeks of underway training out of San Diego. She operated locally during October and November and, after a month-long leave and upkeep period in December, was deployed to WestPac for the third time, departing Long Beach on 3 January 1961.

En route to the Far East, Wilkinson—a unit of Destroyer Division 191—visited Pearl Harbor; Midway; and Apra Harbor, Guam. In mid-March 1961, she headed for the South China Sea where an increased American naval presence was required by the Laotian crisis. After operating with a fast carrier task group almost continuously well into the spring, the destroyer leader departed WestPac on 12 May and reached Long Beach on the 27th.

She entered the Long Beach Naval Shipyard in June for the installation of improved sonar equipment, a task that continued into mid-1962. After refresher training (during which there were two fires, resulting in two deaths), the warship operated in Puget Sound for technical evaluation of her new sonar system and then returned south, down the coast, to work with submarines in the southern California operating area.

Following further local operations, Wilkinson departed Long Beach on 17 June 1963 to return to the Atlantic Fleet. Calling at the Mexican ports of Acapulco and Salina Cruz en route, Wilkinson transited the Panama Canal on 29 June and arrived at Newport on 5 July.

Within two weeks, Wilkinson was underway for sonar evaluation that continued until 8 December. During the operation, the ship visited Bermuda and New York City. The frigate subsequently made another operational evaluation of the sonar system from 1 July 1964 to 20 May 1965, at which time she reported to Commander, Cruiser-Destroyer Force, Atlantic Fleet. During that time, the ship operated in the Gulf of Mexico and the Caribbean and along the continental shelf between Newport and New York. During the cruise, the ship visited Key West, Fla., and conducted type training in the Jacksonville, Fla., operating area while steaming back to Newport.

After a pre-overhaul tender availability, Wilkinson visited New York City for four days; off-loaded ammunition subsequently at Earle, N.J.; and proceeded to Boston for an overhaul which lasted until 5 February 1966.

== 1966–1970 ==
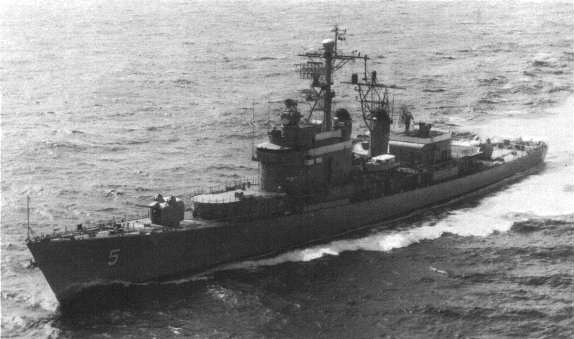
USS Wilkinson (DL-5) in the late 1960s.

After returning via Earle to Newport a little over a month later, Wilkinson sailed south to Cuban waters for refresher training—conducting those evolutions between 11 March and 28 April. While still at Guantanamo, on 8 April, the ship received orders at 03:10 to assist a burning freighter. Underway at 04:07, Wilkinson sped at flank speed to the scene of the disaster and, at 07:20, reached the stricken Norwegian passenger-freighter Viking Princess. A fire and rescue party from USCGC Cook Inlet (WAVP-384) had meanwhile boarded the blazing merchantman to fight her fires. At 08:09, Wilkinson began closing the Nationalist Chinese merchantman Chungking Victory to receive the surviving crew members of Viking Princess—a process completed by 09:14. The frigate took the 13 survivors back to Guantanamo where she arrived shortly before noon and disembarked the rescued mariners.

After departing Guantánamo Bay on 28 April, Wilkinson touched at San Juan, Puerto Rico, and reached Newport on 2 May. She remained in port until departing on the last day of the month, bound for Boston and an availability. During the ensuing overhaul, the ship received a number of repairs and alterations, including the final installation of new sonar equipment then being evaluated by the Navy. Briefly departing Boston on 15 August and again on 30 August, the frigate conducted sea trials and tested her sonar—during cruises lasting but a day or two—before she completed her availability and sailed for Newport on 31 August, reaching her home port the following day.

For the remainder of 1966, Wilkinson remained in port at Newport except for three periods of independent steaming exercises (ISEs)—from 6 to 9 September, from 23 to 26 September, and from 2 to 5 December. Underway on 15 January 1967, Wilkinson headed south to Argentine waters, subsequently taking part in the Argentinian naval review at Mar del Plata from 4 to 8 February on the occasion of the celebrations commemorating the sesquicentennial of Argentina's independence.

Returning to Newport on 5 March, Wilkinson then proceeded to the Bethlehem Steel Shipyard at East Boston, Mass., where she received a data acquisition system for her sonar equipment. She returned—via Stamford, Conn., where she participated in Veteran's Day memorial services—to Newport on 4 May.

Later that month, Wilkinson sailed for Montreal, Canada, where she served as part of the United States exhibit during "United States Week," from 21 to 28 May, at the world's fair, Expo 67. Highlighting Wilkinson's stay at Montreal was a surprise visit to the exposition by President Lyndon B. Johnson. During the ceremonies at the United States exhibit, Wilkinson men served as Presidential Honor Guard.

Returning to Newport on 1 June, Wilkinson continued further sonar evaluations into the summer and fall months of 1967, operating primarily out of Newport but also east of the Bahamas. Between her periods at sea were times in port for tender availabilities and type training in the Narragansett Bay operating area.

The ship put into Port Everglades to take on fuel on 3 October and was standing back out on the 5th when a weak cleat snapped while the motor whaleboat was being secured for sea. The whiplash of the line struck a sailor, injuring both of his legs and requiring immediate medical attention beyond that which the ship could provide. Wilkinson immediately headed back to Port Everglades at flank speed, radioing ahead for a boat to pick up the injured seaman. A torpedo retriever boat, sent put by the Naval Ordnance Laboratory and Test Facility, took the man on board to a waiting ambulance at pierside. The seaman was then taken to Homestead Air Force Base hospital where he was treated for fractures of both legs.

After the incident, Wilkinson returned to sea and conducted further sonar tests—in company with Grouper (AGSS-214)—before the frigate visited Freeport, Grand Bahama, from 11 to 13 October. Proceeding back to Newport soon thereafter, Wilkinson reached her home port on the 25th but soon headed south for repairs at the Norfolk Naval Shipyard. She returned to her home port on 21 December.

Beginning 1968 in-port at Newport, Wilkinson spent much of the rest of the year conducting further technical evaluation of sonar equipment in the Bahamas, interspersed with type training in the Mayport operating area and in-port periods at Newport. After a pre-overhaul period of availability alongside Yosemite (AD-19), Wilkinson entered the Boston Naval Shipyard on 13 September 1968 for her regular overhaul that rounded out the year and lasted into June 1969.

Following her sea trials, Wilkinson got underway for Narragansett Bay for sonar tests, before she set course for Earle, N.J., to load ammunition in preparation for refresher training. Late in July, the frigate visited New York City from 25 to 28 July before she shifted to Newport on the latter date. She remained in her home port for almost a month, conducting a dependents' cruise in Narragansett Bay operating areas on the 22 August. It was during that cruise that the ship's commanding officer announced that Wilkinson was to be decommissioned as part of a cut back in military expenses.

== Fate ==
With the cancellation of all her previous schedules, Wilkinson shifted to the Boston Navy Yard's South Boston Annex to commence inactivation on 3 September. Shifting to the Naval Inactive Ship Facility at Philadelphia on the 22d, Wilkinson was decommissioned on 19 December 1969 and placed in reserve.

Wilkinson was stricken from the Naval Vessel Register on 1 May 1974 and sold for scrap to Luria Brothers and Company, Incorporated, of Philadelphia in Pennsylvania on 13 June 1975.

As of 2012, no other ships in the United States Navy have borne this name.
