= Mitscher-class destroyer =

Destroyer class of the US Navy

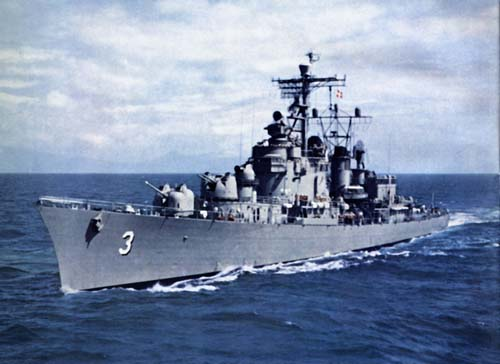
- USS John S. McCain underway in early 1960s

Class overview
- Name: Mitscher class
- Builders: Bath Iron Works, Bath, Maine; Bethlehem Steel, Fore River Shipyard
- Operators: United States Navy
- Preceded by: Norfolk class
- Succeeded by: Forrest Sherman class
- Built: 1949–1954
- In commission: 1953–1978
- Completed: 4
- Retired: 4

General characteristics
- Type: Destroyer leader
- Displacement: 3,642 tons standard; 4,855 full load
- Length: 490 ft (150 m)
- Beam: 47.5 ft (14.5 m)
- Draft: 14.7 ft (4.5 m)
- Propulsion: 2 shaft; geared steam turbines; 4 boilers; 80,000 shp (60,000 kW)
- Speed: 30 knots (56 km/h; 35 mph)
- Range: 4,500 nmi (8,300 km; 5,200 mi) at 20 kn (37 km/h; 23 mph)
- Complement: Officer: 28; Enlisted: 345
- Armament: 2 × 5 in (127 mm) guns; 4 × 3 in (76 mm) guns; 8 × 20 mm guns; 4 × 21-inch (533 mm) torpedo tubes; 2 × Weapon Alpha ASW rocket launcher; 1 × depth charge rack

The Mitscher-class destroyer was an experimental destroyer class of four ships that were built for the United States Navy shortly after World War II. Considerably larger than all previous destroyers, but smaller than their immediate predecessor, the experimental Norfolk, they would have been the first post-war destroyer class had they not been reclassified during construction as destroyer leaders (DL). Commissioned in 1953–1954, two of the class served until 1969, and were scrapped in the 1970s. The other two were converted into guided missile destroyers (DDG), served until 1978, and were sold for scrap by 1980.

== Description ==
All four Mitscher-class ships were designed under project SCB 5 and ordered 3 August 1948. They were named for admirals of the Second World War. Each ship displaced 3,331 tons light, 3,642 tons standard and 4,855 tons under full load with a length of 494 feet (151 m), a 50-foot (15 m) beam and a 26-foot (8 m) draft.

Beyond that, each ship had a different loadout of propulsion and other systems so as to determine the best course of action for future destroyer design.

The Mitscher class would become the winner in internal Navy debates over competing designs, even as an early concept in 1945. With their development the CL-154 class anti aircraft cruisers would be canceled, and no further Norfolks would be built; in both cases the decisions were made on cost-effectiveness grounds.

In the early 1960s, the Mitscher class underwent modernization through a Class Improvement Program (CIP), which included the replacement of the boilers on the first two ships of the class.

=== DDG conversions ===
The first two ships, Mitscher and John S. McCain, were converted into guided missile destroyers under SCB 241 in the mid-1960s. They were redesignated as DDG-35 and DDG-36, respectively.

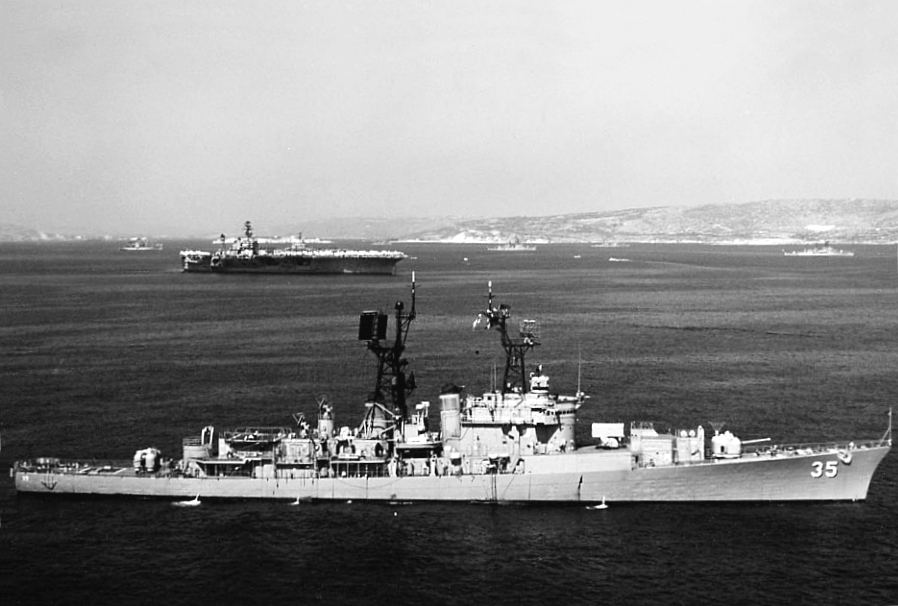
USS Mitscher (DDG-35) after her conversion to a guided missile destroyer, 1971.

== Ships in class ==
Ships of the Mitscher destroyer class
Name	Hull no.	Builder	Laid down	Launched	Commissioned	Decommissioned	Fate	Ref
Mitscher	DL-2	Bath Iron Works	3 October 1949	26 January 1952	15 May 1953	1 June 1978	Disposed of, sold by Defense Reutilization and Marketing Service (DRMS) for scrapping, 1 August 1980	
John S. McCain	DL-3	Bath Iron Works	24 October 1949	12 July 1952	12 October 1953	29 April 1978	Disposed of, sold by Defense Reutilization and Marketing Service (DRMS) for scrapping, 13 December 1979	
Willis A. Lee	DL-4	Bethlehem Steel, Fore River Shipyard	1 November 1949	26 January 1952	5 October 1954	19 December 1969	Disposed of, sold by Defense Reutilization and Marketing Service (DRMS) for scrapping, 1 June 1973	
Wilkinson	DL-5	Bethlehem Steel, Fore River Shipyard	1 February 1950	23 April 1952	29 July 1954	19 December 1969	Disposed of, sold by Defense Reutilization and Marketing Service (DRMS) for scrapping, 1 June 1975	

== See also ==
- List of United States Navy destroyer leaders
