= USS John S. McCain (DL-3) =

Mitscher-class destroyer leader in the United States Navy

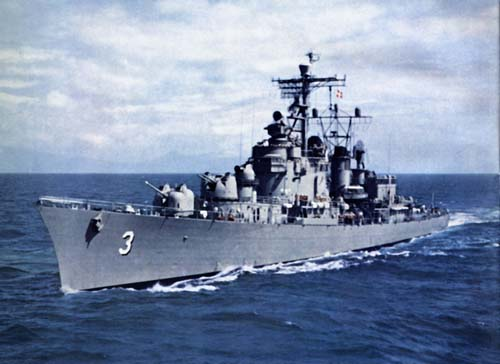

History

United States
- Namesake: John S. McCain, Sr.
- Builder: Bath Iron Works
- Laid down: 24 October 1949
- Launched: 12 July 1952
- Acquired: 23 September 1953
- Commissioned: 12 October 1953
- Decommissioned: 29 April 1978
- Reclassified: DDG-36, 15 March 1967
- Stricken: 29 April 1978
- Motto: DL-3, Crusader for Peace; DDG-36, Praestate – "Excel"
- Fate: Sold for scrap, Jan 1980

General characteristics
- Class & type: Mitscher-class destroyer
- Displacement: 3,675 tons
- Length: 493 ft (150.3 m)
- Beam: 50 ft (15.2 m)
- Draft: 13 ft 10 in (4.2 m)
- Speed: over 30 knots (56 km/h; 35 mph)
- Complement: 403
- Armament: 2 × 1 5"/54 cal, 2 × 2 3"/70 caliber guns, 4 21 in (533 mm) torpedo tubes, 1 ASROC, 1 depth charge track, as built, and before conversion to a DDG

USS John S. McCain (DL-3/DDG-36) was the second Mitscher-class destroyer leader in the United States Navy. Commissioned in 1953, she was later converted into a guided missile destroyer and served until 1978. She was sold for scrap in 1979.

== Construction and commissioning ==
The ship was launched by Bath Iron Works Corporation, Bath, Maine, on 12 July 1952. Originally designated DD-928 she was reclassified in 1951 as a destroyer leader. She was sponsored by Roberta McCain, the daughter-in-law of Admiral John S. McCain, Sr. (born 1884), and commissioned on 12 October 1953 at the Boston Naval Shipyard.

== History ==
USS John S. McCain spent her first year of commissioned service undergoing sea trials and shakedown training in the Atlantic Ocean and Caribbean Sea. One of the Mitscher class of large and fast destroyer leaders, she carried the new guided-missile armament, and she embodied new ideas in hull design and construction. This warship arrived at Norfolk on 19 May 1955 to begin service with the Operational Development Force in testing new equipment and tactics. She operated out of Norfolk until 5 November 1956, when she steamed from Hampton Roads bound for the Panama Canal and San Diego, California. After her arrival on 4 December 1956, she spent five months on maneuvers in the Pacific Ocean off California.

The destroyer sailed for her first Far East cruise on 11 April 1957, and after a visit to Australia, she joined the Formosa (now called Taiwan) Patrol, helping to deter a military clash between Nationalist and Communist Chinese forces. She returned from this important duty to San Diego on 29 September 1957.

John S. McCain steamed to her new homeport, Pearl Harbor, Hawaii, in early 1958, and she took part in fleet manoeuvres and antisubmarine training for the next eight months. In early September, the ship deployed to the Formosa-South China Sea area to help the Seventh Fleet deter a possible Communist invasion of Quemoy and Matsu Islands. She remained in this region until returning to Pearl Harbor on 1 March 1959.

This warship made her third deployment to the Far East in the fall of 1959, departing on 8 September 1959 and moving directly to the coast of Southeast Asia. During October, she was off Calcutta, India, carrying medicines and donating food and money to flood victims. In January 1960, this versatile ship rescued the entire 41-man crew of Japanese freighter Shinwa Maru during a storm in the South China Sea. Returning to Pearl Harbor on 25 February, she began a well-earned period of overhaul and shipboard training.

John S. McCain departed on 7 March 1961 for another deployment with Seventh Fleet, spending six months off Laos and Vietnam. She resumed operations in Hawaiian waters after her return to Pearl Harbor on 25 September. With the resumption of atmospheric nuclear testing by the Soviet Union some months later, the United States went ahead with plans for her own series of Pacific tests, and John S. McCain steamed to Johnston Island on 27 April 1962 to take part in the experiments. For the next six months she operated between Hawaii and Johnston Island, departing for her next cruise to the Far East on 28 November 1962. There she returned to patrol duties in the South China Sea and Gulf of Tonkin, aiding the South Vietnamese government in its fight against the Viet Cong. She also took part in Formosa Patrol in the Straits before returning to Pearl Harbor on 16 June 1963. Antisubmarine warfare exercises followed, and the ship got underway again on 23 March 1964 for operations with a hunter-killer group in Japanese and Philippine waters. During this cruise she took part in exercises with ships from other SEATO nations as well as units of the 7th Fleet. John S. McCain returned to Pearl Harbor on 11 August. She operated in Hawaiian waters until the spring of 1965. The destroyer returned to Pearl Harbor, and then sailed on a six-month deployment in the western Pacific. In the fall, John S. McCain steamed off South Vietnam. On 24 November 1965 she shelled Viet Cong positions. Two days later she sailed to Hong Kong and ended the year in Japan. After further operations in the Far East early in 1966, John S. McCain returned to the East Coast of the United States.

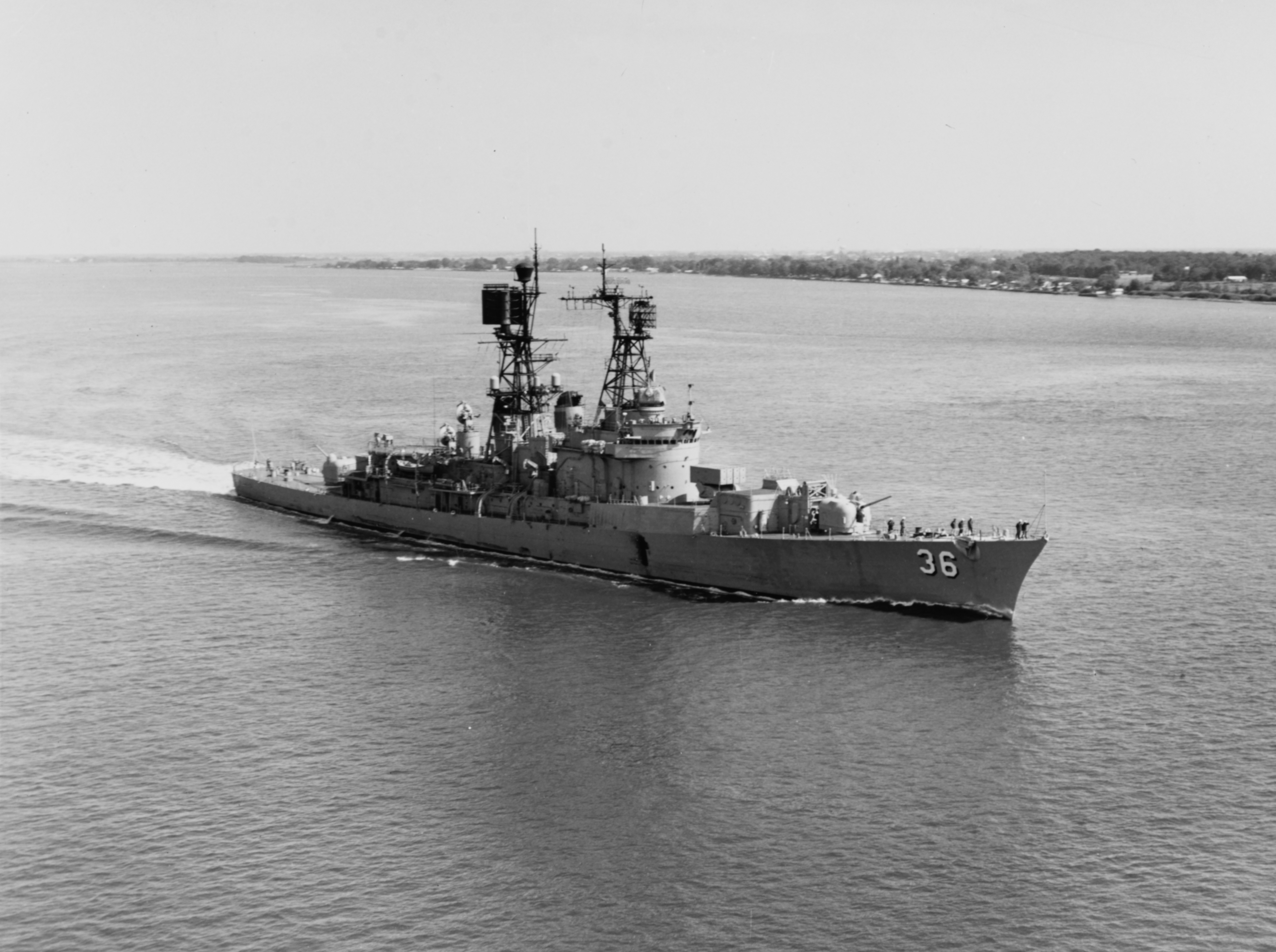
John S. McCain after her conversion to a guided missile destroyer, 1969

On 24 June 1966, John S. McCain was decommissioned for modernisation at the Philadelphia Naval Shipyard. Upon recommissioning on 6 September 1969, she was redesignated DDG-36, a guided missile destroyer.

== Fate ==
USS John S. McCain was decommissioned and stricken from the Naval Vessel Register on 29–30 April 1978, and sold for scrap on 13 December 1979. Her entire class of guided missile destroyers was rather abruptly retired from service because of technical problems with their steam power plants.
