= USS Mitscher (DL-2) =

US Navy destroyer (1953–1978)

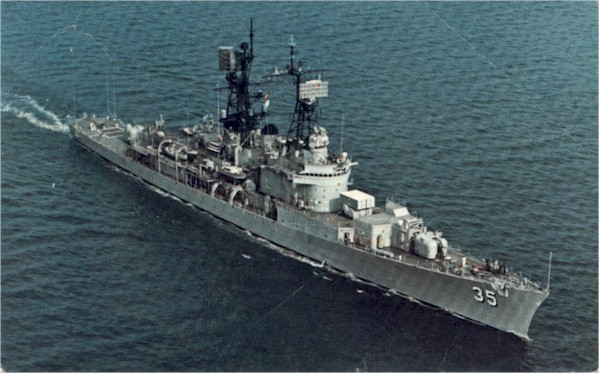
- USS Mitscher (DDG-35) in the 1970s

History

United States
- Name: Mitscher
- Namesake: Marc "Pete" Mitscher
- Builder: Bath Iron Works
- Laid down: 3 October 1949
- Launched: 26 January 1952
- Acquired: 8 May 1953
- Commissioned: 15 May 1953
- Decommissioned: 1 June 1978
- Reclassified: DDG-35
- Stricken: 1 June 1978
- Motto: Audete Imperio
- Fate: Sold for scrap, July 1980

General characteristics
- Class & type: Mitscher class destroyer
- Displacement: 4,271 tons (std) – 5,281 tons (full)
- Length: 493 ft (150 m) o.a.
- Beam: 49 ft 9 1/4 in (15.170 m)
- Draft: 20 ft 11 3/8 in (6.385 m)
- Propulsion: (4) 1,200 psi Foster Wheeler boilers, (2) GE steam propulsion turbines, (2) shafts, 60,000 combined shaft horsepower (44.742 MW)
- Speed: 34 knots (63 km/h; 39 mph)
- Range: 4,000 nm @ 20 knots (7,400 km @ 37 km/h)
- Complement: 337
- Armament: (1) Mk 13 Tartar SAM system (40 missiles), (2) Mk 42 5"/54 (127 mm/54) cal gun mounts, (1) Mk 16 ASROC launcher w/ reloads, (6) Mk 32 12.75" (324 mm) torpedo tubes (3 tubes per launcher)
- Aircraft carried: None

USS Mitscher (DL-2/DDG-35), named for Admiral Marc "Pete" Mitscher USN (1887–1947), was the lead ship of her class of destroyer leaders of the United States Navy. Commissioned in 1953, she was later converted to a guided missile destroyer, and served until 1978. She was sold for scrap in 1980.

== Construction and commissioning ==
Originally designated DD-927, she was laid down by the Bath Iron Works Corporation at Bath, Maine on 3 October 1949, reclassified as a destroyer leader and designated DL-2 on 2 February 1951, launched on 26 January 1952 by Mrs. Marc A. Mitscher, widow of Admiral Mitscher and commissioned on 15 May 1953.

== Service ==
Mitscher was initially homeported in Newport, R.I., and became the operational flagship for Commander Destroyer Flotilla Two. After initial shakedown exercises off Cuba, Mitscher returned to Boston for further modification, followed by another shakedown cruise to Guantanamo Bay, ending 31 August 1954. Homeported thereafter at Newport, R.I., she conducted exercises off the east coast until 3 January 1956, when she sailed on a good-will cruise to England, Germany, and France, returning to Rhode Island 10 February. For the next 5 years, she continued her east coast operations, deploying annually either to the northern or eastern Atlantic for NATO exercises.

In 1955, Mitscher cruised the Caribbean with Commander Destroyer Force, US Atlantic Fleet, embarked. In 1958, President Eisenhower broke his personal flag in Mitscher during the America's Cup Challenge Races off Newport. Mitscher journeyed to South America on a four-month cruise in 1959, and subsequently cruised to Northern Europe for extended NATO Exercises.

In November 1960, the ship's homeport was shifted to Naval Station Charleston, SC, where she became the operational flagship of Commander Destroyer Flotilla Six. On 9 February 1961, she departed her new homeport, and steamed to the Mediterranean for her first 6-month tour with the U.S. 6th Fleet. Early in 1961, Mitscher deployed with the Sixth Fleet. During this cruise, Mitscher was flagship for Admiral Anderson, Commander Sixth Fleet. The ship was again transferred to Newport, Rhode Island, in 1962, where she again became the flagship of Commander Cruiser Destroyer Flotilla Two. Such deployments over the next 4 years involved her in further NATO exercises as well as 6th Fleet exercises. Spring 1964, departed Newport, Rhode Island, for 6-month tour with 6th Fleet. In August 1964, while in the Mediterranean, she stood off Cyprus to aid in the evacuation of American nationals, and then steamed through the Suez Canal to patrol the Red Sea and the Persian Gulf. Returned to Mediterranean for 4-month tour with U.S. 6th Fleet in 1965, returned to Newport, Rhode Island, December 1965.

On 2 March 1966, Mitscher departed Newport for the Philadelphia Naval Shipyard. There, she was converted to a guided missile destroyer at between 18 March 1966 and 29 June 1968 and designated DDG-35. In late August 1970, Mitscher departed Norfolk for Mediterranean operations with COMDESRON One Four aboard. Her next deployment was in July 1971 as a member of Destroyer Squadron Twenty-Six, the "Mod Squad". Mitscher entered the Norfolk Naval Shipyard in March 1972 for overhaul.

== Decommissioning and disposal ==
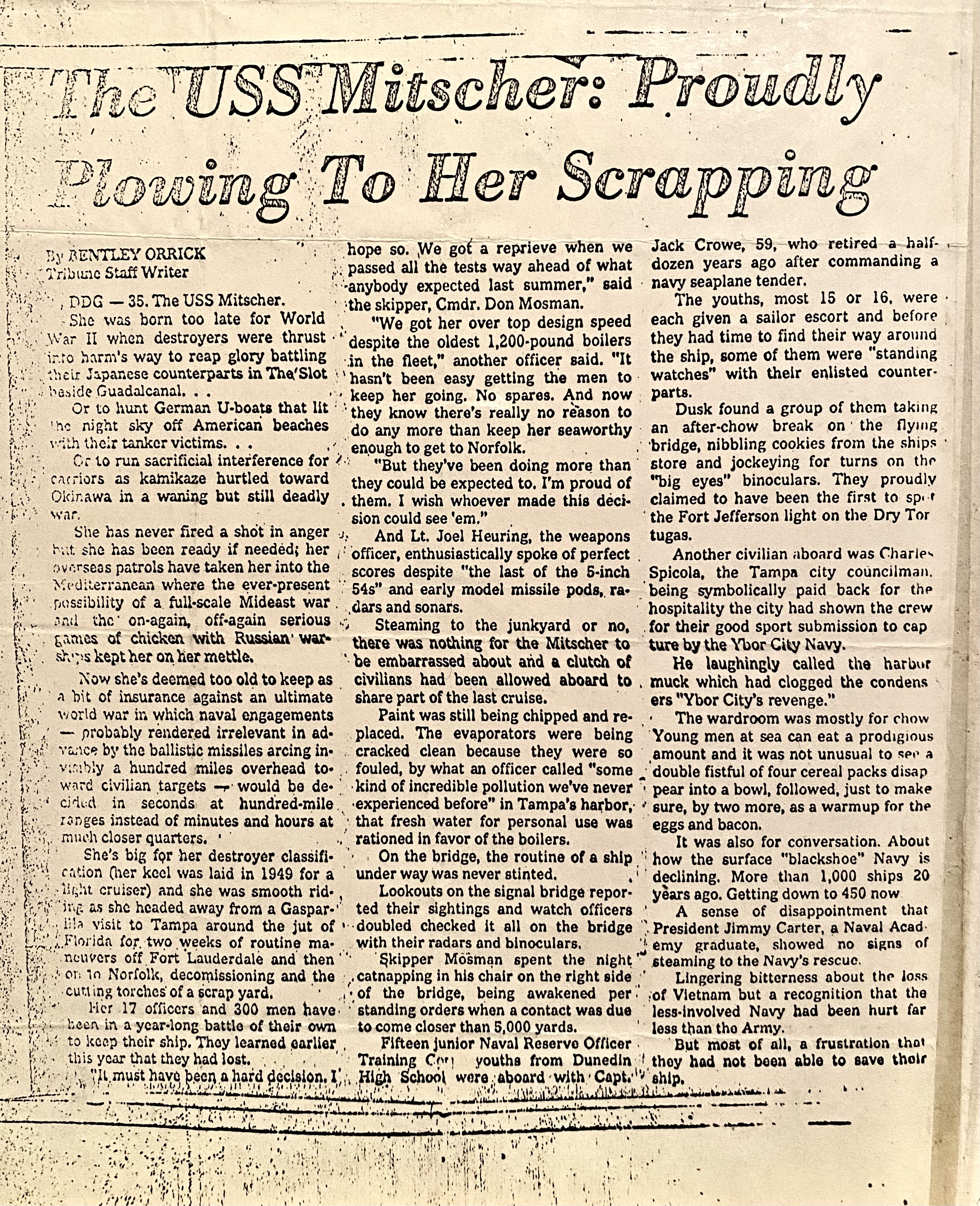
Tampa Tribune article on the Mitscher's scrapping

Mitscher was decommissioned and stricken from the Naval Vessel Register on 1 June 1978, and sold for scrap in July 1980.

== Gallery ==
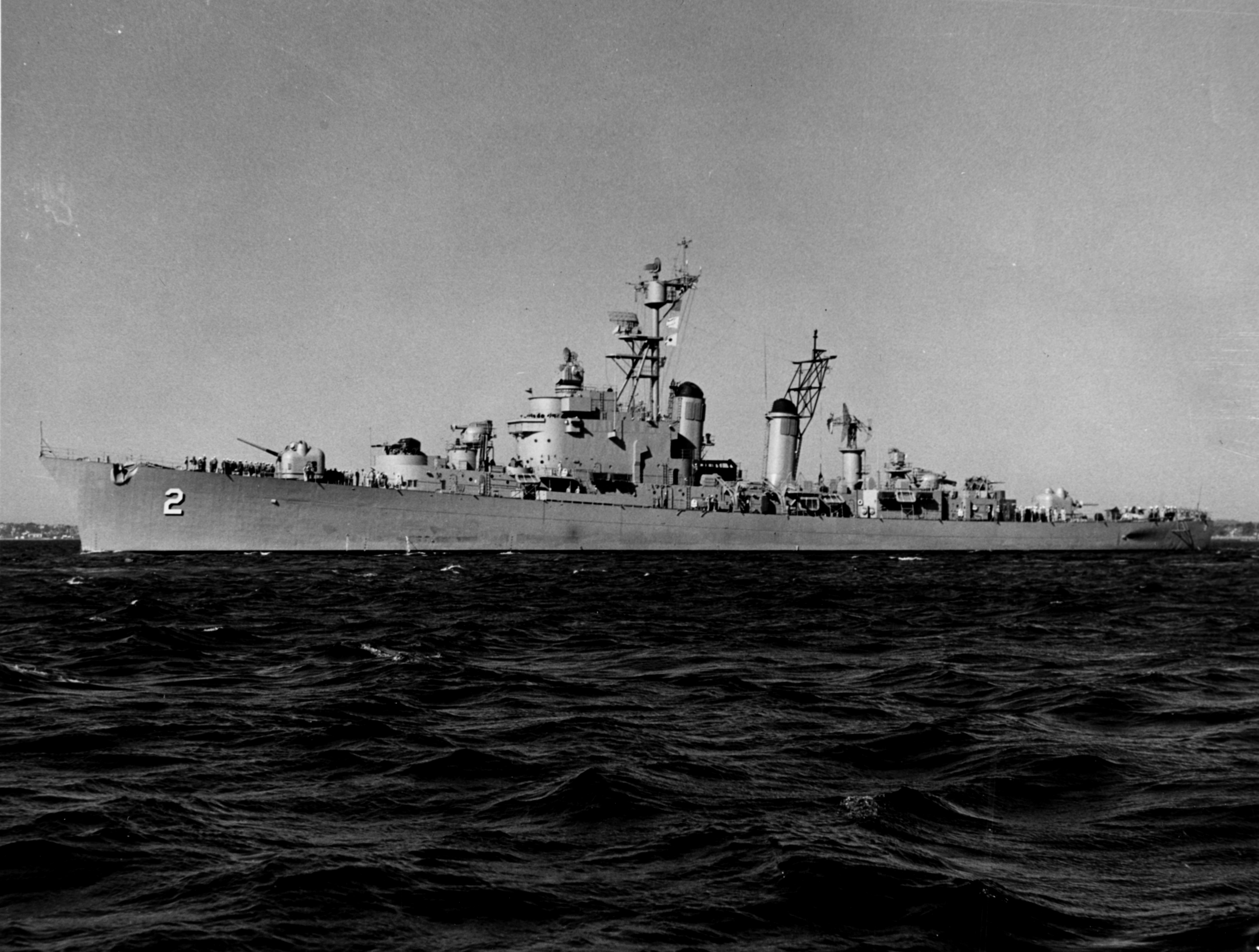
USS Mitscher (DL-2), in 1953.

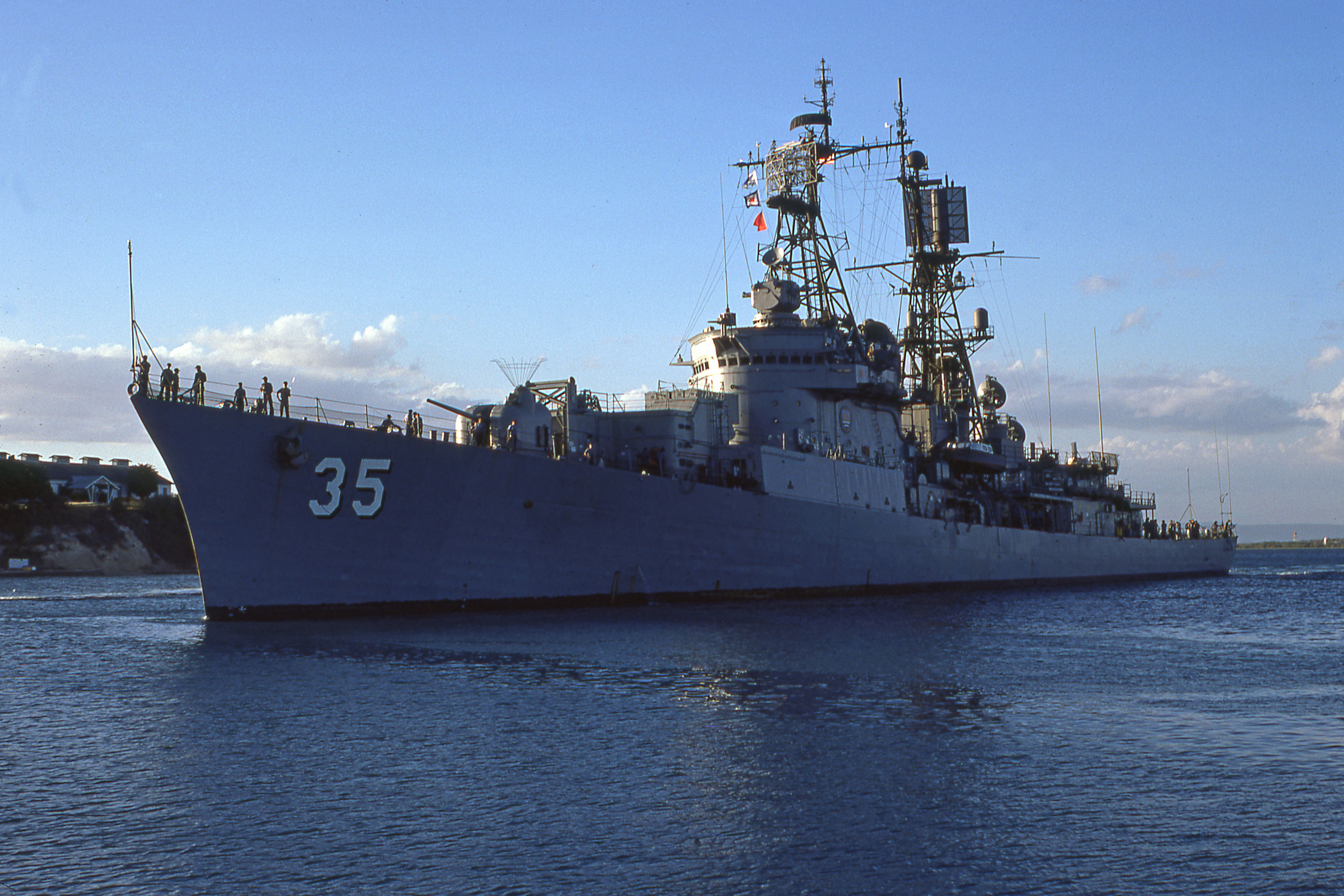
USS Mitscher (DDG-35) entering Guantanamo Bay Naval Base in January 1975

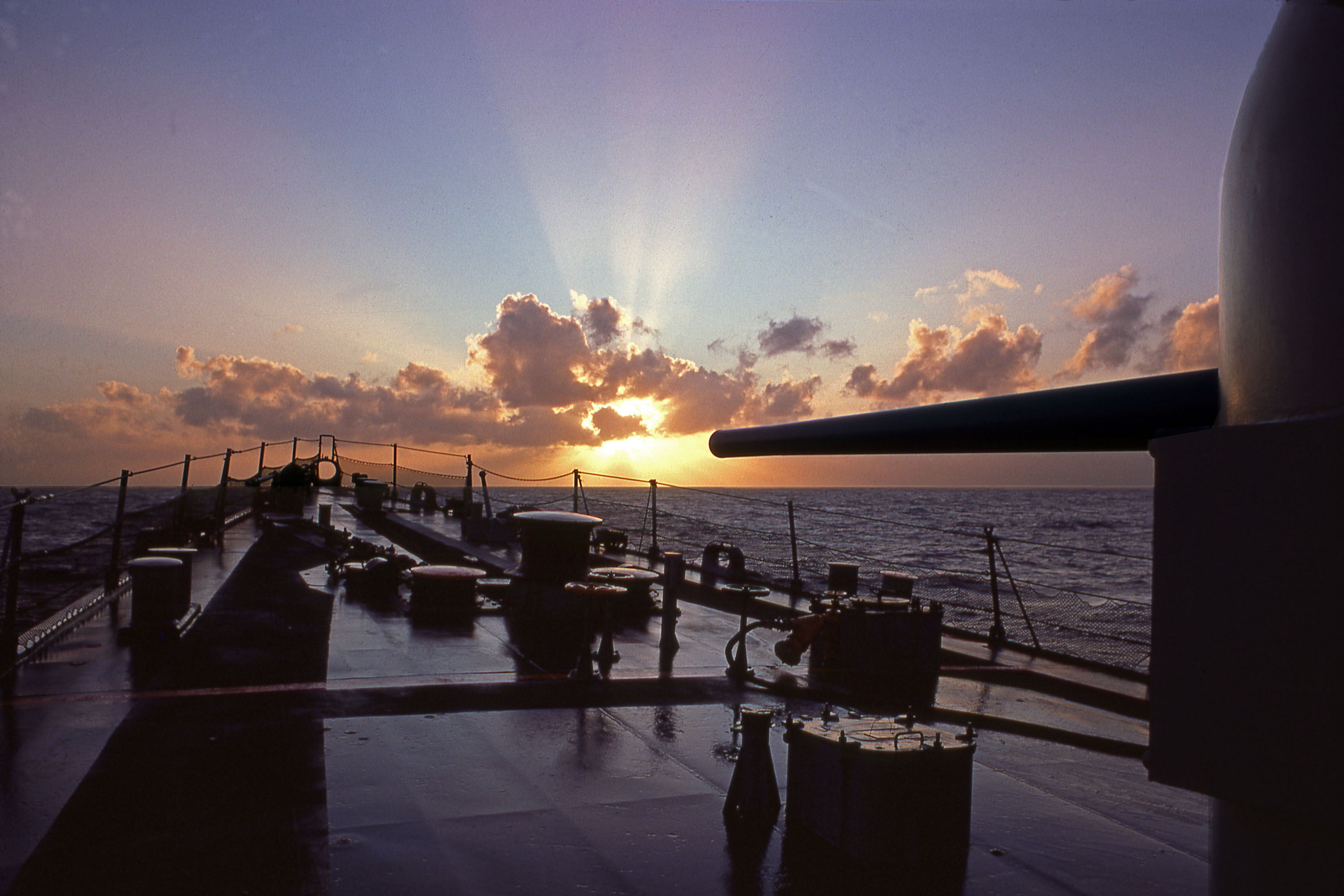
Sunrise on the USS Mitscher (DDG-35) north of Puerto Rico. January 1975

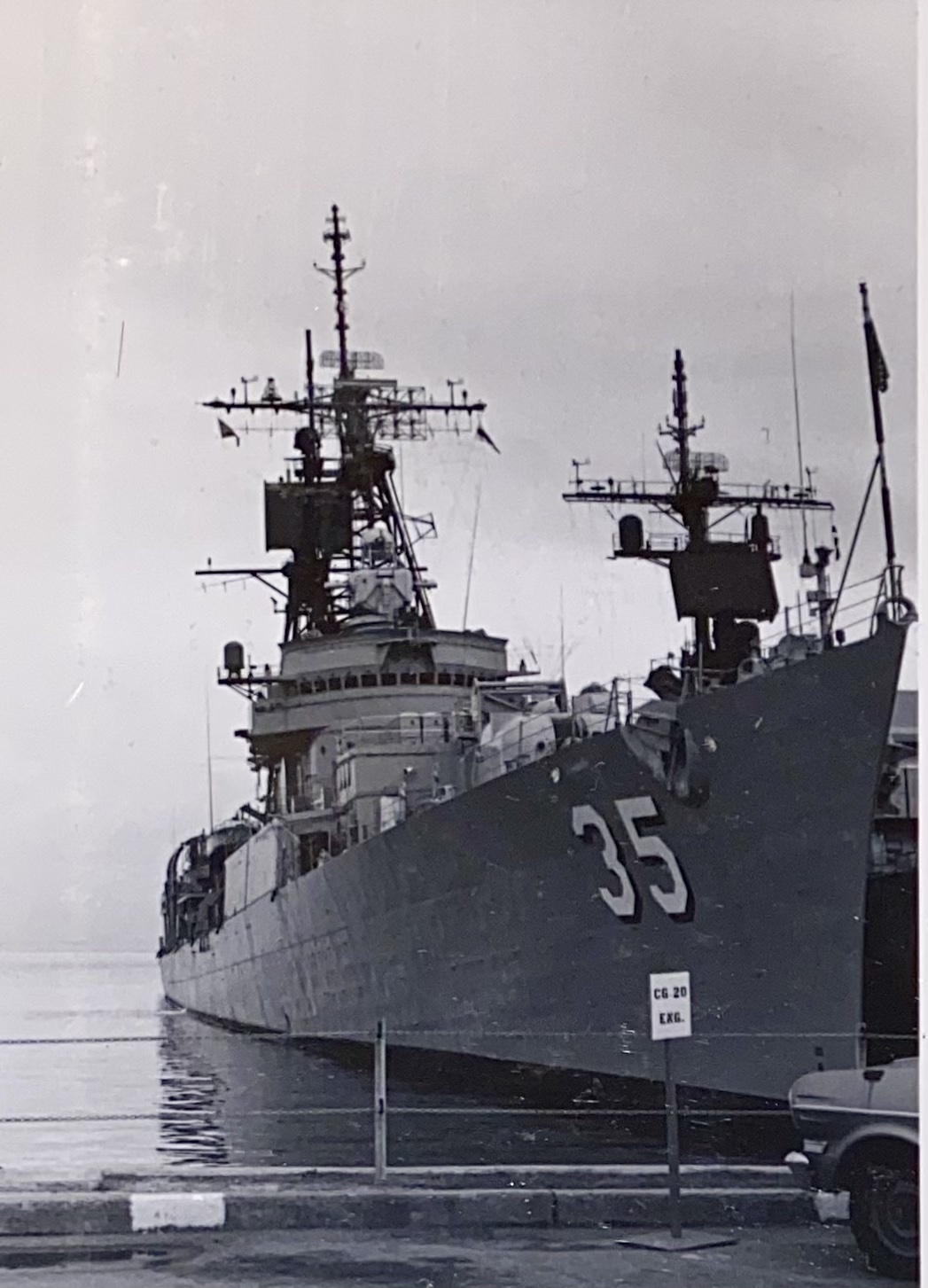
USS Mitscher (DDG-35) in port, 1977

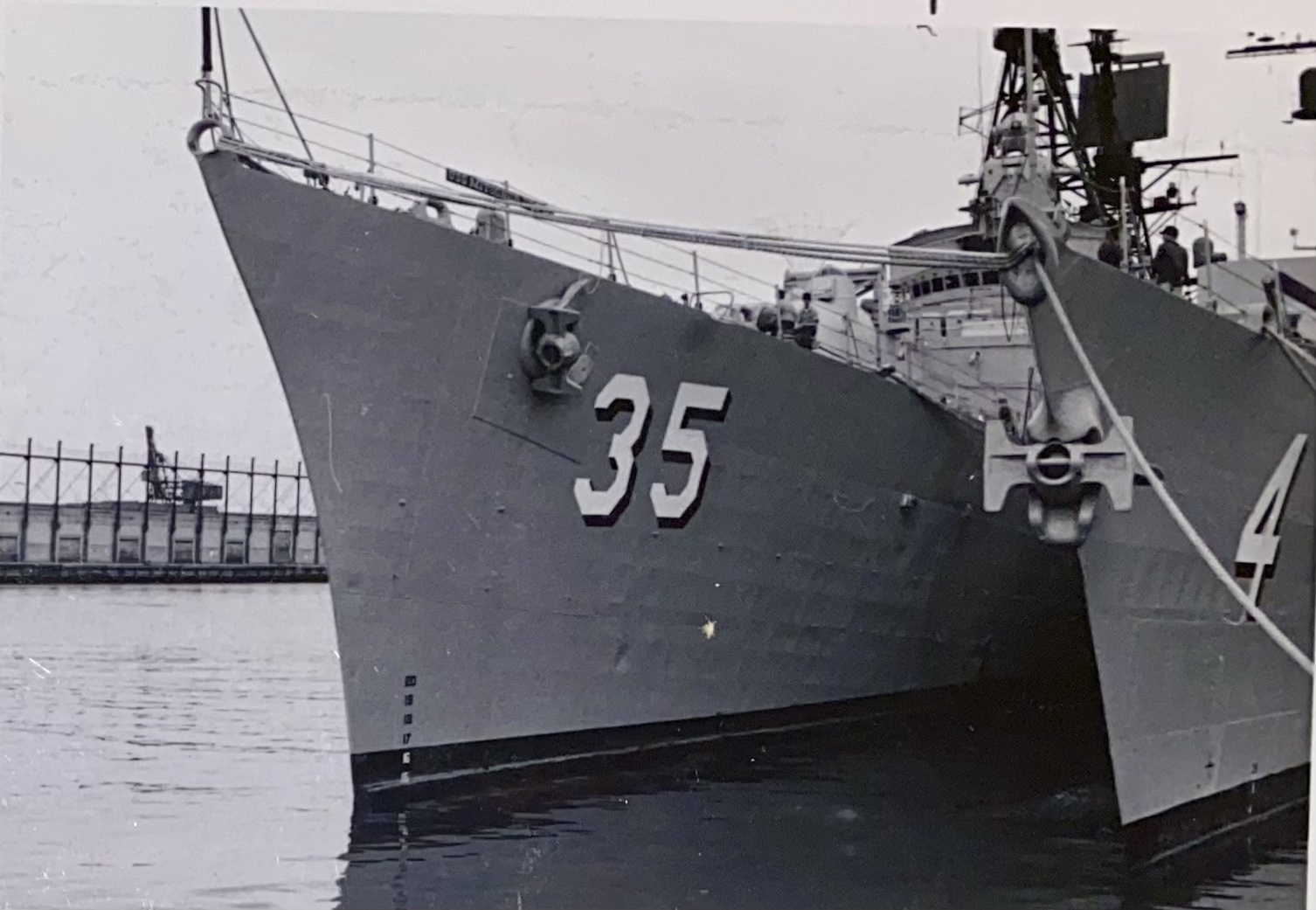
USS Mitscher (DDG-35) in port alongside USS Talbot (FFG-4), 1977

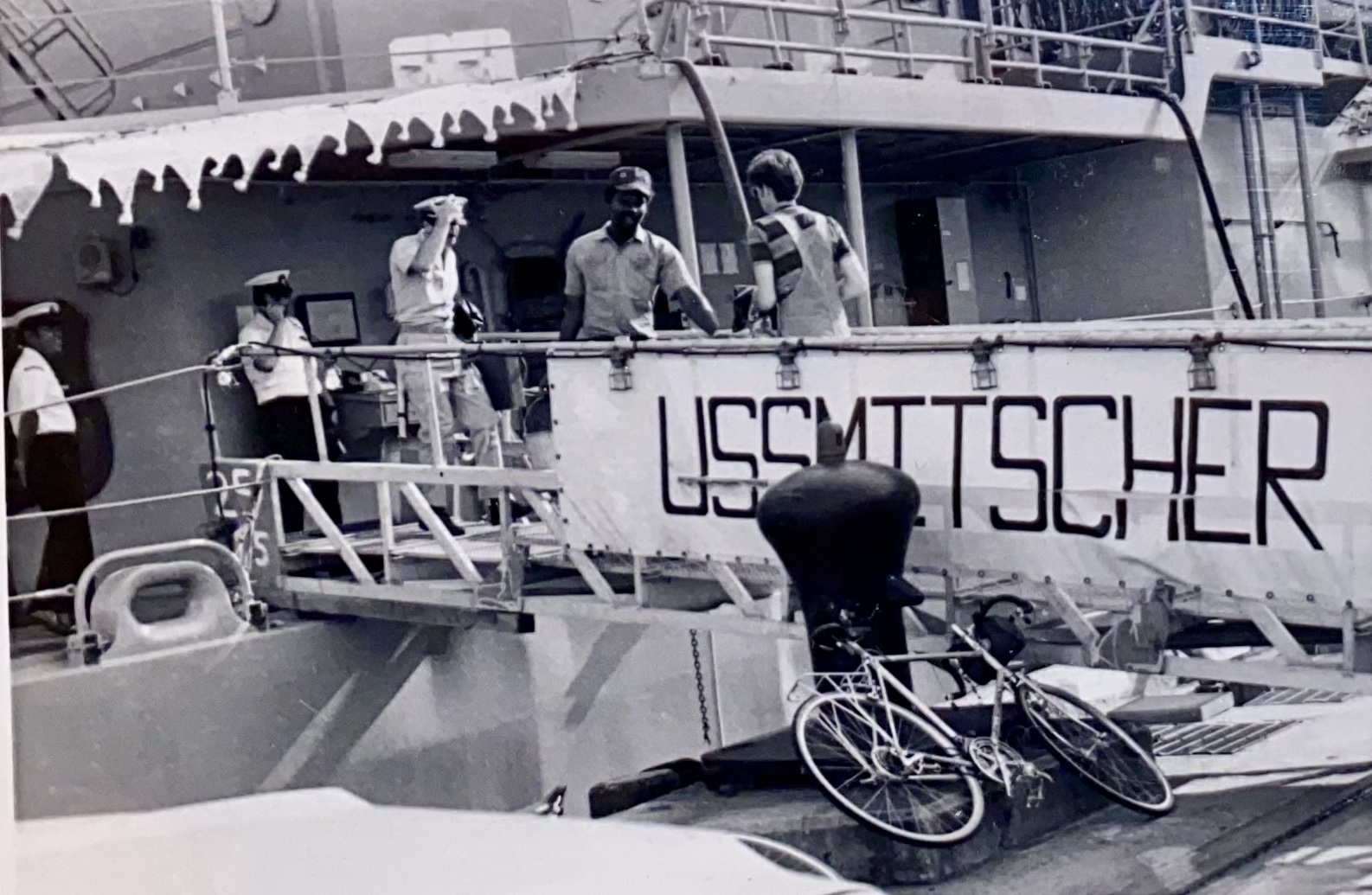
USS Mitscher's brow while in port, 1977
