= Destroyer leader =

US Navy designation for large destroyers

Destroyer leader (DL) was the United States Navy's designation for large destroyers from 9 February 1951 through the early years of the Cold War. United States ships with hull classification symbol DL were officially frigates from 1 January 1955 until 1975. The smaller destroyer leaders were reclassified as destroyers and the larger as cruisers by the United States Navy 1975 ship reclassification so destroyer escorts could be reclassified as frigates (FF) in conformance with international usage of the term.

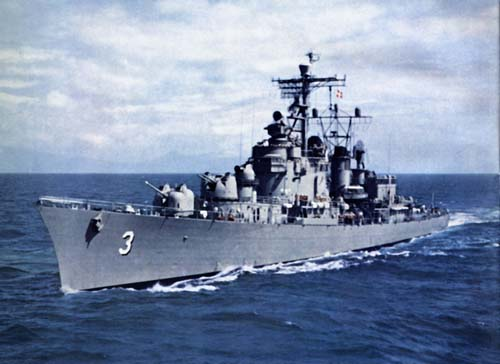
Destroyer leader USS John S. McCain with 3-inch/70 Mark 26 gun and Weapon Alpha visible abaft the forward 5-inch/54 Mark 42 gun.

== Background ==
By the end of World War I the destroyers intended to screen formations of battleships had evolved to a displacement of approximately 1,100 tons armed with four 4-inch (10 cm) guns and six or more torpedoes. Italy had built three Mirabello-class esploratori (scout cruisers) approximately 70% larger than contemporary destroyers. The Washington Naval Treaty encouraged the United Kingdom's satisfaction with its traditional fleet of V and W-class destroyers and the United States' contentment with the similar Wickes and Clemson-class destroyers, while the signatories with smaller fleets explored alternative warship configurations between the classical definitions of destroyer and cruiser. Italy launched three more Leone-class esploratori and France responded with six Chacal-class contre-torpilleur super destroyers. Japan launched the minimum light cruiser Yūbari followed by the Fubuki-class "Special Type destroyers" (特型駆逐艦, Toku-gata Kuchikukan) with endurance to escort the Kido Butai mobile force of aircraft carriers over the wide reaches of the Pacific.

Germany built similarly enlarged Zerstörer when it commenced naval rearmament. With the exception of the Tribal class and a few flotilla leaders, most British and American destroyers built between the world wars were smaller than contemporary Axis destroyers; but as the battleships for which the smaller destroyers had been designed as escorts faded into restricted roles in the combat experience of World War II, United States destroyer displacement increased to 2100 tons, 2200 tons, and 2400 tons to support Fast Carrier Task Force operations.

== Description ==
As the United States Navy thinned its wartime fleet following World War II, the smaller destroyers were discarded until only those over 2,000 tons remained in active service. Naval architects had a few years to evaluate captured ships and combat experience before there was any need for more warships. With large inventories of destroyers and cruisers, new surface warship designs explored placing high-efficiency boilers in hulls of intermediate size. The first destroyer leader USS Norfolk was authorized in 1948 and laid down in 1949 as an anti-submarine hunter-killer cruiser based on the Atlanta-class anti-aircraft cruiser, themselves originally conceived as destroyer leaders. She was designated EDL-1 while engaged in experimental work with new sensors and weapons systems including SQS-23 sonar, Weapon Alpha, RUR-5 ASROC and automatic 3 inch/70 Mark 26 guns. She served entirely in the Atlantic except for a single deployment to the Indian Ocean and cruise around the world in 1968 shortly before she was retired from active service. A sister ship was authorized, but not completed after experience with the prototype did not justify repetition of the design.

The next design was for an unarmored cruiser of displacement similar to Italian Capitani Romani-class cruisers to carry the new 5 inch/54 caliber Mark 42 gun. Each of the four Mitscher-class ships received somewhat different experimental propulsion machinery powered by 1,200 pounds per square inch (82 atm) (8.3 MPa) Combustion Engineering forced-circulation boilers in DL-2 and DL-3; and Foster Wheeler boilers in DL-4 and DL-5. DL-2 and DL-3 had General Electric turbines while DL-4 and DL-5 had Westinghouse turbines. All four ships began operations in the Atlantic. DL-3 and DL-5 were transferred to the Pacific in 1956. DL-3 made routine deployments to the western Pacific for as long as she remained in commission, but DL-5 was transferred back to the Atlantic in 1963 after making a few western Pacific deployments. DL-2 and DL-4 made routine deployments to the Mediterranean Sea. The ships were built with AN/SPS-6 air search radar, AN/SPS-8 height finding radar, AN/QHBa scanning sonar and AN/SQG-1 attack sonar. During their first refit in the mid-1950s the AN/SQG-1 and AN/QHBa were replaced by AN/SQS-4 sonar and the secondary open 3 inch/50 caliber guns were replaced by 3 inch/70 Mark 26 guns. Later refits removed the unsatisfactory 3 inch/70 guns and Weapon Alpha.

After experimental flight operations with the Bell HUL-1 and Kaman HTK-1 aboard Mitscher in 1957, helicopter decks and hangars for the Gyrodyne QH-50 DASH were installed where the aft 3-inch guns had been. DL-2 and DL-3 underwent major overhaul at the Philadelphia Naval Shipyard beginning in 1966 including new Foster Wheeler boilers, AN/SQS-23 sonar, AN/SPS-37 air search radar, AN/SPS-48 height finding radar, and the Tartar Guided Missile Fire Control System for RIM-24 Tartar missiles. DL-4 and DL-5 had earlier received a new 70-foot bow section mounting the AN/SQS-26 sonar and spent the remainder of their service lives testing these prototypes until retirement, when their sisters emerged from overhaul at Philadelphia in 1968 for another decade of service as guided missile destroyers.

A third class of destroyer leaders was designed after observing the performance of propulsion and weapons systems tested aboard the Mitscher class. The first three ships were ordered with three 5 inch/54 caliber guns shortly after the name change to frigates. The next three were ordered with two 5 inch/54 guns forward, and a RIM-2 Terrier missile system aft, marking the transition to guided missile frigates (hull classification symbol DLG), intended to defend aircraft carriers against anti-ship cruise missiles. All ten ships were completed with a single 5 inch/54 gun forward, an ASROC launcher where the B gun would have been, and the missile system aft; but the class was variously named Coontz for the first ship to be ordered with a missile system, or Farragut for the lowest numbered ship to be completed in that configuration. ASROC and sonar gave the guided missile frigates an anti-submarine capability that most of the World War II cruiser conversions lacked. All were reclassified as guided missile destroyers in 1975.

== Similar ship classes ==
Comparison of ships with similar missions
Name	Nation	Date	No. built	Disp. (tons)	Speed (knots)	Torpedoes	Guns
Mirabello class	Italy	1917	3	1,811	35	4	8 × 4-inch (10 cm) guns
Yūbari	Japan	1923	1	2,890	35	4	6 × 14-centimetre (5.5 in) guns
Leone class	Italy	1924	3	1,743	34	4	8 × 12-centimetre (4.7 in) guns
Chacal class	France	1926	6	2,126	35	6	5 × 13-centimetre (5.1 in) guns
Fubuki class	Japan	1927	20	2,090	34	9	6 × 12.7 cm/50 Type 3 naval gun
Guépard class	France	1929	18	2,441	35	7	5 × Canon de 138 mm Modèle 1927
Navigatori class	Italy	1929	12	1,900	38	6	6 × 12-centimetre (4.7 in) guns
Regele Ferdinand class	Romania	1930	2	1,785	35	6	5 × 12-centimetre (4.7 in) guns
Dubrovnik	Yugoslavia	1931	1	1,910	40	6	4 × 14-centimetre (5.5 in) guns
Akatsuki class	Japan	1931	4	2,090	38	9	6 × 12.7 cm/50 Type 3 naval gun
Leningrad class	Soviet Navy	1932	6	2,180	40	4	5 × 130 mm/50 B13 Pattern 1936
Porter class	US	1935	8	1,850	37	8	8 × 5"/38 caliber gun
Le Fantasque class	France	1936	6	2,569	37	9	5 × Canon de 138 mm Modèle 1929
Asashio class	Japan	1936	10	1,961	35	8	6 × 12.7 cm/50 Type 3 naval gun
Tribal class	UK	1936	27	1,870	36	4	8 × 4.7-inch QF Mark XII gun
Zerstörer 1934	Germany	1937	16	2,200	38	8	5 × 12.7 cm SK C/34 naval guns
Somers class	US	1937	5	1,850	37	12	8 × 5"/38 caliber gun
Tashkent class	Soviet Navy	1937	1	2,893	43.5	9	6 × B-2LM
Kagerō class	Japan	1938	18	2,033	35	8	6 × 12.7 cm/50 Type 3 naval gun
Tromp class	Netherlands	1938	2	3,787	32	6	6 × 15-centimetre (5.9 in) guns
Zerstörer 1936	Germany	1938	6	2,400	38	8	5 × 12.7 cm SK C/34 naval guns
Mogador class	France	1939	2	2,994	39	10	8 × Canon de 138 mm Modèle 1929
L and M class	UK	1939	16	1,920	36	8	6 × 4.7-inch QF Mark XII gun
Zerstörer 1936A	Germany	1940	15	2,600	38	8	4 × 15 cm TbtsK C/36 naval guns
Yūgumo class	Japan	1941	20	2,077	35	8	6 × 12.7 cm/50 Type 3 naval gun
Gerard Callenburgh class	Netherlands	1941	2	1,922	36	8	5 × 12-centimetre (4.7 in) guns
Akizuki class	Japan	1942	12	2,701	33	4	8 × 10 cm/65 Type 98 naval gun
Shimakaze	Japan	1942	1	2,567	39	15	6 × 12.7 cm/50 Type 3 naval gun
Fletcher class	US	1942	175	2,050	37	10	5 × 5"/38 caliber gun
Capitani Romani class	Italy	1942	4	3,750	36	8	8 × 13.5-centimetre (5.3 in) guns
Allen M. Sumner class	US	1943	58	2,200	36	10	6 × 5"/38 caliber gun
Gearing class	US	1944	98	2,425	35	10	6 × 5"/38 caliber gun
Battle class	UK	1944	26	2,315	35	10	4 × QF 4.5-inch Mk III naval gun
DL-1	US	1953	1	5,600	32	4 + Mk 32	8 × 3"/70 Mark 26 gun
DL-2 class	US	1953	4	3,675	35	4 + Mk 32	2 × 5"/54 caliber Mark 42 gun
DL-6 class	US	1960	10	4,700	34	Mk 32	1 × 5"/54 caliber Mark 42 gun

== Evolution into guided missile cruisers ==
Two additional DLG classes and two similar nuclear-powered ships (DLGN) were completed by 1975 for a total of twenty additional guided missile frigates. These significantly larger ships were reclassified as guided missile cruisers (CG/CGN) in 1975. By 1995 the former guided missile frigates were replaced by the Ticonderoga-class cruisers and Arleigh Burke-class destroyers.

== See also ==
- Esploratori
- Flotilla leader
- Scout cruiser
- Guided missile frigate
- Guided missile destroyer
- Guided missile cruiser
- List of destroyers of the Second World War
- List of United States Navy destroyer leaders

== Sources ==
- Bauer, K. Jack; Roberts, Stephen S. (1991). Register of Ships of the U.S. Navy, 1775–1990: Major Combatants. Westport, Connecticut: Greenwood Press. ISBN 0-313-26202-0.
- Blackman, Raymond V.B. (1970–71). Jane's Fighting Ships. Jane's Yearbooks.
- Gardiner, Robert; Chumbley, Stephen (1995). Conway's All the World's Fighting Ships 1947–1995. London: Conway Maritime Press. ISBN 1-55750-132-7.
- Kafka, Roger; Pepperburg, Roy L. (1946). Warships of the World. Cornell Maritime Press.
- Lenton, H.T. (1976). German Warships of the Second World War. Arco Publishing. ISBN 0-668-04037-8.
- Lenton, H.T. (1968). Navies of the Second World War: Royal Netherlands Navy. Doubleday & Company.
- Lenton, H.T.; Colledge, J.J. (1964). British and Dominion Warships of World War II. Doubleday & Company.
- le Masson, Henri (1969). Navies of the Second World War: The French Navy 1. Doubleday & Company.
- Silverstone, Paul H. (1968). U.S. Warships of World War II. Doubleday & Company.
- Taylor, J.C. (1966). German Warships of World War II. Doubleday & Company.
- Watts, Anthony J. (1966). Japanese Warships of World War II. Doubleday & Company.
