= List of destroyer classes of the United States Navy =

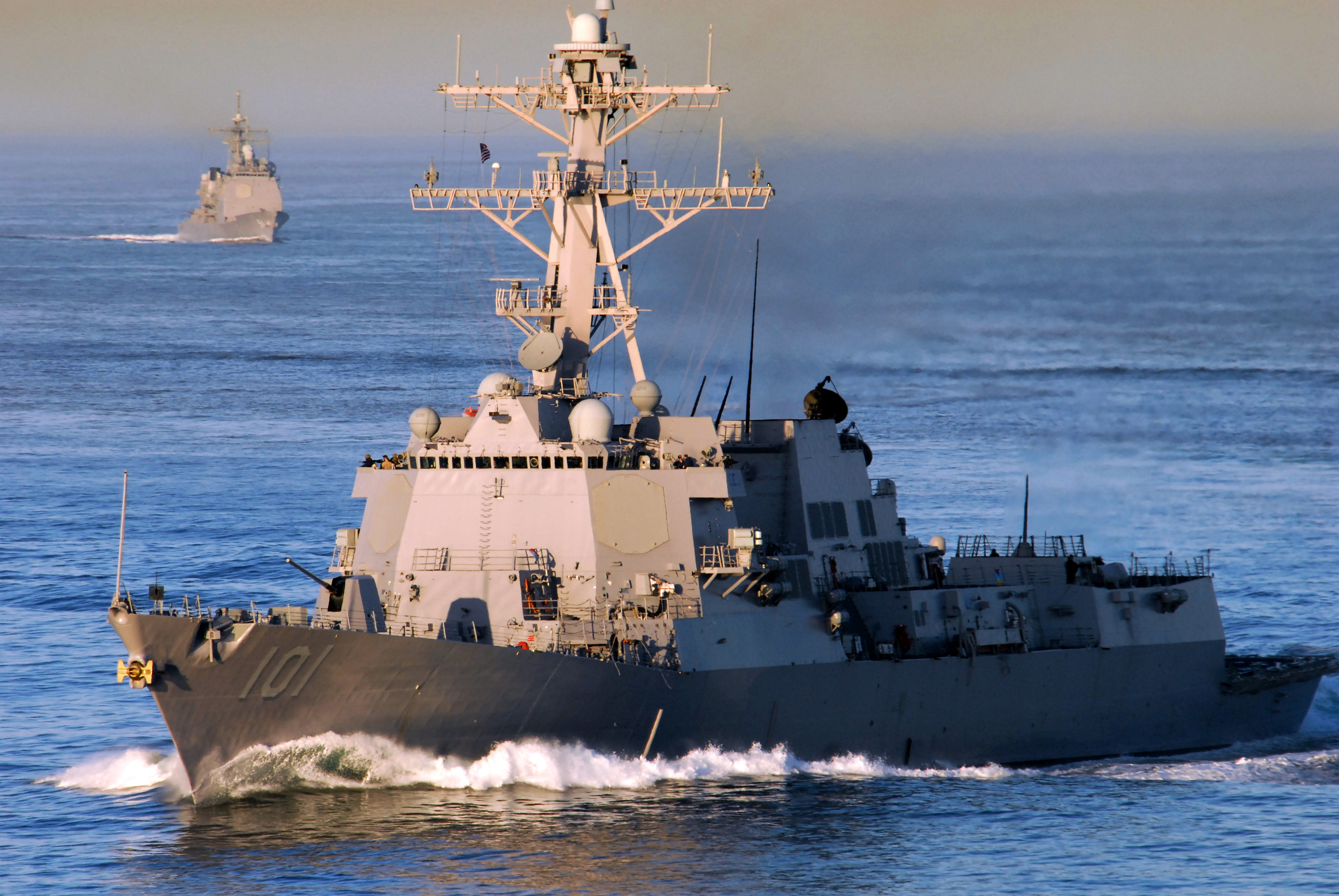
USS Gridley, an Arleigh Burke-class destroyer

The first automotive torpedo was developed in 1866, and the torpedo boat was developed soon after. In 1898, while the Spanish–American War was being fought in the Caribbean and the Pacific, Assistant Secretary of the Navy Theodore Roosevelt wrote that the Spanish torpedo boat destroyers were the only threat to the American Navy, and pushed for the acquisition of similar vessels. On 4 May 1898, the US Congress authorized the first sixteen torpedo boat destroyers and twelve seagoing torpedo boats for the United States Navy.

In World War I, the U.S. Navy began mass-producing destroyers, laying 273 keels of the Clemson and Wickes-class destroyers. The peacetime years between 1919 and 1941 resulted in many of these flush deck destroyers being laid up. Additionally, treaties regulated destroyer construction. The 1500-ton destroyers built in the 1930s under the treaties had stability problems that limited expansion of their armament in World War II. During World War II, the United States began building larger 2100-ton destroyers with five-gun main batteries, but without stability problems.

The first major warship produced by the U.S. Navy after World War II (and in the Cold War) were "frigates"—the ships were originally designated destroyer leaders but reclassified in 1975 as guided missile cruisers (except the Farragut class became guided missile destroyers). These grew out of the last all-gun destroyers of the 1950s. In the middle 1970s the Spruance-class destroyers entered service, optimized for anti-submarine warfare. A special class of guided missile destroyers was produced for the Shah of Iran, but due to the Iranian Revolution these ships could not be delivered and were added to the U.S. Navy.

The Arleigh Burke class, introduced in 1991, has been the U.S. Navy's only destroyer class in commission since 2005; construction continued through 2012 and was restarted in 2015. A further class, the Zumwalt, is entering service; the first ship was launched in 2013. The Zumwalt class will number three ships.

== Pre–World War I ==
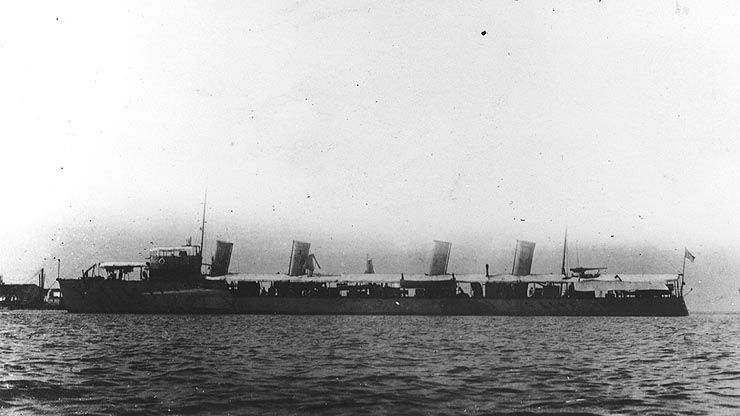
The first destroyer of the United States Navy, USS Bainbridge, around 1915–1916

In 1864, US Navy Lt. William B. Cushing sank the ironclad CSS Albemarle using a "spar torpedo"—an explosive device mounted on a long pole and detonated underwater. Two years later in Austria, the British engineer Robert Whitehead developed a compressed air "automotive" torpedo; capable of 6–8 knots (3.1–4.1 m/s) over a distance of 200–400 yards (180–370 m). The threat a small, fast, torpedo–delivering ship could pose to the battle line became clear to navies around the world; giving birth to the torpedo boat, including USS Cushing of the United States Navy.

During the Spanish–American War, Assistant Secretary of the Navy Theodore Roosevelt wrote Spanish torpedo boat destroyers (such as the 370-ton Furor) were "the only real menace" to the fleet blockading Santiago, and pushed for the acquisition of torpedo boats and torpedo boat destroyers. As President, Theodore Roosevelt continued to pay close attention to naval affairs, including the expansion of the Navy's fleet of destroyers.

In 1898 Congress authorized 16 torpedo boat destroyers, which would join the fleet by 1903. The first torpedo boat destroyers, the Bainbridge class, featured two torpedo tubes and two 3-inch (76 mm) guns, displacing 400 short tons (360 t). The subsequent Smith and Paulding classes displaced 740 short tons (670 t), the reason these classes were nicknamed "flivvers" (lightweights, after the Model T Ford). By the time the United States entered World War I, destroyers displaced 1,000 short tons (910 t) and burned oil instead of coal. These "1000 tonners" were armed with eight to twelve torpedo tubes, four 4-inch (102 mm)/50 caliber guns; and had a complement of approximately 100 officers and men. The 1000 tonners were the Cassin through Sampson classes, and were also called "broken deckers", due to their high forecastles.

Pre-World War I ship classes of the United States Navy
| Class name | Number of ships | First ship laid down | Last ship commissioned | Notes | References | Photo |
|---|---|---|---|---|---|---|
| Bainbridge | 13 | 1899 | 1902 | Part of the original 16 "torpedo boat destroyers" authorized by Congress. | | |
| Truxtun | 3 | 1899 | 1903 | Part of the original 16 "torpedo boat destroyers" authorized by Congress. | | |
| Smith | 5 | 1908 | 1909 | Known as "flivvers" for their light weight of 740 tons. | | |
| Paulding | 21 | 1909 | 1912 | Known as "flivvers" for their light weight of 740 tons. | | |
| Cassin | 4 | 1912 | 1913 | Known as "broken deckers" for their high forecastles, or "1000 tonners" because of their weight. | | |
| Aylwin | 4 | 1912 | 1914 | Known as "broken deckers" for their high forecastles, or "1000 tonners" because of their weight. | | |
| O'Brien | 6 | 1913 | 1915 | Known as "broken deckers" for their high forecastles, or "1000 tonners" because of their weight. | | |
| Tucker | 6 | 1914 | 1916 | Known as "broken deckers" for their high forecastles, or "1000 tonners" because of their weight. | | |
| Sampson | 6 | 1915 | 1917 | Known as "broken deckers" for their high forecastles, or "1000 tonners" because of their weight. | | |

== World War I ==
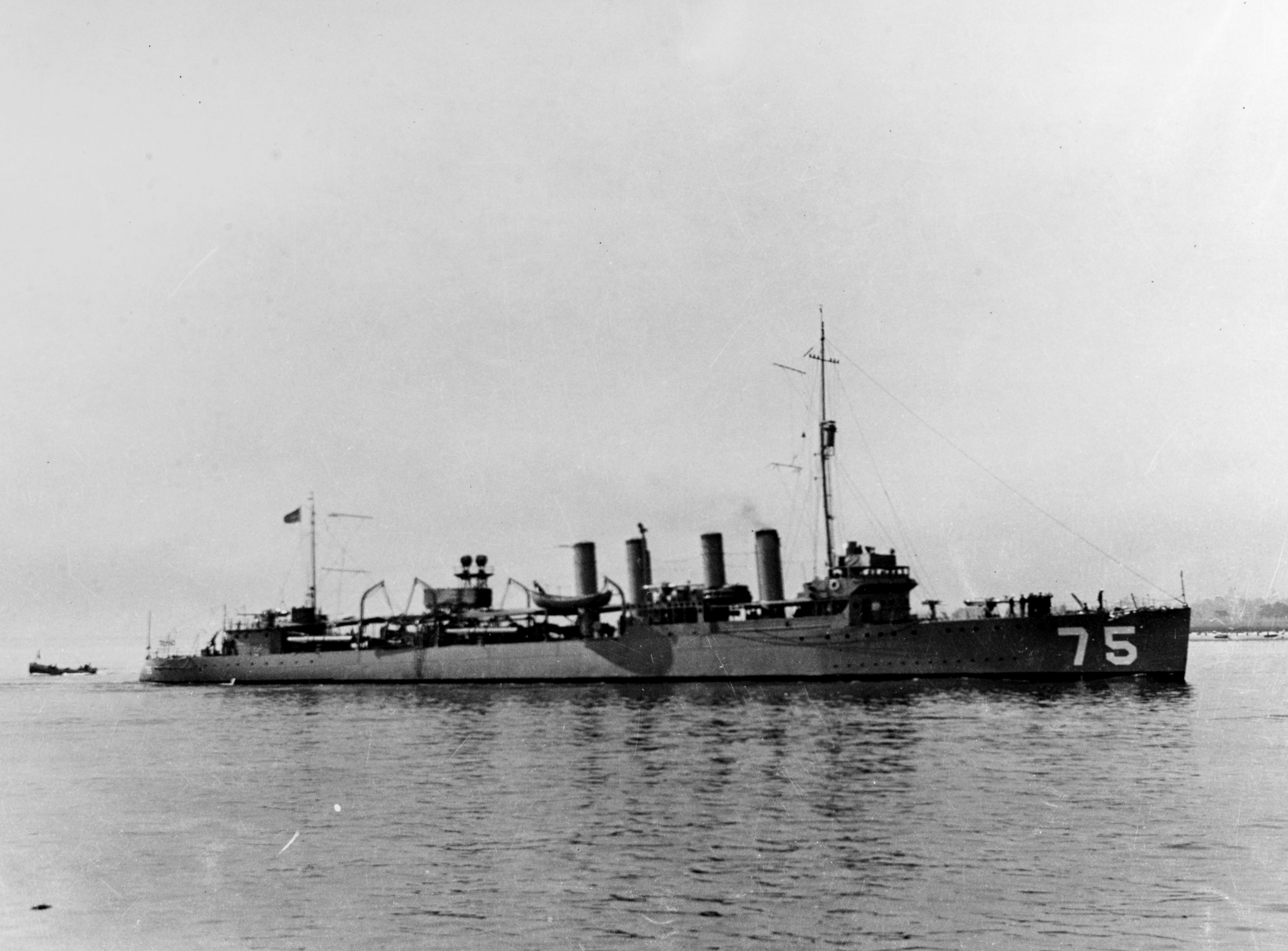
USS Wickes in harbor, circa early 1920s

Prior to entering World War I in 1917, the United States began producing destroyers to a new design with a continuous sheer strake, collectively referred to as "flush deckers". Six prototypes of the Caldwell class were dissimilar: three had three stacks; two of these also had three screws. The others of this and the 267 ships of the mass-production Wickes and Clemson classes that followed all had two screws. As built, they also had four stacks, which gave rise to the nicknames "four stackers" or "four pipers". Eleven shipyards participated in their construction, which peaked in 1917 and 1918. By the time of the Armistice of 11 November 1918, keels for 177 ships had been laid and 41 had joined the fleet. Though the remaining ships were not needed in peacetime, the building program continued and by the end of May 1921, all but four of the 273 flush-deckers had been placed in commission. The final two did not follow until August 1922.

While the flush-deckers' freeboard fore and aft were designed to match preceding classes, the new ships differed in other respects. The waist guns were moved to a platform amidships, the galley beneath them; and a bulwark added between the galley and the bridge.

The standard displacement of the flush deck destroyers was 1,200 ± 90 long tons (1,219 ± 91 t), the length approximately 314 feet (96 m), the beam measured approximately 31 feet (9.4 m), and the draft approximately 116 inches (2.9 m). A typical flush deck destroyer had a normal crew of 105 officers and men, and was armed with four 4-inch deck guns, one 3-inch anti-aircraft gun, 12 21-inch (533 mm) torpedo tubes, two stern-mounted depth charge racks, along with .50-caliber machine guns and small arms. The mass-produced classes also had four boilers providing steam to a pair of steam turbines, each of which drove a 9-foot-diameter (2.7 m) screw at a combined 27,000 shaft horsepower (20 MW) for a top speed of about 33 knots (17 m/s). Destroyers quickly acquired the anti-submarine warfare mission against U-boats in the Atlantic and Mediterranean, being equipped with depth charge racks, hydrophones, and eventually Y-gun depth charge throwers. However, it was very difficult to successfully attack a U-boat with World War I technology, and US anti-submarine forces only scored two kills in that war.

World War I ship classes of the United States Navy
| Class name | Number of ships | First ship laid down | Last ship commissioned | Notes | References | Photo |
|---|---|---|---|---|---|---|
| Caldwell | 6 | 1916 | 1920 | Called flush deckers due to lack of raised forecastle. | | |
| Wickes | 111 | 1917 | 1921 | Called flush deckers due to lack of raised forecastle. Sometimes, Wickes class destroyers are split into four categories: Wickes class, 38 ships; Little class, 52 ships; Lamberton class, 11 ships; and Tattnall class, 10 ships. | | |
| Clemson | 156 | 1918 | 1922 | Called flush deckers due to lack of raised forecastle. | | |

== Between the World Wars ==
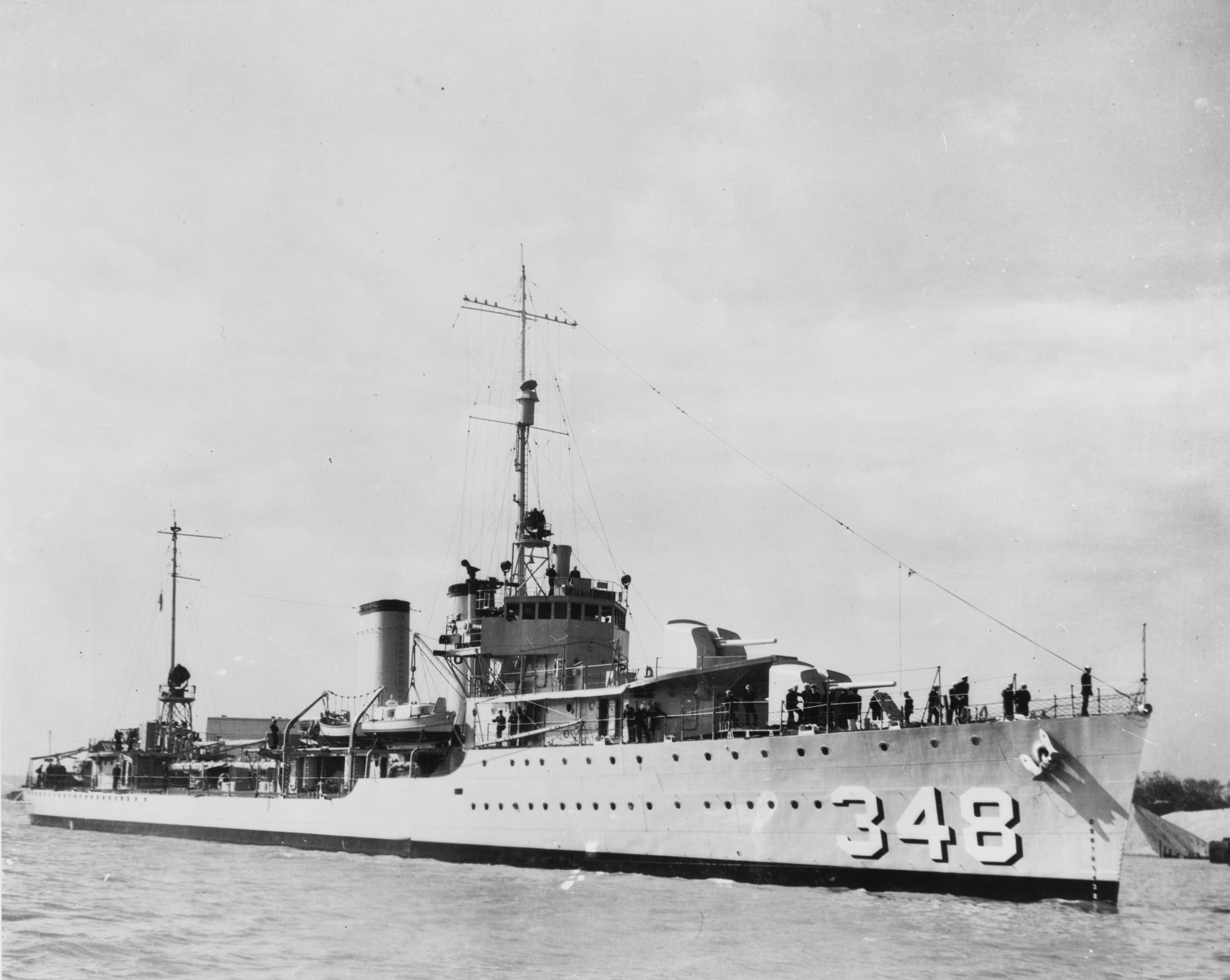
USS Farragut, a Farragut-class destroyer, circa 1935

After the end of World War I, there was little need for the destroyers built, so many were laid up, and fourteen had their torpedo tubes removed and were converted to minesweepers. On 8 September 1923, seven of the ships ran aground off the coast of California in the U.S. Navy's worst ever peacetime disaster.

In 1922, the Washington Naval Treaty was signed by the United States, the British Empire, the Empire of Japan, France, and Italy. The treaty called for a freeze in the size and composition of the world's major navies, including the U.S. Navy, which ceased production of large capital ships and destroyers. The London Naval Treaty, a 1930 agreement between the same parties (except France), established total destroyer tonnage limits for the navies. The treaty also defined two categories: destroyer and destroyer leader; along with the maximum tonnage of each category, and the allowable ratio of one category to another.

In the London Naval Treaty, destroyers were established as "surface vessels of war the standard displacement (S.D.) of which does not exceed 1,850 tons and with a gun not above 5.1 inch caliber", as published in Ship’s Data for U.S. Naval Vessels. The “total completed tonnage not to be exceeded on December 31, 1936” was 150,000 S.D., but “not more than 16% of the allowed tonnage... shall be employed in vessels over 1,500 tons S.D.”. The new, higher limits rendered the existing flush-deckers obsolete, and the General Board soon moved to replace them. Since Japan was considered a probable adversary and was building destroyers through the 1920s, the General Board replaced the four-stackers with ships that could carry large quantities of fuel, ammunition, and supplies as needed to conduct operations across the vast Pacific Ocean.

The U.S. Navy resumed destroyer construction in 1932 with the Farragut class. For the next seven years, the United States Navy constructed "1500 tonners", or "goldplaters". The goldplaters earned this name because of the "over–lavish facilities", which drew comment from seasoned destroyermen. The armament of the Farragut and Mahan class destroyers initially included five 5 inch dual purpose guns, a number later reduced to four due to stability problems and a desire for a larger torpedo armament. With the introduction of the dual purpose main guns, destroyers acquired an anti-aircraft mission. The 1500-ton Mahan, Dunlap, Gridley, Bagley, and Benham classes, the 1570-ton Sims class, and the 1850-ton Porter and Somers-class destroyer leaders were all laid down in quick succession following the original goldplaters.

The Gleaves and Benson classes were similar in design to the Sims class, but had two stacks and a "split" or echeloned powerplant for extra endurance against torpedo attacks.

Interwar (World Wars I & II) ship classes of the United States Navy
| Class name | Number of ships | First ship laid down | Last ship commissioned | Notes | References | Photo |
|---|---|---|---|---|---|---|
| Farragut | 8 | 1932 | 1935 | Known as "1500 tonners" due to their weight, or "goldplaters" due to the luxury as compared to previous classes. | | |
| Porter | 8 | 1933 | 1937 | The first of the 1850-ton "leaders". | | |
| Mahan | 18 | 1934 | 1937 | The first 1500 tonners with high-pressure high-temperature propulsion machinery. The last two ships of the Mahan class are sometimes considered the Dunlap class. | | |
| Gridley | 4 | 1935 | 1938 | Repeat 1500 tonners built by Bethlehem Steel. | | |
| Bagley | 8 | 1935 | 1937 | Repeat 1500 tonners similar to the Mahan class. | | |
| Somers | 5 | 1935 | 1939 | Repeat 1850-ton leaders modified from the Porter-class design. | | |
| Benham | 10 | 1936 | 1939 | The last 1500 tonners. | | |
| Sims | 12 | 1937 | 1940 | The first U.S. Navy destroyer class unconstrained by treaty limitations. | | |
| Gleaves | 66 | 1938 | 1943 | A "split powerplant" modification of the Sims class. Gleaves class was originally divided into the Livermore (18 ships) and Bristol (48 Gleaves + 24 Benson) classes. | | |
| Benson | 30 | 1938 | 1943 | Bethlehem design similar to and built concurrent with the Gleaves class. | | |

== World War II ==
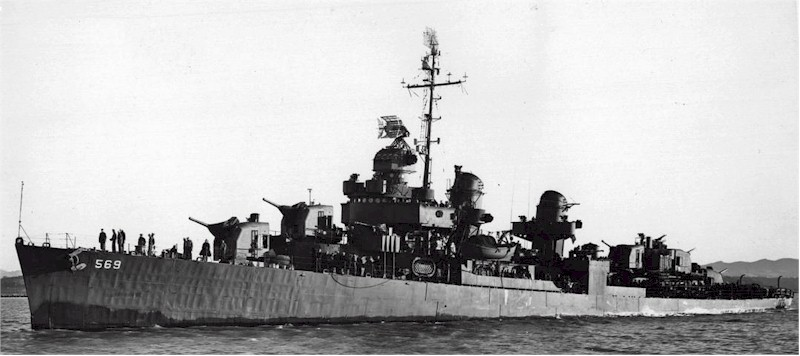
USS Aulick, February 24, 1945

On 7 December 1941, the day the United States entered World War II, the United States Navy had 100 destroyers seven years old or newer. This number included 27 Benson and Gleaves-class destroyers. However, none were equipped with torpedoes comparable to the (then unknown) Type 93 torpedoes ("Long Lance torpedo") of the Imperial Japanese Navy, and only destroyer leaders had more than four main guns—inferior to the six guns on a Japanese Fubuki-class destroyer (the first 24 ships of the Benson/Gleaves class were built with five guns, but excessive topweight led to one being removed).

In 1940, fifty "flush deckers" were transferred to the British Royal Navy and the Royal Canadian Navy under the Destroyers for Bases Agreement. Other "flush deckers" were converted as high speed transports (APD), seaplane tenders (AVD), minelayers (DM), minesweepers (DMS), and other roles (AG), while some were retained as destroyers. Most remaining in US service were rearmed with varying numbers of 3 inch dual purpose guns.

After the 1500 ton limit on destroyers was changed to a 3000-ton limit with the Second London Naval Treaty, the United States Navy began sketches for a five-gun ship— on an enlarged hull. Introduced in 1942, the 175 Fletcher class "2100 tonners". became the U.S. Navy's signature destroyer in the Pacific War. By the end of World War II, the U.S. Navy had also commissioned 112 six-gun destroyers derived from the Fletcher design; 67 Allen M. Sumner class 2200 tonners and 45 Gearing class 2250 tonners. The Allen M. Sumner class' hull was slightly wider than the Fletcher class', while the Gearing-class design was a lengthened version of the Allen M. Sumners. By 1945, as the threat from kamikazes increased and the threat from the Japanese surface fleet decreased, torpedoes and guns were partially (or completely in the case of torpedoes on some ships) removed from most US destroyers in favor of light anti-aircraft guns. Destroyers had acquired the hazardous radar picket mission by this time. Collectively, these destroyer designs are sometimes regarded as the most successful of World War II.

World War II destroyer classes of the United States Navy
| Class name | Number of ships | First ship laid down | Last ship commissioned | Notes | References | Photo |
|---|---|---|---|---|---|---|
| interwar | 97 | | | summary of the classes that were built in the 1930s and were front-line destroyers and in the opening campaigns the only available ships | | |
| Bristol | 72 | 1940 | 1943 | pseudo-class grouping together 24 Benson and 48 Gleaves that were rapidly produced following the passing of the Two-Ocean Navy Act. Can also mean: all 1650-ton destroyers originally launched with 4 main guns. | | |
| Fletcher | 175 | 1941 | 1944 | The U.S. Navy's first large destroyers and the most numerous of the wartime classes. | | |
| Allen M. Sumner | 58 | 1943 | 1946 | A six-gun derivative of the Fletcher design. 70 ships were originally laid down as Allen M. Sumner class, but 12 were completed as Robert H. Smith-class fast minelayers. | | |
| Robert H. Smith | 12 | 1943 | 1952 | Sumner destroyers with mine laying gear and no torpedo tubes installed | | |
| Gearing | 98 | 1944 | 1952 | "Long hull" versions of the Allen M. Sumner class. | | |

== Cold War and beyond ==
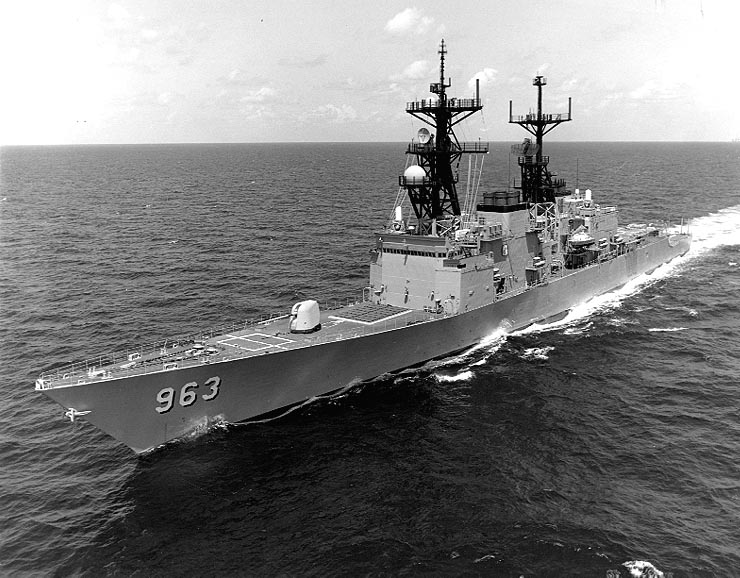
USS Spruance in 1987

The first major warship the U.S. Navy constructed after World War II was an all-weather, anti-submarine hunter-killer, designated "destroyer leader" (DL) but referred to as a "frigate". The majority of these carried long-range surface-to-air missiles (SAMs) to escort carrier and amphibious task forces and were designated "guided missile destroyer leaders"; some were nuclear-powered (DLG or DLGN). In 1975, the 12 remaining Mitscher- and Farragut-class ships were reclassified as guided-missile destroyers (DDGs 35–46), and the other classes were reclassified as guided-missile cruisers (CG or CGN).

Derived from the Fletcher concept, the all-gun Forrest Sherman-class destroyer was the successor to the Fletcher, Allen M. Sumner, and Gearing classes. The following Charles F. Adams class added a short-range SAM launcher on an enlarged hull and were classified as DDGs.

The Spruance class was designed to serve as all-weather anti-submarine escorts for aircraft carrier task forces, as their anti-air missile complement was only sufficient for point defense. The Spruance-class destroyers were the first ships in the United States Navy powered with gas turbines—four marine turboshaft (jet-type) engines driving two shafts with reversible-pitch propellers. The 31 Spruance-class ships began service in September 1975 through the 1990s, when 24 members of the class were upgraded with vertical launching systems, and the last was decommissioned in 2005. The Kidd class was based on the Spruance class, but designed as more advanced multi-purpose ships with a significant SAM armament, intended for the Iranian Navy. In 1979, a revolution took place in Iran; the Shah was dethroned, but instead of cancelling the four ships, they were acquired by the U.S. Navy, where they were nicknamed the "Ayatollah" or "dead Admiral" class.

USS Arleigh Burke, the lead ship of the Arleigh Burke class, was the first destroyer named after a living person—World War II Admiral Arleigh Burke. At her commissioning, USS Arleigh Burke was extolled as the most powerful surface warship ever built. Arleigh Burke is one-third longer and correspondingly heavier than the Fletcher-class destroyers of the squadron Burke commanded in World War II, but of about the same complement. The Arleigh Burke–class destroyers were based around the Aegis Combat System, like the larger Ticonderoga-class cruisers. The Arleigh Burke class comprises four "Flights": Flight I, composed of 21 ships; Flight II, composed of 7 ships; Flight IIA, to be composed of 47 ships; and Flight III, to enter Initial operating capability in 2023.

Zumwalt-class destroyer production was limited to three ships due to burgeoning costs. Including research, the program costs reached $22.5 billion for the three ships. The first was commissioned in 2016, and the last was expected to be commissioned in 2024.

Cold War and later ship classes of the United States Navy
| Class name | Number of ships | First ship laid down | Last ship commissioned | Notes | References | Photo |
|---|---|---|---|---|---|---|
| Norfolk | 1 | 1949 | 1953 | First major US warship after World War II. Classified as "Destroyer Leader" the ship was decommissioned before the smaller destroyer leaders were reclassified as destroyers and the larger as cruisers by the United States Navy 1975 ship reclassification | | USS Norfolk (DL-1) |
| Mitscher | 4 | 1949 | 1954 | Originally designated as destroyers, the ships would have been the first post war 'standard' destroyers but they were reclassified as "destroyer leader". The first two ships were later once again reclassified as guided missile destroyers by the United States Navy 1975 ship reclassification. | | |
| Forrest Sherman | 18 | 1953 | 1959 | Derived from the Fletcher concept. | | |
| Farragut | 10 | 1956 | 1961 | Originally designated "destroyer leader". The Farragut class of the Cold War was also called the Coontz class. | | |
| Charles F. Adams | 23 | 1957 | 1964 | Guided missile derivative of the Forrest Sherman class. | | |
| Spruance | 31 | 1972 | 1983 | First United States Navy ship to use gas turbines. | | |
| Kidd | 4 | 1978 | 1982 | The Kidd class was based upon the Spruance class but designed as more advanced multi-purpose vessels, originally intended for the Iranian Navy. | | |
| Arleigh Burke | 74 (another 25 planned) | 1988 | —N/a | Ships still being built. Lead ship was first destroyer to be named after living person. | | |
| Zumwalt | 3 | 2008 | —N/a | Only three of the 32 planned ships were built due to project cost. | | |

== Production summary ==
Production of United States Navy destroyers, broken out by shipyard and class of destroyer.

| Shipyard | B | T | Smith | Paulding | Cassin | Aylwin | O'Brien | Tucker | Sampson |
|---|---|---|---|---|---|---|---|---|---|
| Neafie & Levy | 3 | | | | | | | | |
| William R. Trigg | 2 | | | | | | | | |
| Harlan and Hollingsworth | 2 | | | | | | | | |
| Union Iron Works | 3 | | | | | | | | |
| Gas Engine & Power Co | 1 | | | | | | | | |
| Maryland Steel Company | | 3 | | | | | | | |
| Newport News S.B. | | | | 4 | | | | | |
| Fore River | 2 | | | 4 | 1 | | 1 | 1 | 2 |
| Cramp & Sons | | | 2 | 4 | | 4 | 3 | 2 | 1 |
| New York S.B. | | | 1 | 4 | 1 | | 1 | 2 | |
| Bath Iron Works | | | 2 | 5 | 2 | | 1 | 1 | 2 |
| Mare Island Navy Yard | | | | | | | | | 1 |

| Shipyard | prior | Caldwell | Wickes | Clemson |
|---|---|---|---|---|
| (others) | 11 | | | |
| Seattle Construction and Drydock Company (Todd Corp.) | | 1 | | |
| Charleston Navy Yard | | | 1 | |
| Mare Island Navy Yard | 1 | 1 | 8 | 6 |
| Norfolk Navy Yard | | 1 | | 3 |
| Cramp & Sons | 16 | 2 | 21 | 25 |
| Bath Iron Works | 13 | 1 | 8 | 3 |
| Fore River | 11 | | 26 | 10 |
| Union Iron Works | 3 | | 26 | 40 |
| Newport News Shipbuilding | 4 | | 11 | 14 |
| New York Shipbuilding | 9 | | 10 | 20 |
| Bethlehem Squantum Victory | | | | 35 |

A decade passes, during which some of the previously produced destroyers are scrapped to comply with treaty limitations. In the early 1930s, the Navy begins to modernize its destroyer fleet. USS Farragut (DD-348) is the point in time where U.S. destroyers start carrying 5-inch main guns that can shoot at aircraft with a high rate of fire and good accuracy (in contrast to previous single purpose destroyer guns and much less capable contemporary dual purpose guns) as well as many other improvements. The Destroyer design basically starts from scratch. Production during this period is a cold arms race where each nation tries to make the most of the limited tonnage that the international treaties allow.

| Shipyard | prior | F | P | Mahan | Gridley | Bagley | Somers | Benham | Sims |
|---|---|---|---|---|---|---|---|---|---|
| others | 111 | | | | | | | | |
| New York Shipbuilding | 39 | | 4 | | | | | | |
| Bethlehem Staten Island (Note: this yard became part of Bethlehem Shipbuilding Corporation in 1938. The four Mahans were built by United Shipyards) | | | | 4 | | | | | |
| Brooklyn Navy Yard | | 2 | | 2 | | | | | |
| Fore River | 47 | 1 | 4 | | 2 | | | | |
| Union Iron Works | 69 | | | | 2 | | | | |
| Mare Island Navy Yard | 16 | | | 2 | | 1 | | | |
| Puget Sound Navy Yard | | 1 | | | | 2 | | 1 | |
| Boston Navy Yard | | 2 | | 2 | | 2 | | 2 | 2 |
| Bath Iron Works | 25 | 1 | | 2 | | | 3 | | 2 |
| Philadelphia Navy Yard | | 1 | | | | | | 1 | 1 |
| Norfolk Navy Yard | 4 | | | 2 | | 3 | | 2 | 2 |
| Federal Shipbuilding | | | | 2 | | | 2 | 3 | 2 |
| Charleston Navy Yard | 1 | | | | | | | 1 | 1 |
| Newport News Shipbuilding | 29 | | | | | | | | 2 |

There are 3 production periods covered in the following table.

1. 6 Benson and 18 Gleaves in FY38, FY39, FY40 (8 per year)
2. 24 Benson and 48 Gleaves roughly in a vastly extended FY41 covering the regular FY41 approriations act of 11 June (8 ships) and the first and second supplemental appropriations acts of 26 June and 9 September (64 ships), in addition most of the Fletchers in the same 1940 acts
3. the remaining Fletchers, all Sumners, Smiths and Gearings covered by later legislation, continuing the expansion of production initiated in 1940, carried out starting during 1941, slowing down by 1944 and lasting into 1946

The Consolidated Steel yard in Orange, the Seattle-Tacoma plant in Seattle and Bethlehem San Pedro were essentially purpose-built to produce destroyers between the fall of 1940 and the spring of 1941.

Gulf Shipbuilding was reactivated from essentially nothing, but had a primary focus of merchant ship production.

The other yards were significantly expanded during the same time period.

| Shipyard | prior | B | G | Fletcher | Sumner | Smith | Gearing |
|---|---|---|---|---|---|---|---|
| others | 182 | | | | | | |
| Philadelphia Navy Yard | 3 | | 2 | | | | |
| Norfolk Navy Yard | 13 | | 2 | | | | |
| Boston Navy Yard | 10 | 2 | 10 | 14 | | | |
| Charleston Navy Yard | 3 | 1 | 7 | 10 | | | |
| Puget Sound Navy Yard | 4 | 1 | 1 | 8 | | | |
| Fore River | 54 | 8 | | | | | 4 |
| Union Iron Works | 71 | 9 | | 18 | 6 | | 3 |
| Bethlehem Staten Island | 4 | 5 | | 15 | 10 | 3 | 11 |
| Bethlehem San Pedro | | 4 | | 10 | 5 | 3 | 4 |
| Bath Iron Works | 33 | | 8 | 31 | 14 | 6 | 30 |
| Federal Shipbuilding | 9 | | 26 | 29 | 18 | | 10 |
| Seattle-Tacoma | 1 (Note: The Seattle Construction and Drydock Company was part of Todd Shipyards when building Gwin and less than a kilometer away from SeaTac's destroyer plant) | | 10 | 21 | 5 | | 9 |
| Consolidated Steel | | | | 12 | | | 27 |
| Gulf Shipbuilding | | | | 7 | | | |

== See also ==
- List of United States Navy destroyers
- List of United States Navy destroyer leaders
- List of United States Navy ships
