= USS Conner =

Two ships in the United States Navy have been named USS Conner for David Conner.

- USS Conner (DD-72), a Caldwell-class destroyer, launched in 1917 and transferred to the Royal Navy as HMS Leeds in 1940
- USS Conner (DD-582), a Fletcher-class destroyer, and launched 18 July 1942, decommissioned in 1946
