= USS Gwin =

Four ships in the United States Navy have been named USS Gwin for William Gwin.

- USS Gwin (TB-16) was a torpedo boat, commissioned in 1898 and decommissioned in 1914. She was renamed Cyane and reclassified YFB-4 in 1920, and finally sold in 1925
- USS Gwin (DD-71) was a Caldwell-class destroyer commissioned in 1920, and decommissioned in 1922.
- USS Gwin (DD-433) was a Gleaves-class destroyer, commissioned in 1941, served in World War II and sank in battle in July 1943.
- USS Gwin (DM-33) was a Robert H. Smith-class destroyer-minelayer, commissioned in 1944 and decommissioned in 1958. She was transferred to Turkey in 1971 and renamed TCG Muavenet (DM-357). She was scrapped in 1992.
