= USS Gwin (DD-71) =

Caldwell-class destroyer

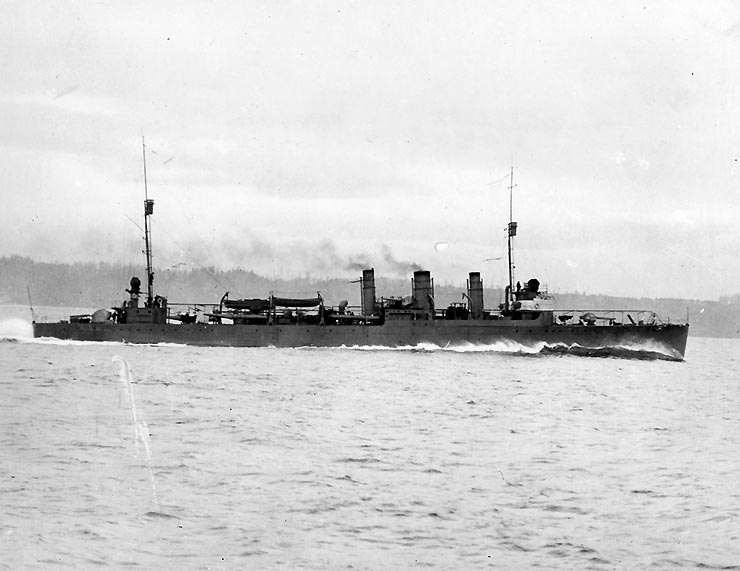
- USS Gwin (DD-71) at high speed circa 1920

History

United States
- Name: USS Gwin
- Namesake: William Gwin (1832–1863)
- Builder: Seattle Construction and Drydock Company
- Laid down: 21 June 1917
- Launched: 25 December 1917
- Commissioned: 18 March 1920
- Decommissioned: 28 June 1922
- Stricken: 25 January 1936
- Identification: DD-71
- Fate: Sold for scrapping 16 March 1939

General characteristics
- Class & type: Caldwell-class destroyer
- Displacement: 1,262 long tons (1,282 t) (standard); 1,379 long tons (1,401 t) (deep load)
- Length: 315 ft 6 in (96.2 m)
- Beam: 30 ft 7 in (9.32 m)
- Draught: 8 ft 10 in (2.7 m)
- Installed power: 18,500 shp (13,800 kW); 4 Thornycroft boilers
- Propulsion: 2 shafts, 2 steam turbines
- Speed: 30 knots (56 km/h; 35 mph)
- Range: 2,500 nautical miles (4,600 km; 2,900 mi) at 20 knots (37 km/h; 23 mph)
- Complement: 5 officers, 95 enlisted men
- Armament: 4 × single 4-inch (102 mm) guns; 2 × single 1-pounder AA guns; 4 × triple 21 inch (533 mm) torpedo tubes

USS Gwin (DD-71) was one of six Caldwell-class destroyers built for the United States Navy. She was in commission from 1920 to 1922.

== Description ==
The Caldwells were a transitional design between the "thousand-tonners" of the Sampson-class and the mass-produced destroyers built during World War I. They introduced the flush deck and were known as the first of the "flush-deckers" that were so wet in heavy weather. The ship displaced 1,262 long tons (1,282 t) at standard load and 1,379 long tons (1,401 t) at deep load. They had an overall length of 315 feet 6 inches (96.2 m), a beam of 30 feet 7 inches (9.3 m) and a draft of 8 feet 10 inches (2.7 m). They had a crew of five officers and 95 enlisted men.

The propulsion arrangements differed between the ships of the class. Gwin was powered by two Parsons steam turbines, each driving one propeller shaft, using steam provided by four Thornycroft boilers. The turbines developed a total of 18,500 shaft horsepower (13,800 kW) and were designed to reach a speed of 30 knots (56 km/h; 35 mph). The ships carried a maximum of 205 long tons (208 t) of fuel oil that gave them a range of 2,500 nautical miles (4,600 km; 2,900 mi) at 20 knots (37 km/h; 23 mph).

The ships were armed with four 4-inch (102 mm) guns in single mounts and were fitted with two 1-pounder guns for anti-aircraft defense. Their primary weapon, though, was their torpedo battery of a dozen 21 inch (533 mm) torpedo tubes in four triple mounts. During World War I, the 1-pounders were replaced by 3-inch (76 mm) anti-aircraft (AA) guns and a "Y-gun" depth charge thrower replaced the aft AA gun and the searchlight.

== Construction and commissioning ==
Gwin, the second Navy ship named for Lieutenant Commander William Gwin, was launched on 22 December 1917 by the Seattle Construction & Drydock Company, Seattle, Washington, sponsored by Mrs. James S. Woods. She was commissioned at the Puget Sound Navy Yard in Bremerton, Washington, on 18 March 1920.

== Service history ==
Gwin departed Puget Sound on 26 April 1920 for calls at California ports, then transited the Panama Canal bound for Newport, Rhode Island, where she arrived on 2 June 1920. She subsequently participated in operations along the United States East Coast as far south as Charleston, South Carolina.

== Decommissioning and disposal ==
Gwin was decommissioned at the Philadelphia Navy Yard in Philadelphia, Pennsylvania, on 28 June 1922. She remained inactive there until her name was struck from the Navy List on 25 January 1937. Her hulk was sold for scrapping to the Union Shipbuilding Company of Baltimore, Maryland, on 16 March 1939.
