= Blockade of Veracruz =

- Part of the Mexican–American War
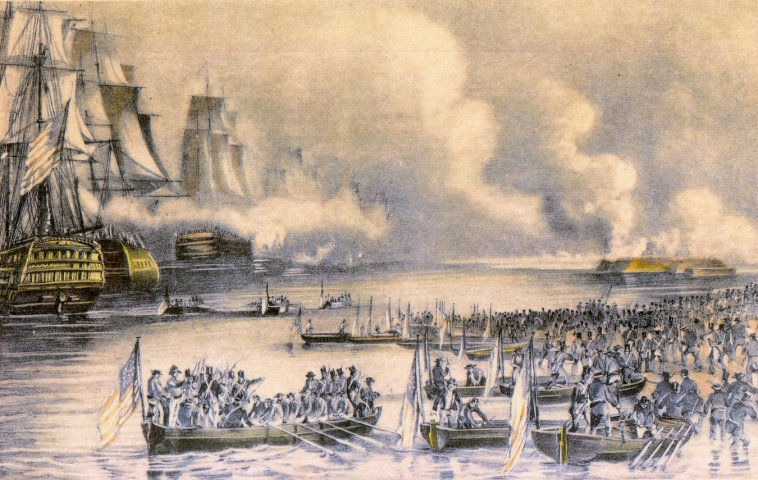
- American forces landing at Veracruz in 1847.
Date	1846–1848
Location	Veracruz, Mexico, Gulf of Mexico
Result	United States victory

Belligerents
United States	Mexico

Commanders and leaders
David Conner; Matthew C. Perry	(Mexico) Juan Esteban Morales

The Blockade of Veracruz was a conflict during the Mexican–American War. The blockade of Veracruz was extremely important in the Mexican-American War in stopping the trade of contraband.

Secretary of the Navy George Bancroft instructed Commodore David Conner's Home Squadron to "exercise all the rights that belong to you as commander-in-chief of a belligerent squadron." On 14 May 1846, Conner proclaimed Veracruz, Alvarado, Tampico and Matamoros under blockade. Conner sent the sloop-of-war St. Mary's to Tampico, the paddle frigate Mississippi to Veracruz, and the sloop-of-war Falmouth to Alvarado.
