= USS Gwin (DD-433) =

Gleaves-class destroyer

Coordinates: 7°41′S 157°27′E

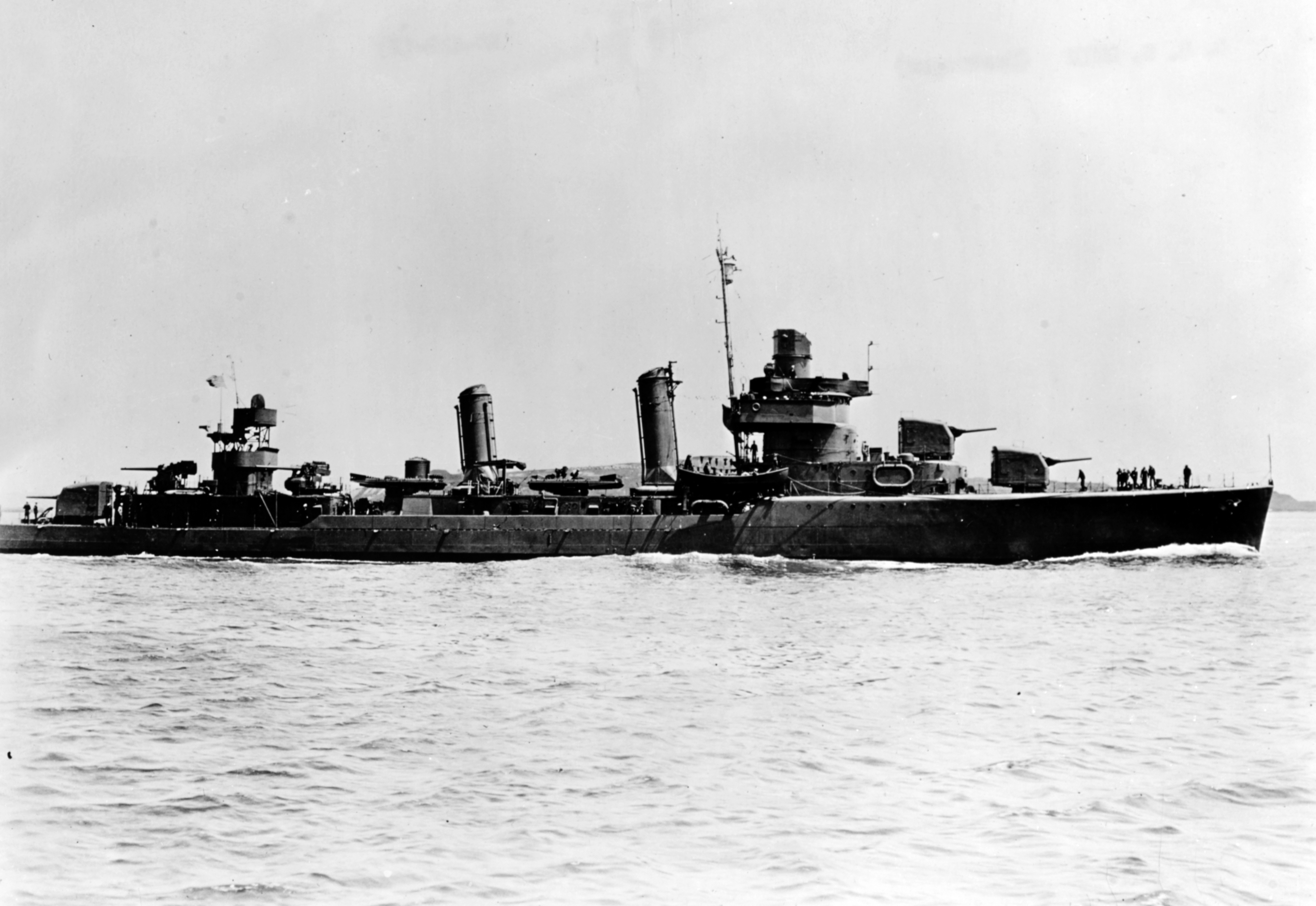
- USS Gwin underway in 1941

History

United States
- Name: Gwin
- Namesake: William Gwin
- Builder: Boston Navy Yard
- Laid down: 1 June 1939
- Launched: 25 May 1940
- Commissioned: 15 January 1941
- Honours and awards: 5 × battle stars
- Fate: Sunk at Battle of Kolombangara, 13 July 1943

General characteristics
- Class & type: Gleaves-class destroyer
- Displacement: 1,630 tons
- Length: 348 ft 3 in (106.15 m)
- Beam: 36 ft 1 in (11.00 m)
- Draft: 11 ft 10 in (3.61 m)
- Propulsion: 50,000 shp (37,000 kW); 4 boilers; 2 propellers
- Speed: 37.4 knots (69 km/h)
- Range: 6,500 nmi (12,000 km; 7,500 mi) at 12 kn (22 km/h; 14 mph)
- Complement: 16 officers, 260 enlisted
- Armament: 5 × 5 in (127 mm) DP guns, 6 × 20 mm AA guns, 6 × .50 cal (12.7 mm) guns, 10 × 21 in (533 mm) torpedo tubes, 2 × depth charge tracks

USS Gwin (DD-433), a Gleaves-class destroyer, was the third ship of the United States Navy to be named for Lieutenant Commander William Gwin, an American Civil War officer who commanded river boats against Confederate forces in Alabama.

Gwin was launched on 25 May 1940 by the Boston Navy Yard; sponsored by Mrs. Jesse T. Lippincott, second cousin of Lt.Comdr. Gwin. The destroyer was commissioned at Boston on 15 January 1941. Gwin was sunk by a torpedo launched by a Japanese destroyer during the Battle of Kolombangara in the Solomon Islands Campaign in July 1943.

== Service history ==
Gwin completed shakedown training on 20 April 1941 and underwent final alterations in the Boston Navy Yard before conducting a neutrality patrol throughout the Caribbean Sea. On 28 September 1941 she assumed identical service in the North Atlantic from her base at Hvalfjörður, Iceland. At the beginning of February 1942, she returned to the Eastern Seaboard through the Panama Canal to San Francisco, California.

=== Service in the Pacific Theatre ===
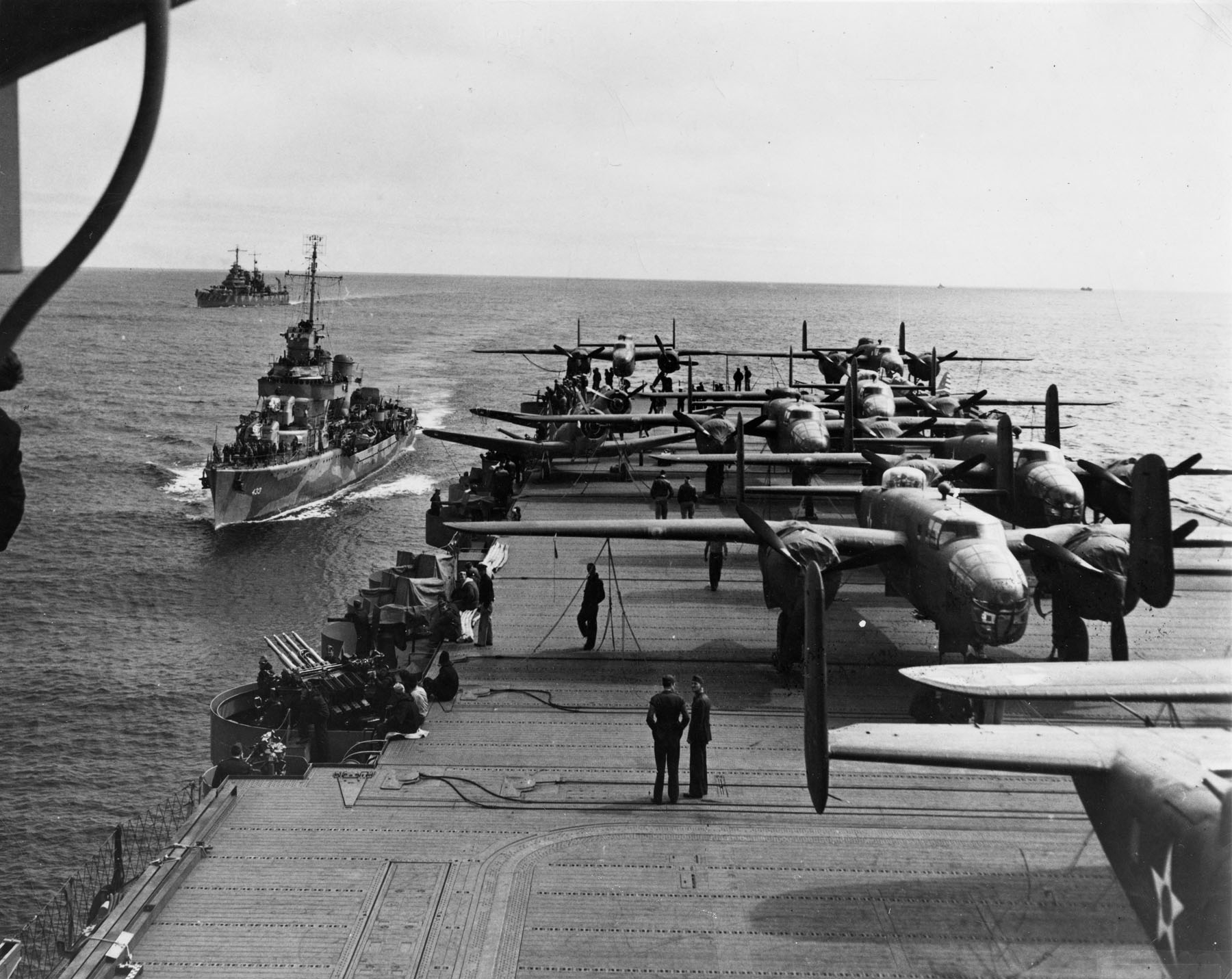
USS Gwin, alongside USS Hornet during the Doolittle Raid 1942

On 3 April 1942 Gwin stood out of San Francisco Bay as a unit of the escort for the aircraft carrier Hornet, which carried 16 Army B-25 bombers to be launched in a bombing raid on Tokyo. Admiral William F. Halsey in carrier Enterprise rendezvoused with the task force off Midway, and General Jimmy Doolittle's famed raiders launched the morning of 18 April when some 600 miles east of Tokyo. The task force made a rapid retirement to Pearl Harbor, then sped south 30 April 1942, hoping to assist carriers Yorktown and Lexington in the Battle of the Coral Sea. That battle concluded before the task force arrived, and Gwin returned to Pearl Harbor on 21 May for day and night preparations to meet the Japanese in the crucial battle for Midway Atoll.

=== Battle of Midway ===
Gwin departed Pearl Harbor 23 May 1942 with Marine reinforcements for Midway and returned to port 1 June. Two days later she raced to join the Fast Carrier Task Force searching for the approaching Japanese fleet off Midway. The battle was all but concluded by the time she arrived on the scene on 5 June 1942. Four large Japanese aircraft carriers and a cruiser rested on the bottom of the sea along with some 250 enemy planes and their crews. Gwin sent a salvage party to assist in attempts to save carrier Yorktown, heavily damaged by two bomb and two torpedo hits in the Battle of Midway. As attempts continued 6 June 1942, a Japanese submarine rocked Yorktown with torpedo hits and sank the destroyer Hammann which was secured alongside the carrier. The salvage party had to abandon Yorktown and surviving men were rescued from the sea, The carrier capsized and sank the morning of 7 June 1942. Gwin carried 102 survivors of the two ships to Pearl Harbor, arriving 10 June 1942.

=== Guadalcanal ===
Gwin departed Pearl Harbor 15 July 1942 to operate in the screen of fast carriers who pounded Japanese installations, troop concentrations and supply dumps as Marines invaded Guadalcanal in the Solomons on 7 August 1942. In the following months Gwin convoyed supply and troop reinforcements to Guadalcanal. Joining a cruiser–destroyer task force, she patrolled "the Slot" of water between the chain of Solomon Islands to intercept the "Tokyo Express" runs of supply, troop and warships supporting Japanese bases in the Solomons.

On 13 November 1942, Gwin and three other destroyers formed with battleships South Dakota and Washington to intercept an enemy bombardment–transport force approaching the Solomons. The following night the task group found the enemy off Savo Island: the battleship Kirishima, four cruisers, 11 destroyers, and four transports, The Naval Battle of Guadalcanal was intensely fought. Gwin found herself in a gun duel between the light cruiser Nagara and two Japanese destroyers (Ayanami and Uranami), versus the four American destroyers. She took a shell hit in her engine room. Another shell struck her fantail and enemy torpedoes began to boil around the destroyers.

Though shaken by exploding depth charges, Gwin continued to fire at the enemy as long as any remained within range. In a short time the other three American destroyers were out of action; two sinking and Benham surviving with her bow partially destroyed. Gwin attempted to escort the nose-less Benham to Espiritu Santo, New Hebrides Islands. But when all hope was lost, survivors transferred to Gwin who sank Benham's abandoned hulk with gunfire. The survivors were landed 20 November at Nouméa, New Caledonia, and Gwin was routed onward to Hawaii, thence to the Mare Island Navy Yard, arriving 19 December 1942.

=== Later action in the Solomons ===
Having been overhauled, Gwin returned to the Southwest Pacific on 7 April 1943 to escort troop reinforcements and supplies throughout the Solomons. On 30 June she served with the massive amphibious assault force converging on New Georgia under the leadership of Rear Admiral Richmond K. Turner. She supported the landings of 30 June on the north coast of Rendova Island, 5 miles (8.0 km) across Blanche Channel from Munda. Immediately after the first wave of troops hit Rendova Beach, Munda Island shore batteries opened fire on the four destroyers patrolling Blanche Channel. Gwin was straddled by the first salvo. A moment later a shell exploded on her main deck aft, killing three men, wounding seven and stopping her after engine. The half-dozen enemy shore batteries were soon silenced as Gwin laid down an effective heavy smoke screen to protect the unloading transports. When aerial raiders appeared, her gunners shot down three. Rendova Island was soon in American possession. It served as an important motor torpedo boat base to harass Japanese barge lines and a base for air support in the Solomons.

=== Sinking ===
Gwin escorted a reinforcement echelon from Guadalcanal to Rendova, then raced to the "Slot" 7 July to rescue 87 survivors of cruiser Helena, lost in the Battle of Kula Gulf. She then joined a cruiser–destroyer task force under Rear Admiral Walden L. Ainsworth to head off a formidable "Tokyo Express" force headed through the Solomon Islands to land troops at Vila. The Battle of Kolombangara was joined in the early hours of 13 July and Japanese light cruiser Jintsu was sunk by gunfire and torpedo hits. However, four Japanese destroyers, waiting for a calculated moment when Ainsworth's formation would turn, launched 31 torpedoes at the American formation. His flagship, Honolulu, cruiser St. Louis and Gwin, maneuvering to bring their main batteries to bear on the enemy, turned right into the path of the "long lance" torpedoes. Both cruisers received damaging hits but survived. Gwin received a torpedo hit amidships in her engine room and exploded. The destroyer Ralph Talbot took off Gwin's crew after their damage control efforts failed and she had to be scuttled. Two officers and 59 men perished with the destroyer.

Gwin received five battle stars for service in World War II.

== Bibliography ==
- Brown, David. Warship Losses of World War Two. Arms and Armour, London, 1990. ISBN 0-85368-802-8.
- Lundgren, Robert (2008). "Question 39/43: Loss of HIJMS Kirishima". Warship International. XLV (4): 291–296. ISSN 0043-0374.
