= David Conner (naval officer) =

United States Navy commodore

Commodore David Conner
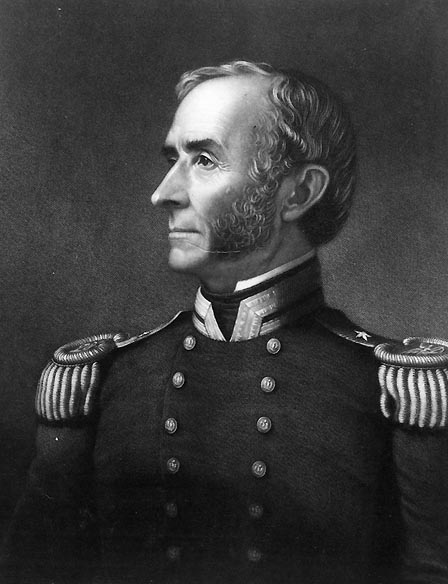
- Born: 1792; Harrisburg, Pennsylvania, U.S.
- Died: 20 March 1856 (aged 63–64); Philadelphia, Pennsylvania, U.S.
- Burial place: Laurel Hill Cemetery, Philadelphia, Pennsylvania, U.S.
- Military career
- Allegiance: United States
- Branch: United States Navy
- Service years: 1809–1847
- Rank: Commodore
- Conflicts: War of 1812; Mexican–American War • Siege of Veracruz

David Conner (1792 – 20 March 1856) was an officer and commodore of the United States Navy. He served in the War of 1812 and led the Home Squadron during the Mexican–American War. He led the successful naval assault during the siege of Veracruz which included the landing of 10,000 U.S. troops, the largest U.S. military amphibious assault at the time. He served on the Board of Navy Commissioners; as the first Chief of the Bureau of Construction, Equipment, and Repair; as a Special Diplomatic Agent to Mexico and commanded the Philadelphia Naval Yard.

== Early life ==
Conner was born in Harrisburg, Pennsylvania. He was the son of David Conner, an Irishman. He worked in Philadelphia and then joined the U.S. Navy on 16 January 1809. He served his first few years as a midshipman on the frigate President.

== Military career ==
During the War of 1812 Conner served in Hornet during her chase of HMS Belvidera and her actions with HMS Peacock in February 1813 and the March 1815 capture of HMS Penguin. During the capture of the Penguin he was severely wounded in the hip and his recovery took almost two years. He was held as a prisoner of war by the British. He received promotion to Lieutenant in July 1813.

In the decade following the war, Lieutenant Conner served in the Pacific, had shore duty at Philadelphia and commanded the schooner Dolphin. Attaining the rank of Commander in March 1825, he was Commanding Officer of the sloops of war Erie and John Adams before receiving promotion to Captain in 1835.

He served as a Navy Commissioner in 1841 and 1842, and upon the establishment of the bureau system in the Navy became the first Chief of the Bureau of Construction, Equipment, and Repair.

Conner was given the title Commodore, but his official naval rank remained unchanged. The title "commodore" added nothing to his pay or to his permanent rank of captain. Not until 1862, six years after Conner's death in 1856, did the title commodore come to signify a higher grade or an increased salary.

During the Mexican–American War, Commodore Conner commanded the Home Squadron which operated in the Gulf of Mexico in 1846 and 1847. He successfully disrupted Mexican trade in the Gulf of Mexico with the Blockade of Veracruz. He attempted an operation up the Alvarado River but had to withdraw due to the lack of shallow draft vessels. On November 14, 1846, he captured Tampico as a base for future operations. He also participated in the naval assault against the city of Veracruz. Conner directed the naval assault and landing of 10,000 U.S. troops which was the largest amphibious assault by the U.S. to date. Conner fell ill toward the end of the siege of Veracruz and was replaced by his vice commander Matthew C. Perry.

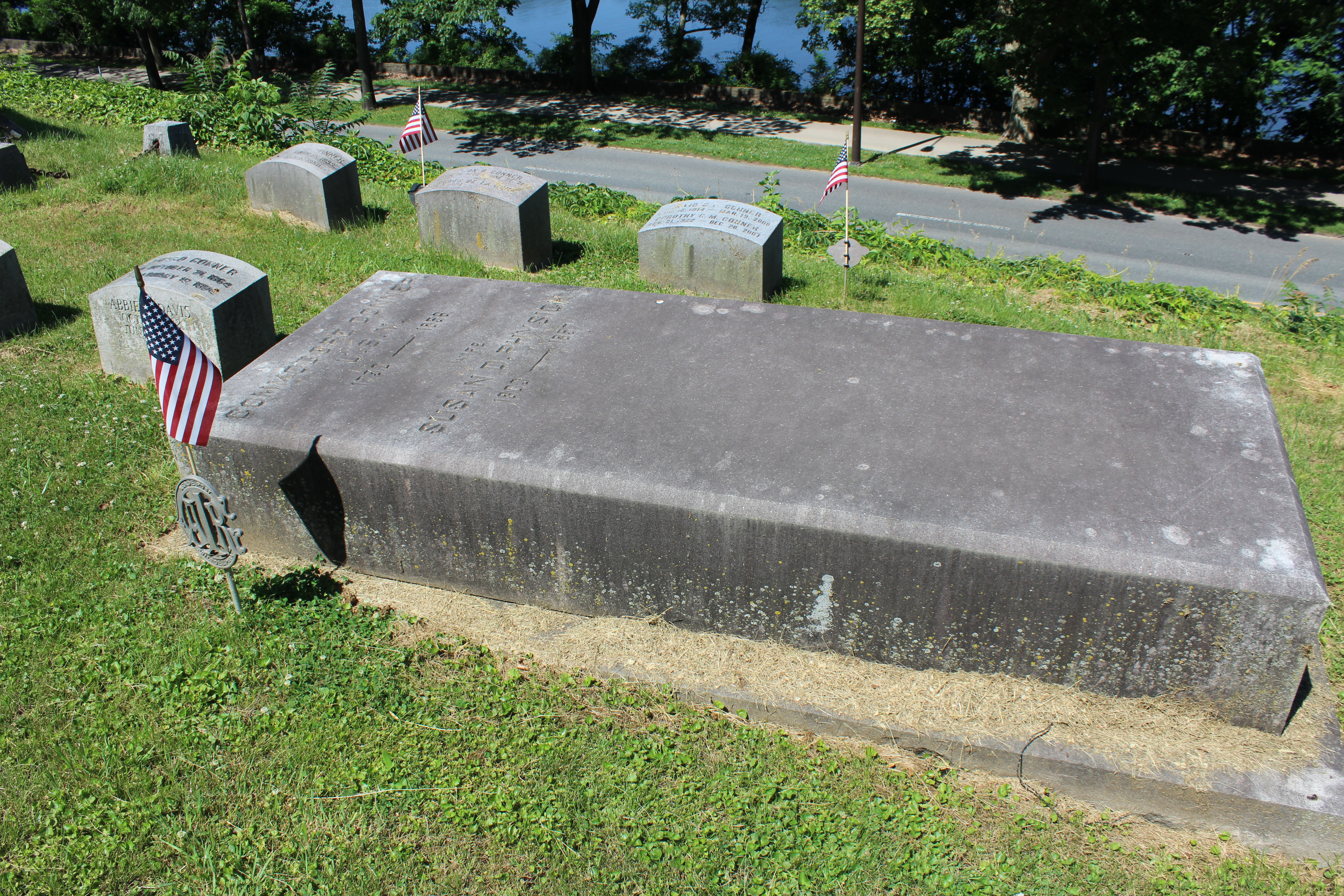
David Conner tombstone in Laurel Hill Cemetery

Leaving seagoing service soon afterwards, Conner was assigned as Special Diplomatic Agent to Mexico by President Polk and subsequently commanded the Philadelphia Navy Yard. Ill health, however, kept him from seeing much other active employment. Commodore Conner died at Philadelphia on 20 March 1856 at age 64 and was interred at Laurel Hill Cemetery.

== Legacy ==
Two destroyers of the United States Navy have been named in his honor. The USS Conner (DD-72) was a Caldwell-class destroyer in service from 1918 to 1940 and the USS Conner (DD-582) was a Fletcher-class destroyer in service from 1943 to 1946.
