= Wickes-class destroyer =

Destroyer class of the US Navy

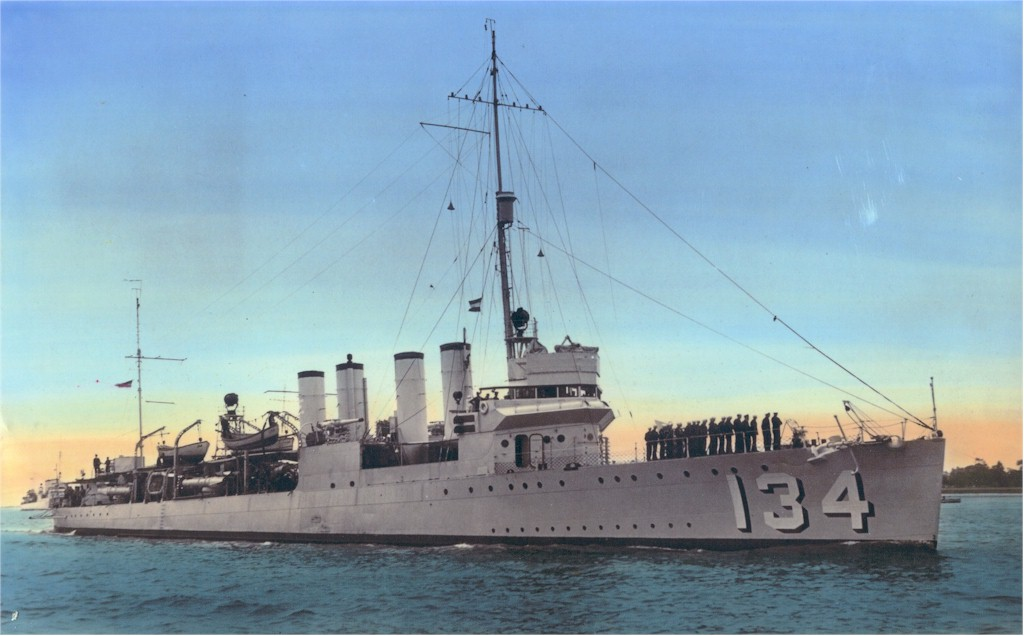
- USS Crowninshield

Class overview
- Name: Wickes class
- Builders: Bath Iron Works, ME; Charleston Naval Shipyard, SC; Bethlehem Steel Co.; Fore River Shipyard, Quincy, MA; Union Iron Works, San Francisco Shipyard, CA; Mare Island Naval Shipyard, CA; New York Ship, NJ; Newport News, VA; William Cramp & Sons, PA
- Operators: United States Navy; Royal Navy; Royal Canadian Navy; Soviet Navy; Royal Norwegian Navy; Royal Netherlands Navy
- Preceded by: Caldwell class
- Succeeded by: Clemson class
- Subclasses: Little (52 ships); Lamberton (11 ships); Tattnall (10 ships)
- Built: 1917–21
- In commission: 1918–46 (USN)
- Completed: 111
- Lost: 9 sunk in battle; 5 sunk as targets; 7 others sunk or destroyed in other ways
- Retired: 90 scrapped

General characteristics
- Type: Destroyer
- Displacement: 1,154 tons (normal); 1,247 tons (full load)
- Length: 314 ft 4.5 in (95.82 m)
- Beam: 30 ft 11.25 in (9.43 m)
- Draft: 9 ft (2.74 m)
- Propulsion: 4 × boilers, 300 psi (2,100 kPa) saturated steam; 2 Parsons geared steam turbines, 24,610 hp (18,350 kW); 2 shafts
- Speed: 35.3 kn (65.4 km/h; 40.6 mph)
- Complement: 100 officers and enlisted
- Sensors & processing systems: 1 × SC radar
- Armament: 4 × 4 in (102 mm)/50 caliber guns; 1 × 3 in (76 mm)/23 caliber AA gun; 4 × triple 21 in (533 mm) torpedo tubes
- Notes: popularly known as Flush Deckers, Four Pipers, Four-stackers, 1200-ton type

The Wickes-class destroyers were a class of 111 destroyers built by the United States Navy in 1917–1919. Together with the six preceding ships of the Caldwell class and the succeeding 156 subsequent Clemson-class destroyers, they were grouped as the "flush-deck" or "four-stack" type. Only a few were completed in time to serve in World War I, including USS Wickes, the lead ship of the class.

While some were scrapped in the 1930s, the rest served throughout World War II. Most of these were converted to other uses; nearly all in US service had half their boilers and one or more stacks removed to increase fuel and range or accommodate troops. Others were transferred to the British Royal Navy and the Royal Canadian Navy, some of which were later transferred to the Soviet Navy. All were scrapped within a few years after World War II.

== Background ==
The destroyer type was at this time a relatively new class of fighting ship for the US Navy. The type arose in response to torpedo boats that had been developing from 1865, especially after the development of the self-propelled Whitehead torpedo. During the Spanish–American War, it was realized that a torpedo boat destroyer was urgently needed to screen the larger warships, so much so that a special war plans board headed by Theodore Roosevelt issued an urgent report pleading for this type of ship.

A series of destroyers had been built over the preceding years, designed for high smooth water speed, with indifferent results, especially poor performance in heavy seas and poor fuel economy. The lesson of these early destroyers was the appreciation of the need for true seakeeping and seagoing abilities. There were few cruisers in the Navy, which was a fleet of battleships and destroyers (no cruisers had been launched since 1908) so destroyers performed scouting missions. A report in October 1915 by Captain W. S. Sims noted that the smaller destroyers used fuel far too quickly, and that wargames showed the need for fast vessels with a larger radius of action. As a result, the size of US destroyers increased steadily, starting at 450 tons and rising to over 1,000 tons between 1905 and 1916. The need for high speed, economical cruising, heavy seas performance, and a high fuel capacity saw larger hulls, the inclusion of oil fuel, reduction geared steam turbines with cruising turbines, and increased fuel capacity.

With World War I then in its second year and tensions between the US and Germany increasing, the US needed to expand its navy. The Naval Appropriation Act of 1916 called for a navy "second to none," capable of protecting both the Atlantic and Pacific coasts. The Act authorized the construction of ten battleships, six Lexington-class battlecruisers, ten Omaha-class scout cruisers, and 50 Wickes-class destroyers. A subsequent General Board recommendation for further destroyers to combat the submarine threat resulted in a total of 267 Wickes- and Clemson-class destroyers completed. However, the design of the ships remained optimized for operation with the battleship fleet.

== Design ==
The requirements of the new design were high speed and mass production. The development of submarine warfare during World War I created a requirement for destroyers in numbers that had not been contemplated before the war. A top speed of 35 knots (65 km/h) was needed for operation with the Lexington-class battlecruisers and Omaha-class cruisers.

The final design had a flush deck and four smokestacks. It was a fairly straightforward evolution of the preceding Caldwell class. General dissatisfaction with the earlier "1,000 ton" designs (Cassin and Tucker classes) led to the fuller hull form of the "flush deck" type. Greater beam and the flush deck provided greater hull strength. In addition, the Wickes class had 26,000 horsepower (19,000 kW) - 6,000 horsepower (4,500 kW) more than the Caldwell class - providing an extra 5 kn (9.3 km/h; 5.8 mph). The machinery arrangement of some of the Caldwells was used, with geared steam turbines on two shafts.

The extra power required an extra 100 tons of engine and reduction gears. The design included an even keel and nearly horizontal propeller shafts to minimize weight.

As construction was undertaken by ten different builders, there was considerable variation in the types of boilers and turbines installed to meet a guaranteed speed requirement. However, there were in essence two basic designs; one for the 52 ships built by the Bethlehem Steel yards (including Union Iron Works) and another used by the remaining shipyards (including the naval shipyards), which was prepared by Bath Iron Works. The Bethehem shipyards used Yarrow boilers (which proved relatively short-lived) and Curtis turbines, whereas the Bath designs utilized Normand, Thornycroft or White-Foster boilers, with Parsons turbines.

The Wickes class proved to be short-ranged, and its bridge and gun positions were very wet. The fleet found that the tapered stern, which made for a nice depth charge deployment feature, dug into the water and increased the turning radius, thus hampering anti-submarine work. The Clemson class added 100 tons of fuel tankage to improve operational range, but the issue of range was solved only with the development of underway replenishment in World War II.

== Armament ==
The main armament was the same as the Caldwell class: four 4-inch (102 mm)/50 caliber guns and twelve 21-inch (533 mm) torpedo tubes. While the gun armament was typical for destroyers of this period, the torpedo armament was larger than usual, in accordance with American practice at the time. A factor in the size of the torpedo armament was the General Board's decision to use broadside rather than centerline torpedo tubes. This was due to the desire to have some torpedoes remaining after firing a broadside, and problems experienced with centerline mounts on previous classes with torpedoes striking the gunwales of the firing ship. The Mark 8 torpedo was initially equipped, and probably remained the standard torpedo for this class, as 600 Mark 8 torpedoes were issued to the British in 1940 as part of the Destroyers for Bases Agreement.

Most ships carried a 3-inch (76 mm)/23 caliber anti-aircraft (AA) gun, typically just aft of the stern 4-inch gun. The original design called for two 1-pounder AA guns, but these were in short supply and the 3-inch gun was more effective. Anti-submarine warfare (ASW) armament was added during World War I. Typically, a single depth charge track was provided aft, along with a Y-gun depth charge projector forward of the aft deckhouse.

== Production ==
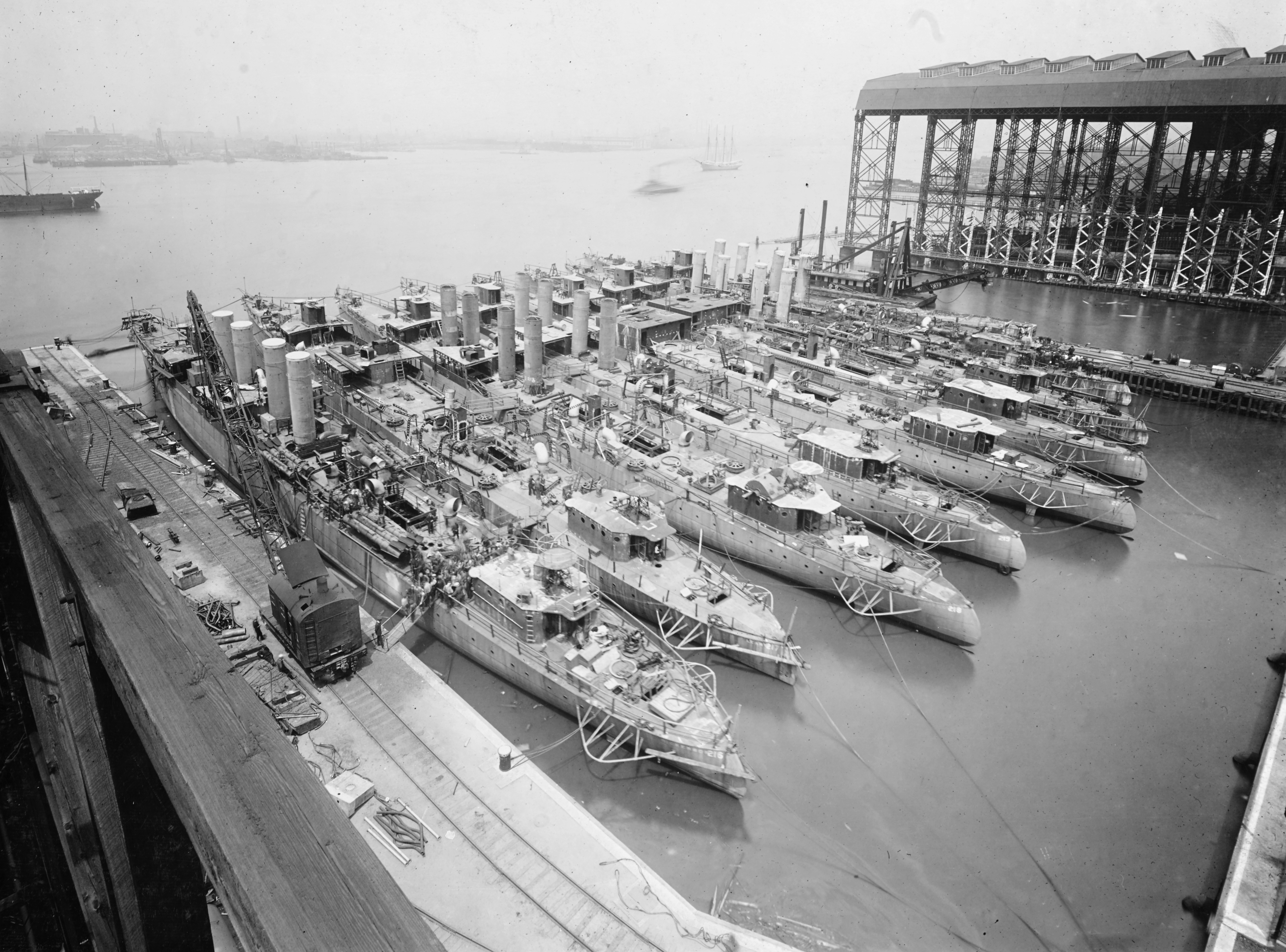
Eight destroyers of the Wickes class completed by New York Shipbuilding Corporation, Camden, New Jersey, 1919.

The United States Congress authorized 50 destroyers (35 later numbered DD 75 to 109) in the Act of 29 August 1916. However, the realization of the scope of the U-boat campaign resulted in a total of 111 being built, with DD 110 to 185 being authorized under the Act of 4 March 1917. The ships were built at Bath Iron Works, Bethlehem Steel Corporation's Fore River Shipbuilding Company, Union Iron Works, Mare Island Navy Yard, Newport News Shipbuilding, New York Shipbuilding, and William Cramp & Sons. In all, 267 Wickes and Clemson-class destroyers were built. This program was considered a major industrial achievement. Production of these destroyers was considered so important that work on cruisers and battleships was delayed to allow completion of the program. The first Wickes-class vessel was launched on 11 November 1917, with four more by the end of the year. Production peaked in July 1918, when 17 were launched - 15 of them on 4 July.

The program continued after the war ended: 21 of the Wickes class (and all but 9 of the Clemson class) were launched after the armistice on 11 November 1918. The last of the Wickes class was launched on 24 July 1919. This program left the US Navy with so many destroyers that no new destroyers were built until 1932 (the Farragut class).

== Ships in class ==
111 Wickes-class destroyers were built (with hull numbers DD 75 to 185).

=== Sub-classes ===
Some of these ships are also referred to as the Little class (52 ships - 26 built at Quincy and numbered DD 79 to 86, DD 95 to 102 and DD 161 to 170; and 26 built at San Francisco and numbered DD 87 to 92, DD 103 to 112 and DD 171 to 180), the Lamberton class (11 ships at Newport News - numbered DD 119 to 124 and DD 181 to 185), or the Tattnall class (10 ships built at Camden, New Jersey - numbered DD 125 to 130 and DD 157 to 160) in order to signify the yard that built them and to note the slight design differences from the Bath Iron Works ships (8 ships - DD 75 to 78 and DD 131 to 134). The 30 ships built by Cramp (21) and in the naval shipyards (9) were to the Bath design. Some of the non-Bath Iron Works units were actually commissioned prior to the lead ship, Wickes.

Due to these differences among what was nominally a single class, the actual dimensions and tonnages of these ships differed marginally between the designs for the ships produced by the different shipyards, as follows:

Hull Numbers	Shipbuilder	Length Overall	Extreme Breadth	Standard Displacement	Mean Draft	Normal Displacement	Mean Draft
DD 75 - 78	Bath Iron Works	314 ft 5 in	31 ft 8 in	1,090 tons	8 ft 8 in	1,154 tons	9 ft 0 in
DD 79 - 92	Bethlehem Steel ^{(a)}	315 ft 5 in	31 ft 8 in^{(b)}	1,060 tons	8 ft 6 in	1,191 tons	9 ft 2 in
DD 93 - 94	Mare Island Navy Yard	314 ft 5 in	31 ft 8 in	1,090 tons	8 ft 8 in	1,154 tons	9 ft 0 in
DD 95 - 112	Bethleham Steel	314 ft 5 in	31 ft 9 in	1,060 tons	8 ft 6 in	1,154 tons	9 ft 2 in
DD 113 - 118	William Cramp	314 ft 5 in	31 ft 8 in	1,090 tons	8 ft 8 in	1,154 tons	9 ft 1 in
DD 119 - 124	Newport News	314 ft 5 in	31 ft 8 in	1,090 tons	8 ft 8 in	1,213 tons	9 ft 4 in
DD 125 - 130	New York Sbdg	314 ft 5 in	31 ft 8 in	1,090 tons	8 ft 8 in	1,211 tons	9 ft 4 in
DD 131 - 134	Bath Iron Works	314 ft 5 in	31 ft 8 in	1,090 tons	8 ft 8 in	1,154 tons	9 ft 0 in
DD 135	Charleston Navy Yard	314 ft 5 in	31 ft 8 in	1,090 tons	8 ft 8 in	1,154 tons	9 ft 0 in
DD 136 - 141	Mare Island Navy Yard	314 ft 5 in	31 ft 8 in	1,090 tons	8 ft 9 in	1,154 tons	9 ft 2 in
DD 142 - 160	William Cramp	314 ft 5 in	31 ft 8 in	1,090 tons	8 ft 8 in	1,154 tons	9 ft 0 in
DD 161 - 180	Bethlehem Steel	314 ft 5 in	31 ft 8 in	1,060 tons	8 ft 6 in	1,191 tons	9 ft 2 in
DD 181 - 185	Newport News	314 ft 5 in	31 ft 8 in	1,060 tons	8 ft 6 in	1,213 tons	9 ft 4 in

Notes: (a) Bethlehem Steel includes both Fore River (Quincy) and Union Iron Works (San Francisco). (b) USS Colhoun (DD 85) had breadth 31 ft 9 in; USS Stevens (DD 86) had breadth 32 ft 0 i.

== Operations ==
=== In US service ===
A few Wickes class were completed in time for service in World War I, some with the battle fleet, some on convoy escort duty; none were lost. Altogether just 38 were in commission by Armistice Day, 11 November 1918. Two ships were lost soon after entering service; Woolsey sank after a collision in February 1921; DeLong ran aground in December 1921, was refloated and scrapped.

Many Wickes-class destroyers were converted to other uses, starting as early as 1920, when 14 were converted to light minelayers (hull classification symbol DM). Six of these were scrapped in 1932, and replaced by five additional conversions. Another four were converted to auxiliaries or transports at that time. Four Wickes-class DM conversions and four Clemson-class DM conversions survived to serve in World War II. During the 1930s, 23 more were scrapped, sold off, or sunk as targets. This was mostly due to a blanket replacement of 61 Yarrow-boilered destroyers 1930–31, as these boilers wore out quickly in service. Flush-deckers in reserve were commissioned as replacements.

Starting in 1940, many of the remaining ships were also converted. Sixteen were converted to high-speed transports with the designation APD. Eight were converted to destroyer minesweepers (DMS). Most ships remaining in service during World War II were rearmed with dual-purpose 3-inch (76 mm)/50 caliber guns for better anti-aircraft protection. The AVD seaplane tender conversions received two guns; the APD transport, DM minelayer, and DMS minesweeper conversions received three guns, and those retaining destroyer classification received six. Half of the torpedo tubes were removed in those retained as destroyers; all torpedoes were removed from the others. Nearly all had half the boilers removed, for increased fuel and range or to accommodate troops, reducing their speed to 25 knots (46 km/h; 29 mph).

The low-angle Mark 9 4-inch guns removed from these ships were transferred to defensively equipped merchant ships for anti-submarine protection.

Ward had an eventful career. She was built in record time: her keel was laid on 15 May 1918, launched only 17 days later on 1 June 1918, and commissioned 54 days after that on 24 July 1918. She is credited with firing the first US shots of the attack on Pearl Harbor on 7 December 1941, sinking a Japanese midget submarine with gunfire before the air attack started. The sinking was uncertain until the submarine's wreck was discovered in 2002. As the high-speed transport APD-16, she was damaged beyond repair by a kamikaze attack on 7 December 1944, and was sunk after abandoning ship by gunfire from the destroyer O'Brien, commanded at the time by Ward's former CO from the Pearl Harbor attack.

Thirteen Wickes class were lost during World War II in US service. The remainder were scrapped between 1945 and 1947.

=== In foreign navies ===
Twenty-three Wickes-class destroyers were transferred to the Royal Navy, and four to the Royal Canadian Navy, in 1940 under the Destroyers-for-bases deal. Together with ships from the Caldwell and Clemson classes they were grouped as 'Town-class destroyers'; divided into the Bath Iron Works design as "Type B" and the Bethlehem Steel as "Type C" Most of these ships were refitted much like the US destroyers and used as convoy escorts, but some were used very little and were not considered worth refitting. Buchanan, renamed HMS Campbeltown, was disguised as a German vessel and expended as a blockship in the St Nazaire Raid. (A newer Buchanan that was involved in the Japanese surrender formalities was a later ship.) One further destroyer was sunk; the remainder were scrapped between 1944 and 1947.

In 1944 seven were transferred by Britain to the Soviet Navy, in place of Italian ships claimed by the USSR after Italy's surrender. These vessels all survived the war, and were scrapped between 1949 and 1952.

== See also ==
- List of United States Navy losses in World War II
