= USS Wickes (DD-75) =

Wickes-class destroyer

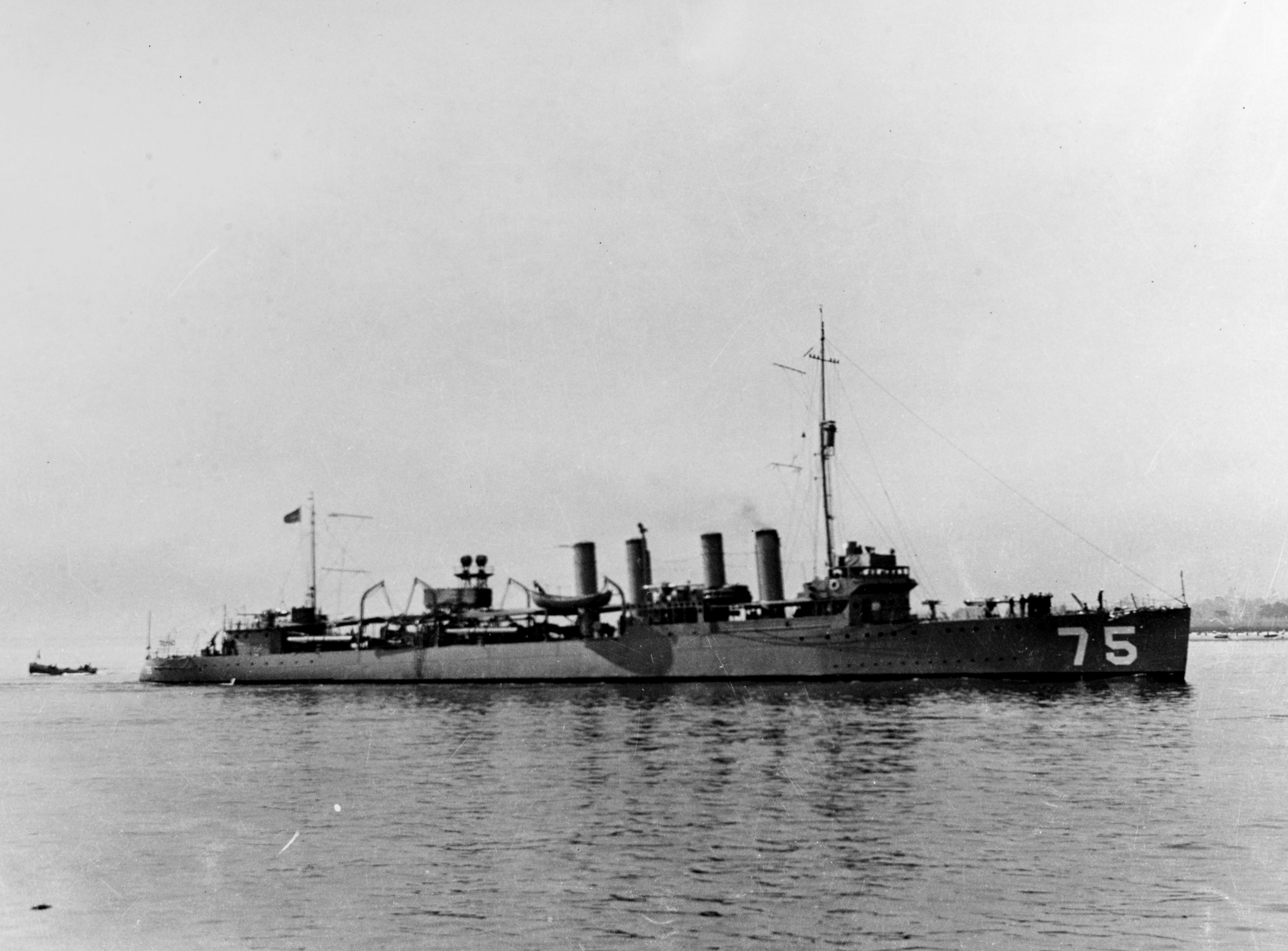
- Wickes in the early 1920s

History

United States
- Name: USS Wickes
- Namesake: Lambert Wickes
- Builder: Bath Iron Works
- Laid down: 26 June 1917
- Launched: 25 June 1918
- Commissioned: 31 July 1918
- Decommissioned: 15 May 1922
- Recommissioned: 26 April 1930
- Decommissioned: 6 April 1937
- Recommissioned: 30 September 1939
- Stricken: 8 January 1941
- Fate: Transferred to Royal Navy 23 October 1940

United Kingdom
- Name: HMS Montgomery
- Commissioned: 23 October 1940
- Fate: Scrapped, 10 April 1945

General characteristics
- Class & type: Wickes-class destroyer
- Displacement: 1,247 tons
- Length: 314 ft 4 1/2 in (95.822 m)
- Beam: 30 ft 11 1/4 in (9.430 m)
- Draft: 9 ft (2.7 m)
- Complement: 100 officers and enlisted
- Armament: 4 × 4-inch/50-caliber guns; 2 × 1-pounder guns; 12 × 21-inch (533 mm) torpedo tubes

The first USS Wickes (DD-75) was the lead ship of her class of destroyers in the United States Navy during World War I, later transferred to the Royal Navy as HMS Montgomery. She has been the only ship of the Royal Navy to bear the name Montgomery.

== United States Navy service ==
Wickes was laid down on 26 June 1917 at Bath, Maine, by the Bath Iron Works. The ship was launched on 25 June 1918; sponsored by Miss Ann Elizabeth Young Wickes, the daughter of Dr. Walter Wickes, a descendant of Lambert Wickes. The destroyer was commissioned on 31 July 1918.

=== World War I ===
After an abbreviated shakedown, Wickes departed Boston on 5 August and arrived at New York City on 8 August. Later that day, she sailed for the British Isles, escorting a convoy of a dozen merchantmen. After shepherding her charges across the Atlantic, Wickes was detached from the convoy to make a brief stop at Queenstown, Ireland, on 19 August. Underway again the following day, the warship sailed for the Azores to pick up passengers and United States-bound mail at Ponta Delgada before continuing on to New York.

Wickes subsequently escorted convoys off the northeast coast of the United States. She departed New York on 7 October, bound for Nova Scotia; but, during the voyage north, her crew was hit by influenza. Soon after the ship's arrival at Halifax, 30 men—including the commanding officer—were hospitalized ashore.

Soon the outbreak of flu in Wickes abated, but bad luck seemed to dog the destroyer. She departed New York at 1748 on 23 October, screening ahead of the armored cruiser Pueblo and escorting a convoy of merchant vessels. At 2104, Wickes sighted an unidentified ship to port on a collision course. She immediately changed her course and switched on her lights. When the oncoming ship failed to give way, the destroyer ordered full speed astern and went to general quarters. At 2110, only six minutes after the initial sighting, the unidentified ship's bow smashed into Wickes port billboard. The stem of the stranger cut through the destroyer's keel and caused extensive damage forward. There were no personnel casualties; and the flood was contained by a key bulkhead which held fast. In this case of "hit and run" on the high seas, the assailant remained unknown, since she scraped the destroyer's port side and steamed off into the night. Stopping engines at 2112, Wickes crew took stock of the damage and put about for the New York Navy Yard, where she arrived at 0453 on 24 October.

While the ship was undergoing repairs there, the signing of the armistice on 11 November 1918 stilled the guns of World War I. President Woodrow Wilson sailed for Europe in the transport George Washington; and Wickes served as part of the escort screen for the President's ship, departing from New York on 4 December 1918, bound for Brest, France.

=== 1918–22 ===
Wickes subsequently cruised to northern European ports in late 1918-—calling at Hamburg and Stettin, Germany; and Harwich, England. During this European cruise, while mooring at Hamburg on 3 March 1919, the destroyer collided with the German merchantman Ljusne Elf. After repairs, the destroyer shifted to Brest in June and from there escorted George Washington as that transport carried President Wilson back home to the United States.

After celebrating the 4 July 1919 off the Atlantic coast, Wickes and her sisters sailed for the Pacific, transiting the Panama Canal on 24 July 1919 with the mass movement of the ships from Atlantic to Pacific. Later in that year, Commander William F. Halsey took command of the ship, after an overhaul at the Mare Island Navy Yard. Halsey, who would win fame in World War II, later stated in his memoirs that Wickes was "the best ship I ever commanded; she was also the smartest and the cleanest." As flagship for Destroyer Division 10, Wickes operated off the west coast into 1922, conducting the usual target practices and exercises. As a wave of peacetime austerity swept over the United States, the Navy felt the "pinch" of decreased expenditures and the widespread antimilitary sentiment which cropped up in the aftermath of World War I. Accordingly, Wickes was decommissioned and placed in reserve at San Diego, California, on 15 May 1922.

=== 1923–40 ===
The destroyer lay out of commission for eight years. Recommissioned on 26 April 1930, Wickes shifted to the Atlantic and was based at New York. She operated off the eastern seaboard, making training cruises with Naval Reserve detachments from the 3d Naval District embarked. From 3 to 18 February 1931, the ship visited Tampa, Florida, for the Florida State Fair and Gasparilla Pirate Festival, before she shifted to Mobile, Alabama, to take part in Mardi Gras observances. In November, the busy destroyer visited Bridgeport, Connecticut, to participate in the Armistice Day observances on the 11th. During January and February 1932, the destroyer was attached to the Special Service Squadron operating in Central American waters and qualified for the Second Nicaraguan Campaign Medal. In April 1932, two years after being recommissioned, Wickes reported for duty with Rotating Reserve Squadron 20 and subsequently shifted back to the Pacific.

From 1933 to 1937, Wickes operated out of San Diego, commanded by Lt. Comdr. Ralph U. Hyde, ('17), with Lt. Milton E. Miles as Exec. Decommissioned on 6 April 1937, the destroyer remained in reserve only a short time because of the increase of tension in Europe and the Far East. Fighting broke out in Poland on 1 September 1939 as German forces invaded that country and thus triggered British and French assistance to Poland. World War II was on.

President Franklin Delano Roosevelt promptly directed that the Navy establish a "Neutrality Patrol" off the eastern seaboard, in the approaches to the Panama Canal and Guantánamo Bay, and at the two entrances to the Gulf of Mexico. To help patrol these stretches of sea, the Navy quickly reactivated 77 destroyers and light minelayers.

Wickes was recommissioned on 30 September 1939. Over the ensuing month, the destroyer was fitted out while moored at the destroyer base alongside Whitney. Early in November, she shifted to the Mare Island Navy Yard, Vallejo, California, for drydocking. After returning to San Diego on 21 November, Wickes departed the west coast on 27 November, bound for Panama in company with her division, Destroyer Division (DesDiv) 64. En route, she fueled from the oiler Neches and arrived at Balboa, Panama, on 6 December. Transiting the canal the next day, the destroyer arrived at the Naval Operating Base (NOB), Key West, Florida, on 11 December and commenced neutrality patrol duty.

Wickes and her sister ships patrolled alternately in the Yucatán Channel between the east coast of Cuba and the Yucatán Peninsula and in the passage between Florida and the west coast of Cuba. They shadowed belligerent merchantmen and warships of the British and Commonwealth navies searching for German freighters or passenger ships caught in or near American coastal waters by the outbreak of war.

On her first patrol, Wickes spotted a cruiser—possibly HMAS Perth or HMS Orion (her log is not specific here)—at 1058 on 14 December. The destroyer shadowed the cruiser, changing courses and speeds to conform to the other ship's movements, until well after nightfall. Anchored off Port Everglades, Florida, just before Christmas of 1939, Wickes noted the British destroyer HMS Hereward maintaining a diligent patrol 12 miles (19 km) off the Florida coast between 23 and 25 December.

Wickes returned to Key West on 30 December but enjoyed barely enough time to refuel and provision before she got underway again on 2 January 1940. She maintained a patrol off the Yucatán Peninsula for a week before returning to Key West on 9 January. Shifting to Guantánamo Bay soon thereafter, Wickes exercised with larger units of the Atlantic Squadron from 24 to 26 January before proceeding with DesDiv 64 for Puerto Cabello, Venezuela on 26 January. Arriving the following day, the ships commenced a three-day port visit.

After leaving Puerto Cabello, Wickes and her division mates visited St. Thomas, Virgin Islands, before joining DesDiv 65 at St. Eustatius, Dutch West Indies, on 6 February. The next day, these two divisions rendezvoused with the cruiser Wichita and DesDiv 82; together with DesDivs 61 and 83 and the heavy cruiser Vincennes, these ships formed the "Antilles Detachment" of the Atlantic Squadron. After formation steaming and exercises, Wickes arrived back at Guantánamo Bay on 9 February before shifting to NOB Key West on the 14th.

In late February, Wickes again patrolled the Florida Straits, visiting the Dry Tortugas in the course of her operations. At the end of March, she sailed on the Yucatán Patrol. Returning to Key West on 8 April, Wickes maneuvered alongside the destroyer Twiggs at the fuel pier there. The two ships touched and broke off the propeller guard from Twiggs which punctured a small hole above Wickes waterline. The damage was minor, and the destroyer returned to sea shortly thereafter to conduct short range battle practice off Key West before undertaking another stint on the Yucatán Patrol in mid-April.

From late April through mid-June, Wickes visited San Juan, Puerto Rico, and St. Thomas. She departed from the latter port on 1 July to join the battleships Texas, Arkansas, and New York that afternoon and conducted simulated torpedo attacks upon them at night. Wickes then operated out of San Juan for the remainder of the month.

Meanwhile, in Europe, the situation facing the British had materially worsened. The devastating German blitzkrieg had carried the Low Countries before it and knocked France out of the war. British destroyer forces had suffered terribly in the ill-fated Norwegian campaign and in the evacuation from Dunkirk. Moreover, German U-boats had taken their toll in their operations against British convoys. With Italy's entry into the war in the summer of 1940, the British were faced with another long lifeline to defend in the Mediterranean.

== Transfer to Britain ==
Prime Minister Winston Churchill appealed to President Roosevelt for assistance; and, during the summer of 1940, an agreement was worked out between the United States and Great Britain. In return for 50 "overage" American destroyers transferred to the Royal Navy, the United States received leases, for a duration of 99 years, on strategic base sites stretching from Newfoundland to British Guiana.

Accordingly, 50 ships were picked for transfer— Wickes among them. After her last Caribbean tour, the destroyer returned to Key West on 24 July. She shifted to Galveston, Texas, on 27 July for an overhaul at Todd's Drydock Company and remained there through August.

Wickes departed Galveston in company with the destroyer Evans, on 22 September, touched briefly at Key West, and arrived at the Norfolk Navy Yard, Portsmouth, Virginia, on 26 September. On 9 October, Wickes departed Hampton Roads with DesDiv 64 and stopped at the Naval Torpedo Station, Newport, Rhode Island, soon thereafter. The ships transited the Cape Cod Canal, en route to Provincetown, Massachusetts, and after stopping there briefly, pushed on for Halifax Nova Scotia, where they arrived on 16 October.

As part of the fifth group of destroyers transferred to the British and Canadians, Wickes was visited by Prime Minister Mackenzie King of Canada and Rear Admiral Ferdinand L. Reichmuth, USN, the Commander, Destroyers, Atlantic Fleet, on 19 October, during the indoctrination period for the prospective British crew. On 23 October 1940, Wickes was turned over to the Royal Navy. Her name was struck from the Navy List on 8 January 1941.

=== As HMS Montgomery ===
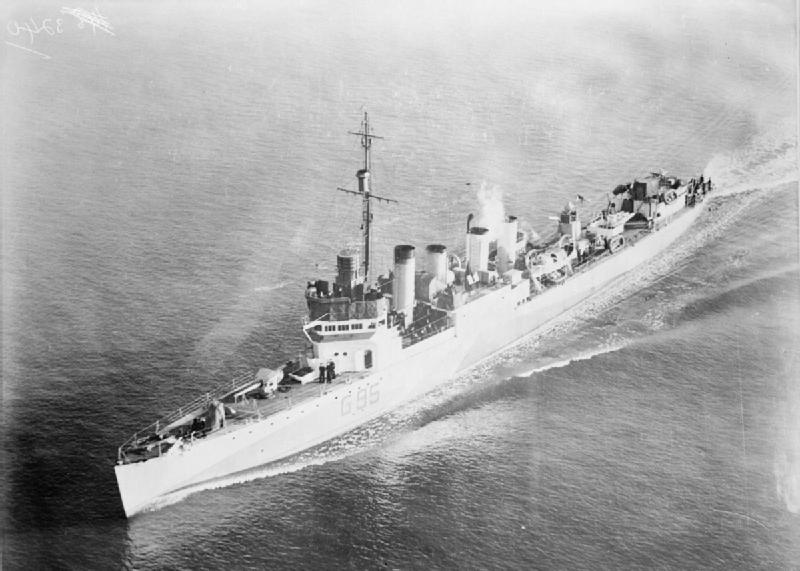
HMS Montgomery off Charleston

She was commissioned simultaneously on 23 January under the White Ensign as HMS Montgomery (G95).

The destroyer underwent further fitting out and familiarisation before departing Canadian waters on 1 November, bound for the British Isles. En route, Montgomery and the other of her sister ships in company swept through the scene of the one-sided naval engagement between the armed merchant cruiser HMS Jervis Bay and the German "pocket battleship" Admiral Scheer. This action had occurred on 5 November when the German warship attacked a convoy escorted by the erstwhile merchant steamship. Jervis Bay had interposed herself between the raider and the convoy, allowing the latter to escape while being herself sunk. Montgomery found nothing, however, and after searching briefly for the German "pocket battleship"—with orders to shadow by day and attack by night—arrived at Belfast, Northern Ireland, on 11 November.

Shifting to Plymouth, England, a week later, Montgomery was allocated to the Western Approaches command and based at Liverpool. During the course of one of her early patrols, Montgomery rescued 39 survivors from the motor tanker Scottish Standard which had been torpedoed and sunk by the U-96 on 21 February 1941. Disembarking the rescued mariners on 24 February, Montgomery resumed her Western Approaches patrols soon thereafter.

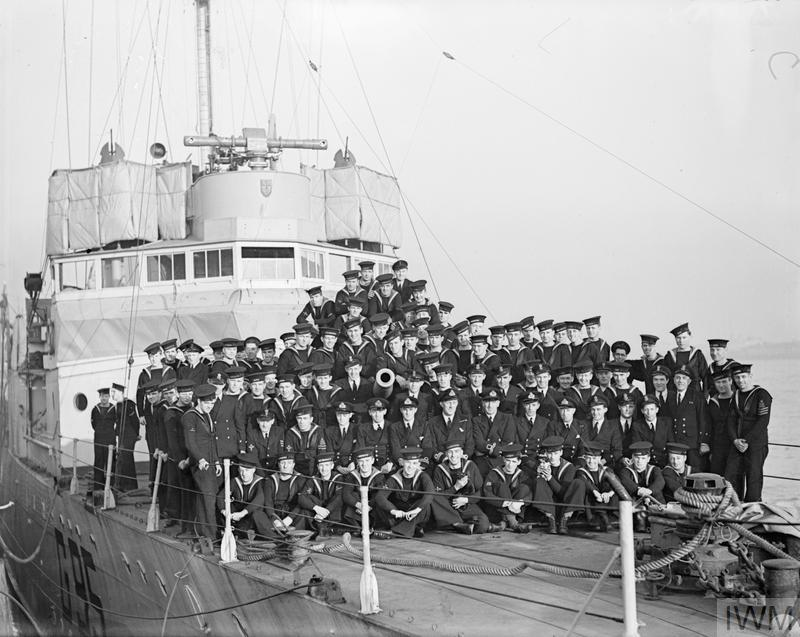
The officers and crew of HMS Montgomery at Gourock on the Firth of Clyde in November 1941.

The flush-decker underwent repairs at Barrow-in-Furness from April to September and was later assigned to the 4th Escort Group. Montgomery was modified for trade convoy escort service by removal of three of the original 4-inch/50-caliber guns and one of the triple torpedo tube mounts to reduce topside weight for additional depth charge stowage and installation of hedgehog. Based now at Greenock, the destroyer operated between the British Isles and Canadian ports through the end of 1941. On 13 January 1942, the Panamanian-registered steamer SS Friar Rock was torpedoed and sunk by U-130 100 miles (160 km) southeast of Cape Race, Newfoundland. Four days later, Montgomery picked up seven survivors from that ship.

In February 1942, Montgomery came under the aegis of the Western Local Escort Force at Halifax. Later in 1942, the destroyer was loaned to the Royal Canadian Navy before she sailed south and underwent repairs at the Charleston Navy Yard which lasted into the following year 1943. Resuming her coastwise convoy escort operations in February 1943, Montgomery rescued survivors of the torpedoed Manchester Merchant— sunk by U-628 on 25 February 1943, 390 miles (630 km) off Cape Race.

The destroyer remained with the Western Local Escort Force into late 1943, operating out of Halifax. On 12 December 1943, she assisted the Bowater-Lloyd Paper Co. barge Spruce Lake and, on 27 December, departed Halifax for the British Isles, carrying the surviving crew members from the torpedoed British destroyer HMS Hurricane which had been sunk by U-415 on 24 December.

Arriving in England soon thereafter, Montgomery was placed in reserve in the River Tyne on 23 February 1944. Removed from the "effective list"—the British equivalent of the United States Navy's "Navy List" – the veteran flush-decker was subsequently broken up for scrap in the spring of 1945 shortly before the end of the war in Europe.
