= USS Conner (DD-72) =

Caldwell-class destroyer

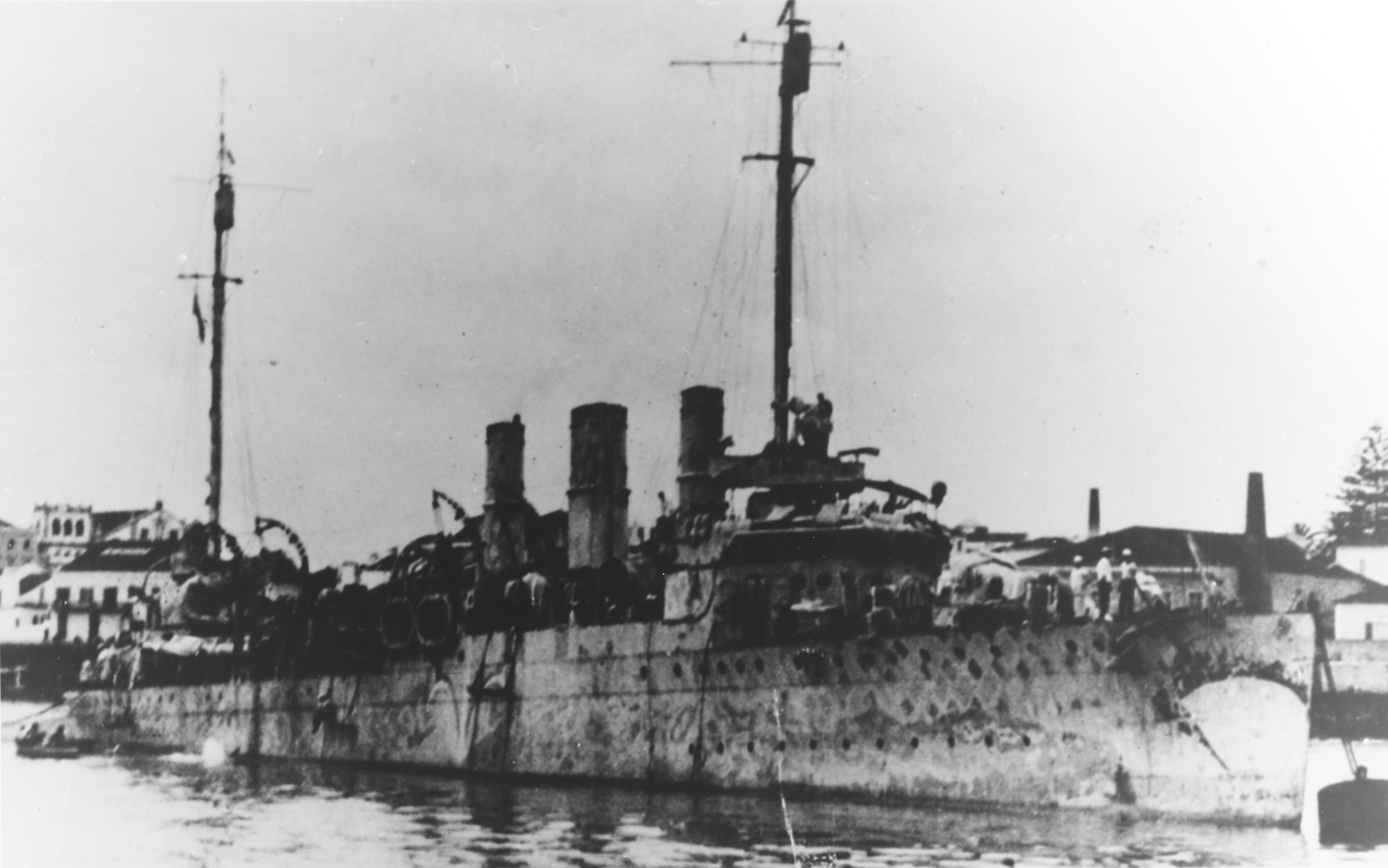
- USS Conner (DD-72)

History

United States
- Name: Conner
- Namesake: Commodore David Conner
- Builder: William Cramp & Sons, Philadelphia
- Yard number: 436
- Laid down: 16 October 1916
- Launched: 21 August 1917
- Commissioned: 12 January 1918
- Decommissioned: 21 June 1922
- Recommissioned: 23 August 1940
- Decommissioned: 23 October 1940
- Identification: DD-72
- Fate: Transferred to Royal Navy 23 October 1940

United Kingdom
- Name: Leeds
- Acquired: 23 October 1940
- Commissioned: 23 October 1940
- Identification: Pennant number: G27
- Fate: Sold for scrapping 4 March 1947

General characteristics
- Class & type: Caldwell-class destroyer
- Displacement: 1,020 tons (standard); 1,125 tons (normal)
- Length: 315 ft 6 in (96.16 m)
- Beam: 31 ft 4 in (9.55 m)
- Draft: 8 ft 1 in (2.46 m)
- Propulsion: White-Forster boilers; Parsons turbines; three shafts; 18,500 hp (13,800 kW)
- Speed: 30 knots (56 km/h; 35 mph)
- Complement: 100 officers and enlisted
- Armament: 4 × 4 in (100 mm) 21 pdr gun; 1 × 6 in (152 mm) Y-gun; 12 × 21 inch (533 mm) torpedo tubes

USS Conner (DD-72), a Caldwell-class destroyer, served in the United States Navy, and later in the Royal Navy as HMS Leeds.

== Construction and commissioning ==
The first US Navy ship named for Commodore David Conner (1792–1856), Conner was launched on 21 August 1917 by William Cramp & Sons Ship and Engine Building Company at Philadelphia, Pennsylvania and commissioned on 12 January 1918.

== Technical characteristics ==
Conner was 315 feet 6 inches (96.16 m) long overall and 310 feet (94.49 m) at the waterline, with a beam of 30 feet 7 inches (9.32 m).

== Service history ==
=== United States Navy ===
Conner put to sea from New York City on 12 May 1918 to escort a convoy to the Azores and Brest, France. From Brest, she operated with U.S. Naval Forces, France, escorting convoys inbound to British and French ports, and outbound for Bermuda. Frequently sent to aid ships which had reported sighting Imperial German Navy submarines, she rescued survivors from the sea twice in July 1918. At the end of World War I, she had duty on regular mail and passenger runs between Brest and Plymouth, England, and on 8 May 1919, she put out from Plymouth escorting the ships carrying President Woodrow Wilson and United States Secretary of the Navy Josephus Daniels to Brest for the Paris Peace Conference.

Returning to the United States, Conner joined in fleet maneuvers in Narragansett Bay off Rhode Island in the summer of 1919, and entered the Philadelphia Navy Yard at Philadelphia on 4 October 1919. Later she lay in reserve at Norfolk, Virginia, until May 1921, when she participated in large-scale fleet exercises with a reduced complement. She remained at Newport, Rhode Island, for operations with submarines. Between 13 October 1921 and 29 March 1922, she lay at Charleston, South Carolina, returning then to Philadelphia, where she was decommissioned on 21 June 1922.

In July 1940, the US Navy ordered Conner to be rearmed as an escort vessel, with two sets of torpedo tubes and the aft 4-inch gun to be replaced by 3-inch/50 caliber anti-aircraft guns. This process was interrupted by the decision to transfer 50 old destroyers, including Conner, to the United Kingdom under the Destroyers for Bases Agreement. Conner was recommissioned on 23 August 1940 and fitted out at Philadelphia. Designated for inclusion in the fulfillment of the Destroyers for Bases Agreement, she proceeded to Halifax, Nova Scotia, Canada, where she was decommissioned 23 October 1940.

=== Royal Navy ===
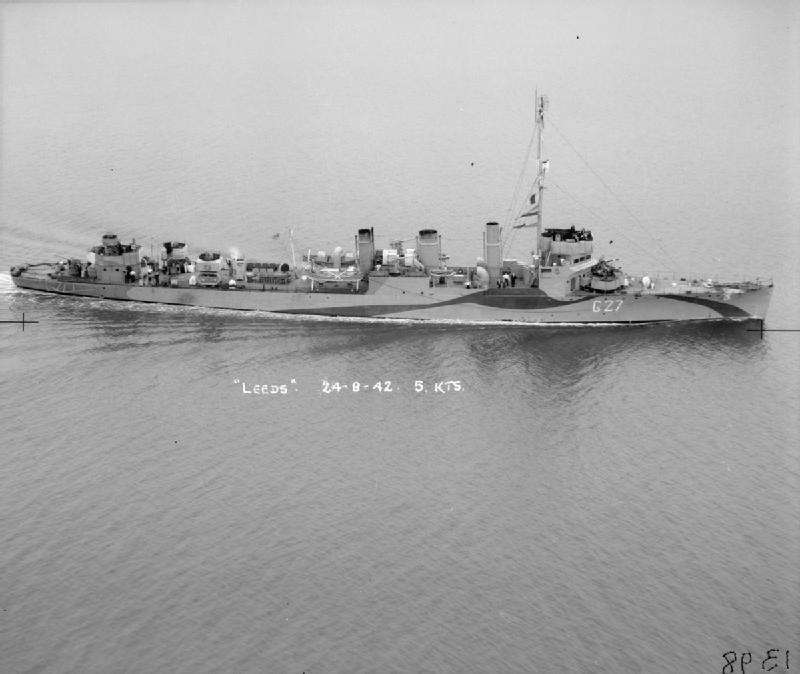
HMS Leeds

The destroyer was transferred to the United Kingdom and commissioned in the Royal Navy as HMS Leeds on 23 October 1940, the day of her transfer.

Leeds cleared Halifax on 1 November 1940 bound for Belfast, Northern Ireland, where she arrived on 10 November 1940. Under the Rosyth Command, she escorted convoys in the North Sea between the Thames and the Firth of Forth, successfully weathering many air attacks. On 20 April 1942, she went to the aid of the destroyer HMS Cotswold, towing her into Harwich. She drove German E-boats away from her convoy on the night of 24–25 February 1944.

Leeds was placed in reserve at Grangemouth on the Firth of Forth in April 1945. She was sold for scrapping on 4 March 1947 and broken up.
