= William Gwin (naval officer) =

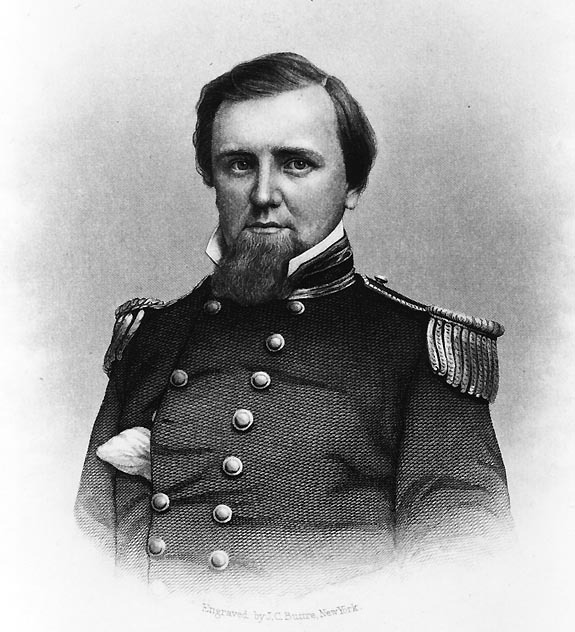
- Engraving of William Gwin by J.C. Buure, New York
- Born: December 6, 1832; Columbus, Indiana
- Died: January 3, 1863 (aged 30); Mississippi River
- Military career
- Allegiance: United States of America
- Branch: United States Navy
- Service years: 1847–1863
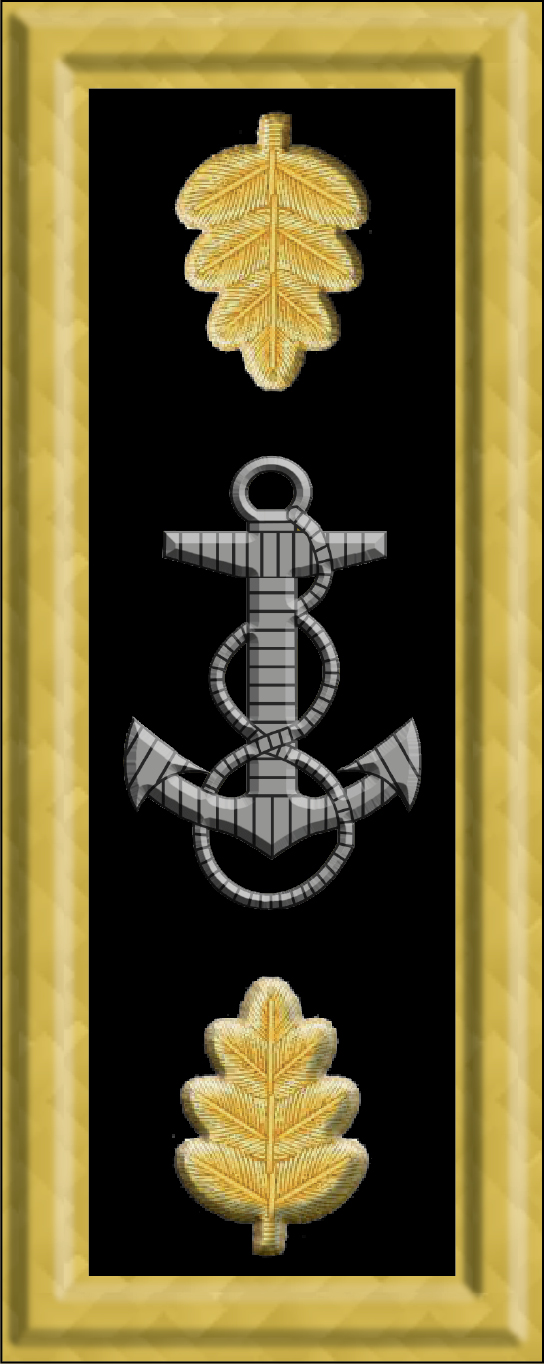
- Rank: Lieutenant commander
- Commands: USS Tyler; USS Mound City; USS Benton
- Conflicts: American Civil War

William Gwin (6 December 1832 – 3 January 1863) was an officer in the United States Navy who was killed in action during the American Civil War. One of the most promising officers in the nation, with extensive command and combat experience, Gwin had risen to the rank of lieutenant commander by the time of his death.

== Early life and career ==
Born in Columbus, Indiana, Gwin was appointed a midshipman on 7 April 1847. Gwin subsequently served in the frigate Brandywine on the Brazil Squadron until late in 1850. During the next five years he was assigned to the sloop of war Germantown, flagship of the African Squadron, the steamer Princeton and the brig Bainbridge. In September 1855, while serving in the latter, he was promoted to the rank of Lieutenant. From late 1857 until after the outbreak of the American Civil War in the spring of 1861, Gwin was an officer of the steamer Saranac and sloop of war Vandalia, both in the Pacific, and of the steam frigate Susquehanna in the Mediterranean.

== Civil War ==
Returning to the United States in mid-1861, Lieutenant Gwin began Civil War combat service in the newly acquired cruiser Cambridge and, later in the year, was assigned to the brig Perry.

He commanded several ships of the Mississippi Squadron and was one of Flag Officer Andrew Hull Foote's "can do" officers, displaying outstanding initiative, energy and dash. After the fall of Fort Henry he swept with his wooden gunboats up the Tennessee River all the way to regions of Alabama. This action was a major factor in the collapse of the Confederate lines far behind him in Kentucky. Fire support from two of his gunboats, Tyler and Lexington, helped save Union troops from disaster in the Battle of Shiloh, bringing high praise from General Ulysses S. Grant. He was wounded in action 27 December 1862, while commanding the gunboat Benton in the Battle of Haines Bluff on the Yazoo River.

He died from these injuries on 3 January 1863, on board a hospital ship in the Mississippi River. In reporting his death to the Navy Department, Gwin's squadron commander, Rear Admiral David Dixon Porter, remarked: "The country has lost one of its bravest officers."

== Namesakes ==
Four ships have been named USS Gwin for him.
