= Flush deck =

Term in naval architecture

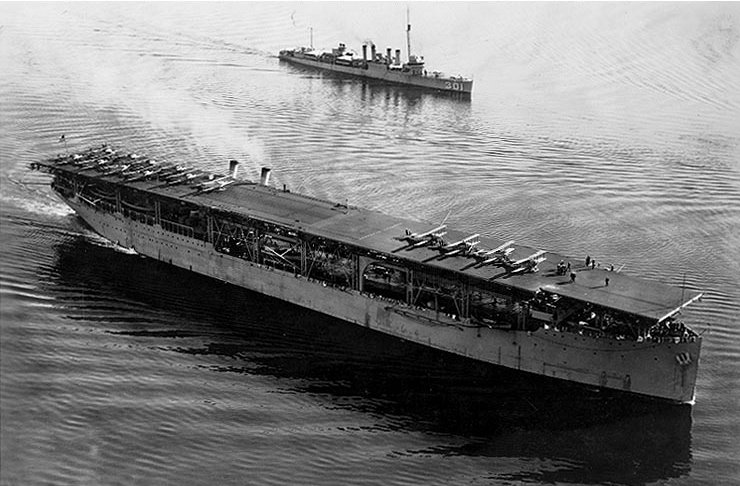
USS Langley was a flush-deck aircraft carrier

In naval architecture, a flush deck is a ship deck that is continuous from stem to stern.

== History ==
Flush decks have been in use since the times of the ancient Egyptians. Greco-Roman triremes often had a flush deck but may have also had a fore and aft castle deck. Flush decks were also common on medieval and Renaissance galleys but some also featured fore and aft castle decks. The medieval brigantine and later brig and snow ships also featured flush decks.

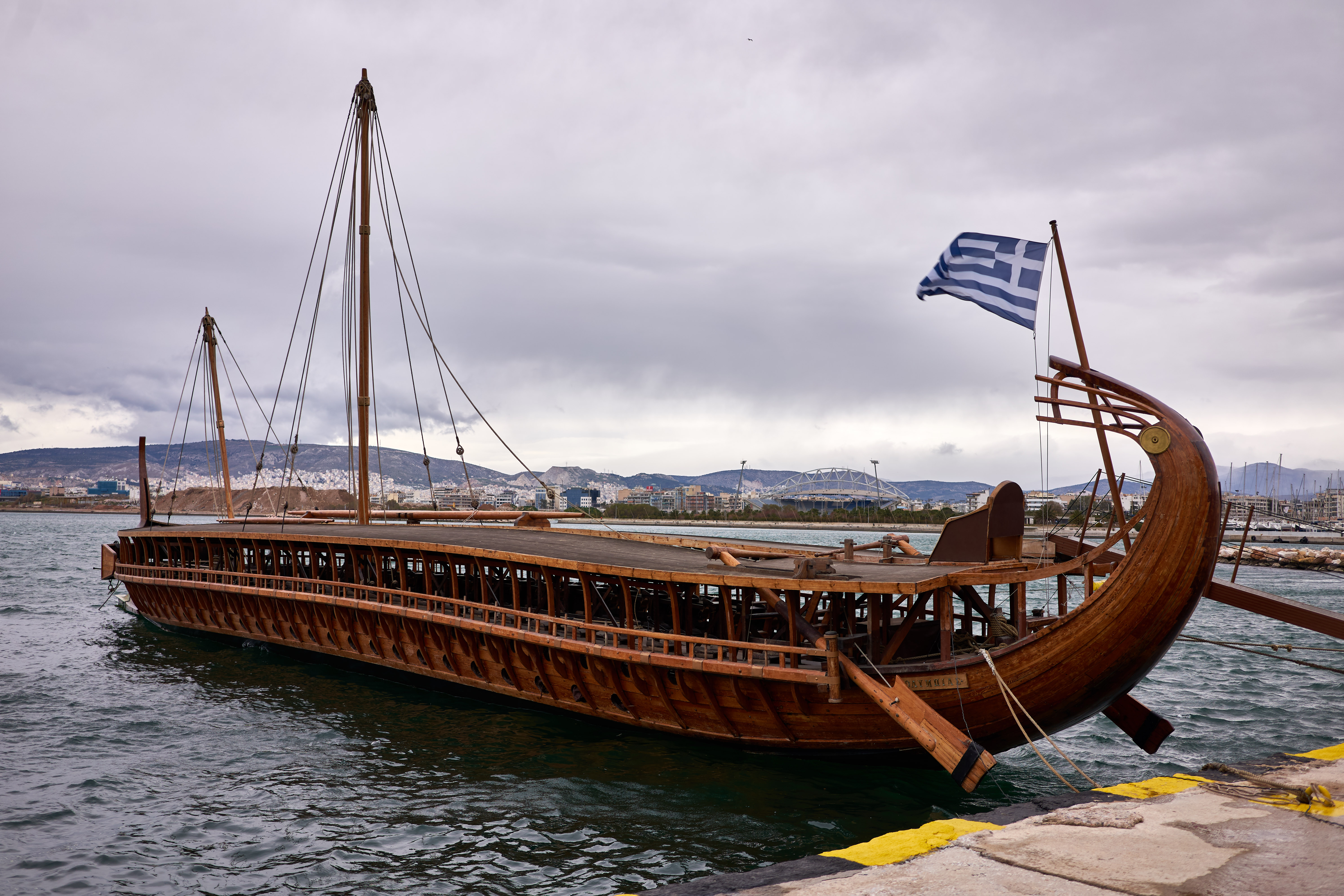
Greek ship Olympias with a flush deck

== Two different meanings of "flush" ==
"Flush deck" with "flush" in its generic meaning of "even or level; forming an unbroken plane", is sometimes applied to vessels, as in describing yachts lacking a raised pilothouse for instance. "Flush deck aircraft carrier" uses "flush deck" in this generic sense.

"Flush deck" in its more specific maritime-architecture sense signifies that the main deck runs the length of the ship and does not end before the stem (with a separate raised forecastle deck forward) or before the stern (with a separate raised or, as seen on many modern warships, lowered quarterdeck rearward). The flush decks are broken by masts, guns, funnels, and other structures and impediments, and are far from being unbroken planes.

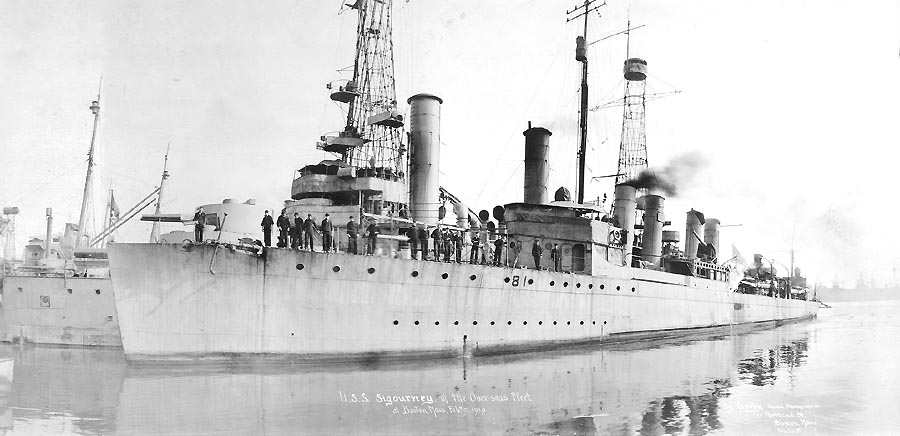
The flush-deck USS Sigourney (later HMS Newport) has no distinct forecastle or quarterdeck platform.

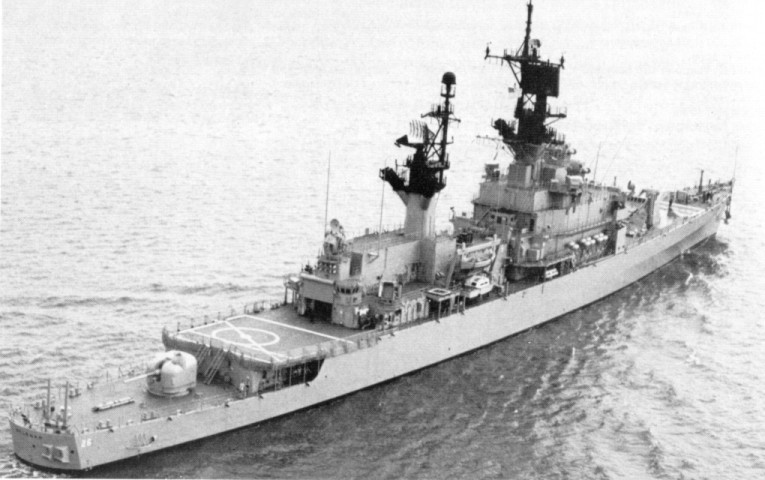
USS Belknap, a non-flush-deck ship, has the main deck giving way to a lower quarterdeck towards the stern

== Types ==
Flush deck aircraft carriers are those with no island superstructure, so that the top deck of the vessel consists of only an unbroken flight deck.

"Flush deckers" is a common nickname for a series of American destroyers built in large quantities during or shortly after World War I – the Caldwell, Wickes, and Clemson classes – so called because they lacked the raised forecastle of preceding American destroyers, thus the main deck was a flush deck.
