= Caldwell-class destroyer =

Destroyer class of the US Navy

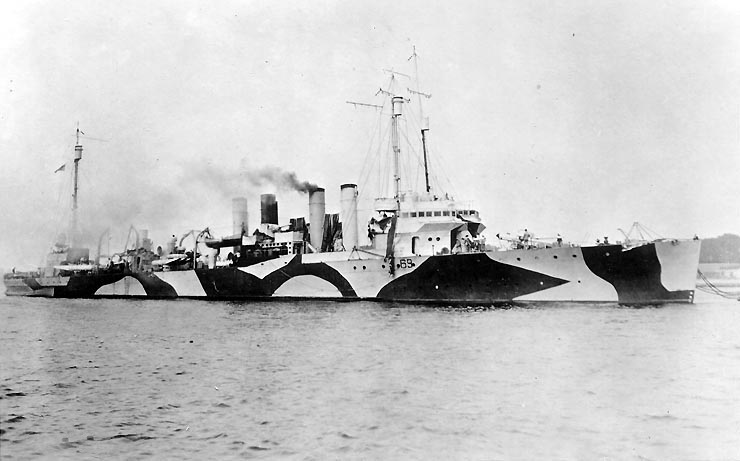
- USS Caldwell (DD-69) in harbor in 1919

Class overview
- Name: Caldwell class
- Builders: Mare Island Navy Yard; Norfolk Navy Yard; Seattle Dry Dock Company; William Cramp & Sons; Bath Iron Works
- Operators: United States Navy; Royal Navy
- Preceded by: Sampson class
- Succeeded by: Wickes class
- Subclasses: Town class
- Built: 1916–20
- In commission: 1917–45
- Completed: 6
- Retired: 6

General characteristics
- Type: Destroyer
- Displacement: 1,020 tons (standard); 1,125 tons (normal)
- Length: 308 ft (94 m) waterline; 315 ft 6 in (96.16 m) overall
- Beam: 31 ft 3 in (9.53 m)
- Draft: 8 ft (2.4 m); 11 ft 6 in (3.51 m) max
- Propulsion: (DD 69-71, 74) Thornycroft boilers; Parsons geared steam turbines; two shafts (20,000 shp (15 MW)); (DD 72-73) White-Forster boilers; Parsons direct drive turbines; three shafts (18,500 hp (13.8 MW))
- Speed: (DD 69-71, 74) 32 kn (59 km/h); (DD 72-73) 30 kn (56 km/h)
- Complement: 146
- Armament: 4 × 4 in (102 mm)/50 caliber guns; 1 × 3 in (76 mm)/23 caliber gun; 12 × 21 in (533 mm) torpedo tubes (4 × 3)

The Caldwell class was a class of six "flush deck" United States Navy destroyers built during World War I and shortly after. Four served as convoy escorts in the Atlantic; the other two were completed too late for wartime service. Two were scrapped during the 1930s, but four survived to serve throughout World War II, three of these in service with the Royal Navy under the Destroyers for Bases Agreement and the fourth as a high speed transport.

== Design and construction ==
The six Caldwell-class torpedo boat destroyers were authorized by Congress under the Act of 3 March 1915, "to have a speed of not less than thirty knots per hour [sic] and to cost, exclusive of armor and armament, not to exceed $925,000.00 each ...Provided, that three of said torpedo-boats herein authorized shall be built on the Pacific Coast."

Built from 1916 to 1918, the six ships of the Caldwell class were the first of 279 ordered (6 of which were cancelled) to a flush-decked design to remove the forecastle break weakness of the preceding Sampson class and other "thousand tonners". They were effectively prototypes of the mass production Wickes and Clemson-class vessels which followed them, although somewhat slower (30–32 knots (56–59 km/h) vs. 35 knots (65 km/h)) and differing in some details. The forward sheer of the Caldwell class was improved to keep "A" mount from being constantly washed out; however, this was unsuccessful. The Caldwells had a cutaway stern rather than the cruiser stern of the later ships, and thus had a tighter turning radius than their successors. The armament of the Sampsons was retained, but the broadside 4-inch (102 mm) guns were relocated to "bandstands" aft of the bridge. There were differences in appearance; Caldwell, Craven and Manley were built with four "stacks" (funnels), while Gwin, Conner and Stockton had only three. The middle stack of the three-stack ships was wider due to combining two boiler uptakes. Once the mass-production destroyers made the design prevalent, the Caldwells and their successors became known as "flush-deck" or "four-stack" destroyers.

Manley was converted to a prototype high-speed destroyer transport (hull classification symbol APD) in 1939, with her forward stacks and boilers removed to give her the capacity to lift 200 Marines and four 11 m (36 ft) Higgins assault boats (LCP(L), LCP(R), or LCVP). She saw action at Guadalcanal, Kwajalein, Saipan, and the Philippines.

Three entered Royal Navy service in 1940 under the Destroyers for Bases Agreement as part of the Town class. Conner, serving as HMS Leeds, provided cover at Gold Beach on 6 June 1944; her sisters served as convoy escorts. All three survived the war, two being sunk as targets and one scrapped, postwar.

== Armament ==
The armament repeated that of the preceding Sampson-class of "thousand tonners", and would be retained in the subsequent mass production "flush deckers". While the gun armament was typical for destroyers of this period, the torpedo armament of twelve 21-inch (533 mm) torpedo tubes was larger than usual, in accordance with American practice at the time. A factor in the size of the torpedo armament was the General Board's decision to use broadside rather than centerline torpedo tubes. This was due to the desire to have some torpedoes remaining after firing a broadside, and problems experienced with centerline mounts on previous classes with torpedoes striking the gunwales of the firing ship. The Mark 8 torpedo was equipped. The "bandstand" location of the waist 4-inch guns kept the mounts dry, but restricted the firing arc.

These ships carried a 3-inch (76 mm) 23 caliber anti-aircraft (AA) gun, typically just aft of the bow 4-inch gun. The original design called for two 1-pounder AA guns, but these were in short supply and the 3-inch gun was more effective. Anti-submarine (ASW) armament was added during World War I, or included in the initial design with DD-70 and DD-71. Typically, a single depth charge rack was provided aft, along with a Y-gun depth charge projector forward of the aft deckhouse.

== Engineering ==
As a somewhat experimental class, the Caldwells differed in their engineering. Conner and Stockton, built by Cramp, followed the class's original design, with three-shaft direct drive steam turbines. A high-pressure turbine on the center shaft exhausted to low-pressure turbines on the outboard shafts. A geared cruising turbine was provided on the center shaft for fuel economy at low and moderate speeds. Caldwell had two shafts with two Curtis geared turbines and two separate cruising turbines. The latter were connected via an experimental "electric speed reducing gear", a forerunner of the turbo-electric drive that would be used on several US battleships and aircraft carriers built from World War I through the 1920s. With a further increase in horsepower, this geared turbine arrangement was adopted for the later mass-production classes. The remaining ships had two shafts with geared turbines and no cruising turbines. This arrangement saw an increase from 18,500 to 20,000 shaft horsepower (13,800 to 14,900 kW) and the ships' speed from 30 to 32 knots (56 to 59 km/h; 35 to 37 mph).

== Ships in class ==
Ships of the Caldwell destroyer class
Hull no.	Name	Builder	Laid down	Launched	Comm- issioned	Decomm- issioned	Fate	Service notes
DD-69	Caldwell	Mare Island Navy Yard	8 December 1916	10 July 1917	1 December 1917	27 June 1922	Scrapped 1936	
DD-70	Craven	Norfolk Navy Yard	20 November 1917	29 June 1918	19 October 1918	15 June 1922	Scuttled May 1946	Transferred to Royal Navy as HMS Lewes
DD-70	Craven	Norfolk Navy Yard	20 November 1917	29 June 1918	9 August 1940	23 October 1940	Scuttled May 1946	Transferred to Royal Navy as HMS Lewes
DD-71	Gwin	Seattle Dry Dock Company	21 June 1917	22 December 1917	20 March 1920	28 June 1922	Scrapped 1939	
DD-72	Conner	William Cramp & Sons	16 October 1916	21 August 1917	12 January 1918	21 June 1922	Scrapped March 1947	Transferred to Royal Navy as HMS Leeds
DD-72	Conner	William Cramp & Sons	16 October 1916	21 August 1917	23 August 1940	23 October 1940	Scrapped March 1947	Transferred to Royal Navy as HMS Leeds
DD-73	Stockton	William Cramp & Sons	16 October 1916	17 July 1917	26 November 1917	26 June 1922	Scuttled July 1945	Transferred to Royal Navy as HMS Ludlow
DD-73	Stockton	William Cramp & Sons	16 October 1916	17 July 1917	16 August 1940	23 October 1940	Scuttled July 1945	Transferred to Royal Navy as HMS Ludlow
DD-74	Manley	Bath Iron Works	22 August 1916	23 August 1917	15 October 1917	14 June 1922	Scrapped 1946	Re-designated AG-28 on 28 November 1938; Re-designated APD-1 on 2 August 1940
DD-74	Manley	Bath Iron Works	22 August 1916	23 August 1917	1 May 1930	19 November 1945	Scrapped 1946	Re-designated AG-28 on 28 November 1938; Re-designated APD-1 on 2 August 1940

== Bibliography ==
- Friedman, Norman (2004). US Destroyers: An Illustrated Design History (Revised ed.). Annapolis: Naval Institute Press. ISBN 1-55750-442-3.
- Gardiner, Robert, Conway's All the World's Fighting Ships 1906-1921, London: Conway Maritime Press, 1985. ISBN 0-85177-245-5.
- Gardiner, Robert and Chesneau, Roger, Conway's All the World's Fighting Ships 1922-1946, London: Conway Maritime Press, 1980. ISBN 0-83170-303-2.
- Jane's Fighting Ships of World War I. London: Random House Group, Ltd. 2001. p. 147. ISBN 1-85170-378-0.
- Campbell, John (1985). Naval Weapons of World War Two. Naval Institute Press. ISBN 0-87021-459-4.
- Fitzsimons, Bernard, General Editor. The Encyclopedia of 20th Century Weapons and Warfare, Volume 5, pp. 510–11, "Caldwell", and Volume 16, pp. 1717–18, "Leeds". London: Phoebus, 1978.
- Silverstone, Paul H., U.S. Warships of World War I (Ian Allan, 1970), ISBN 0-71100-095-6.
- Silverstone, Paul H., U.S. Warships of World War II (Ian Allan, 1965), ISBN 0-87021-773-9.
