= Destroyer Squadron 2 =

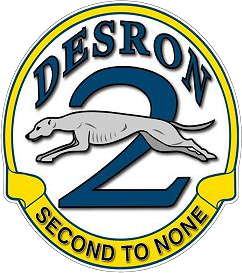
- Founded: 1919
- Country: United States
- Branch: United States Navy
- Type: Squadron
- Role: Naval air/surface warfare
- Part of: Carrier Strike Group 12
- Garrison/HQ: Naval Station Norfolk, Virginia
- Motto: Second to None

Destroyer Squadron 2 is a destroyer squadron of the United States Navy. It is administratively part of Commander, Naval Surface Force Atlantic. Destroyer Squadron 2 is assigned to Carrier Strike Group Twelve. As of 2023, the following destroyers are assigned to this squadron: USS Stout (DDG-55), USS McFaul (DDG-74), USS Oscar Austin (DDG-79), USS Bulkeley (DDG-84), USS Mason (DDG-87).

== Interwar period ==
Following the end of World War I, the U.S. Navy possessed an unprecedented number of destroyers, increased dramatically with the war emergency program ships of the Wickes and Clemson classes – known collectively as "flush-deckers" that differed from previous destroyer types that had been distinguished by raised forecastle decks. Destroyer Squadron Two first appeared in the U.S. Fleet organization in the spring of 1919, assigned to the Atlantic Fleet with the cruiser USS Columbia as its flagship. It comprised three destroyer flotillas, each composed of three six-ship divisions.

The U.S. Pacific Fleet organization of 1 August 1919 lists Destroyer Squadron Two as a reserve force, the squadron flag in the light cruiser USS Salem. It consisted of Flotilla Ten, comprising Division 29 (six ships), Division 30 (three ships), and Division 31 (six ships), and Flotilla Eleven, comprising six six-ship divisions (22, 23, 35, 32, 33 and 34), nine of the latter's ships apparently under construction, with names not yet assigned, in that they are listed only by number; some did not have commanding officers ordered to them.

The ships were in caretaker status, an arrangement that continued into the summer of 1920. By September 1920, when the term "squadron" came into its present usage, Squadron Two returned to the U.S. Atlantic Fleet's Destroyer Force as part of Flotilla Three, and comprised three divisions (27, 40, and 41) of reserve destroyers.

By New Year's Day 1921, Division 27 was assigned to operate in European waters, as were two ships from Division 40 (the rest remaining in reserve but with one ship—Overton- actually assigned to Division 27), and three from Division 41 (the rest in reserve). A month later, however (1 February 1921), the assignment table still carries Squadron Two under Flotilla Three, but with only one division of five ships assigned (and one of them—Bainbridge- still building) and based at Charleston, South Carolina. Only three of the ships in that division, however, which was carried as being in reserve had been in that unit the previous month.

The table of assignment of U.S. ships for 1 September 1922 carries only four active destroyer squadrons – Nine and Fourteen in the Atlantic Fleet and Eleven and Twelve in the Pacific—each squadron consisting of three six-ship divisions, with a flagship for each squadron. During 1922, DesRon 2's three divisions operated with 50-percent crews as a result of post-World War I budget reductions. Squadron Two in that [hypothetical] organization comprised Divisions Four, Five, and Six, each consisting of six ships, with a squadron leader. The unit was not homogenous, however, consisting of a mix of older destroyers such as Allen and the flush-deckers of the War Emergency Program.

The Table of Organization for the United States Fleet for 1 April 1931 reflected the reappearance of Destroyer Squadron Two as part of Destroyer Flotilla Two, Destroyers, Battle Force, as part of the organization mandated in General Order No. 211 of 10 December 1930. It also marks the appearance of four-ship, vice the six-ship, divisions that had existed through 1930.

Squadron Two, the flag in Litchfield, at that point consisted of three divisions of flush-deckers: Division Four, consisting of Dent, Rathburne, Talbot and Waters; Five: Dorsey, Elliot, Lea, and Roper; and Six: Aaron Ward, Buchanan, Crowninshield, and Hale. On 1 August 1932, Division Six's four ships were placed in Rotating Reserve Squadron 20, the Battle Force's first rotating reserve commission pool at Mare Island, Vallejo, California, replaced by Evans, Philip, Tracy and Wickes. By the following spring, the old Division Six that had been in rotating reserve became the new Division Four, while the rest of the squadron composition remained unchanged.

Borie became the new squadron flagship by 1 July 1933, relieved by the beginning of 1934 by Decatur while Squadron Two's three divisions went through Rotating Reserve Squadron 20 into the spring of 1935, with essentially sixteen ships rotating through the squadron during that time. Between 1933 and 1935, each of DesRon 2's divisions took a turn spending six months pierside with a caretaker crew. With fiscal constraints, the rotating reserve system permitted the Fleet to conserve scarce manpower while keeping its destroyers as prepared as possible.

By October 1935, DesRon 2 gained another four-ship division, Division 19. Ships of DesRon 2 participated in training exercises in 1936, with Decatur and Roper joining the Battle Fleet on the west coast to participate in Fleet Landing Exercise (FLEX) No. 3 – part of a series of such evolutions carried out to develop amphibious warfare tactics.

Destroyer Squadron Two was decommissioned at San Diego at the start of 1937 (with Roper and Decatur going to Squadron Ten), to be re-equipped with new Mahan-class destroyers. By that point, DesRon 2's new ships represented the pinnacle of American destroyer design.

Unlike previous destroyer organization, where the squadron flagship was a sister ship to those that made up the squadron, the new squadron flagship would be a different class of ship from those that made up the divisions. Under the reorganization of the fleet announced by Secretary of the Navy Claude A. Swanson on 26 May 1937, effective 14 June 1937, Squadron Two, under Destroyer Flotilla One, Destroyers, Scouting Force, U.S. Fleet, would consist of Division Three and Division Four, each consisting of four Mahan-class destroyers—DesDiv 3: Drayton, Mahan, Flusser, and Lamson; and DesDiv 4: Cushing, Preston, Smith, and Perkins, with Porter, leader of the new class of "destroyer leaders," serving as squadron flagship.

Soon thereafter, ships of the newly reconstituted Squadron Two participated in the intensive search for the famed aviator Amelia Earhart [Putnam], her navigator Frederick J. Noonan, and their twin-engine Lockheed 10-E Electra that had disappeared en route to Howland Island. On 4 July 1937, Lamson and Drayton from DesDiv 3 and Cushing from DesDiv 4 (severe vibrations in her port high-pressure turbine compelled Perkins to return to San Diego for a tender availability) joined the aircraft carrier Lexington, with Captain Jonathan S. Dowell, ComDesRon 2, assuming command of the search group. Despite six days of efforts, however, often hindered by heavy squalls, 143,242 miles flown by the carrier's scout planes, and 151,556 square miles searched, the group turned up nothing. As Captain Dowell summarized the search: "No sign nor any evidence of the Earhart plane was discovered."

As the Fleet expanded as the world drifted toward war, inevitable changes occurred in fleet organization and employment while training proceeded during 1938 and 1939. At the start of 1940, Squadron Two still consisted of the flagship Porter and two divisions of four Mahan-class ships that had equipped the squadron since it had been reconstituted in early 1937. When President Franklin D. Roosevelt retained the U.S. Fleet at Pearl Harbor, Hawaii, in the spring of 1940, following the conclusion of Fleet Problem XXI, Squadron Two's destroyers began operations from that base. Troubled world conditions led to a cancellation of the Fleet Problem (XXII) scheduled for 1941.

Squadron composition again became homogenous during 1941 with nine Sims-class destroyers: Morris (flagship), Sims, Hughes, Anderson, and Hammann formed DesDiv 3, while Mustin, Russell, O'Brien and Walke formed DesDiv 4. Originally operating in the Pacific, the Sims-class ships that comprised Squadron Two were transferred to the Atlantic (the movements highly secret, with the ships' prominent black-shadowed white hull numbers, as well as the names in black letters at their sterns being painted out) beginning in the spring of 1941, basing upon Argentia, Newfoundland; Iceland; Narragansett Bay; Casco Bay, Maine; and Boston, Massachusetts. Initially, Squadron Two was assigned to Task Force 4 (1 April 1941), then to Task Force 1 (1 July 1941). That autumn, Squadron Two's ships escorted convoys in the North Atlantic, depth-charging suspected German U-boat contacts.

== Second World War ==
Soon after war engulfed the U.S. Pacific Fleet at Pearl Harbor, however, Squadron Two's ships returned to the Pacific in December 1941 with the first carrier deployed to the Pacific, USS Yorktown, and operated with "The Mighty Y" in the Early Pacific Raids (February–March 1942), the Battle of the Coral Sea (4–8 May 1942) (where Sims was lost), and the Battle of Midway (4–6 June 1942) (where Hammann was lost while screening salvage operations of Yorktown). O'Brien succumbed to torpedo damage in the wake of the torpedoing of USS Wasp in September, while Walke was lost in November at the Naval Battle of Guadalcanal.

The first year of combat in the Pacific had thinned Squadron Two down to five ships – Morris, Anderson, Hughes, Mustin and Russell. Since before World War II, the first two ships of the ten-ship Benham class had operated in the Pacific, attached to DesRon 6. Of those, USS Benham was lost in the same action as Walke. USS Ellet after a west coast overhaul in late 1943, joined DesRon 2 on her return to the war zone, bringing its strength back to six ships. Meanwhile, DesDiv 15—Benham-class destroyers USS Lang, USS Stack, USS Sterett and USS Wilson—had operated in the Atlantic and Mediterranean with Wasp and, in June 1942, escorted her to the Pacific. Wilson fought at the Battle of Savo Island in August 1942 and Sterett participated in the Battle of Guadalcanal in November, where she earned a Presidential Unit Citation. In the summer of 1943, while DesRon 2 was dispersed with Hughes, Mustin and Morris operating in the Aleutian Islands, DesDiv 15—less Wilson—under Commodore Rodger W. Simpson, formed Support Division A-2 in Commodore Frederick Moosbrugger's victory at the Battle of Vella Gulf. Ellet, Lang, Stack, Sterett and Wilson joined DesRon 2 later in the war.

In 1944, the five Sims-class veterans were combined into DesDiv 3 of DesRon 2 while the veteran DesDiv 15 was reassigned as DesDiv 4. In 1943 and 1944 respectively, USS Roe and USS Wainwright were also transferred to the squadron from the Mediterranean where they, like USS Buck (the 12th and last ship of the Sims class, lost in the Mediterranean), had served as squadron flagships. Although assigned to DesRon 2 in 1945, those two ships never operated with it as a unit.

Beginning in late 1943, DesRon 2 participated in the Gilbert and Marshall Islands campaign, where Anderson was hit by shore battery fire. Invasions of the Marianas, western New Guinea, Palau and the Philippines followed. In 1945, the Okinawa campaign saw Anderson, Hughes, Morris, Sterett and Wilson suffering kamikaze damage, with the squadron's historical files being lost in flagship Morris when she was hit by a kamikaze. The combined record of the ships of DesRon 2 included 145 battle stars (some earned while attached to other units) including ten or more stars for all ships that survived the war. More than 450 of the squadron's men had died, however, and 175 had been wounded.

Scrapping disposed of Lang, Sterett, Russell, Morris and Roe while Stack, Wilson, Hughes, Anderson, Mustin and Wainwright served as targets during Operation Crossroads, the Bikini atomic tests. There, while Anderson was sunk in Test Able on 1 July 1946, Stack, Wilson, Mustin, Hughes and Wainwright survived both Tests Able and Baker. Scientists monitored the contaminated ships until 1948, when they were scuttled by gunfire—Stack, Wilson, Mustin and Wainwright off Kwajalein in April and July, and Hughes, the last surviving member of the squadron, near California's Farallon Islands in October.

== Immediate postwar period ==
The post-World War II period was analogous to the post-World War I time, when the U.S. Navy's destroyer forces consisted of large numbers of wartime construction-program ships, at a time of demobilization. The Wickes and Clemson classes were to the 1917–1920 destroyer force what the Allen M. Sumner and Gearing classes were to the destroyer force of 1944–1946.

In January 1946, DesRon 66 included USS Putnam (flagship), USS Strong, USS Hugh W. Hadley, USS Willard Keith, USS James C. Owens, in Division 131; and the USS Zellars, USS Massey, USS Douglas H. Fox and USS Stormes, in Division 132. DesRon 66 was then redesignated as DesRon 2, composed of DesDivs 21 and 22, and ordered to the Atlantic, where it came under Destroyers, Second Fleet.

DesRon 2's complement of 2,200-tonners remained constant through the summer of 1946, when USS Henley was reassigned from the Pacific Fleet, replacing Strong in DesDiv 21. DesRon 2 conducted a cold weather cruise toward the end of that year (29 October-9 November 1946), departing NS Argentia and steaming up the east coast of Newfoundland and Labrador, and then returning by way of the Strait of Belle Isle, the Gulf of St. Lawrence, and Cabot Strait. The ships encountered two severe storms, however, one with winds gusting up to 50 knots for 36 hours, the second with wind velocities of 56 knots that caused 60 degree rolls. Flagship Putnam incurred damage to the gunshield of Mt. 51.

The ships assigned to DesRon 2 remained constant through the autumn of 1949, after which DesDiv 21 does not appear in the Atlantic Fleet Destroyer Force, while DesDiv 22 remained intact at the start of 1950. Soon thereafter, however, DesRon 2 received a new group of ships, 2,425 tonners: six of the nine being classified as "destroyer escorts" (DDE). The new DesDiv 21 consisted of USS Fred T. Berry, USS Keppler, USS Norris, USS McCaffery and USS Harwood; DesDiv 22 consisted of USS Warrington, USS William M. Wood, USS William C. Lawe and USS Leland E. Thomas. By 1 October 1950, Harwood was reassigned to DesDiv 22.

Early in 1951, however, the composition of DesRon 2 changed again (to 2,200 tonners) with DesDiv 21 becoming a six-ship division that included four destroyers and two radar picket destroyers (DDR) by 1 February: USS Barton, USS Soley, USS John R. Pierce, Strong (back for a second tour in DesRon 2) USS Charles P. Cecil, and USS Furse. DesDiv 22 was composed of USS Allen M. Sumner, USS Moale, USS Ingraham and USS Robert K. Huntington. Further changes, however, occurred in the summer of 1951. While DesDiv 21 remained largely unchanged, DesDiv 22 was reconstituted with USS English, USS Hank, USS Wallace L. Lind and USS Borie (the last-named ship carrying on the distinguished tradition of a former DesRon 2 flagship from the 1930s)

== Korean War ==
With the onset of hostilities in Korea in 1950, Atlantic Fleet destroyers were deployed to the Far East to augment the Pacific Fleet's destroyer forces. DesRon 2's DesDiv 22 served between October 1950 and May 1951; DesDiv 21 between June and September 1952; only USS Charles P. Cecil did not deploy to the war zone, being temporarily assigned to DesDiv 22 from 21 when it deployed to Korea. DesRon 2's ships served with distinction both as a part of Task Forces (TF) 77 and 95, supporting shore bombardment, search and rescue, anti-submarine screening (Hunter/Killer Groups), picket duty, and air-control missions. Its ships also provided anti-submarine screening for the carriers of TF 77 conducting raids against North Korean hydroelectric power stations on the Yalu River. Aircraft from the carriers USS Boxer, USS Bon Homme Richard, USS Princeton, and USS Philippine Sea took part in these massive raids in concert with U.S. Air Force planes. At the end of August 1952, Barton joined DesDiv 21 in a hunter-killer antisubmarine training exercise off the east coast of Japan before rejoining TF 77 on 15 September. The tour proved brief, however, for, on the evening of the 16th, the destroyer struck a floating mine, the explosion tearing a 15-foot by 25-foot hole in the starboard side, completely flooding the forward fireroom and killing five men and wounding seven of those on watch there. Fast and effective action by the repair parties kept Barton afloat and enabled her to reach Sasebo on 20 September where she made temporary repairs. Charles P. Cecil, meanwhile, was returned to DesDiv 21 in the spring of 1953, but by the summer had been reassigned out of DesRon 2 entirely.

DesRon 2's composition remained unchanged during 1954, with DesDiv 21 – Barton (flag), Soley, and Strong, joined by the radar picket destroyer USS Stickell, visiting Durban, Natal, Union of South Africa (3–8 July), then Cape Town (10–12 July) before heading for South America, after a deployment with the 7th Fleet. The same four ships visited Rio de Janeiro, Brazil (22–25 July), then Recife (28–29 July) after which they proceeded to Port of Spain, Trinidad.

Training exercises and Atlantic Fleet maneuvers out of Norfolk, generally operating in the Virginia capes area and the West Indies, followed as the composition of DesRon 2 remained constant during 1955 and into 1956. Hunter-killer antisubmarine warfare (ASW) training prepared the ships to return to the Mediterranean. The ships participated in a North Atlantic Treaty Organization (NATO) Exercise Whipsaw, after which Barton and Soley steamed to Port Said, Egypt, to transit the Suez Canal and proceed into the Persian Gulf for a routine six-week patrol with the Middle East Force. On 29 October 1956, Barton and Soley started south from the vicinity of Abadan, Iran, to leave the gulf, circumnavigate the Arabian Peninsula, and retransit the Suez Canal. Hostilities broke out that same day between Israel and Egypt, however, over Egypt's nationalization of the canal - the Suez Crisis. The war closed the waterway, and subsequent international military action prompted Egypt to block it with sunken ships. Meanwhile, Barton and Soley anchored in Sitrah Harbor, Bahrain, and stood by in case a need arose to evacuate Americans from the region. Operating from Bahrain, Barton spent the next two months anchored at night and conducting tactical and gunnery drills by day. Finally, on 12 December, the destroyer received orders directing her around the Cape of Good Hope to Norfolk, where she tied up on 5 February 1957.

DesRon 2 continued to operate with the same ships into 1958. Following a period of upkeep, Barton prepared to put to sea on 14 March, and soon thereafter she, along with USS William M. Wood received orders to escort the guided missile heavy cruiser USS Canberra as she carried President Dwight D. Eisenhower to Bermuda to confer with British Prime Minister Harold Macmillan. Barton carried members of the press to the ceremony and stood guard with William M. Wood at the entrance to the harbor. The destroyer then conducted ASW patrol and spent time in Norfolk in upkeep before going into drydock in Newport News for hull repairs. Barton exited Chesapeake Bay on 1 July and set out for yet another Mediterranean cruise. After several weeks of training operations with NATO forces and other units of the 6th Fleet, Barton anchored in Port Said on the night of 20 September. The following day, she and Soley transited the Suez Canal together once again and then headed to the Persian Gulf for a month of operations with the Iranian Navy.

In November 1958, Barton (DesRon 2 flagship), along with Soley and John R. Pierce, visited the Mediterranean, mooring briefly at Gibraltar as well as at Taranto, Italy, where, while entering port, the oiler USS Nantahala, accompanying DesRon 2 and the attack carrier USS Randolph, rescued an Italian fisherman from his boat suffering from a cerebral hemorrhage. La Gazzetta del Mezzogiorno, Bari's provincial newspaper, published a laudatory article concerning the rescue. As the new year 1959 began, DesRon 2 was still operating under the operational control of Commander, 6th Fleet, with John R. Pierce and Soley having worked round-the-clock through Christmas of 1958 and New Year's Day of 1959, endeavoring to prevent the sinking of the Panamanian-flag tanker Mirador following an onboard explosion and fire at Iskenderun Bay, Turkey; DC2 John L. King, from Soley's damage control party, perished in the battle with the flames, but the destroyermen managed to quell the fires. A second outbreak of fire on board Mirador in mid-January, however, caused another explosion that eventually claimed the ship, and in the process set afire the Turkish salvage vessel Imroz, that Soley saved when her firefighters made quick work of the flames. In February 1959, after a strong storm with 70 miles-per-hour winds suddenly arose off the Arabian coast, sinking several small fishing craft, Strong sped to the scene and searched those waters for over 24 hours, eventually rescuing 13 local fishermen.

With all eight ships in the squadron in one place for the first time since the 1958–1959 Mediterranean deployment began, DesRon 2 gathered at Gibraltar on 28 March 1959 to begin the homeward voyage. Returning to the United States on 8 April 1959, the squadron lost Strong to DesRon 32, and received no replacement, making DesRon 2 a seven-ship squadron. From that point through June, DesRon 2's ships underwent needed maintenance, with an interim yard availability assigned concurrently with a tender availability. Soon thereafter, ships from DesRon 2 were assigned to the operational control of Commander Antisubmarine Defense Force, U.S. Atlantic Fleet, which conducted Hunter-Killer (HUK) operations with the antisubmarine warfare support carrier USS Tarawa. In those exercises, DesRon 2 destroyers acted as the coordinating unit of a team that included fixed-wing aircraft and helicopters, to test new attack and screening methods against conventional and nuclear-powered submarines.

After spending 1960 operating with Task Group ALFA, DesRon 2 undertook training both at Guantanamo Bay, Cuba, and Norfolk, Virginia, where ships also underwent overhaul in 1961, and operated in support of Project Mercury space shot operations. In addition, Soley proceeded to the waters off the Dominican Republic, in readiness to evacuate Americans if unrest should arise in the wake of the assassination of Rafael Trujillo, as did Borie and Wallace L. Lind. On 9 September 1961, the Norfolk, Va., based Barton, Soley, John R. Pierce, English, and Hank proceeded to the Mediterranean to operate with the Sixth Fleet, leaving Borie and Wallace L. Lind in Norfolk, where they began Fleet Rehabilitation and Modernization (FRAM) II conversions on 21 November and 22 December, respectively. The Mediterranean deployment involved fleet exercises as well as visits to liberty ports including Suda Bay, Crete; Piraeus, Greece; Naples and Genoa, Italy, and Monte Carlo, Monaco. Following her refresher training at Guantanamo Bay, the Fletcher-class USS Wren, assigned to the squadron on 1 October 1961, joined the squadron for its Mediterranean deployment in January 1962, and returned to Norfolk with the squadron on 31 March 1962; she would remain assigned to DesRon 2 until 9 July, when she sailed to enter the Reserve Fleet at Galveston, Texas. Remaining briefly in port, the squadron – minus Borie and Wallace L. Lind – took part in an amphibious demonstration for President John F. Kennedy at Onslow Beach, North Carolina. Resuming Mercury shot recovery operations, John R. Pierce recovered the Aurora 7 capsule after a helicopter from USS Intrepid had retrieved astronaut Lt. Comdr. M. Scott Carpenter, on 24 May 1962 off Puerto Rico.

== Cuban Missile Crisis to 1990s ==
With the onset of the Cuban Missile Crisis in the autumn of 1962, DesRon 2, commanded by Capt. George R. Reinhart, departed Norfolk for the Caribbean along with much of the Atlantic Fleet. There, the squadron performed myriad tasks that included support for carrier operations, ASW support for Service Forces, Atlantic and Amphibious Forces, Atlantic units, escort duty for ships evacuating Americans from Guantanamo Bay, and filling the quarantine line. John R. Pierce, along with sistership USS Joseph P. Kennedy, Jr., boarded and inspected the Lebanese-flagged freighter Marucla, contracted by the Soviet Union to carry cargo to Cuba, the first vessel boarded after imposition of the quarantine, on 26 October 1962. When the crisis abated, English and Hank returned to Norfolk on 27 November and the rest of DesRon 2 during the first week of December.

From 1963 to 1966, DesRon 2 carried out Operation Springboard training as part of Anti-Submarine Warfare Forces, Atlantic Fleet. DesRon 2 also deployed to the Mediterranean during these years. Organizationally, USS Richard E. Kraus joined DesDiv 21, Borie was reassigned to DesDiv 21, while USS John R. Pierce was reassigned to DesDiv 22 on 1 January 1963. Soon thereafter, in March 1963, Barton, John R. Pierce, Soley, English, and Hank operated under the Commander Mid East Force while serving in the Red and Arabian Seas as well and the Indian Ocean. In April, Wallace L. Lind participated in the unsuccessful search for the submarine USS Thresher, then on 13 June broke the flag of Admiral Harold Page Smith, Commander in Chief, Atlantic Fleet, as he observed the firing of a Polaris missile from the fleet ballistic missile submarine USS Lafayette. At the end of a Mediterranean deployment in August 1963, Barton and Borie made a goodwill tour of the Baltic Sea to support Vice President Lyndon B. Johnson's Scandinavian tour. The destroyers held "open ship" for general visiting at Copenhagen, Denmark, and Helsinki, Finland, before heading home on 10 September, proceeding via the Kiel Canal, Portsmouth, England, and the Azores. Meanwhile, Furse joined the squadron upon completion of her FRAM I conversion (15 September); Hank and English were transferred to the Reserve Fleet on 1 October; and Richard E. Kraus, upon completion of her FRAM I conversion that had begun on 30 June at Boston, rejoined on 15 October.

During 1964, USS Blandy, USS Steinaker, USS Murray and USS Robert A. Owens were assigned to DesRon 2, enlarging its complement to ten ships, each division composed of five ships: DesDiv 21 with Blandy, Borie, Barton, USS Rich and Steinaker; DesDiv 22 with Furse, Murray, Wallace L. Lind, John R. Pierce and Robert A. Owens.

On 26 May 1965, the squadron sailed to participate in the Project Gemini GT-4 Recovery Mission, after which it stopped in Lisbon, Portugal. Aside from cruises, the squadron continued training operations, including exercise Straight Laced, a NATO ASW/Strike exercise.

Most of DesRon 2's resources were devoted to training ships in anti-submarine warfare in 1967. During the January Mediterranean transit, Steinaker surfaced a Soviet Foxtrot-class submarine. With six of nine squadron ships deployed to the Mediterranean, ComDesRon 2 functioned as a part of the Gold Group of Task Force 60, the fast carrier attack force of the Sixth Fleet. The squadron engaged in training with four other navies, but led the second annual Spanish-American bilateral exercise, dubbed SpanEx 1–67. Returning home afforded opportunities to conduct low flyer recognition and satellite reconnaissance training.

The next year, 1968, saw DesRon 2's temporary transfer to the Western Pacific (WestPac), when the squadron – Blandy, Rich, Borie and Steinaker — was ordered to Vietnam to operate with the Seventh Fleet. Its first division arrived at Subic Bay, Republic of the Philippines, on 6 May and the second division on 20 May. On 11 May, Blandy with Capt. Frank C. Dunham embarked, cleared Subic Bay, and arrived off the I Corps area, Vietnam. There Capt. Dunham assumed command of all naval gunfire support operations by allied forces for the entire coast of South Vietnam. In addition, ships of DesRon 2 took part in Operation Sea Dragon, providing suppression fire against North Vietnamese coastal defense gun sites. DesRon 2 concluded combat responsibilities associated with its WestPac deployment on October 1. After leaving Subic Bay, the integrity of each of DesRon 2's divisions was disrupted, and the squadron failed to reunite until its return to Norfolk in November. While in Vietnam, DesRon 2 tallied over 350 killed of the enemy, over 2,300 military structures damaged or destroyed, and over sixty major caliber enemy weapons silenced. Rich exemplified the other aspect of the work of the ships of DesRon 2, when she steamed to Yankee Station, where, from 13 May to 20 July 1968 she provided escort and plane guard services for four successive attack aircraft carriers: USS Bon Homme Richard, USS Enterprise, USS Constellation, and USS Ticonderoga in Tonkin Gulf.

The squadron was restructured in July 1969 as part of a reordering within the Cruiser-Destroyer Force. All ships, except Robert A. Owens were transferred from DesRon 2 to other squadrons, and the new squadron's DesDiv 21 comprised guided missile frigate USS Dahlgren, USS John W. Weeks, USS Mullinnix and USS Richard P. Leary that spent the rest of the year in Norfolk for leave, upkeep, and availabilities. The following year, 1970, DesRon 2 participated in extensive training, first, in the Caribbean for RIMEX IV-70, and later in the Mediterranean where, as part of TF 60, it conducted Exercise National Week in the Ionian Sea. While in the Mediterranean, the squadron distinguished itself in responding to the Fedayeen hijacking of four airliners to Jordan that endangered American citizens in Jordan, receiving the Meritorious Unit Commendation. After ComDesRon 2 planned with the ComPhibLant and Hellenic Destroyer Squadron staffs for the NATO Exercise Deep Express/Deep South, the squadron returned to Norfolk on 17 November. It passed most of 1971 training either in Norfolk or in the Caribbean, the latter engaged in Springboard operations, before embarking on another Mediterranean deployment on 1 December.[Unit stations must have varied during this time. USS Mullinnix was deployed to WESTPAC in Apr 71 through Oct 71. Various sources exist, including Mullinnix Cruise Book.]

Under the flagship, guided missile cruiser USS Harry E. Yarnell, DesRon 2 began 1972 by sailing from Valencia, Spain, to intercept, follow, and gather intelligence on Soviet warships in the Western Mediterranean as part of Bystander Operations. The squadron participated in National Week Operations in February, and when a special operation was cancelled, moored at Athens for Administrative and Material Inspection. After visiting Italy and Monte Carlo, the squadron returned to Norfolk on 29 June 1972, and commenced a standdown.

In 1973, Richard E. Byrd resumed Springboard operations in the Puerto Rico operating areas before sailing for extended operations with the Sixth Fleet to the Mediterranean, where she remained until 1 December due to Yom Kippur War tensions. Other ships engaged in training exercises or remained at Norfolk. The squadron's actions through 1973 were of a similar variety, including Atlantic Fleet Readiness exercises in the Puerto Rico operating area as well as a deployment to the Mediterranean in November for duty with the Sixth Fleet. In November, ComDesRon 2 participated in Operation Quick Draw with Italian Navy units, and the next month, took part in National Week XVI, before spending the holidays in Barcelona, Spain and returning to Norfolk on 15 May 1975. The squadron passed the summer of 1975 in Norfolk, before it conducted SXTEX 2–76 and COMPTUEX 2–76 exercises in September in Norfolk and off the Virginia capes, and following a successful MISSILEX operation, remained in Norfolk until the end of the year.

As it entered 1976, ComDesRon 2 embarked in McCandless, shifted his pennant to Mitscher, and assisted with the major NATO exercise, Safe Pass'76 (6–24 March). In May, DesRon 2 participated in the Joint U.S. exercise, Solid Shield, and in July, proceeded to Rota, Spain for duty with Commander Carrier Group 2 and Commander Sixth Fleet. While deployed, DesRon 2 took part in ASW Week exercises as well as National Week XXI (23 August-24 September). Participating in further ASW exercises and visiting ports in Italy, France, and Spain, it remained in the Mediterranean for the remainder of the year, and, on 30 December, set out to conduct surveillance operations in the Gulf of Sollum off the United Arab Republic and Libyan littorals. After completion of that work and brief port visits in Spain, DesRon 2 returned to Norfolk for upkeep, but returned to Europe in June for a month-long tour, labeled Exercise Silver Jubilee, the multinational exercise coinciding with celebrations for Queen Elizabeth's 25-year reign.

In April 1978, DesRon 2 became one of six non-deploying readiness squadrons. At the start of the year, DesRon 2 consisted of six guided missile destroyers, three frigates, three Spruance-class destroyers and USS Dupont. A reorganization of the Atlantic Fleet Destroyer squadrons on 4 April gave DesRon 2 an administrative disparate complement of 16 ships, a number lessened by one with the decommissioning of USS Mitscher on 1 June. By year's end, the squadron included: guided missile destroyers USS John King, USS Lawrence, USS Claude V. Ricketts, USS Barney, USS Conyngham, USS Richard E. Byrd, USS Farragut, USS Coontz, USS King, USS Dahlgren, the frigates USS McCloy and USS Glover, destroyers Dupont and Blandy and guided missile frigate USS Richard L. Page. ComDesRon 2 provided support for the ships under his administrative control as immediate unit commander, and served as chief inspector for nuclear weapons acceptance inspections, Navy technical proficiency inspections, embarked in various ships to observe operational propulsion plant inspections, visited assigned ships undergoing overhauls in remote locations to monitor progress of the work, and carried out at-sea operational readiness inspections of various units.

In June 1982, ComDesRon 2 Anti-Air Warfare Tactics Board was established to serve as a forum for tactical dialogue. The following year the squadron introduced the Personnel Training Initiatives Program in order to provide its ships with additional means for training key people. Focusing on three areas, these training initiatives sent undesignated seamen and firemen to Class "A" schools on returnable quotas, transferred Second Class Petty Officers and those of higher rank for temporary additional duty with Fleet Training Group at Guantanamo Bay for four to six weeks, and cross-decked E-5's and above to ships undergoing refresher training. The training program met with encouraging results.

Continuing its training efforts over the next three years, ComDesRon 2 served as Chief Inspector for Nuclear Weapons Acceptance Inspections, Navy Technical Proficiency Inspections, Type Commander 3M and Supply Management Inspections, and increased the number of Command Inspections it conducted overall. ComDesRon 2 retained its role as CINTEX Coordinator for the Norfolk waterfront. In order to enhance training, new initiatives were implemented, including the integration of MUTTS (Multi-Units Tactical Training System), ULQ-13 Countermeasures Signal Stimulator Vans, and U.S. Air Force AWACS assets into formal CINTEX Training scenarios.

The next year, NTISA DET, FLETCCORGRU 2, and NAVSECGRU were included. Furthermore, efforts to integrate inter-service participation within CINTEX were introduced. These included participation by the AWACS assets and Coast Guard ships, as well as foreign warship participation during Norfolk port visits. And for her work in 1984, Preble earned the Arleigh Burke Award Trophy for displaying the greatest improvement in Battle Efficiency within the Atlantic Fleet. The CMS QuickLooks program, which provided for one-day notice CMS quicklooks on board squadron units was continued, and, on 10 December 1986, CinCLantFlt Inspector General's office conducted a surprise command security inspection of CDS-2 Staff and attached ships, of which ComDesRon 2 had the best seen security program to date.

In 1989, ComDesRon 2 was assigned as OTC for Type Commander's Core Training Exercise, and was home-ported in Charleston, South Carolina. In September, the squadron's training in the Puerto Rican Operating area ended abruptly as Hurricane Hugo thrashed St. Thomas, St. John, and Puerto Rico. ComDesRon 2 assumed on scene commander for relief efforts, for which the squadron was awarded the Humanitarian Service Medal in February 1991. The unit also assumed waterfront in-port training responsibilities for all Cruiser-Destroyer Group 8 units. CINTEX exercises also occurred with an emphasis on Basic Command and Control.

Over the next two years, DesRon 2 provided material, administrative, and operational support to the ships under its direct administrative control including units temporarily assigned from Cruiser-Destroyer Group 8. As a training agent for Commander, Cruiser-Destroyer Group 8, ComDesRon 2 conducted weekly waterfront in-port training in Radio/Combat Information Center and Visual Communication. In addition, specific ASW, convoy, amphibious warfare, and Anti-Surface Warfare exercises occupied the unit's time. Besides participating in these and other training exercises, ComDesRon 2 acted as Regional Training Conference Board Chairman for team trainers managed by ComTraLant.

== Post Cold War ==
DesRon 2 experienced dramatic changes in 1992. As a result of the Navy's reorganization and downsizing plans, Destroyer Squadron 10 was decommissioned on 1 September, and DesRon 2 absorbed its Spruance and Kidd-class destroyers and Arleigh Burke-class guided missile destroyers, raising the number of classes maintained and trained by DesRon 2 to five. As part of that realignment, ComDesRon 2 also assumed the title of Commander, Naval Surface Group Norfolk (ComNavSurfGru). With that added responsibility, DesRon 2 provided the oversight for the manning, material, and readiness for all cruisers and destroyers home-ported in Norfolk. As training agent for ships based there, ComDesRon 2 led bi-weekly waterfront in-port training in both Radio/Combat Information Center and Visual Communications, coordinated mutual training exercises between surface and subsurface units with bi-weekly mutual training meetings, and served as Training Conference Board Chairman for team trainers managed by ComTraLant.

Throughout 1993 and 1994, with the arrival of three new Arleigh Burke-class destroyers, DesRon 2 expanded to include 18 ships. In the Commander Naval Surface Group capacity, the command swelled to a total of 32 ships as a result of the commissioning of new ships as well as homeport shifts in accordance with the Base Realignment and Closure decisions. In addition to its 1994 routine deployments to the Mediterranean, Caribbean, and North Atlantic, the squadron assisted in Haiti as a part of Operation Support Democracy and conducted Cuban migrant rescues during Operation Able Vigil. Other missions that year included a deployment to the Adriatic where the unit conducted both surface and air surveillance against the former republic of Yugoslavia in compliance with United Nations Sanctions, Maritime Interdiction Operations to enforce United Nations Sanctions against Iraq in the Northern Red Sea and Persian Gulf, and UNITAS XXXV with South American allies.

In June 1995, as part of the Navy's new "Forward…from the Sea" missions, the Atlantic Fleet's surface combatant ships were reorganized into six core battle groups, nine destroyer squadrons and a new Western Hemisphere Group. The squadrons were assigned to the battle groups on a rotational basis, depending on where they are in their maintenance and deployment cycles. DesRon 2, formerly a non-deploying readiness squadron, was disestablished, and converted to a Sea Duty command with a new staff and four permanently assigned ships: USS Arleigh Burke, destroyers USS Stump and USS Deyo, and the guided missile frigate USS Kauffman. Those restructurings raised the squadron's ship tally to 29 and caused NavSurfGru Norfolk's ranks to number 43 ships.

DesRon 2 began its 1996 training in May, when the squadron cruised to the Puerto Rican Operations area for INDEX 96-2 and Naval Gunfire Support qualification. After successful training exercises, USS John L. Hall deployed in July for a two-and-a-half month UNITAS 37–96 missions, in which an American task group circumnavigates South America while conducting joint exercises with host-nation navies along the route. Following its UNITAS deployment, DesRon 2 spent the rest of 1996 at Norfolk.

While preparing to deploy to the Mediterranean, Commodore, Capt. Jimmie R. Jackson was relieved by Capt. Samuel J. Locklear III. At that time, the squadron's focus shifted from administrative oversight of four ships to tactical operations and preparations for the Mediterranean deployment. Assigned the role of Sea Combat Commander (SCC) for the Dwight D. Eisenhower Battle Group at the Warfare Commanders Conference, DesRon 2's responsibilities included Undersea Warfare, Surface Warfare, Maritime Interception Operations, and Screen Commander. In December, USS Mitscher joined DesRon 2, while the following year, 1998, saw the loss of Kauffman and the gain of USS McFaul and USS Carr. Capping a successful year of preparation for deployment, Kauffman won the Battle "E" award. In June 1998, DesRon 2 departed Norfolk, ComDesRon 2 embarked in Dwight D. Eisenhower as the Sea Combat Commander as part of the Dwight D. Eisenhower Battle Group, and participated in seven bi-lateral and multi-lateral exercises, as well as supporting NATO in enforcing NATO Security Council Resolutions during the Kosovo crisis.

DesRon 2 – with guided missile destroyers Arleigh Burke, Mitscher, and Porter, destroyers Stump and Deyo, and guided missile frigate Carr permanently assigned – began the year 2000 at Norfolk, then participated in a group sail with the Harry S. Truman Battle Group, ComDesRon 2 in Porter (31 January-10 February). DesRon 2 participated in a second group sail in the spring (3–17 May), with the squadron commander on board Stump, after which time the squadron carried out training off the Virginia capes (19–24 June), with ComDesRon 2 again in Stump. Further training followed, including exercise Unified Spirit with Harry S. Truman (11–26 October), as the squadron prepared to deploy to the Mediterranean. That scheduled movement as part of the Harry S. Truman Battle Group began on 28 November, ComDesRon 2 in Porter. DesRon 2 visited Málaga, Spain, beginning on 11 December, then conducted exercises at sea (18 December), and began a port visit to Barcelona three days before Christmas of 2000. Following a port visit to Dubrovnik, Croatia (5–9 January 2001), ComDesRon 2 in Porter, serving as Commander Task Force 60 with the departure of Harry S. Truman deploying to the Persian Gulf, got underway for the eastern Mediterranean to conduct Reliant Mermaid, after which the ships paused briefly at Souda Bay, Crete (2–5 February). Proceeding thence to Haifa, Israel, for exercise Juniper Cobra I, ComDesRon 2 logged a succession of Mediterranean locations: Souda Bay, Crete; Capo Teulada, Sardinia; and Split, Croatia; Naples, Palma, and Gaeta, and La Maddalena, Italy; Toulon, France; Aksaz, Turkey; before replenishing at Souda Bay (18 April). Punctuating the remainder of the deployment with exercises Babylon Express (19 April) and SHAREM 137 (21 April), and visits to Antalya, Turkey and a return call to Gaeta, and Málaga, ComDesRon 2 embarked in Stump for the return crossing on 11 May, and reached Norfolk on the 24th, concluding the deployment of the Harry S. Truman Battle Group

DesRon 2 began the year 2002 with five permanently assigned ships, Arleigh Burke, Porter, Stump, USS Winston S. Churchill (that had been assigned to DesRon 2 on 1 December 2001), and Carr, with ComDesRon 2 inport at Norfolk. ComDesRon 2 embarked in Porter on 15 January in preparation for a joint tactical forces exercise with the John F. Kennedy Battle Group, and the latter sailed on 18 January to conduct those evolutions, returning to port on 26 January, with ComDesRon 2 serving as Opposition Force, Officer Controlling Exercise during that evolution.

During the summer of 2002, Porter and Stump, as well as guided missile frigate USS Boone, destroyer USS Nicholson and guided missile destroyer USS Cole, participated in Midshipmen Core Training '02, providing instruction to 130 NROTC midshipmen (17–21 June). Two major antisubmarine warfare exercises followed during the summer. The first was Smart Search '02 (12–19 July) during which a ready destroyer squadron deployed on short notice in the event of the proximity of a forward-deployed submarine, using Arleigh Burke, Carr, and Porter, in addition to organic LAMPS helicopters and other assets. The second was Keflavik Tactical Exercise '02/SHAREM 143 that took place between 26 August and 23 September. A number of group sails brought the training cycle for the year to a close for several of the ships attached to DesRon 2. On 14 December, ComDesRon 2 embarked in the carrier USS Theodore Roosevelt.

In January 2003, ComDesRon 2 departed Norfolk in Theodore Roosevelt and surge-deployed in support of Operation Iraqi Freedom. During that period, ComDesRon 2 served as the SCC for the Theodore Roosevelt Carrier Strike Group operating in the Eastern Mediterranean as part of Task Force 60. As the SCC, ComDesRon 2 was responsible for numerous mission areas, including surface warfare, force defense, LAMPS element coordinator and Maritime Interception Operations (MIO) commander. The strike group's ships and aircraft conducted tactical air and TLAM strikes into Iraqi during combat operations from the Eastern Mediterranean. As MIO commander, ComDesRon 2 planned and executed a number of critical boardings of suspect vessels. Further, during Operation Iraqi Freedom the SCC managed the daily scheme of maneuver of all CTF 60 forces, including two aircraft carriers and up to 14 surface combatants. Despite deploying four months earlier than scheduled, the ships and staff of DesRon 2 successfully executed a number of critical missions in support of combat operations.

In 2004, DesRon 2 was assigned to Commander Carrier Strike Group 12. Cole and McFaul shifted squadrons and Stump was decommissioned. During October and November, DesRon 2 participated in a major multi-national exercise, United Kingdom Joint Conference (JMC 04–3). Working with the Royal Navy's Commander Amphibious Task Group Staff, commanded by Commodore C.J. Parry, RN, ComDesRon 2 embarked in HMS Albion, Arleigh Burke, Winston S. Churchill, and Porter participated in that exercise that stressed naval and marine coalition coordination in a littoral environment.

ComDesRon 2 commenced 2005 with all ships in the Unit Level Training Phase and Intermediate Training Phase. In May, ComDesRon 2 embarked in Porter for Submarine Commander's Course (SCC) Operation 05–2 with Arleigh Burke, Carr, and HMCS Ville de Quebec. Effective August 25, 2005, ISIC/TACON functions of guided missile frigate USS Nicholas were transferred to ComDesRon 2 and ComCarStrikeGru 12.

During the winter months of 2004 and into the New Year 2005 ComDesRon 2 focused on the upcoming deployment as Sea Combat Commander for the Enterprise Strike Group. Multiple Groupsails, Maritime Group Inport Training (MGIT), COMPTUEX, and JTFEX flexed the staff in a number of missions within the Surface, Strike, and Anti-Submarine/Undersea Warfare areas including Maritime Security, Show-of-Force, Mine Countermeasure, Anti-Piracy, MIO/VBSS, and TLAM Operations.

The squadron deployed with Enterprise Strike Group in 2006. DesRon 2 again accomplished a myriad of diverse missions across Second, Fifth, Sixth and Seventh Fleets.

As of June 2010, the squadron comprised USS Arleigh Burke, USS Barry, Stout, USS Laboon, USS Gonzalez, USS Bulkeley, and USS Mason. ComDesRon 2 will deploy with the Enterprise Strike Group.

In May 2019, 3 of these ships escort the USS Abraham Lincoln (CVN-72) : USS Bainbridge (DDG-96), USS Mason (DDG-87) and USS Nitze (DDG-94).
