= List of ship commissionings in 1960 =

The list of ship commissionings in 1960 includes a chronological list of all ships commissioned in 1960.

	Operator	Ship	Flag	Class and type	Pennant	Other notes
12 April	Steamship Company Bore	Bore	Finland	Ferry		
9 May	United States Navy	Preble		Farragut-class destroyer	DDG-46	
15 July	United States Navy	Coontz		Farragut-class destroyer	DDG-40	
9 November	United States Navy	Tullibee		Unique nuclear submarine	SSN-597	The first quiet nuclear submarine with turbo electric drive; The first integrated sonar suite, including both a low-frequency passive array, for long range detection, and a spherical array, for approach and attack (AN/BQQ Series Sonar); The first submarine specifically designed as an ASW (Anti-Submarine Warfare) weapon; The first submarine with torpedo tubes amidships.
17 November	United States Navy	King		Farragut-class destroyer	DDG-41	
6 December	Brazilian Navy	Minas Gerais		Colossus-class aircraft carrier	A11	Former HMS Vengeance.
10 December	United States Navy	Farragut		Farragut-class destroyer	DDG-37	
17 December	United States Navy	Henry B. Wilson		Charles F. Adams-class destroyer	DDG-7	
