= United States Navy 1975 ship reclassification =

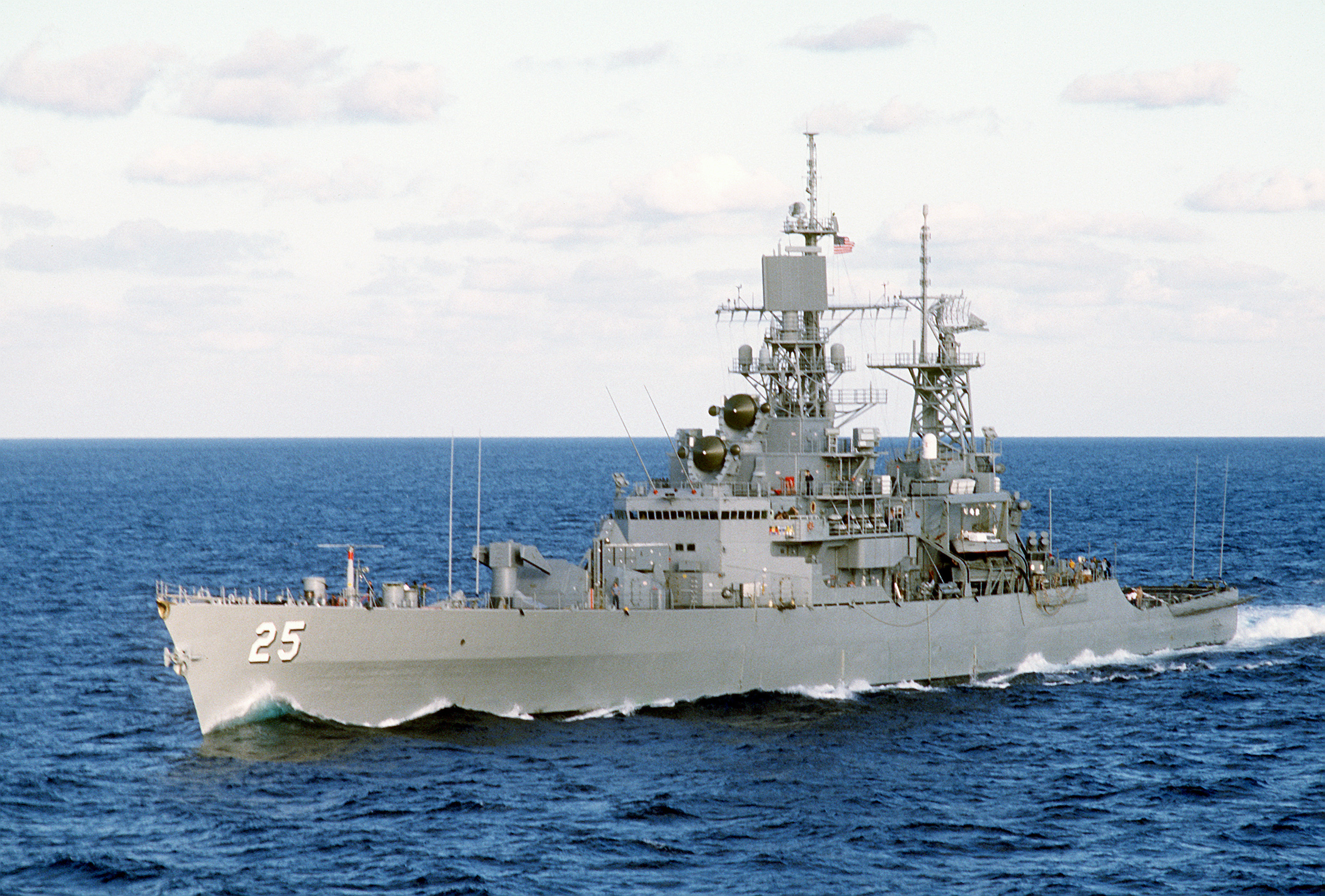
Guided Missile Cruiser USS Bainbridge (CGN-25) – formerly Frigate (DLGN-25)

The United States Navy reclassified many of its surface vessels in 1975, changing terminology and hull classification symbols for cruisers, frigates, and ocean escorts.

== Classification prior to 1975 ==
From the 1950s to 1975, the US Navy had three types of fast task force escorts and one type of convoy escort. The task force escorts were cruisers (hull classification symbols CAG/CLG/CG), frigates or destroyer-leaders (DL/DLG), and destroyers (DD/DDG); the convoy escorts were ocean escorts (DE/DEG), often called destroyer escorts as they retained the designation and number series of the World War II vessels. Added in the early 1970s was a new ocean escort called the patrol frigate (PF), another designation previously used in World War II, which was the initial designation of the Oliver Hazard Perry class. In 1975, these classifications were simplified to cruiser (CG), destroyer (DD/DDG), and frigate (FF/FFG).

Under the pre-1975 classification, cruisers were large vessels, the size of World War II gun cruisers, intended as the primary surface combatants. All but one (USS Long Beach (CGN-9)) were converted World War II gun cruisers (CL/CLG or CA/CAG), carrying either Talos or Terrier surface-to-air missiles (SAMs), and in some cases also Tartar missiles. The primary mission of these ships and the guided missile frigates was to intercept Soviet anti-ship cruise missiles. One cruiser was to be assigned to each carrier group. Most of the cruiser conversions were performed to rapidly deploy the new naval SAMs while the guided missile frigates were being designed and built. There were relatively few cruiser conversions, due to their cost and because the frigates could carry almost as many weapons as a cruiser.

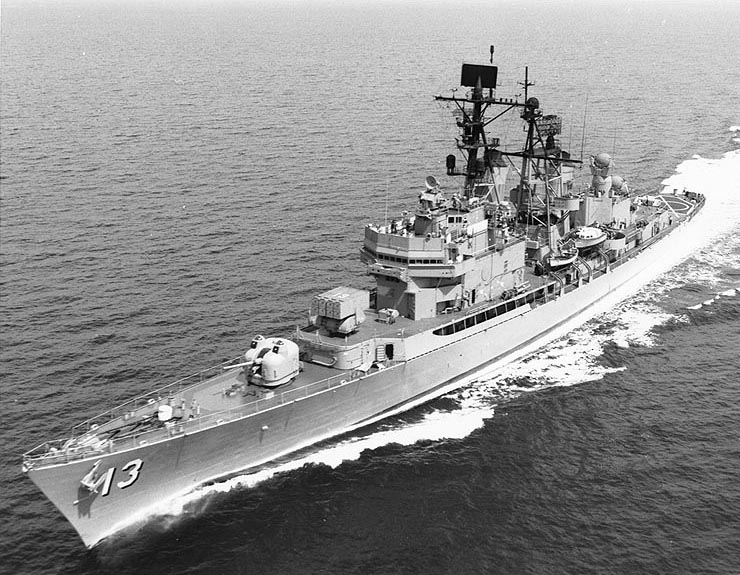
Guided Missile Destroyer USS William V. Pratt (DDG-44) Farragut class – formerly Frigate (DLG-13)

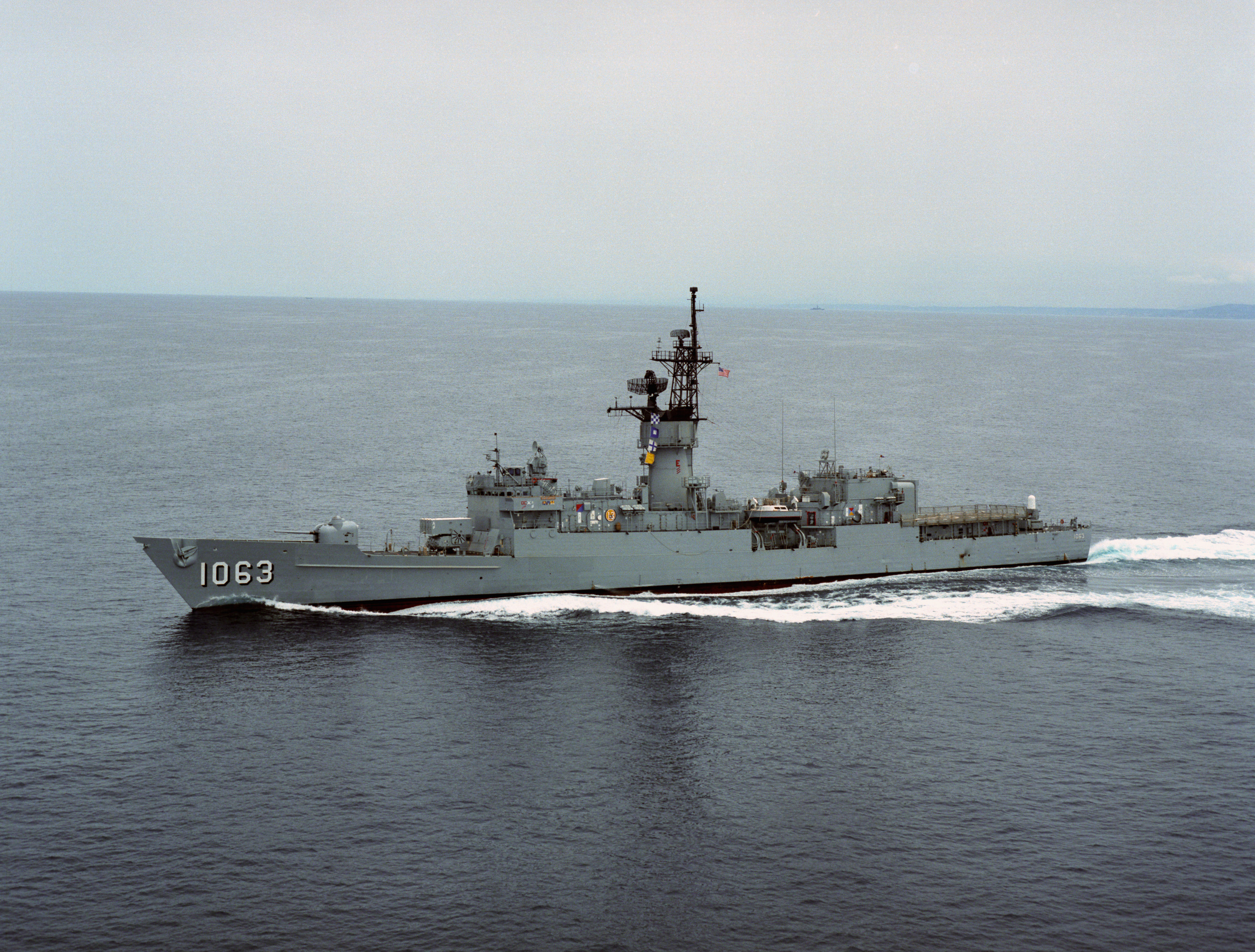
Frigate USS Reasoner (FF-1063), formerly Ocean Escort (DE-1063)

From 1950 to 1975, frigates were a new type, midway between cruiser and destroyer sizes, intended as major task force escorts. The first ship of the type was a redesignated ASW cruiser; the next four were very large AAW (gun) destroyers (DL), and the remainder were essentially oversize guided missile destroyers classified as DLGs. They carried the mid-range Terrier missile, but no offensive (strategic) weapons.

Destroyers were developed from the World War II designs as the smallest fast task force escorts. DDs were fast ASW ships; DDGs were AAW ships carrying the short-range Tartar missile.

Ocean escorts were an evolution of the World War II destroyer escort types. They were intended as convoy escorts and were designed for mobilization production in wartime or low-cost mass production in peacetime. DEs were ASW vessels; DEGs were AAW vessels with Tartar missiles.

The U.S. frigate classification was not used by any other navy; similar vessels were either cruisers or destroyers in foreign service. The ocean escort type corresponded to foreign frigates (convoy escorts).

== The "cruiser gap" ==
The Soviets defined "guided missile cruisers" as large warships armed with long range anti-ship missiles. The term "cruiser" included also two large helicopter carriers (Moskva class). The ships equivalent to U.S. frigates were classified as "large anti-submarine ships", but the larger of them were designated as "cruisers" by Western navies. This led to a conclusion, that by 1974, there were only six ships in U.S. service classified as cruisers, but the Soviets had 19 cruisers in service with seven more being built. (All totals exclude gun-only cruisers). All but two of the Soviet ships were relatively small vessels, roughly equivalent to U.S. frigates and far smaller than U.S. cruisers. However, most included a heavy anti-ship cruise missile battery that US surface combatants lacked until the introduction of the Harpoon missile circa 1980.

The differing U.S. and Soviet definitions of "cruiser" caused political problems when comparisons were made between U.S. and Soviet naval forces. A table comparing U.S. and Soviet cruiser forces showed six U.S. ships vs. 19 Soviet ships, despite the existence of 21 U.S. "frigates" equal or superior in size to the Soviet "cruisers". This led to the perception of a non-existent "cruiser gap".

== Closing the gap ==
To close this "gap," the U.S. frigate (DL/DLG) classification was eliminated on 30 June 1975. All the gun frigates (DL) had already been stricken or converted to DDGs. Most of the DLGs became cruisers (CG), but the smaller Farraguts became destroyers (DDG). All of the nuclear-powered DLGNs, existing or in construction, were redesignated as CGNs. The change from DLG to CG redefined "cruiser" as smaller ships, more like large destroyers. Cruiser classifications were also simplified, with the guided missile light cruisers (CLG) simply becoming CGs. Gun cruisers retained the "CA" designation although the last remaining gun cruiser, Newport News, was decommissioned three days earlier on 27 June 1975.

The ocean escorts (DE/DEG) and patrol frigates (PF) became frigates (FF) or guided missile frigates (FFG).

These changes brought U.S. Navy classifications into line with foreign classifications, and eliminated the perceived "cruiser gap."

Pre-30 June 1975	Post-30 June 1975
Cruiser (CA/CLG/CGN)	Guided Missile Cruiser (CG/CGN)
Frigate (DL/DLG/DLGN)	Guided Missile Cruiser (CG/CGN), Destroyer (DD), or Guided Missile Destroyer (DDG)
Destroyer (DD/DDG)	Destroyer (DD) or Guided Missile Destroyer (DDG)
Ocean Escort (DE/DEG)	Frigate (FF) or Guided Missile Frigate (FFG)
Patrol Frigate (PF)	Guided Missile Frigate (FFG)

A final change came on 1 January 1980, when the Ticonderoga class guided missile destroyers (DDG) became guided missile cruisers (CG).
