= Farragut-class destroyer =

Farragut-class destroyer may refer to two classes of destroyer of the United States Navy:

- Farragut-class destroyer (1934), a class of 8 ships launched 1934–1935
- Farragut-class destroyer (1958), a class of 10 ships launched 1958–1960
