= Farragut-class destroyer (1958) =

1958 Destroyer class of the US Navy

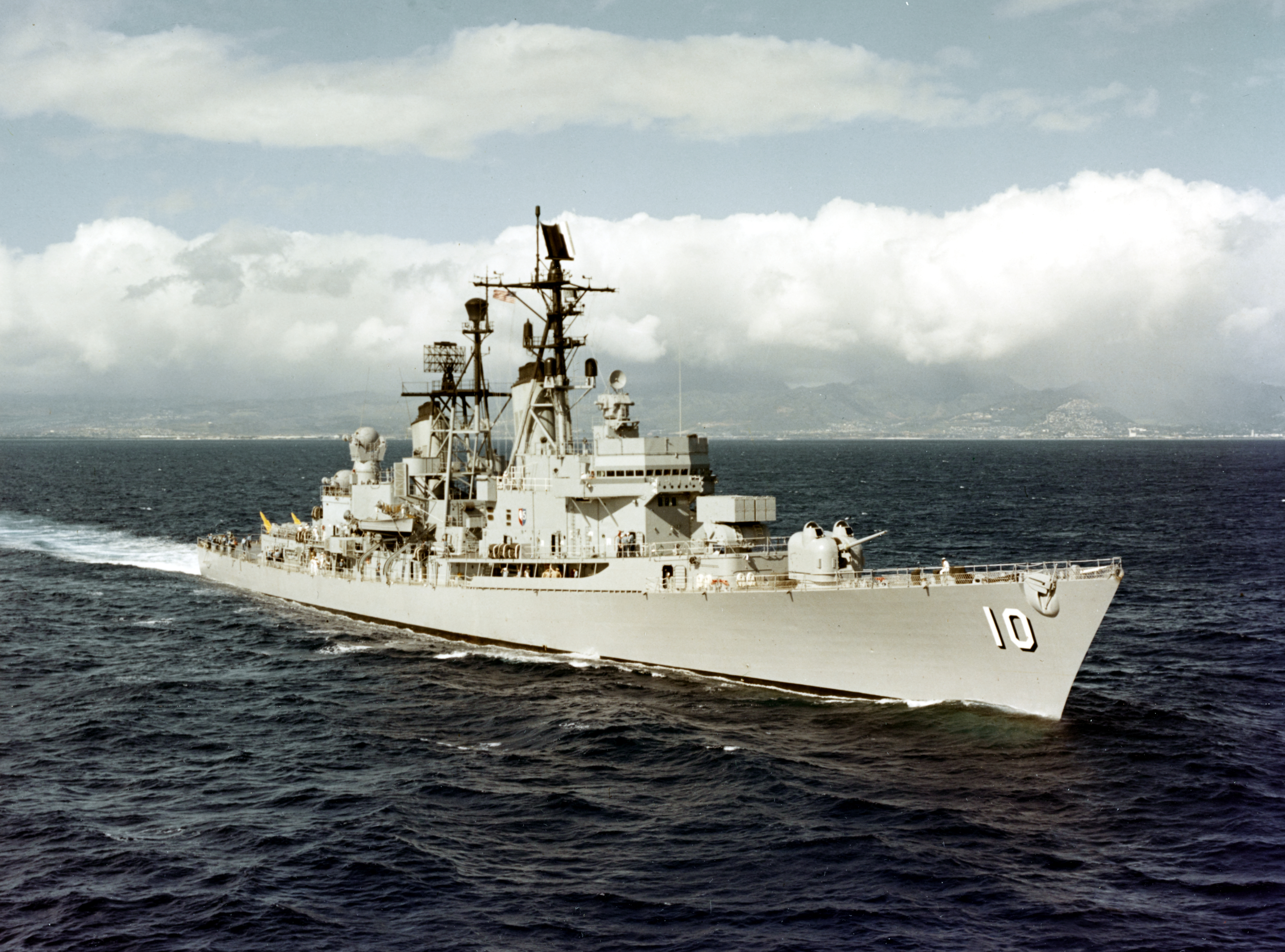
- USS King on 10 September 1961

Class overview
- Name: Farragut class
- Builders: Bethlehem Steel Quincy; Puget Sound Naval Shipyard; San Francisco Naval Shipyard; Philadelphia Naval Shipyard; Bath Iron Works
- Operators: United States Navy
- Preceded by: Forrest Sherman class
- Succeeded by: Charles F. Adams class (as Destroyer) Leahy class (as Destroyer Leader)
- Built: 1957–1961
- In commission: 1959–1993
- Completed: 10
- Scrapped: 10

General characteristics
- Type: Guided-missile destroyer
- Displacement: 4,167 long tons (4,234 t) (light); 5,648 long tons (5,739 t) (deep load)
- Length: 512 ft 6 in (156.2 m)
- Beam: 52 ft 4 in (16.0 m)
- Draft: 17 ft 9 in (5.4 m)
- Installed power: 85,000 shp (63,000 kW); 4 water-tube boilers; 2 Allis-Chalmers turbines or 2 De Laval turbines; 4 each 1,200-pound forced-draft Babcock & Wilcox D-type super heated boilers
- Propulsion: 2 shafts, 2 geared steam turbines
- Speed: 32 knots (59 km/h; 37 mph) (design)
- Range: 5,000 nautical miles (9,300 km; 5,800 mi) at 20 knots (37 km/h; 23 mph)
- Complement: 23 officers, 337 enlisted men
- Sensors & processing systems: 1 AN/SPS-10 surface search RADAR; 1 AN/SPS-49 air search RADAR; 1 AN/SPS-48 3D air search RADAR; 1 AN/SPG-53 gun fire control RADAR; 2 AN/SPG-55 Terrier fire control RADAR; AN/SQS-23 SONAR
- Electronic warfare & decoys: AN/SLQ-32(v)3 Electronic Warfare System; Mark 36 SRBOC Decoy Launching System
- Armament: 1 Mk 42 5-inch (127 mm)/54 dual-purpose gun; 1 Mk 10 Mod 0 missile launcher for Terrier SAM and later SM-1ER Standard Missile; 1 Mk 112 ASROC launcher; 2 12.75-inch (324 mm) Mark 32 Surface Vessel Torpedo Tubes; 2 twin 3"/50 gun mounts, later replaced by quad Mk 141 Harpoon anti-ship missile launchers

The Farragut-class destroyer was a group of 10 guided-missile destroyers built for the United States Navy (USN) during the 1950s. They were the second destroyer class to be named for Admiral David Farragut. The class is sometimes referred to as the Coontz class, since Coontz was first to be designed and built as a guided-missile ship (under project SCB 142), whereas the previous three ships were designed as all-gun units (under SCB 129) and converted later. The class was originally envisioned as a Destroyer Leader class (DL/DLG, verbally referred to as "Frigates"), but was reclassified as Guided-Missile Destroyers following the 1975 ship reclassification.

== Design and description ==
The Farragut class was the first class of missile-armed carrier escorts to be built from the ground up as such for the USN. The ships had an overall length of 512 feet 6 inches (156.2 m), a beam of 52 feet 4 inches (16.0 m) and a deep draft of 17 feet 9 inches (5.4 m). They displaced 5,648 long tons (5,739 t) at full load. Their crew consisted of 23 officers and 337 enlisted men.

The ships were equipped with two geared steam turbines, each driving one propeller shaft, using steam provided by 4 water-tube boilers. The turbines were intended to produce 85,000 shaft horsepower (63,000 kW) to reach the designed speed of 32 knots (59 km/h; 37 mph). The Farragut class had a range of 5,000 nautical miles (9,300 km; 5,800 mi) at a speed of 20 knots (37 km/h; 23 mph).

The Farragut-class ships were armed with a 5"/54 caliber Mark 42 gun forward. They were fitted with an eight-round ASROC launcher between the 5-inch (127 mm) gun and the bridge. The Farragut (DDG-37) was the only ship of her class that had an ASROC magazine mounted behind the launcher. The class was already top-heavy and the addition of the magazine reportedly made it worse, so the decision was made not to equip the other nine ships with magazines. Close-range anti-submarine defense was provided by two triple 12.75-inch (324 mm) Mk 32 torpedo tubes. The primary armament of the Farraguts was the Terrier anti-aircraft missile designed to defend the carrier battle group. They were fired via the dual-arm Mark 10 launcher and the ships stowed a total of 40 missiles for the launcher.

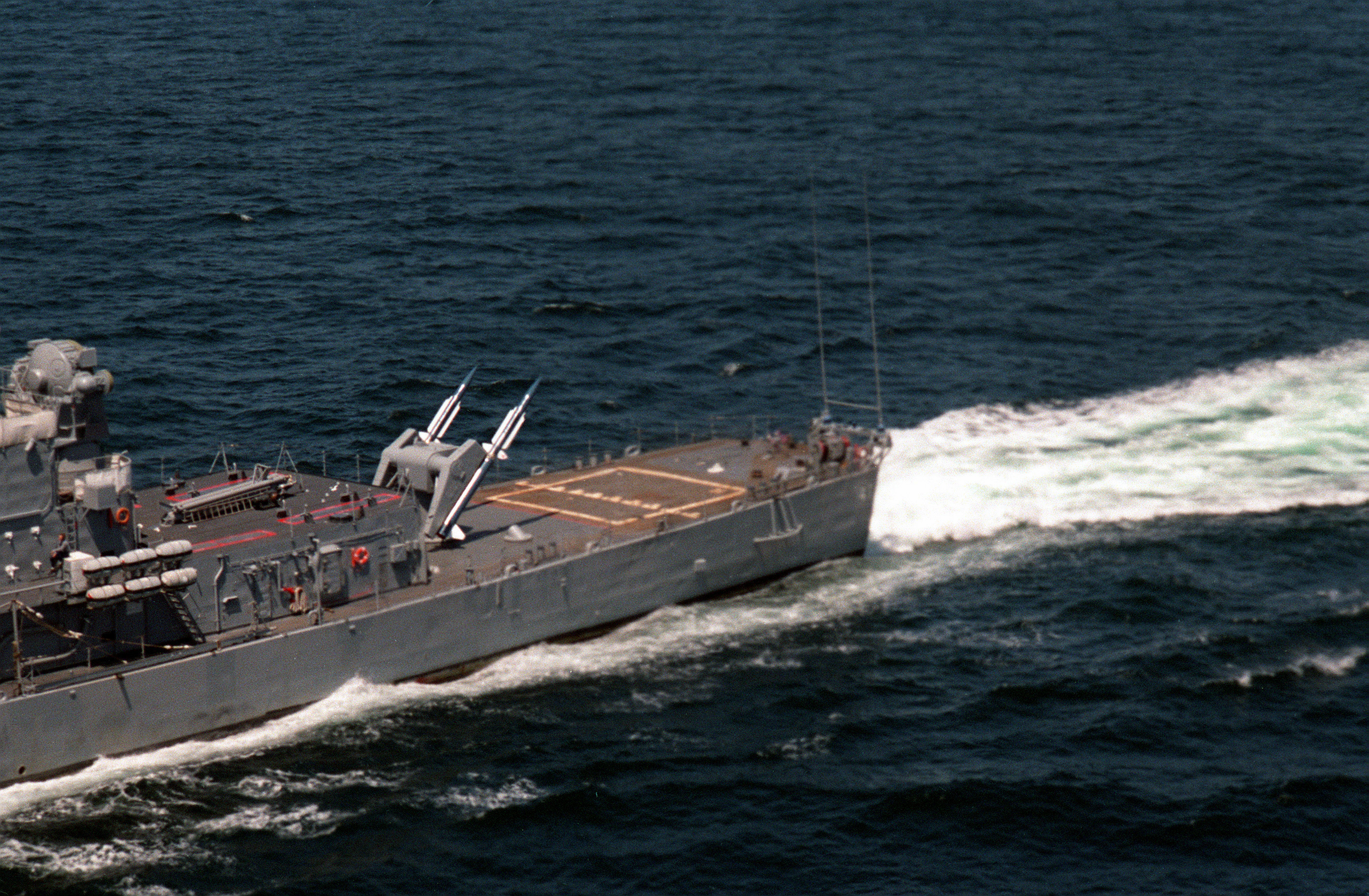
Stern of USS King (DDG-41) with Terrier missile launcher

== Service ==
Originally commissioned as guided-missile frigates (DLG), they were redesignated as guided-missile destroyers (DDG) under the fleet realignment in 1975. They were also the only redesignated ships to be renumbered as well under the realignment, with the first unit changing from DLG-6 to DDG-37 and all subsequent vessels being renumbered upwards in order. During various refits all ships had their two 3" gun mounts removed and replaced by two quad Harpoon anti-ship missile launchers and their fire control and search radars upgraded to handle SM-2ER missiles. All ships of the class were decommissioned between 1989 and 1994 and subsequently scrapped.

== Ships in class ==
Ships of the Farragut destroyer class
Name	Hull no.	Builder	Laid down	Launched	Commissioned	Decommissioned	Fate
Farragut	DDG-37 DLG-6	Bethlehem Steel Corporation, Fore River Shipyard	3 June 1957	18 July 1958	10 December 1960	31 October 1989	Struck 20 November 1992, sold for scrap
Luce	DDG-38 DLG-7	Bethlehem Steel Corporation, Fore River Shipyard	1 October 1957	11 December 1958	20 May 1961	1 April 1991	Struck 20 November 1992, sold for scrap
Macdonough	DDG-39 DLG-8	Bethlehem Steel Corporation, Fore River Shipyard	15 April 1958	9 July 1959	4 November 1961	23 October 1992	Struck 30 November 1992, sold for scrap
Coontz	DDG-40 DLG-9	Puget Sound Naval Shipyard	1 March 1957	6 December 1958	15 July 1960	2 October 1989	Struck 7 January 1990, sold for scrap
King	DDG-41 DLG-10	Puget Sound Naval Shipyard	1 March 1957	6 December 1958	17 November 1960	28 March 1991	Struck 20 November 1992, sold for scrap
Mahan	DDG-42 DLG-11	San Francisco Naval Shipyard	31 July 1957	7 October 1959	25 December 1960	15 June 1993	Struck 15 June 1993, sold for scrap
Dahlgren	DDG-43 DLG-12	Philadelphia Naval Shipyard	1 March 1958	16 March 1960	8 April 1961	31 July 1992	Struck 20 November 1992, sold for scrap
William V. Pratt	DDG-44 DLG-13	Philadelphia Naval Shipyard	1 March 1958	6 March 1960	4 November 1961	30 September 1991	Struck 20 November 1992, sold for scrap
Dewey	DDG-45 DLG-14	Bath Iron Works	10 August 1957	30 November 1958	7 December 1959	31 August 1990	Struck 20 November 1992, sold for scrap
Preble	DDG-46 DLG-15	Bath Iron Works	16 December 1957	23 May 1959	9 May 1960	15 November 1991	Struck 20 November 1992, sold for scrap

== See also ==
- Farragut-class destroyer (1934)
- List of United States Navy destroyer leaders
