= USS William V. Pratt =

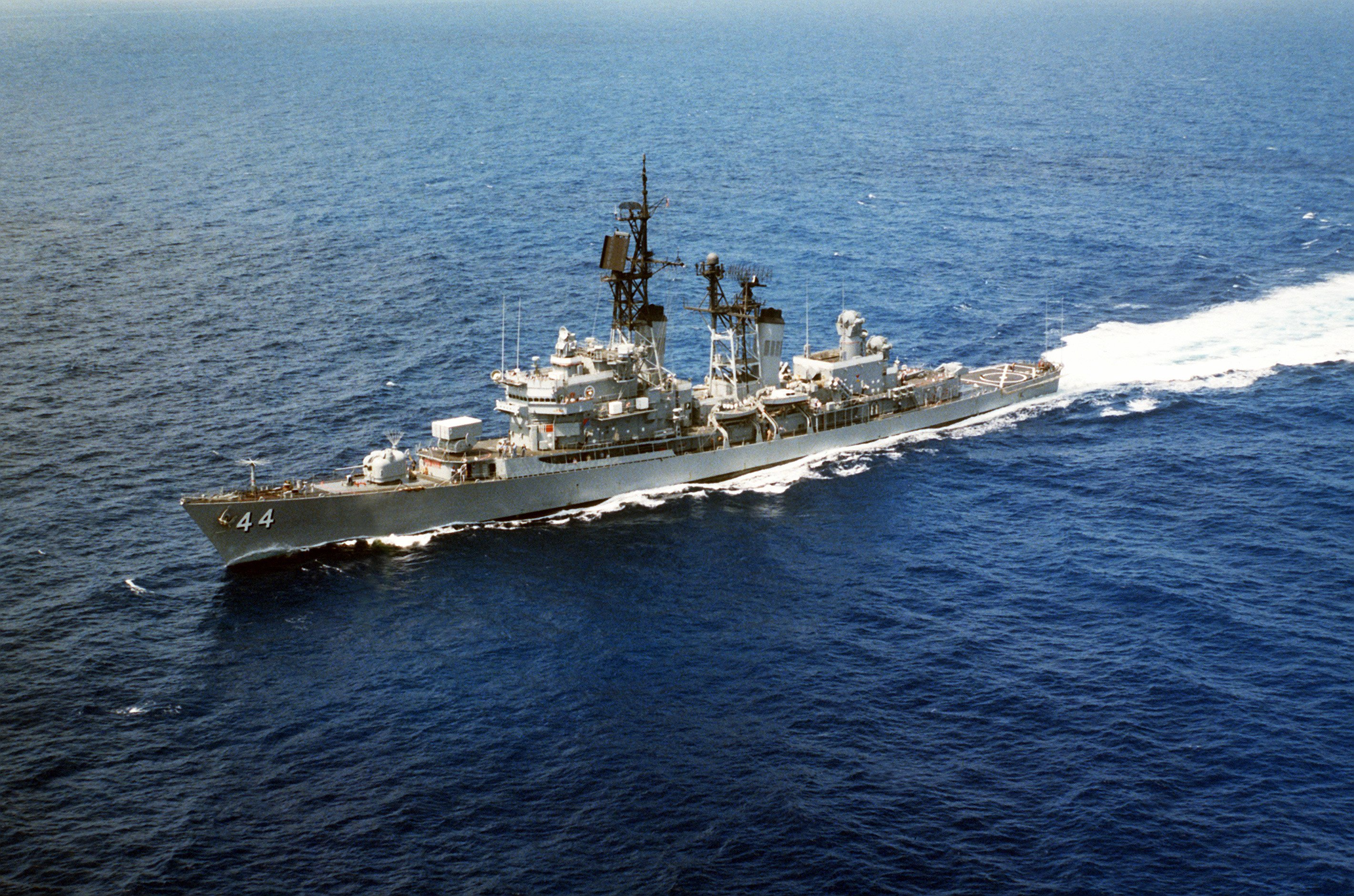
- USS William V. Pratt (DDG-44), 1987.

History

United States
- Name: William V. Pratt
- Namesake: William Veazie Pratt
- Ordered: 23 July 1956
- Builder: Philadelphia Naval Shipyard
- Laid down: 1 March 1958
- Launched: 6 March 1960
- Acquired: 19 October 1961
- Commissioned: 4 November 1961
- Decommissioned: 30 September 1991
- Stricken: 20 November 1992
- Identification: DDG-44
- Fate: Disposed of, sold by Defense Reutilization and Marketing Service (DRMS) for scrapping; 14 September 1995

General characteristics
- Class & type: Farragut-class guided missile destroyer
- Displacement: 5,800 tons
- Length: 512.5 ft (156.2 m)
- Beam: 52 ft (16 m)
- Draft: 25 ft (7.6 m)
- Propulsion: 4 x 1200psi boilers; 2 geared turbines
- Speed: 36.5 knots (67.6 km/h; 42.0 mph)
- Range: 4,500 nautical miles (8,300 km; 5,200 mi) at 20 knots (37 km/h; 23 mph)
- Complement: 377 (21 officers + 356 enlisted)
- Armament: 1 x Mk 42 5 in (130 mm)/54 caliber gun; Mark 46 torpedoes from two Mk-32 triple mounts; 1 x Mk 16 ASROC missile launcher; 1 x Mk 10 Mod 0 missile launcher for Standard Missile; 2 x Mk 141 Harpoon missile launchers

USS William V. Pratt (DLG-13/DDG-44) was a Farragut-class destroyer in the service of the United States Navy. She was commissioned in 1961 as DLG-13 and reclassified as a guided missile destroyer, designation DDG-44, in 1975. She was named to honor Admiral William Veazie Pratt, a President of the Naval War College and a Chief of Naval Operations.

== History ==
William V. Pratt (DLG-13) was laid down on 7 March 1958 by the Philadelphia Naval Shipyard; launched on 16 March 1960, sponsored by Mrs. William V. Pratt; and commissioned on 4 November 1961.

Following shakedown training in the West Indies and post-shakedown availability at Philadelphia, William V. Pratt joined Destroyer Squadron (DesRon) 18 as an active unit of the fleet in September 1962. Operating out of Naval Station Norfolk, Virginia, she cruised the Atlantic seaboard and the West Indies until 4 August 1963 at which time she departed Norfolk to participate in NATO exercise Operation Riptide IV, in European waters. She returned to Norfolk in September and resumed normal 2nd Fleet operations. That employment continued until 8 February 1964 when she embarked upon her first tour of duty with the 6th Fleet in the Mediterranean Sea. She returned to Norfolk on 9 August and once again took up her East Coast-West Indies routine. In September and October, she visited European waters again to participate in two NATO exercises, Operations Masterstroke and Teamwork. The warship returned to Norfolk on 20 October and resumed 2nd Fleet operations. In November, she began her first shipyard overhaul at Norfolk. She completed repairs on 26 March 1966 and put to sea for trials.

On 15 April she arrived in her new home port of Naval Station Mayport, Florida. She conducted refresher training in the Guantanamo Bay operating area in May and June and returned to Mayport on 3 July. The warship resumed East Coast operations until 27 August, at which time she deployed to the Mediterranean once again. That four-month deployment ended on 17 December when the guided missile frigate reentered Mayport. For the next six months, William V. Pratt conducted operations out of Mayport. She voyaged twice to the West Indies and once to the Gulf of Mexico. The warship also operated briefly off the Virginia Capes. In July 1966, she deployed to the Mediterranean for the third time in her career. She conducted operations with the 6th Fleet for the next five months, departing the Mediterranean for home on 10 December. She arrived back in Mayport 10 days later.

Following six months of normal operations along the East Coast and in the West Indies, William V. Pratt departed Mayport on 20 June 1967 for her only deployment to the western Pacific during the American involvement in the Vietnam War. En route, she transited the Panama Canal and made port calls at San Diego, Pearl Harbor, Midway, and Guam before arriving at Subic Bay in the Philippines on 28 July. Early in August, she departed the Philippines for the Gulf of Tonkin and duty on the northern sea-air rescue (SAR) station. She relieved USS Berkeley on 12 August and remained on station in the gulf until early in September. After upkeep in Subic Bay, she headed back to the Gulf of Tonkin late in the month to take up duty on the south SAR station. That tour of duty lasted until the latter part of November at which time she departed the gulf for port visits to Hong Kong and Kaohsiung on the island of Taiwan. She did one more period of duty on the south SAR station before leaving the western Pacific via Yokosuka in Japan, Midway Island, and Pearl Harbor. The warship arrived in San Diego on 31 December. On 2 January 1968, she resumed her voyage back to Mayport. William V. Pratt transited the Panama Canal on 10 January and reentered her home port on 16 January.

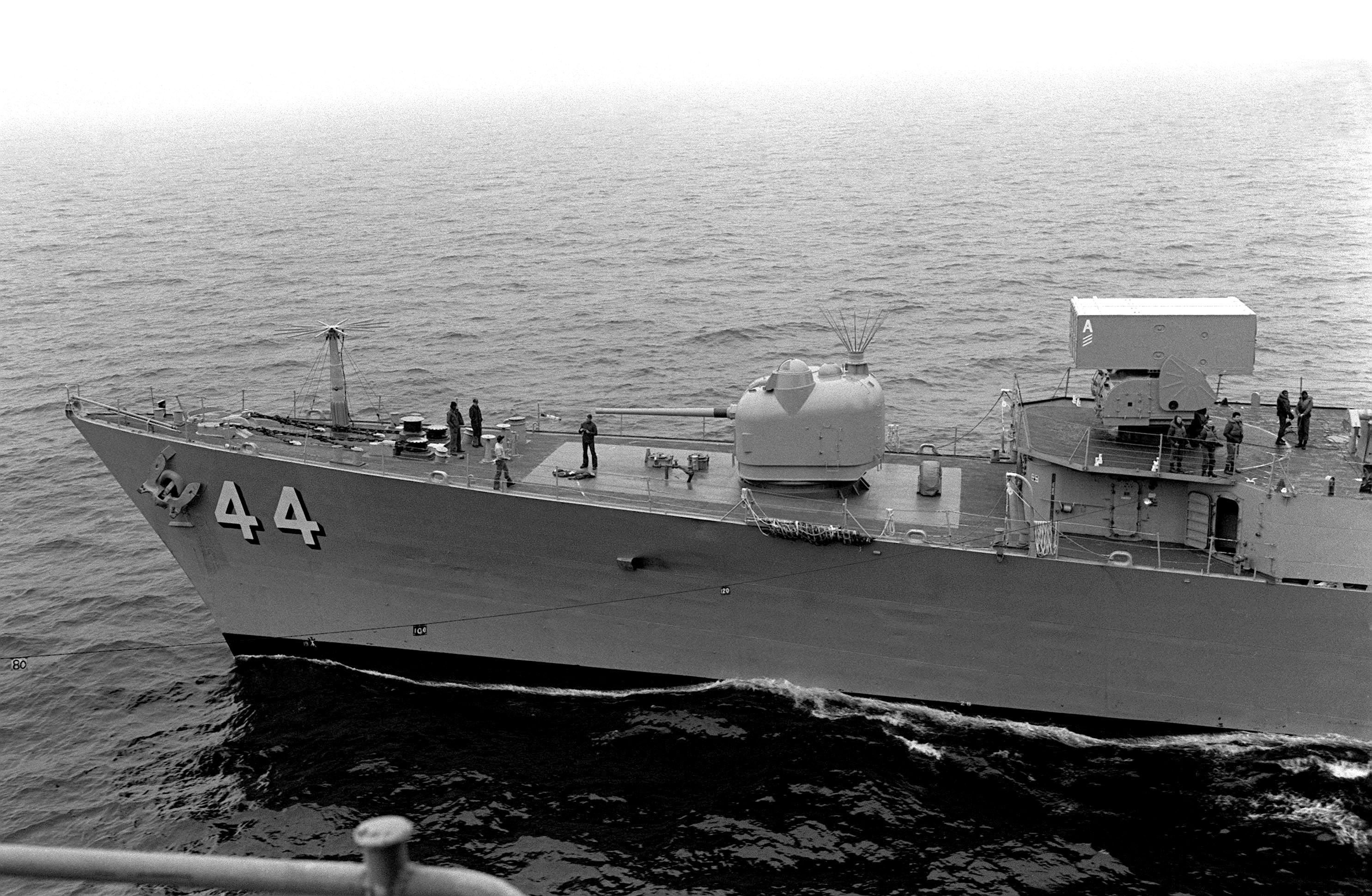
Port view of the bow of William V. Pratt showing the Mark 42 5-inch/54 caliber gun and the ASROC launcher.

In February 1968, the warship moved to Charleston to prepare for regular overhaul. On 1 March, she entered the Charleston Naval Shipyard and began a six-month repair period. She departed Charleston on 6 September and arrived back in Mayport two days later . After refresher training in the West Indies, William V. Pratt resumed her routine of alternating 2nd and 6th Fleet tours of duty. Over the next four years, the guided missile frigate was deployed to European waters once each year. She departed Mayport on 7 January 1969 and set a course for the Mediterranean. She reported for duty with the 6th Fleet on 18 January and, for the next five months, conducted the normal round of port visits and exercises. On 1 June she arrived in Rota, Spain for turnover ceremonies before heading north on the 3rd for a series of hunter/killer exercises and visits to northern European ports. She concluded that assignment on 7 July when she departed Portsmouth, England to return to the United States. The warship arrived back in Mayport on 15 July and resumed normal 2nd Fleet operations. That employment lasted until 30 April when she pointed her bow eastward again and headed for the Mediterranean. In addition to the usual exercises and port visits, that deployment included duty with a special contingency force assembled in the eastern Mediterranean in response to Syrian intervention in the Jordanian civil war on the side of militant, anti-government, Arab guerrillas. She steamed around off the Levantine coast from early September to early October before the American show of force succeeded in securing a Syrian withdrawal. The warship then resumed normal 6th Fleet operations until 1 November when she departed Barcelona, Spain, on her way home.

== 1970s ==
For the remainder of 1970 and during the first seven months of 1971, William V. Pratt operated out of Mayport along the East Coast and in the West Indies. Her 1971 deployment began early in August, but it consisted of a cruise to northern European waters for hunter/ killer exercises and visits to northern European ports rather than a Mediterranean cruise. She returned to Mayport on 8 October and, on 29 October, began converting her main propulsion plant to the use of Navy distillate fuel. She completed that modification on 17 January 1972 and resumed local operations until 18 February when she got underway for duty with the 6th Fleet. The warship participated in the usual schedule of training evolutions, multiship exercises, and port visits through the spring and early summer. On 28 June, after turnover ceremonies at Rota, the guided missile destroyer headed home. She reentered Mayport on 8 July and began post-deployment stand-down and preparations for her decommissioning incident to a major modernization overhaul. In September, she moved to Philadelphia for the antiaircraft warfare (AAW) modernization overhaul. William V. Pratt was decommissioned at the Philadelphia Naval Shipyard.

William V. Pratt was recommissioned at Philadelphia on 6 October 1973, Comdr. Rodney B. McDaniel in command. On the 23rd, she departed Philadelphia, bound for her new home port of Charleston, South Carolina She arrived at her destination on the 26th. The guided missile destroyer conducted post-overhaul shakedown training in December and resumed 2nd Fleet operations early in 1974. Those operations continued until 23 September at which time she departed Charleston to deploy to the Mediterranean once again. She changed operational control to the 6th Fleet at Naval Station Rota, Spain, on 2 October. The following day, the warship entered the Mediterranean proper and began operations as a unit of the screen for the aircraft carrier USS Independence. For the next five months, William V. Pratt conducted exercises with carriers Independence and Saratoga. She ranged the length and breadth of the "middle sea", making port visits and performing the usual training missions. On 8 March 1975, she conducted turnover at Rota and got underway for Charleston. The warship reentered her home port on 19 March and, after about a month of post-deployment stand-down for leave and upkeep, she resumed normal 2nd Fleet operations. Those missions brought an NROTC midshipman cruise in May and readiness exercises in June. On 1 July 1975, William V. Pratt was reclassified a guided missile destroyer and received the designation DDG-44. On 14 August, she departed Charleston to participate in UNITAS XVI, a series of multinational exercises conducted annually with units of various Latin American navies. Those exercises occupied her time for most of what remained of 1975. On 8 December, the warship arrived back in Charleston and began holiday leave and upkeep as well as preparations for a restricted availability.

The ship entered the Charleston Naval Shipyard on 15 December and remained there until 29 March 1976. She returned to Charleston on 7 April and resumed normal 2nd Fleet duty. That assignment - broken only by her participation in the International Naval Review held at New York on Independence Day - continued through the summer of 1976. On 4 October, William V. Pratt departed Charleston in company with USS Jesse L. Brown, USS Julius A. Furer, and USS Valdez for another tour of duty with the 6th Fleet in the Mediterranean. The ships arrived in Rota on 14 October, completed turnover briefings, and entered the Mediterranean on 16 October. The warship served in the screen of the aircraft carrier USS Franklin D. Roosevelt for the bulk of her 6th Fleet assignment. Once again, she visited ports and conducted exercises throughout the Mediterranean. That tour of duty with the 6th Fleet lasted until the beginning of April 1977. After turnover at Rota, the guided missile destroyer got under way on 11 April to return to the United States. She moored at Charleston once again on 21 April and, on 27 April, entered the Charleston Naval Shipyard for a 10-week availability. She completed repairs on 8 July and resumed 2nd Fleet training operations out of Charleston. That employment continued through the end of 1977 and into 1978. On 11 July 1978, she departed Charleston for another deployment to South American waters to participate in UNITAS XIX. During that cruise, she completed a circumnavigation of the South American continent while engaged in a series of readiness exercises with Latin American navies. She returned to Charleston on 3 December and spent the remaining days of the year in port.

William V. Pratt earned one battle star during the Vietnam War.

The rest of the 1970s saw her return once to the Mediterranean and make another UNITAS cruise, this time voyaging completely around South America. She received further combat systems updates in 1979-80, operated with the 6th Fleet and visited Northern European waters in 1981, and took part in Lebanon Crisis actions in 1982, including providing gunfire support for U.S. Marines at Beirut. She was the escort ship that escorted Yassar Arafat out of Lebanon to Piraeus, Greece.

William V. Pratt had three more major deployments during the last six years of the decade, operating in the Mediterranean, Indian Ocean and Red Sea in 1984, the Mediterranean alone in 1987 and again in 1989. Bracketing her 1989 6th Fleet cruise were major exercises off Norway and in the North Sea - English Channel area. In 1990 she worked with the U.S. Coast Guard on law enforcement service in the Caribbean Sea. William V. Pratt's final overseas tour was an important one, involving participation in the short, but intense Gulf War that drove Iraq out of Kuwait during the first months of 1991.

William V. Pratt was decommissioned on 30 September 1991 and stricken from the Naval Vessel Register on 20 November 1992 and sold for scrapping on 14 September 1995 to Transforma Marine of Brownsville, Texas for $49,600. William V. Pratt was dismantled shortly afterwards.
