= USS Dahlgren (DDG-43) =

United States Navy guided-missile destroyer

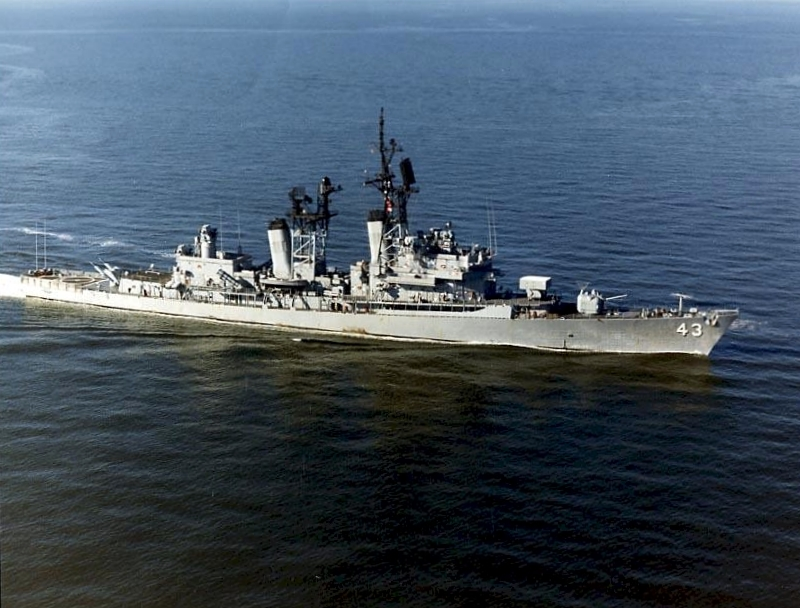
- USS Dahlgren (DDG-43) underway, ca. 1990

History

United States
- Name: Dahlgren
- Namesake: Rear Admiral John A. Dahlgren
- Ordered: 23 July 1956
- Builder: Philadelphia Naval Shipyard
- Laid down: 1 March 1958
- Launched: 16 March 1960
- Acquired: 31 March 1961
- Commissioned: 8 April 1961
- Decommissioned: 31 July 1992
- Stricken: 20 November 1992
- Identification: DDG-43
- Fate: Disposed of by scrapping, 28 March 2006

General characteristics
- Class & type: Farragut-class guided missile destroyer
- Displacement: 5,800 long tons (5,900 metric tons)
- Length: 512.5 ft (156.2 m)
- Beam: 52 ft (16 m)
- Draft: 25 ft (7.6 m)
- Propulsion: 4 x 1,200 psi (8.3 MPa) boilers; 2 x geared turbines
- Speed: 36.5 knots (67.6 km/h; 42.0 mph)
- Range: 4,500 nmi (8,300 km; 5,200 mi) at 20 kn (37 km/h; 23 mph)
- Complement: 377 (21 officers + 356 enlisted)
- Armament: 1 x Mk 42 5 in (130 mm)/54 caliber gun; Mark 46 torpedoes from two Mk-32 triple mounts; 1 x Mk 16 ASROC missile launcher; 1 x Mk 10 Mod.0 missile launcher for Standard Missile; 2 x Mk 141 Harpoon missile launchers

USS Dahlgren (DLG-12/DDG-43) was the 7th ship in the Farragut-class guided missile destroyer in the United States Navy. She was launched on 16 March 1960 by Philadelphia Naval Shipyard and sponsored by Mrs. Katharine D. Cromwell, granddaughter of Rear Admiral John Adolphus Dahlgren. She was commissioned on 8 April 1961. She was the third ship in the Navy to bear the name. Commissioned as DLG-12, Dahlgren was reclassified a guided missile destroyer on July 1, 1975 and given the new hull number DDG-43. The ship saw service until 1992, when she was placed in reserve. She was sold for scrapping three times, the first time in 1994, but was repossessed twice as the ship breaking companies failed. The ship was finally dismantled in 2006.

== Fate ==
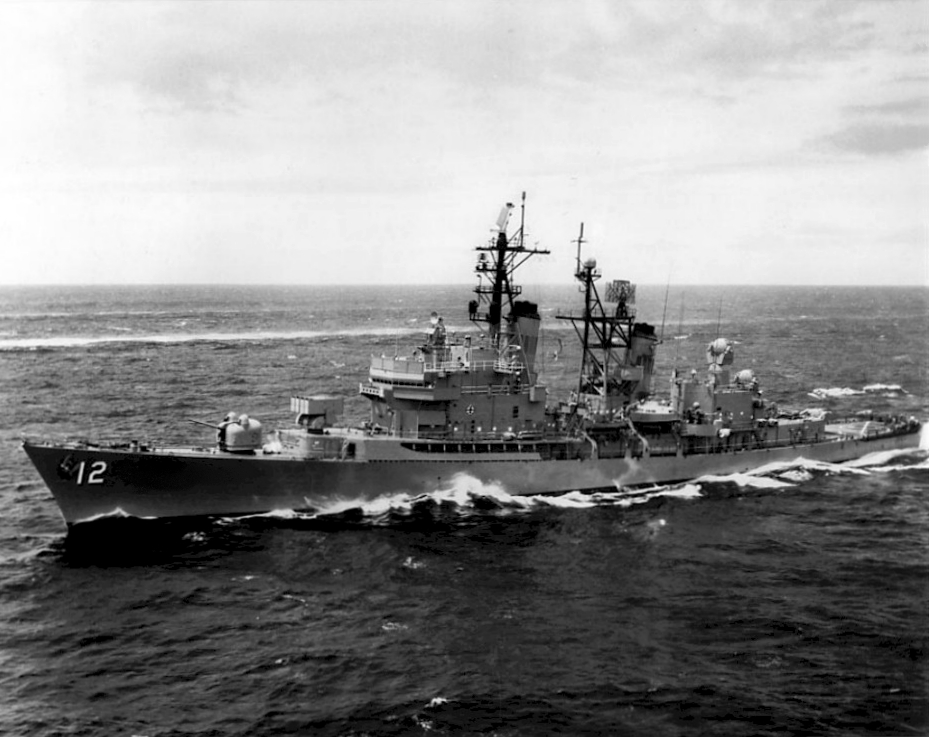
USS Dahlgren (DLG-12) underway off Oahu, 1967.

Dahlgren was decommissioned 31 July 1992 and stricken from the Naval Vessel Register on 20 November 1992. Dahlgren was transferred to the James River Reserve Fleet on 1 July 1993. Dahlgren was sold to N.R. Acquisition, New York, New York on 15 April 1994 for $283,711.78 for scrapping. N.R. Acquisition then subcontracted the actual scrapping to Wilmington Resources of Wilmington, North Carolina. Wilmington Resources changed their name to Sigma Recycling in January 1996 and then lost their permits to dismantle ships on 24 July 1996.

Dahlgren was among 10 ships repossessed by the Navy on 30 September 1996. Upon being returned to the Navy, Dahlgren was sold to International Shipbreakers of Brownsville, Texas on 10 February 1999. Dahlgren was repossessed for a second time on 10 July 2000 after the scrap yard failed to take delivery of the ship in a timely manner. On 29 July 2005, a contract was issued to ESCO Marine of Brownsville, Texas to dismantle Dahlgren for $2,653,018. on 28 March 2006, Dahlgren ceased to exist.
