= USS Coontz =

US Navy destroyer

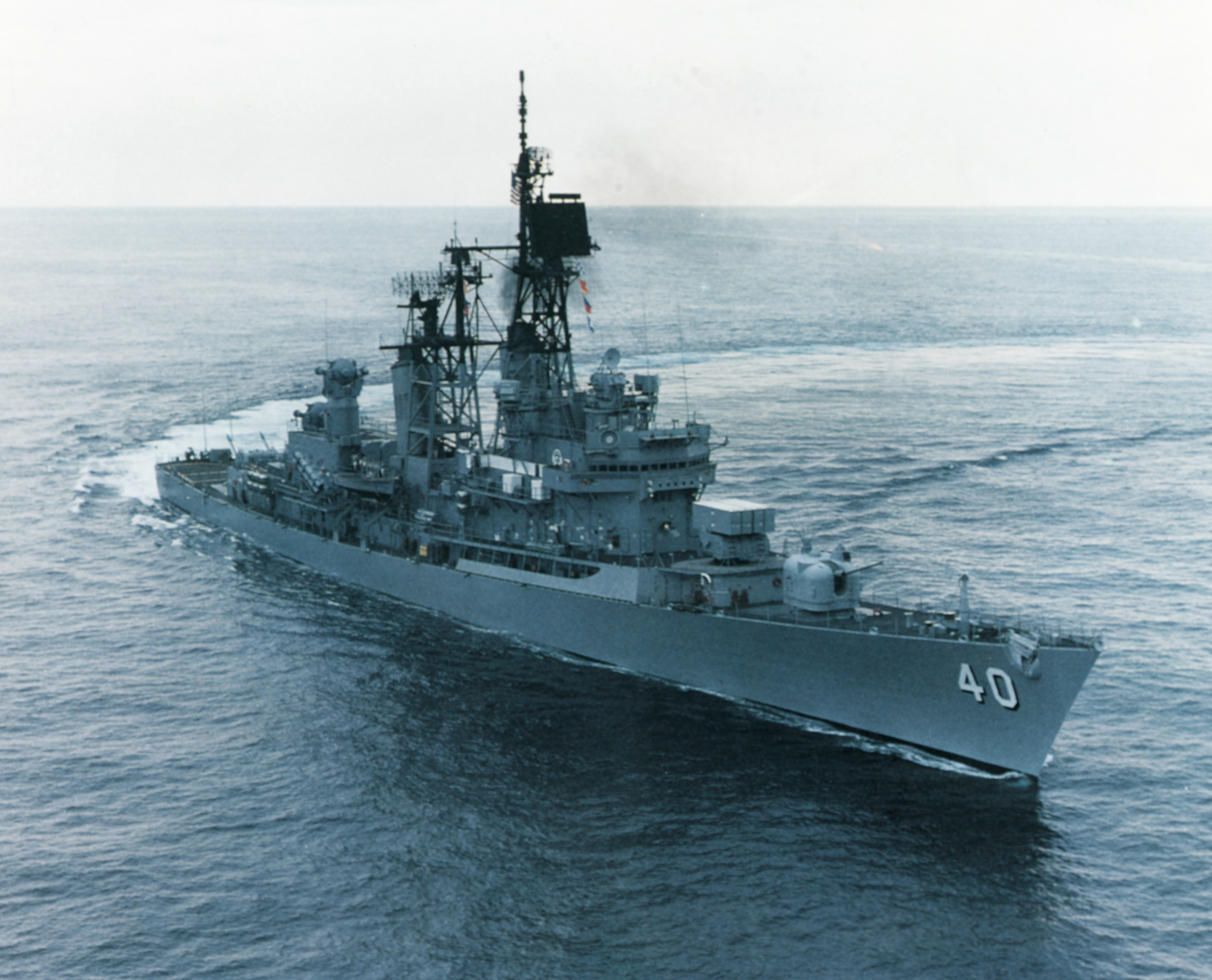
- The USS Coontz underway in the Atlantic, off the Virginia coast, October 1986. USS Coontz underway in the Atlantic, off the Virginia coast, October 1986.

History

United States
- Name: Coontz
- Namesake: Robert Coontz
- Builder: Puget Sound Naval Shipyard
- Laid down: 1 March 1957
- Launched: 6 December 1958 as Guided Missile Frigate (DLG-9).
- Commissioned: 15 July 1960
- Decommissioned: 2 October 1989
- Reclassified: 1 July 1975 as Guided Missile Destroyer (DDG-40)
- Fate: Sold for scrap, February 1999
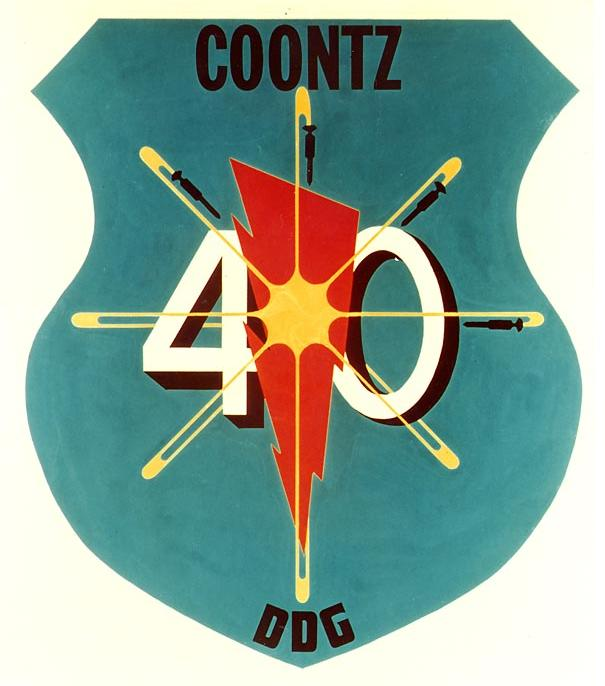
- Badge

General characteristics
- Class & type: Farragut-class destroyer leader/frigate
- Displacement: 5,648 tons (full)
- Length: 512 ft 6 in (156.21 m) (oa)
- Beam: 52 ft 4 in (15.95 m)
- Draft: 17 ft 9 in (5.41 m) (max)
- Propulsion: 85,000 shp (63,000 kW); geared turbines, 2 screws
- Speed: 33 knots (61 km/h; 38 mph)
- Range: 5,000 nmi (9,300 km) at 20 knots (37 km/h)
- Complement: 377
- Armament: 1 x RIM-2 Terrier surface-to-air missile system; 1 x ASROC ASW system; 6 x 12.75 in (324 mm) Mk 32 torpedo tubes; 8 x Harpoon SSM (After third update); 1 x 5 in (127 mm)/54 cal Mk 42 gun mount

USS Coontz (DLG-9/DDG-40) was a Farragut-class destroyer leader/frigate in the United States Navy. She was named after Admiral Robert Coontz, the US Navy's second chief of naval operations.

Commissioned in 1960, she spent the early part of her career in the Pacific Ocean, participating in four tours of duty during the Vietnam War. In the early 1970s she transferred to the east coast and spent the remainder of her service years in the Caribbean Sea, Atlantic Ocean, Mediterranean Sea, and Persian Gulf. She assisted in saving USS Stark after that ship was hit by Iraqi missiles. In 1975, as part of the Navy's reclassification process, all ships of her class were reclassified as guided missile destroyers (DDG).

Coontz was decommissioned in 1989, and sold for scrap five years later. Her transom nameplate was salvaged and donated to the city of Hannibal, Missouri, birthplace of Admiral Coontz.

== Construction and commissioning ==
Coontz's keel was laid at Puget Sound Naval Shipyard in March 1957, 39 years after Admiral Coontz left his post as the shipyard's commander. The first guided-missile frigate to be built on the West Coast, and the second ship to bear the name of the Navy's second chief of naval operations, Coontz was christened by Mrs. Robert J. Coontz, wife of the admiral's grandson, on 6 December 1958.

Coontz was commissioned on 15 July 1960 and completed post-shakedown training in April 1961. Coontz was commissioned 6 months ahead of Farragut, the lead ship of the class, some references refer to the class as Coontz-class frigates/destroyers. Coontz then became a unit of the Cruiser-Destroyer Force U.S. Pacific Fleet and joined the First Fleet as flagship of Destroyer Division 152, home port in San Diego, California. Commander, Destroyer Squadron 15 flew his flag in Coontz from 4 May to 12 July 1961.

== DLG-9 ==
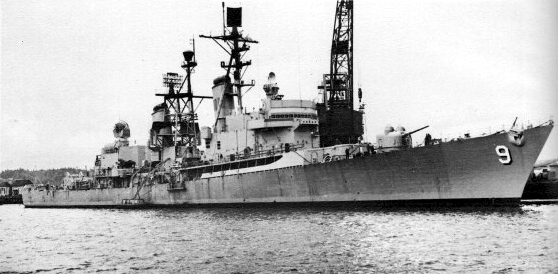
Coontz at Puget Sound, circa 1959.

Coontz departed from San Diego on 10 August 1961 and joined the Seventh Fleet as a unit of the fast carrier task force. Remaining with the Seventh Fleet for more than seven months, Coontz steamed 55,000 nautical miles (102,000 km; 63,000 mi) and visited ports in Japan, Korea, Hong Kong, B.C.C, Australia and American Samoa. While conducting training exercises to maintain full combat readiness, Coontz received the coveted "E" award for excellence in missilery.

Coontz returned to the United States on 23 March 1962 to rejoin the U.S. First Fleet and became the flagship of the Commander, Destroyer Squadron 17 in April 1962. On the second anniversary of her awards for excellence in Operations, Engineering and Gunnery, Coontz flew the flag of the Commander, Cruiser-Destroyer Flotilla 11 from 1 August to 11 November 1962, when she again became the flagship for Commander, Destroyer Squadron 17. In October 1962 Coontz left San Diego and sailed out to sea about 200 nautical miles (370 km; 230 mi) to provide protection for the Camp Pendleton Marine transports just in case they were needed during the Cuban Missile Crisis.

Commander James R. Collier relieved Captain Reis in July 1962. Coontz sailed with the Seventh Fleet in Asiatic waters, visiting Yokosuka, Kobe, Kure and Beppu in Japan and Hong Kong, B.C.C in China. During this time Coontz was also designated a stand-by recovery ship for NASA's Mercury-Atlas 8 space mission. During the space flight on 3 October 1962, Wally Schirra orbited the Earth at an altitude of 100 miles (160 km). Although Coontz was listed as a stand-by ship for recovery operations, the vessel was not activated. Coontz returned to the U.S. in May 1963. In June 1963, Coontz demonstrated the kill capability of the Terrier surface-to-air missile in a sea power demonstration for President John F. Kennedy.

=== First modernization ===
Coontz was overhauled and her missile weapons systems extensively modernized from October 1963 to April 1964 at the Long Beach Naval Shipyard. Commander Eugene C. Kenyon Jr. relieved Commander Collier on 7 March 1964.

Upon rejoining the Pacific Fleet in April 1964, Coontz successfully completed comprehensive weapons systems qualification trials and refresher training. Prior to departure for the Western Pacific on 5 August 1964, Coontz was awarded the Missile, Gunnery and engineering "E" award for combat excellence in these areas. On 3 August 1964, Coontz again became the flagship for Commander, Destroyer Squadron 17.

=== First Vietnam tour ===
Coontz joined the U.S. Seventh Fleet on 16 August 1964 as a unit of the fast carrier task force for six months. She steamed 41,000 miles (66,000 km) and visited Subic Bay, Philippines, Hong Kong, B.C.C., Sasebo and Yokosuka, Japan. In December 1964, Coontz was awarded the Armed Forces Expeditionary Medal for support of Vietnam War operations in the South China Sea. Her third Western Pacific tour completed, Coontz returned to the operational control of the Commander, First Fleet and returned to the United States on 6 February 1965.

Operations in the First Fleet included participation in the 1965 summer midshipmen training cruise. Coontz visited Bellingham, Washington; San Francisco, California; and Hilo and Pearl Harbor, Hawaii during this cruise. The "E", "C" and "A" awards were received during this period for excellence in engineering, communications and anti-submarine warfare. On 14 August 1965, Commander W. Cummings relieved Commander Kenyon as commanding officer.

=== Second modernization ===
From December 1965 to January 1966, Coontz received a Helicopter Landing and Handling Capability in San Diego. This conversion included relocation of deck vents, clearing all fantail obstructions, installation of a JP-5 fuel handling and purification system, and the introduction of equipment to provide Helicopter Starting and Service power. Coontz was the first of her class to receive the conversion and proudly boasted the addition of a helicopter to her many-faceted capabilities.

=== Second Vietnam tour ===
Coontz departed San Diego in January 1966 for a regular deployment as a unit of the U.S. Seventh Fleet for a total of six months. Coontz visited Shimoda, Shizuoka and Yokosuka, Japan; Subic Bay, Philippines, and Kaohsiung, Formosa. In March 1966, Coontz was awarded the Unit Commendation Ribbon for her WESTPAC performance.

On 1 July 1966, three North Vietnamese torpedo boats emerged from a port and moved to attack Coontz and USS Rogers, steaming 55 miles (89 km) offshore on search and rescue operations. Carrier planes sank all of the torpedo boats with bombs, rockets and cannon fire. Coontz picked up 19 North Vietnamese sailors who were later exchanged for American POWs captured in South Vietnam.

After completing her fourth Western Pacific route, Coontz changed operational control of Commander, First Fleet and returned to the United States 1 August 1966. In late September, the ship entered Long Beach Naval Shipyard for a regular overhaul.

After departing Long Beach Naval Shipyard in March 1967, Coontz returned to San Diego and commenced a training and upkeep period.

=== Third Vietnam tour ===
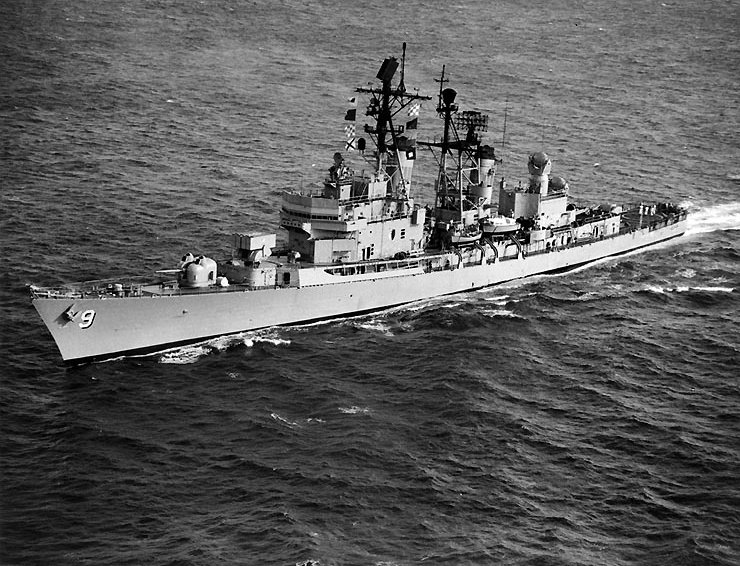
Coontz off Oahu, 1968.

Coontz departed San Diego for WESTPAC on 25 July 1967. While deployed in the Western Pacific, Coontz was again attached to the U.S. Seventh Fleet and on search-and-rescue duty as well as aircraft carrier operations and special assignments. Commander E. Dale Geiger relieved Commander Cummings as Commanding Officer on 28 July 1967 while Coontz was en route to WESTPAC on her fifth tour with the U.S. Seventh Fleet. In August 1967, Coontz made an operational visit to Jakarta, Indonesia; the first U.S. warship to visit the nation since early 1963. Coontz then spent two 30-day periods in the Northern Search and Rescue Station in the Tonkin Gulf and participated in the rescue of nine aviators. After a brief visit to Hong Kong, B.C.C., Coontz headed for her home port, San Diego, via Sydney, Australia and Wellington, New Zealand, Pago Pago American Samoa and Pearl Harbor, arriving in San Diego 8 February 1968.

During the leave and upkeep period a Test and Evaluation Monitoring System (TEAMS) was installed for evaluation during operations with the First Fleet. This was the first automatic test system to be installed in the surface fleet. The operations included participation in the summer midshipmen cruise. Ports visited during this cruise were San Francisco, Seattle, and Pearl Harbor. Coontz then took part in First Fleet operations; including exercise Beat Cadence until Deploying on 15 November 1968.

=== Fourth Vietnam tour ===
Coontz arrived on Yankee Station one month later and spent Christmas on the line. On 8 February 1969, Commander Donald P. Roane relieved Commander Geiger as Commanding Officer before Coontz made a visit to Hong Kong, B.C.C.

Coontz returned to the Gulf of Tonkin for another Search and Rescue mission before going north for upkeep at Yokosuka, Japan. After an EC-121 aircraft was shot down by North Korean jets, Coontz was rushed into the Sea of Japan. From that assignment, Coontz returned to San Diego via Subic Bay on 18 May.

=== Third modernization ===
Leave and upkeep followed. In September 1969, Coontz participated in a HUKASWEX operation at sea as a unit of the First Fleet. After several more sea periods, Coontz went into an extensive upkeep period. During the year of 1969, Coontz won awards for excellence in Supply, Operations and ASW. The upkeep continued until deployment on 3 March 1970. On 8 July 1970, Commander Roane was relieved as Commanding Officer by Commander T.J. Bowen.

In January 1971, shortly after her last Seventh Fleet tour, Coontz departed San Diego via the Panama Canal for Atlantic waters and a major overhaul and modernization at the Philadelphia Naval Shipyard. In conjunction with this work, Coontz DLG-9 was decommissioned on 23 February 1971. After extensive anti-air warfare modification, Coontz was recommissioned on 18 March 1972 and transferred to her new home port of Newport, Rhode Island. Commander T.R.M.Emery was assigned to Coontz as Commanding Officer on 8 March 1972.

After a six-month test period in Guantánamo Bay, Cuba and other operations in the Caribbean, Coontz sailed on a "show the flag" cruise to South America and Africa. Subsequently, she entered Boston Naval Shipyard for a three-month Post Shakedown Availability. Following extensive training and preparation, Coontz departed on 6 July 1973 for her first deployment with the United States Sixth Fleet, operating in the Mediterranean Sea. Commander Emery was relieved as Commanding Officer by Commander F.N. Howe on 20 December 1973.

In January 1974 Coontz changed home port from Newport to Norfolk, Virginia. She departed 15 November 1974 for a Mediterranean Sea deployment, participating in numerous U.S. and NATO exercises.

== DDG-40 ==
As part of a major re-designation of several classes of ships, Coontz was redesignated guided-missile destroyer 40 (DDG-40) on 1 July 1975. The ship's next deployment was on 17 January 1976 as part of the Standing Naval Forces Atlantic (STANAVFORLANT). The force operated in Caribbean, U.S. and Canadian waters with ships from four NATO navies prior to a transit to Northern Europe where Coontz visited 8 countries and participated in numerous NATO exercises. Commander Howe was relieved as commanding officer by Commander Silas O. Nunn III on 6 March 1976. Nunn was later relieved as commanding officer by Commander W. P. Martin on 8 April 1978.

After a one-year regular overhaul in Norfolk Naval Shipyard, Coontz departed on 21 July 1978 for comprehensive gunnery, missile and Harpoon system qualifications and refresher training at Guantánamo Bay, Cuba.

After returning home, Coontz participated in six months of local operations including GULFEX 78 in November 1978. In 1979 she served again with STANAVFORLANT, as flagship, hosting more than 35,000 visitors in 8 NATO countries and participating in various exercises with over 30 NATO ships. STANAVFORLANT operations included areas above the Arctic Circle, in the Baltic Sea, North Sea and the Norwegian Sea. Commander Martin was relieved as Commanding Officer by Commander C.P. Willoz on 28 September 1979.

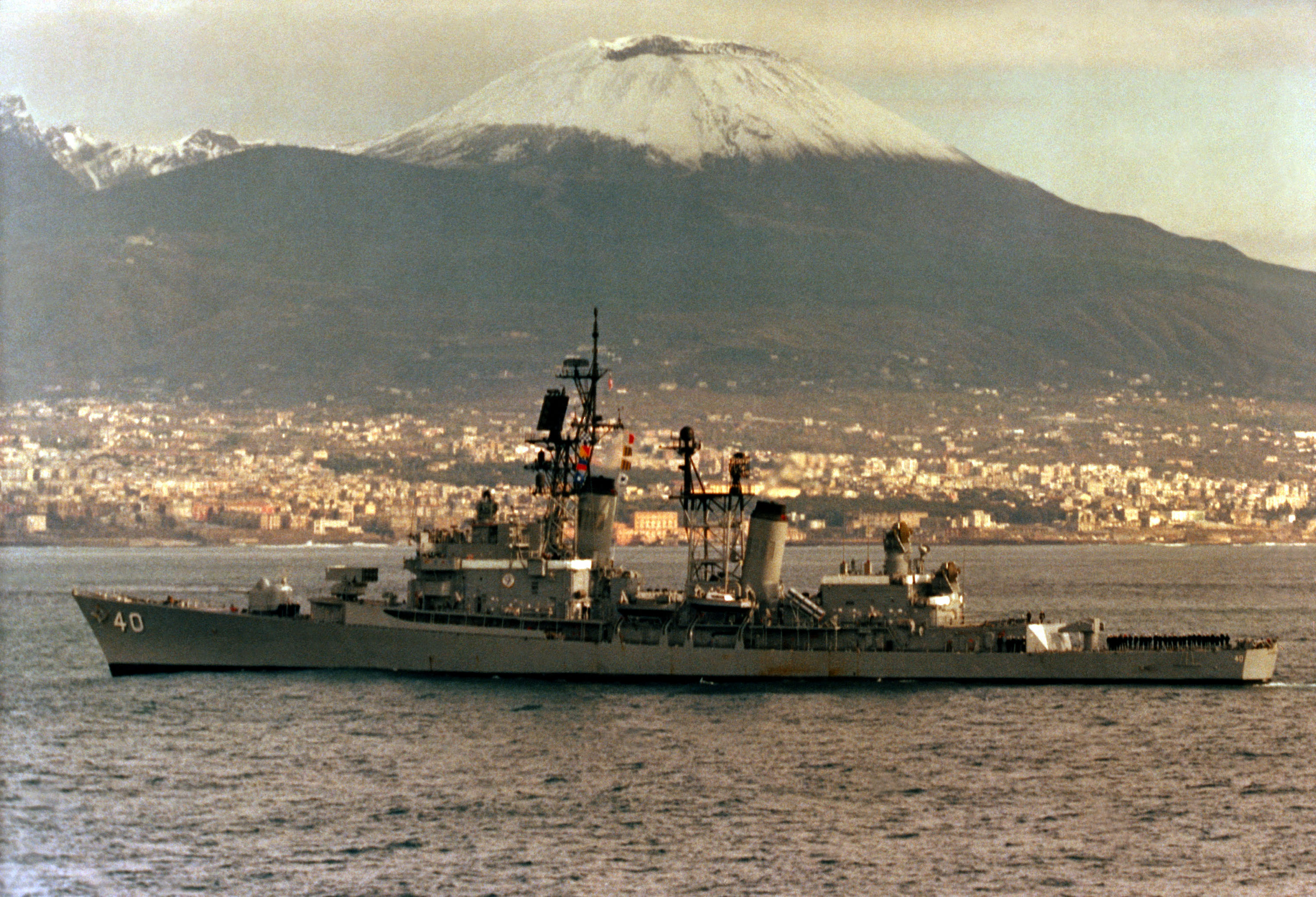
USS Coontz in 1980.

On 14 July 1981, Coontz accidentally fired a live Harpoon missile about 60 nautical miles (110 km) off St. Croix. The island was in range of the missile and it was fired toward the island, but a search by Coontz and aircraft from the carrier USS Dwight D. Eisenhower found no debris. The US Navy concluded that the Harpoon harmlessly impacted the sea since no trace of it was ever found.

In the fall of 1981, Coontz deployed again. This cruise included port visits in Western Africa as part of the West African Training Cruise, operations in the Mediterranean Sea and a transit into the Black Sea followed by a port visit to Dubrovnik, Yugoslavia. Commander Willoz was relieved as Commanding Officer by Commander J.P. Reason on 6 September 1981.

Coontz participated in operations around the Eastern coast of Central America in mid 1982 making the first visit to Bonaire, Netherlands Antilles by a U.S. Navy ship in more than 13 years. In July of that year Coontz entered the Philadelphia Naval Shipyard for a one-year regular overhaul, undergoing various configuration changes and equipment additions. During this yard period, Commander Reason was relieved as Commanding Officer by Commander L.P. Brooks Jr. on 17 December 1982. Coontz completed overhaul on time in July 1983.

=== Operation Urgent Fury-Grenada ===
Three months out of overhaul in October 1983, Coontz steamed to the Caribbean Sea for weapons systems testing. While undergoing tests, Coontz received immediate tasking and altered course to join Operation Urgent Fury, the invasion of Grenada. The ship provided gunfire support and small boat interdiction for ten consecutive days in support of the amphibious assault. For this action, Coontz was awarded the Armed Forces Expeditionary medal and the Meritorious Unit Commendation.

=== Final operations ===
In 1984, Coontz underwent pre-deployment work up including refresher training and a major fleet exercise. Upon completion, Coontz deployed to the Mediterranean Sea in October conducting operations in the Eastern Mediterranean off the coast of Beirut, Lebanon and in the Black Sea. Commander Brooks was relieved as Commanding Officer by Commander Charles H. Gnerlich on 25 February 1985. Coontz returned to Norfolk in May 1985.

From August to October 1985, Coontz underwent her first Phased Maintenance Availability, a new concept involving short periods of intense industrial work designed to maximize operational availability rather than placing ships in prolonged overhauls.

In November 1985, Coontz participated in Operation Bold Eagle, a joint exercise conducted with the US Army and US Air Force in Florida and the Gulf of Mexico. Coontz coordinated with airborne Air Force AWACS aircraft and Army ground units for air defense.

Coontz's next joint exercise was Ocean Venture '86. Coontz, along with Navy ships and Coast Guard cutters conducted quarantine operations exercises in the Caribbean operating areas. During this time Coontz requalified her Naval Gunfire Support Team at the Vieques Island Range near Puerto Rico.

In November 1986 Coontz was awarded her first and only Battle Efficiency Award. In addition she earned all eight line department awards in the areas of Navigation/Deck Seamanship, Main Propulsion, Damage Control, Anti-Air Warfare, Anti-Submarine Warfare, Anti-Surface Warfare, Electronic Warfare, and Communications.

In late 1986 and early 1987, Coontz underwent a work up period in preparation for deployment to the Persian Gulf on 5 February 1987. During her deployment, she served under the Commander, Middle East Forces. Coontz was tasked with ensuring the safe passage of all U.S. vessels as well as maintaining U.S. presence in the Persian Gulf during the escalation of the Iran–Iraq War. Commander Gnerlich was relieved as Commanding Officer by Commander William W. Cobb, Jr. on 11 April 1987. During deployment in the Persian Gulf, Coontz provided firefighting teams which aided in the rescue of USS Stark and her crew after she was struck by Iraqi Exocet missiles. Coontz returned to her home port of Norfolk, Virginia on 5 August 1987. Following a three-month maintenance availability (SRA) she operated as part of the United States Second Fleet until the end of her career.

== Decommissioning ==
Commander Cobb was relieved as Commanding Officer by Commander W.E. Cox on 21 July 1989. Commander Cox oversaw the decommissioning of Coontz in Philadelphia, Pennsylvania on 2 October 1989. She was sold for scrapping in April 1994, but had to be repossessed in October 1996. The ship was sold again in February 1999 to Metro Machine of Philadelphia. Although a few bits and pieces of her remain in private collections, the bulk of the ship was dismantled. The scrapping of USS Coontz was completed on 26 March 2003 in Philadelphia, with the scrap metal being sold to Camden Iron and Metal in Camden, New Jersey.

In 2006, the USS Coontz Association, composed of former officers and crew of USS Coontz, obtained the transom of ship from a private collector who had saved it from the scrap heap. The transom, which bears the name of the ship, was then donated to the city of Hannibal, Missouri, birthplace of the ship's namesake, Admiral Robert. E. Coontz. On 31 March 2007, several former crew members of Coontz, Navy deputy chief of information Admiral Nathan Jones and Hannibal city officials dedicated the transom at Nipper Park. The dedication occurred 50 years to the month after the laying of the keel of the ship.
