= USS Farragut (DDG-37) =

US Navy guided-missile destroyer

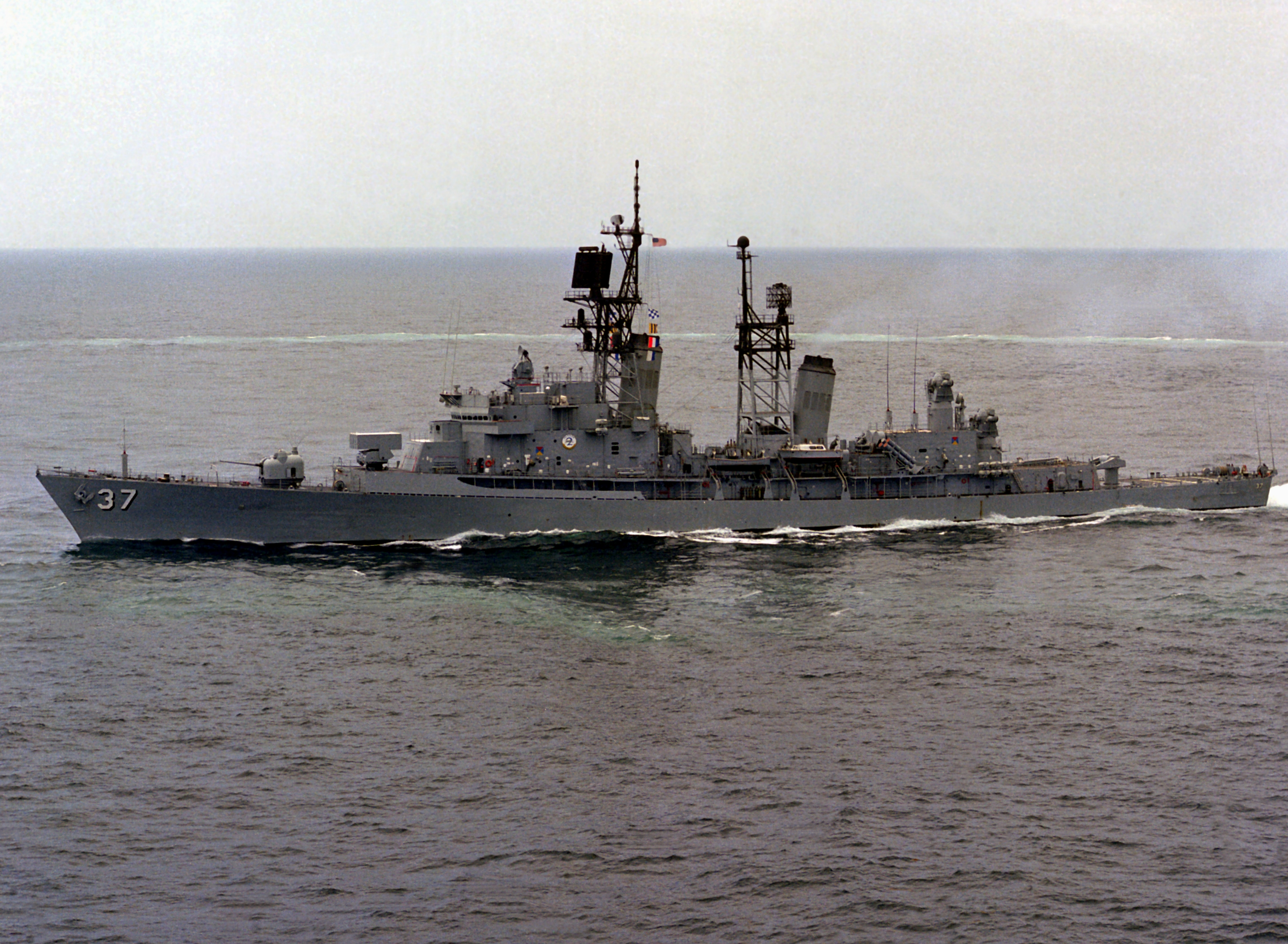
- USS Farragut (DDG-37)

History

United States
- Name: Farragut
- Namesake: Admiral David Farragut
- Ordered: 27 January 1956
- Builder: Bethlehem Steel Corporation, Quincy, Massachusetts
- Laid down: 3 June 1957
- Launched: 18 July 1958
- Acquired: 8 December 1960
- Commissioned: 10 December 1960
- Decommissioned: 30 October 1989
- Reclassified: 30 June 1975
- Stricken: 20 November 1992
- Motto: Damn the torpedoes, full speed ahead!
- Fate: Dismantled

General characteristics
- Class & type: Farragut-class guided missile destroyer
- Displacement: 5,800 tons (full load)
- Length: 512.5 ft (156.2 m)
- Beam: 52 ft (15.8 m)
- Draught: 25 ft (7.6 m)
- Propulsion: 4 1200psi boilers, 2 geared turbines
- Speed: 36.5 knots (67.6 km/h; 42.0 mph)
- Range: 4,500 nautical miles (8,300 km; 5,200 mi) at 20 knots (20 mph; 40 km/h)
- Complement: 377 (21 officers + 356 enlisted)
- Sensors & processing systems: AN/SPS-48 3D air search radar; AN/SPS-49 2D air search radar; AN/SPS-10 surface search radar; 2 × AN/SPG-55 fire control radar; AN/SPG-53 gun fire control radar
- Electronic warfare & decoys: AN/SLQ-32; 2 Mark 36 SRBOC Decoy Launching System for Super Rapid Bloom Off-board Chaff (SRBOC)
- Armament: 1 × Mk 42 5-inch/54 (127 mm/54) caliber gun; 2 × Mk-32 triple mounts carrying Mark 46 torpedoes; 1 × Mk 16 RUR-5 ASROC missile launcher; 1 × Mk 10 Mod.0 missile launcher for Standard Missile; 2 × Mk 141 Harpoon missile launchers

USS Farragut (DLG-6/DDG-37) was the lead ship of her class of guided-missile destroyers (originally destroyer leaders) built for the United States Navy during the 1950s.

== Design and description ==
The Farragut class was the first class of missile-armed carrier escorts to be built as such for the USN. The ships had an overall length of 512 feet 6 inches (156.2 m), a beam of 52 feet 4 inches (16.0 m) and a deep draft of 17 feet 9 inches (5.4 m). They displaced 5,648 long tons (5,739 t) at full load. Their crew consisted of 23 officers and 337 enlisted men.

The ships were equipped with two geared steam turbines, each driving one propeller shaft, using steam provided by 4 water-tube boilers. The turbines were intended to produce 85,000 shaft horsepower (63,000 kW) to reach the designed speed of 32 knots (59 km/h; 37 mph). The Farragut class had a range of 5,000 nautical miles (9,300 km; 5,800 mi) at a speed of 20 knots (37 km/h; 23 mph).

The Farragut-class ships were armed with a 5"/54 caliber Mark 42 gun forward and two twin mounts for 3-inch/50-caliber guns, one on each broadside amidships. They were fitted with an eight-round ASROC launcher between the 5-inch (127 mm) gun and the bridge. The Farragut (DDG-37) was the only ship of her class that had an ASROC magazine mounted behind the launcher. The class was already top-heavy and the addition of the magazine reportedly made it worse, so the decision was made not to equip the other nine ships with magazines. Close-range anti-submarine defense was provided by two triple sets of 12.75-inch (324 mm) Mk 32 torpedo tubes. The primary armament of the Farraguts was the Terrier anti-aircraft missile designed to defend the carrier battle group. They were fired via the dual-arm Mark 10 launcher and the ships stowed a total of 40 missiles for the launcher.

== Construction and career ==
Farragut, named for Admiral David Glasgow Farragut, was laid down as DLG-6 by the Bethlehem Steel Corporation at Quincy, Massachusetts, on 3 June 1957, launched on 15 July 1958 by Mrs. H. D. Felt, wife of the Vice Chief of Naval Operations and commissioned on 10 December 1960. Farragut was reclassified as a guided missile destroyer on 30 June 1975 and designated DDG-37. USS Farragut was decommissioned on 31 October 1989, stricken from the Naval Vessel Register on 20 November 1992 and sold for scrap on 16 December 1994. On 26 September 2006 a contract to dismantle ex-Farragut was awarded to International Shipbreaking Limited of Brownsville, Texas. The ship's bell is currently being kept and preserved at Admiral Farragut Academy in St. Petersburg, Florida.
