= USS King (DDG-41) =

American guided missile destroyer (1960–1991)

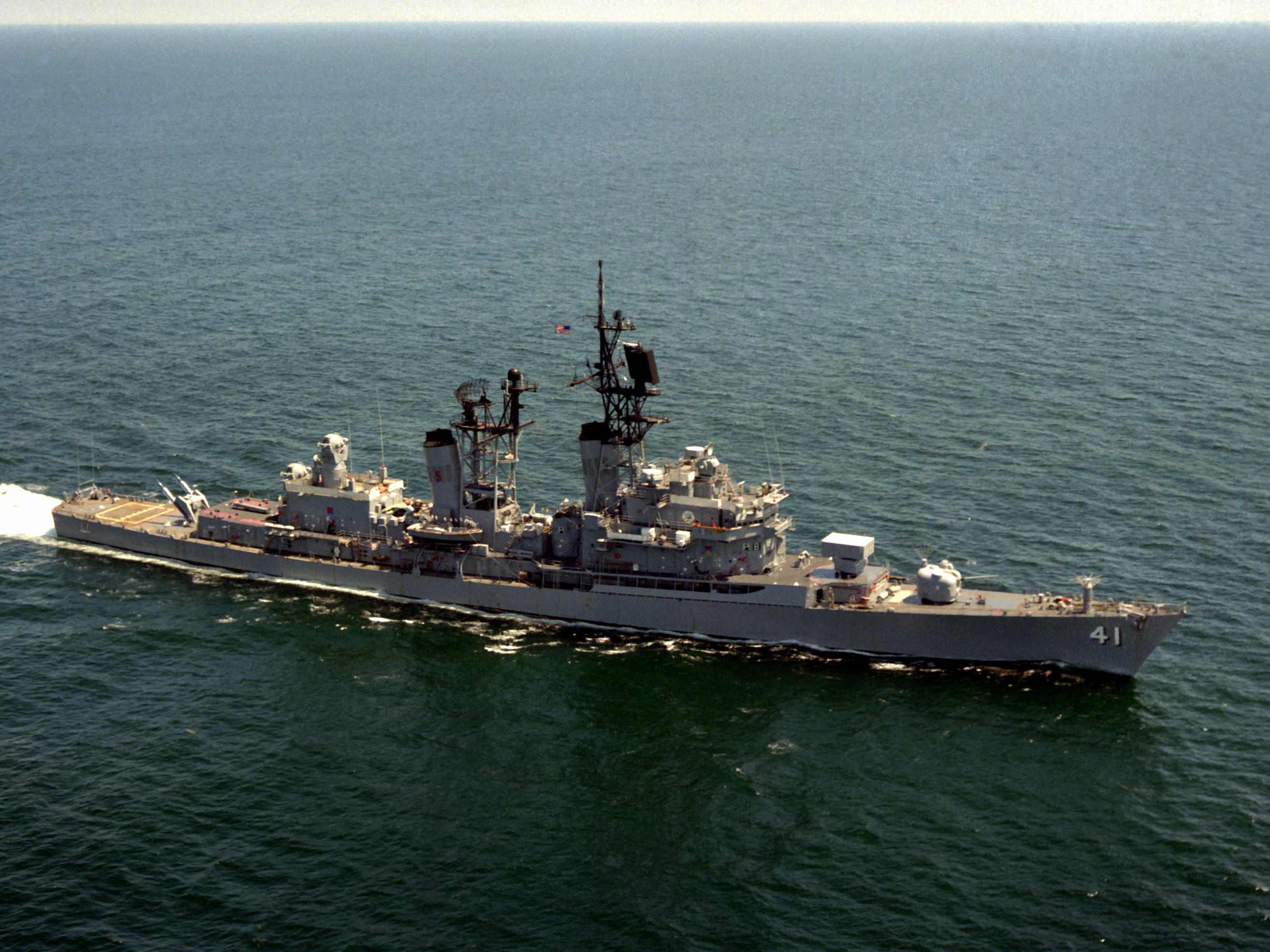
- USS King (DDG-41) underway in 1983

History

United States
- Name: King
- Namesake: Ernest Joseph King
- Ordered: 18 November 1955, as DL-10 (Destroyer Leader)
- Builder: Puget Sound Naval Shipyard
- Laid down: 1 March 1957
- Launched: 6 December 1958
- Commissioned: 17 November 1960
- Decommissioned: 28 March 1991
- Reclassified: DLG-10 (Guided Missile Destroyer Leader), 14 November 1956; DDG-41 (Guided Missile Destroyer), 30 June 1975
- Stricken: 20 November 1992
- Motto: Manu Tenere Mare Supremus
- Fate: Sold, 15 April 1994, and broken up, 1995

General characteristics
- Class & type: Farragut-class destroyer
- Displacement: 5,648 long tons (5,739 t) full
- Length: 512 ft 6 in (156.21 m) o/a
- Beam: 52 ft 4 in (15.95 m)
- Draft: 17 ft 9 in (5.41 m)
- Propulsion: Geared turbines, 2 screws, 85,000 shp (63,384 kW)
- Speed: 33 knots (61 km/h; 38 mph)
- Range: 5,000 nmi (9,300 km) at 20 kn (37 km/h; 23 mph)
- Complement: 360
- Armament: 1 × Terrier missile SAM system; 1 × ASROC ASW system; 6 × 12.75 in (324 mm) Mark 32 Torpedo Tubes; 1 × 5"/54 caliber Mark 42 gun (Mk.68 Gun Fire Control System); 2 × twin 3"/50 caliber guns (removed during AAW modernization, 1975); 2 × quadruple Harpoon missile launchers (added in 1985)

USS King (hull number DL-10/DLG-10/DDG-41) was a Farragut-class guided missile destroyer in the United States Navy. She was named for Fleet Admiral Ernest Joseph King (1878–1956), the 9th Chief of Naval Operations, best known for leading the U.S. Navy during World War II.

King was laid down by the Puget Sound Navy Yard at Bremerton in Washington on 1 March 1957, launched on 6 December 1958 and commissioned on 17 November 1960.

King was reclassified as a guided missile destroyer leader on 14 November 1956 and designated DLG-10. King was again reclassified as a guided missile destroyer on 30 June 1975 and designated DDG-41.

== Service history ==
After shakedown along the coast, and in Hawaiian waters, King continued training out of San Diego for the remainder of 1961. Following extensive preparations the guided-missile frigate sailed on her first WestPac cruise, 7 June 1962, strengthening the 7th Fleet with her Terrier missile arsenal. Operating with this peacekeeping force, King helped to check Communist aggression in Southeast Asia.

Upon returning San Diego on 31 December, she resumed tactical exercises off the West Coast until 1 August 1963 when she departed on her second WestPac cruise. Once again her operations with the 7th Fleet helped maintain stability in the Far East. King returned San Diego 10 March 1964 and conducted operations along the coast, for the rest of the year constantly perfecting her fighting skills and increasing the peacekeeping ability of the Navy.

King headed back for the Far East 5 April 1965 escorting the aircraft carrier USS Oriskany. She operated from the South China Sea during May screening carriers and participating in air-sea rescue work. She continued to serve off Vietnam until returning to San Diego on 2 November.

The guided missile destroyer operated off the West Coast until heading back for the Western Pacific 26 May 1966. On this cruise she carried a helicopter for search and rescue missions to save American pilots during strikes against North Vietnam. She arrived at Da Nang, South Vietnam, on 27 June. During July she saved five downed aviators, including one who was rescued from deep within North Vietnam by the ship's helicopter crew. In August the ship was stationed in a positive identification and radar advisory zone (PIRAZ) in the Gulf of Tonkin to help protect American ships from enemy aircraft. Before she was relieved, she had checked over 15,000 aircraft. During this duty she also rescued seven pilots whose planes had gone down during strikes against enemy targets. She continued this duty, except for brief runs to Hong Kong and Subic Bay, until relieved by USS Long Beach on 29 November.

In February 1980, three crew members were lost at sea in the Atlantic 50 miles (80 km) northeast of Cape Hatteras during a snowstorm. A fourth crew member was also washed overboard, but was rescued.

She won the 1982 Marjorie Sterrett Battleship Fund Award for the Atlantic Fleet.

King was sold on 15 April 1994, and broken up for scrap by J&L Metals, Wilmington, North Carolina during 1995.
