= USS Thomas S. Gates =

Ticonderoga class cruiser

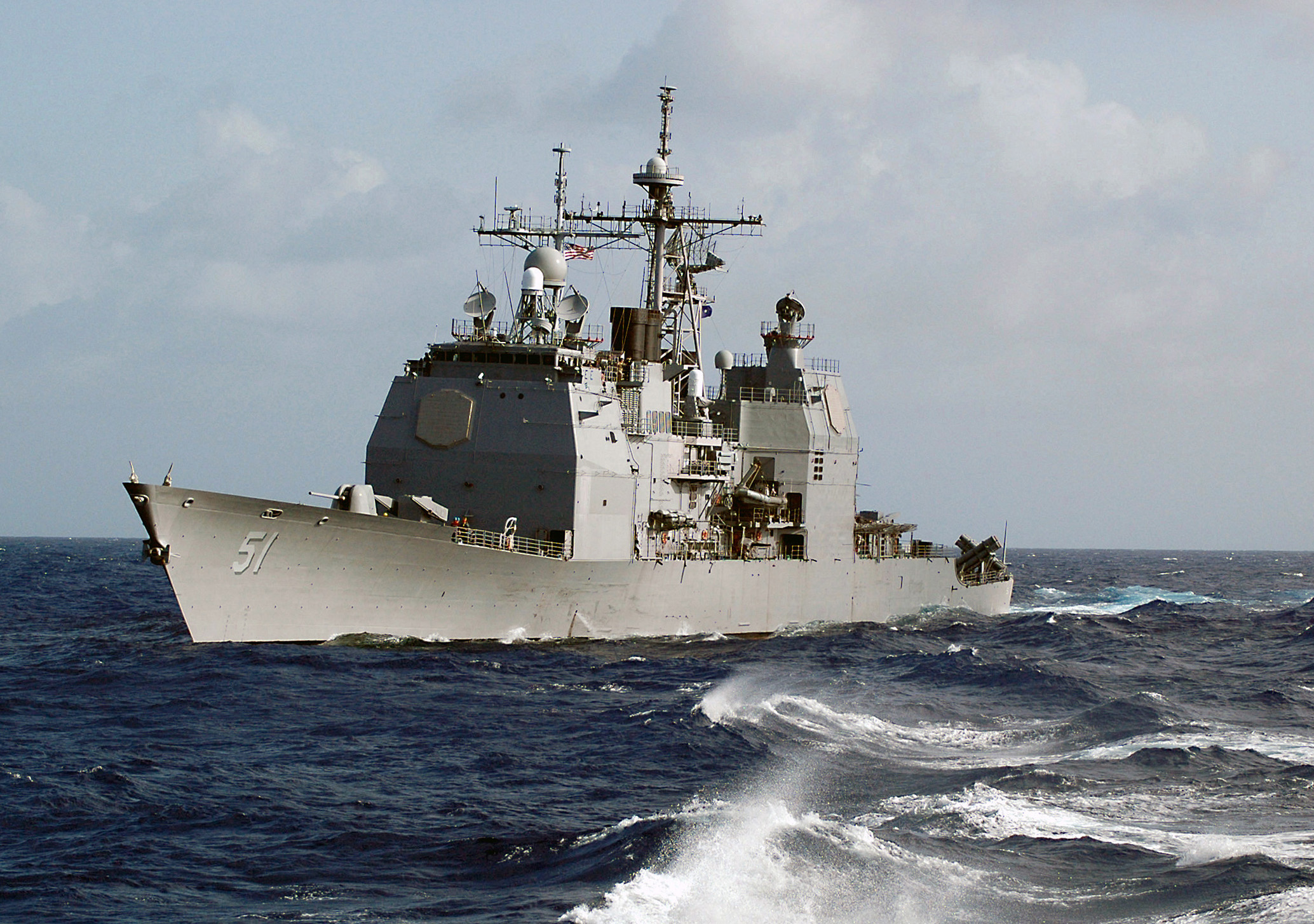
- USS Thomas S. Gates on 18 July 2005

History

United States
- Name: Thomas S. Gates
- Namesake: Thomas S. Gates
- Ordered: 20 May 1982
- Builder: Bath Iron Works
- Laid down: 31 August 1984
- Launched: 14 December 1985
- Sponsored by: Anne Gates
- Acquired: 22 June 1987
- Commissioned: 22 August 1987
- Decommissioned: 16 December 2005
- Stricken: 16 December 2005
- Home port: Norfolk (1987 — 1998); Pascagoula (1998 — 2005)
- Identification: Call sign: NTSG; Hull number: CG-51
- Motto: Defender of the Republic
- Fate: Scrapped, 2017
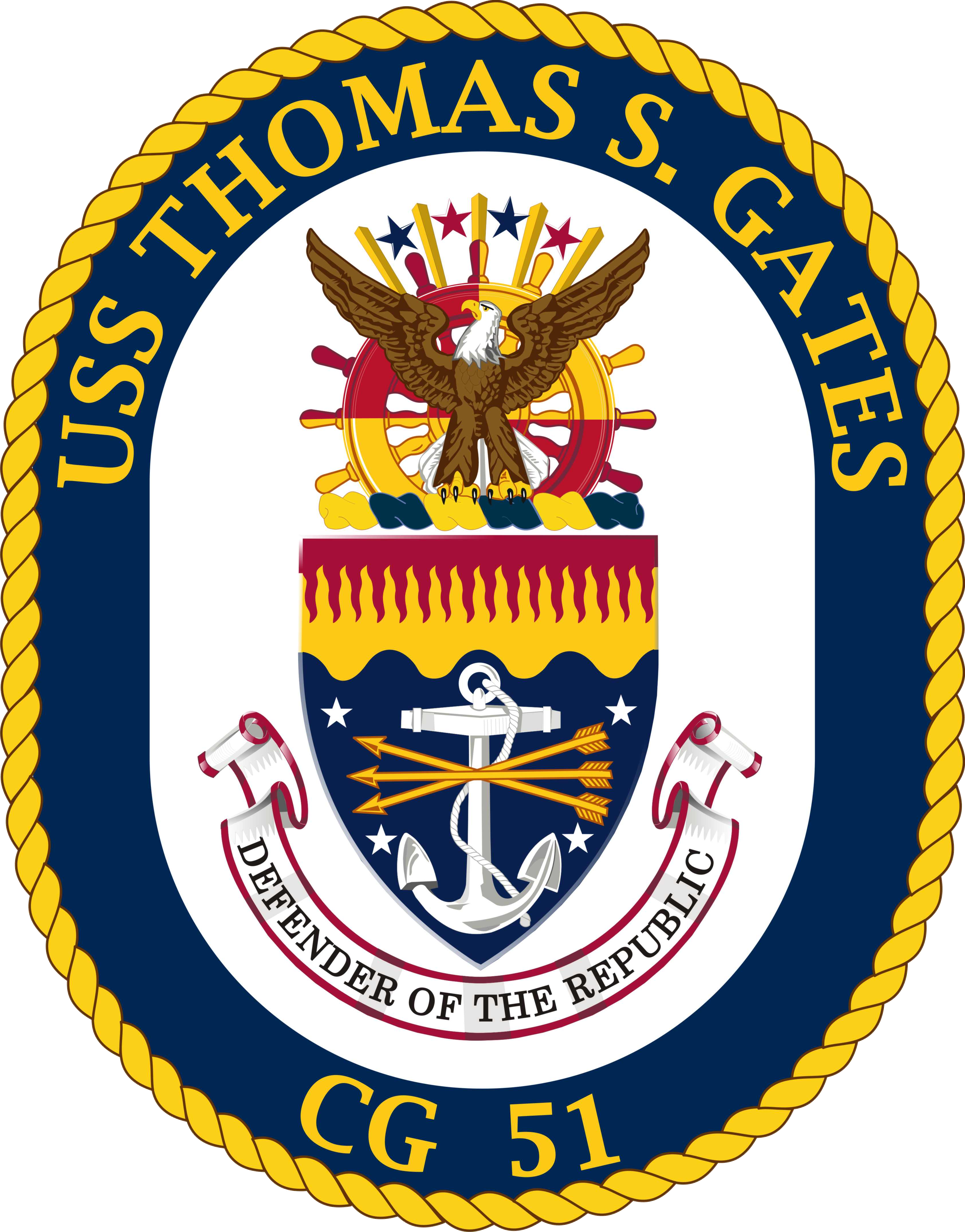
- Badge

General characteristics
- Class & type: Ticonderoga-class cruiser
- Displacement: Approx. 9,600 long tons (9,800 t) full load
- Length: 567 feet (173 m)
- Beam: 55 feet (16.8 meters)
- Draught: 34 feet (10.2 meters)
- Propulsion: 4 × General Electric LM2500 gas turbine engines; 2 × controllable-reversible pitch propellers; 2 × rudders
- Speed: 32.5 knots (60 km/h; 37.4 mph)
- Complement: 30 officers and 300 enlisted
- Sensors & processing systems: AN/SPY-1A/B multi-function radar; AN/SPS-49 air search radar (Removed on some ships); AN/SPG-62 fire control radar; AN/SPS-73 surface search radar; AN/SPQ-9 gun fire control radar; AN/SQQ-89(V)1/3 - A(V)15 Sonar suite, consisting of: AN/SQS-53B/C/D active sonar; AN/SQR-19 TACTAS, AN/SQR-19B ITASS, & MFTA passive sonar; AN/SQQ-28 light airborne multi-purpose system; (Note: No Towed Array Sonar on early Cruisers)
- Armament: 2 × Mk 26 missile launchers; 68 × RIM-66 SM-2; 20 × RUR-5 ASROC; 8 × RGM-84 Harpoon missiles; 2 × 5 in (127 mm)/54 caliber Mark 45 lightweight gun; 2–4 × .50 in (12.7 mm) cal. machine gun; 2 × Phalanx CIWS; 2 × Mk 32 12.75 in (324 mm) triple torpedo tubes
- Aircraft carried: 2 × MH-60R Seahawk LAMPS Mk III helicopters.

USS Thomas S. Gates (CG-51) was a flight-I Ticonderoga-class cruiser that was used by the United States Navy. The warship was named after Thomas S. Gates, Secretary of Defense in the last years of the Eisenhower Administration (1959–1961).

In a break from normal naming conventions for the Ticonderoga-class cruisers, Thomas S. Gates was originally the only vessel of the class to be named after a person; all of the other cruisers are named after notable events in American military history until 2023, when USS Chancellorsville was renamed USS Robert Smalls.

== Construction ==
Thomas S. Gates was laid down 31 August 1984, at Bath Iron Works, Bath, Maine, and sponsored by Anne Gates, widow of the ship's namesake. She was launched on 14 December 1985, purchased on 22 June 1987, and commissioned on 22 August 1987, in Philadelphia, Pennsylvania.

== History ==
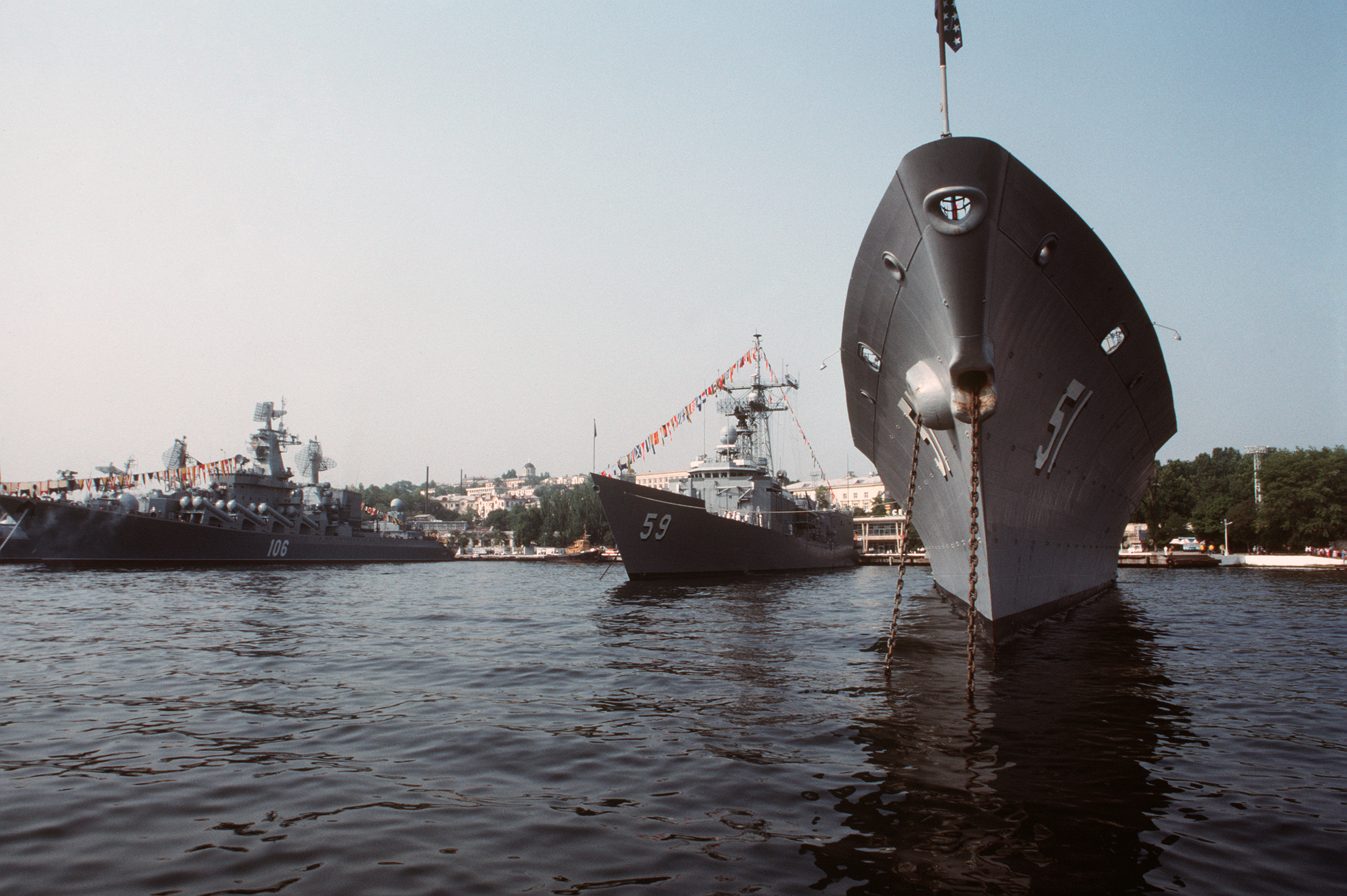
Thomas S. Gates and Kauffman visit Sevastopol, August 1989

This ship's maiden deployment took place from 31 May 1989 to 10 November 1989. After transiting to the Mediterranean Sea as part of the battle group formed around the aircraft carrier Coral Sea, Thomas S. Gates in-chopped to the Sixth Fleet on 10 June 1989; she participated in Operation National Week (10–19 June 1989), conducting turnover with the guided missile cruiser Leyte Gulf at Augusta Bay, Sicily (15 June).

After visiting Palma, Majorca (20–27 June) and Toulon, France (30 June – 15 July), where she underwent an Intermediate Maintenance Availability (IMAV), Thomas S. Gates transited to the eastern Mediterranean (15–21 July); following a port visit to İzmir, Turkey (21–23 July), Thomas S. Gates participated in Exercise Demon Jazz 89 (24–29 July). She then visited Istanbul, Turkey (31 July – 2 August), where she embarked VADM Paul Ilg, Deputy Commander in Chief U.S. Naval Forces, Europe, and then stood into the Black Sea (3–4 August). Accompanied by the guided missile frigate Kauffman, Thomas S. Gates visited Sevastopol, USSR, from 4–8 August, and then returned to Istanbul, where she disembarked VADM Ilg (9–10 August).

Owing to the crisis in Lebanon, which had dictated that the fleet flagship, guided missile cruiser Belknap, not carry out her scheduled visit to Sevastopol, Thomas S. Gates subsequently operated in support of Coral Sea and America battle groups off Beirut.

Returning to Toulon, Thomas S. Gates there underwent a period of maintenance (7–13 September). After taking part in NATO Exercise Display Determination 89 (14 September- 3 October) in concert with units of the French and Turkish Navies, she conducted a period of escort operations (3–11 October) as she transited to the western Mediterranean. She then underwent a period of maintenance in Marseille, France (11–22 October) before she participated in Exercise National Week (24–31 October), during which she conducted turnover with her relief, the cruiser Yorktown at Pollensa Bay, Majorca (29 October). Out-chopping to Commander, 2d Fleet, on 31 October 1989, Thomas S. Gates then conducted her return transit to Norfolk (31 October-10 November 1989).

=== Desert Shield and Desert Storm ===
From 15 August 1990 to 28 March 1991, Thomas S. Gates deployed in support of Desert Shield and Desert Storm.

With only five days of intensive preparations, she deployed as an element of the battle group under RADM Riley D. Mixson, formed around the aircraft carrier John F. Kennedy to participate in Operation Desert Shield. The group exercised at sea from 16–21 August, then began its voyage toward the Mediterranean Sea (22 August), transiting the Strait of Gibraltar on 30 August to become Task Force (TF) 60. On 1 September, the ship experienced a gas turbine casualty while transiting the western Mediterranean that compelled her to put into Augusta Bay, Sicily, for an engine changeout (3–11 September), after which time she rejoined TF-60 (13 September) off Port Said, Egypt.

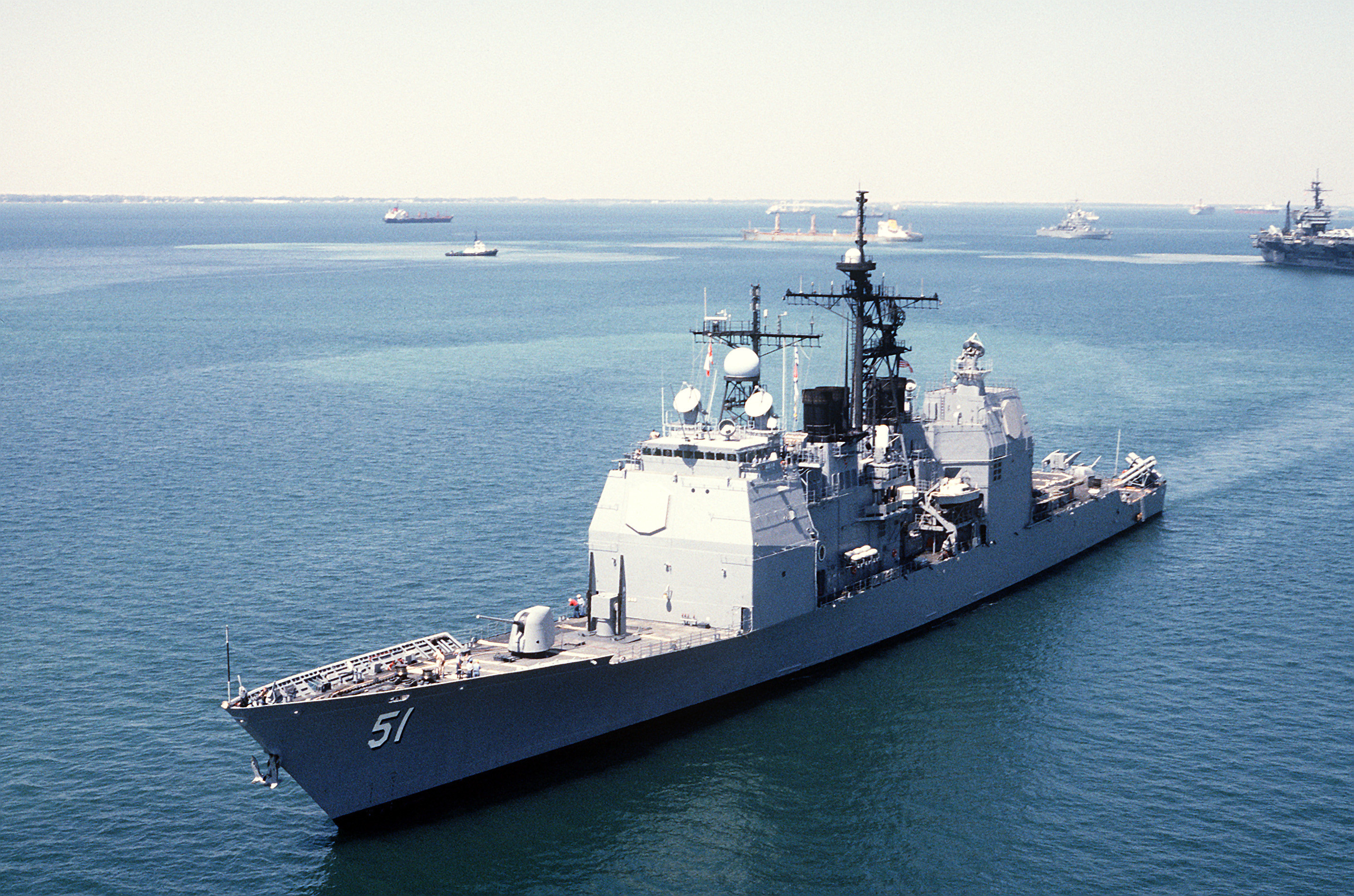
Thomas S. Gates in the Great Bitter Lake, September 1990.

Thomas S. Gates began her maiden transit of the Suez Canal (14 September), leading the battle group on its passage through that historic waterway. Becoming part of Task Group (TG) 150.5 (15 September) upon entering the Red Sea, the guided missile cruiser rode "shotgun" for John F. Kennedy and operated as anti-air warfare commander (16 September – 14 October) before being detached from the carrier on 15 October. With a USCG detachment embarked, Thomas S. Gates transited the Straits of Tiran, at the mouth of the Gulf of Aqaba, and conducted maritime interdiction operations to enforce United Nations-enforced sanctions against the ingress of Iraqi goods (15–19 October); the boarding operations conducted during this time "putting to good use skills developed in February in the Caribbean Sea…"

Thomas S. Gates then visited Hurghada, Egypt (20–23 October 1990), after which time she served as "Gate Guard" in the Gulf of Suez, screening all shipping traffic. TG 150.5 became TF-60 on 26 October, and on the 27th transited the Suez Canal.

Between 28 October and 11 December, Thomas S. Gates operated in the central and eastern Mediterranean, evolutions punctuated by port visits to Naples (31 October – 2 November), İzmir, Turkey (7–13 November), and Haifa, Israel (16–17 November), and an IMAV alongside destroyer tender Yellowstone at Souda Bay, Crete (29 November – 5 December 1990). Transiting the Suez Canal on 9 December, the guided missile cruiser returned to the Red Sea, in-chopping to CTG 150.5 the following day.

Thomas S. Gates then conducted maritime interdiction operations in the Strait of Tiran (10–14 December), completing her 37th boarding of the deployment on the latter date (14 December). Between 15 and 28 December, the ship rode shotgun for John F. Kennedy and served as anti-air warfare commander, participating in three exercises with Royal Air Force units (20, 23, and 26 December) during that time. She put into Jeddah, Saudi Arabia, on 29 December in company with John F. Kennedy, where Vice President Dan Quayle addressed the crews of both ships on New Year's Day 1991. Between 3 and 16 January 1991, Thomas S. Gates conducted Desert Shield operations in the Red Sea, punctuating that period exercising the Royal Saudi Navy in an antisubmarine warfare exercise, Operation Camelot 91 (3–7 January 1991).

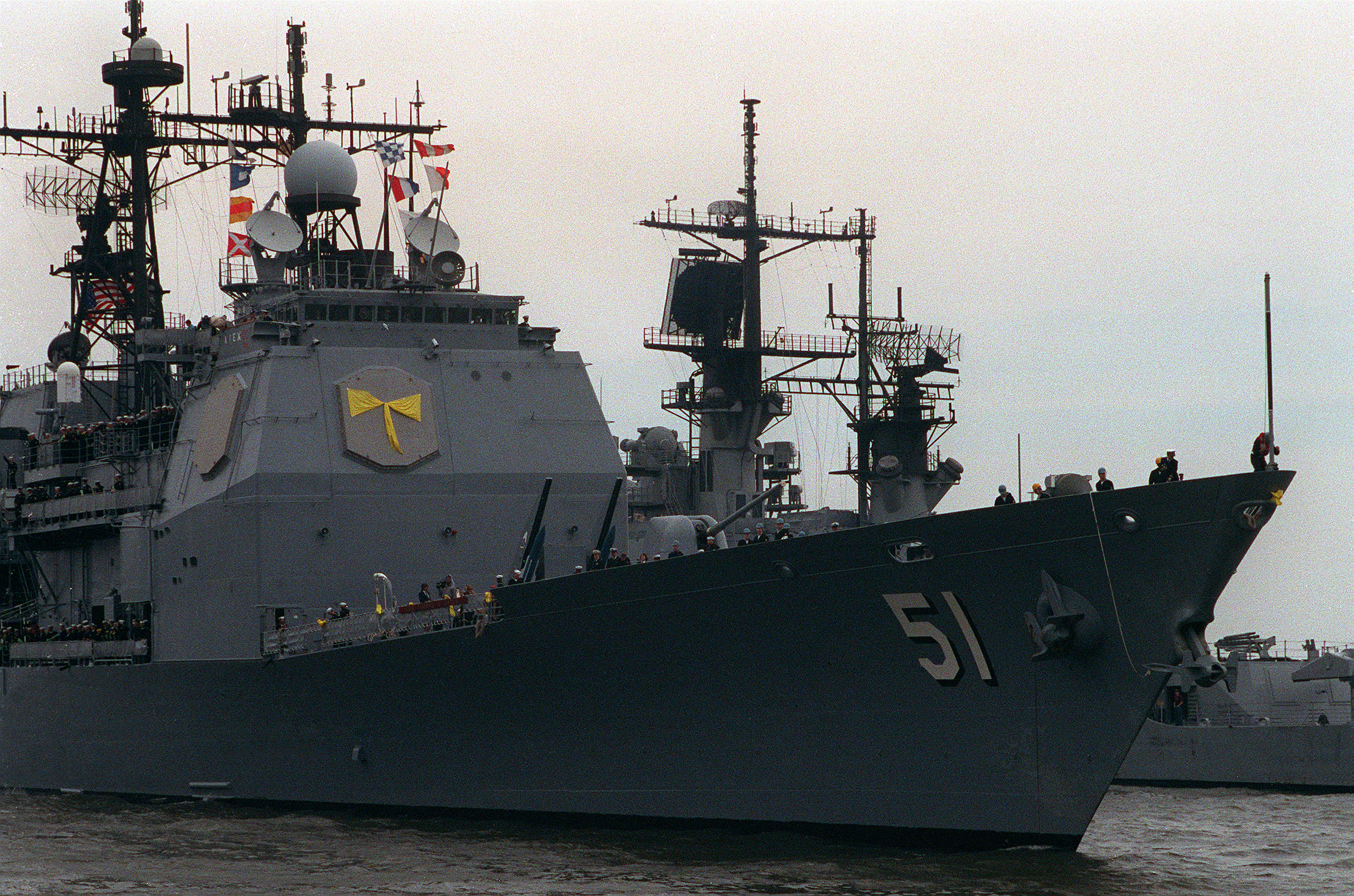
Thomas S. Gates returns to Norfolk following Desert Shield and Desert Storm

Iraq's ignoring the UN-imposed deadline (16 January) for withdrawing from Kuwait changed the complexion of events in the region; however, and Operation Desert Storm soon got underway early the following day (17 January). Over the ensuing weeks (17 January – 13 February), Thomas S. Gates, as Red Crown (Inter Anti-Aircraft Warfare Defense Zone Coordinator) coordinated the departures and returns of air strikes from the aircraft carriers John F. Kennedy, Saratoga and America, "ensuring that all friendly aircraft returned safely through the air defense net while preventing any possible raid-following Iraqi aircraft getting through."

Following a visit to Hurghada (14–18 February), Thomas S. Gates operated once more in the Red Sea (19 February – 1 March), during which time (24 February) the ground war began in Iraq and Kuwait. Following the cease-fire (28 February), the ship conducted a brief period of maritime interdiction operations in the Gulf of Aqaba. Following an in-port period at Jeddah (2–10 March), where she underwent an IMAV alongside the destroyer tender Puget Sound, Thomas S. Gates transited the Suez Canal (12 March). She then conducted anti-submarine warfare exercises in the central Mediterranean (15–17 March), after which she transited the Strait of Gibraltar (18 March), headed for Norfolk, returning to her homeport on 28 March.

=== 1990s after the Gulf War ===
This ship's fourth major deployment was from 6 May to 6 Nov 1992. Thomas S. Gates, with HSL-44 Detachment 9 embarked, deployed (Med 2-92) in company with guided missile cruiser Biddle and destroyer Comte de Grasse on 6 May 1992, and joined the battle group formed around the carrier Saratoga three days later. Transiting the Strait of Gibraltar on 18 May, the guided missile cruiser operated from one end of the Mediterranean to the other for almost two months, pausing at Augusta Bay (23–24 May), Naples (26–30 May), and Gaeta, Italy (4–7 June), participating in Exercise Dasix Lafayette 92-1 (9–11 June), and visiting Ibiza, Spain (13–19 June), a call enlivened by an emergency sortie from her anchorage (14 June) because of heavy seas.

Following her participation in joint-service exercise Eclipse Bravo (21–28 June), Thomas S. Gates then visited Villefranche-sur-Mer, France (30 June – 10 July 1992, during which time she received an IMAV alongside the destroyer tender Yellowstone. She then operated in the Gulf of Lyon (11–12 July), after which she paused at Monaco (13–17 July). The guided missile cruiser participated in ASW exercises in the Strait of Bonifacio (19–20 July), before she was diverted to the Adriatic to serve as anti-air warfare commander for Commander TF 61 in support of Operation Provide Promise (23 July-2 September), monitoring the safety of relief flights into beleaguered Sarajevo. During that time, she took part in missile-firing exercises in the Ionian Sea (27 August).

At the conclusion of those operations, she employed her embarked SH-60B Seahawk helicopters in search and rescue efforts in the wake of the crash of an Italian relief aircraft in the former region of Yugoslavia (3 September). Following a visit to Trieste, Italy (4–13 September), Thomas S. Gates then operated in the Adriatic and Ionian Seas (14–24 September), before pausing briefly for a port visit to Aksaz Karagac, Turkey on 25 September 1992.

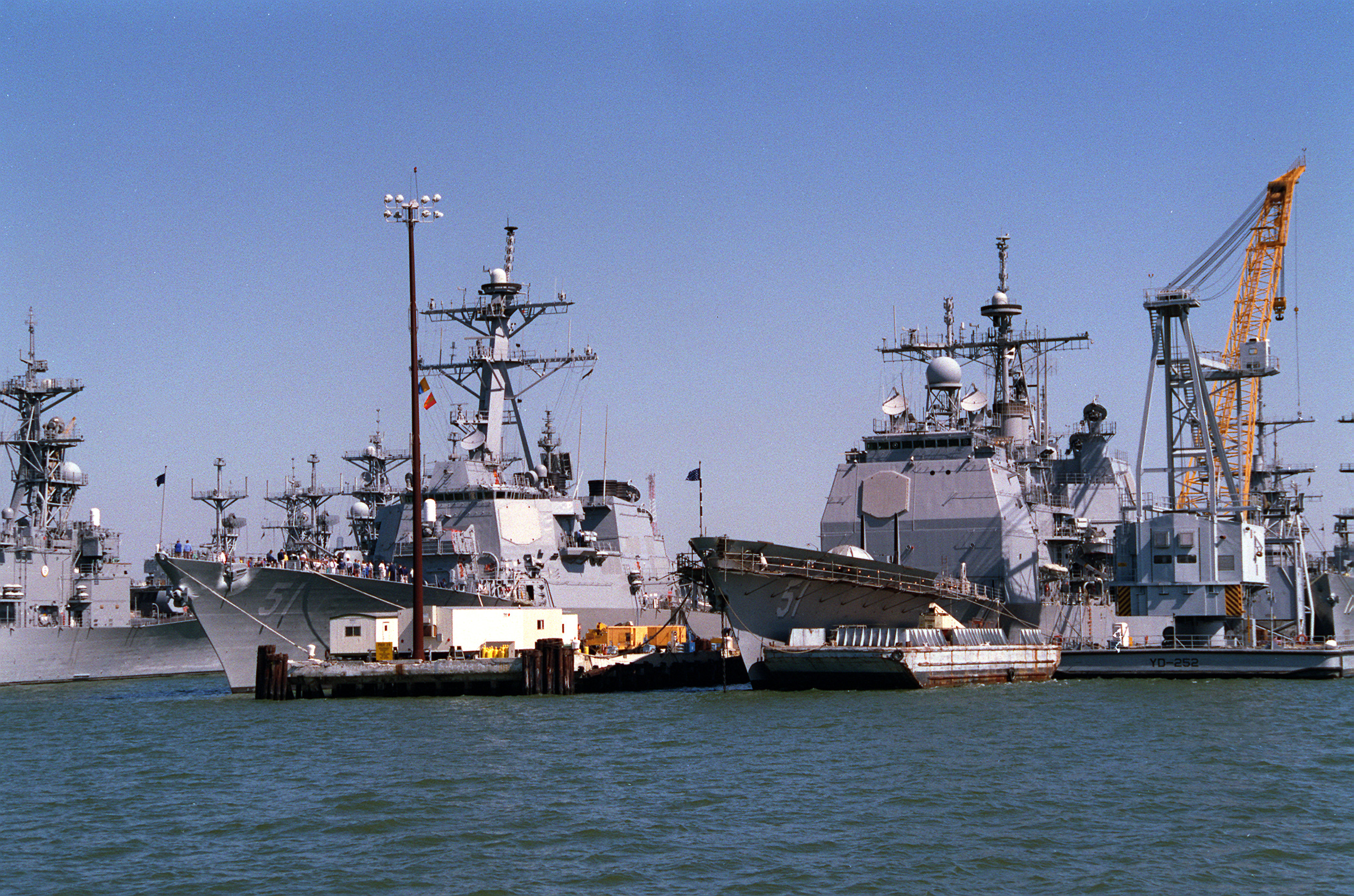
Thomas S. Gates with Arleigh Burke at Norfolk in October 1993.

The guided missile cruiser then took part in a multi-phase NATO exercise, Display Determination 92. The exercise was marred by tragedy when live missiles hit the Turkish destroyer Muavenet, formerly the light minelayer Gwin, on 2 October 1992. Thomas S. Gates provided a damage control boarding team, communications assistance, and directed her fire hoses on the flames on board the Turkish warship from 20 yards away; ten of the guided missile cruiser's crew received decorations for the valor they displayed during the incident. The exercises began anew the next day at the request of the Turkish government.

Thomas S. Gates hosted dignitaries (Lieutenant General Mihov, Bulgarian Chief of Staff, on 4 October, and His Royal Highness Prince Philippe of Belgium on 6 October). Detached from Display Determination 92, the guided missile cruiser proceeded to Naples for a three-day port visit (8–11 October), then participated in Exercise Dasix Lafayette 92-2 (14–15 October), after which time she returned to the Adriatic and Ionian Seas (16–17 October), reprised her visit to Trieste (18–20 October), and operated once more in the Adriatic, turning over her duty as AAW commander to the cruiser Gettysburg in those waters on 22 October, in John F. Kennedy battle group, and then headed for home. Transiting the Strait of Gibraltar on 25 October and detached from the Saratoga battle group on 4 November, Thomas S. Gates stood in to Norfolk on 6 November.

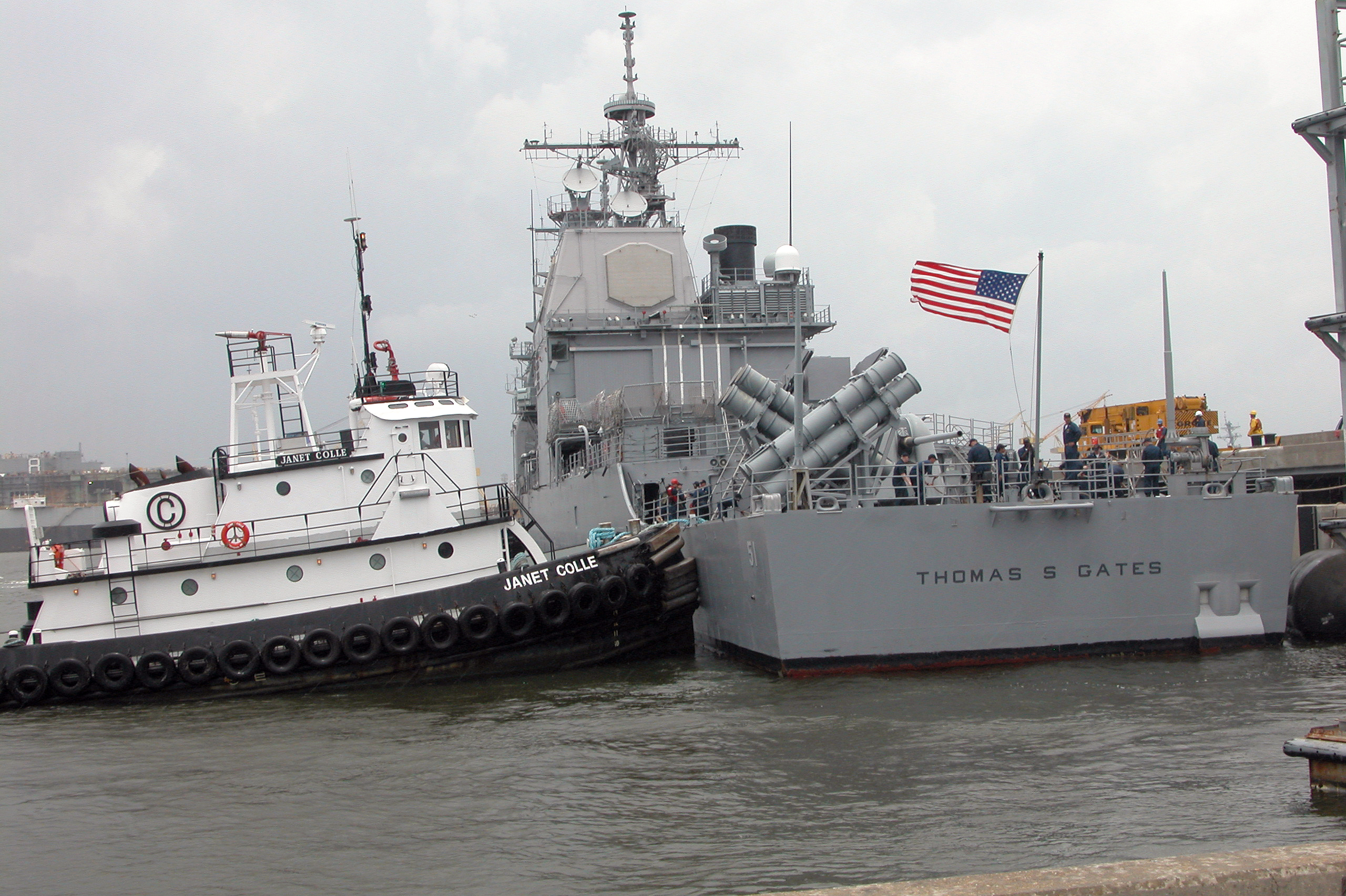
USS Thomas S. Gates gets underway from Naval Station Pascagoula in order to evade approaching Tropical Storm Arlene, 2005. (Note that there is no hole for the Towed Array sonar like later CG-47 cruisers would have)

This ship's sixth major deployment took place from 20 May 1994 to 17 Nov 1994. Underway in company with the George Washington Battle Group, Thomas S. Gates with HSL-44 Detachment 9 (Magnum 453) embarked, sailed to Great Britain to take part in ceremonies for the 50th anniversary of the D-Day landings in Normandy. On 5 June 1994, she anchored off Pointe du Hoc along with a dozen other NATO warships as a backdrop for the ceremonies and put into Le Havre on the 6th to allow veterans to tour the ship.

Underway on 9 June, the cruiser sailed south to the Adriatic Sea (arriving there on the 20th via Gibraltar) for duty as "Red Crown" (AAW defense warship) in support of Operations Sharp Guard, Deny Flight and Provide Promise. An engine failure on the 24th sent the cruiser to Augusta Bay for repairs, where she remained until 5 July 1994. The warship then sailed east to Haifa, Israel, for a port visit (10–12 July) before returning to the Adriatic on the 16th.

After turning over duties on 27 July, the cruiser proceeded to the south of France for festivities celebrating the 50th anniversary of the amphibious landings at Théoule-sur-Mer (10–16 August 1994). Following a short repair period at Naples from 16–23 August 1994, the Thomas S. Gates quickly steamed to the Suez Canal, transited the Red Sea and proceeded on to the Northern Persian Gulf. Once there, she provided AAW coverage for Operation Southern Watch from 27 August to 21 September 1994, the Allied flights over Iraq designed to protect local Shia Arabs from attacks by Saddam Hussein's Baathist regime. Back in the Mediterranean on 29 September 1994, she participated in NATO Exercise Dynamic Guard 94 (2–12 October) and conducted additional "Red Crown" ops in the Adriatic (17–31 October) before sailing for home, arriving in Norfolk on 17 November 1994.

This ship's ninth major deployment took place from 29 April 1997 to 27 October 1997. Departing Norfolk on 29 April 1997, with HSL-48, Detachment 1 (Venom 500) embarked, the guided missile cruiser sailed across the Atlantic and in-chopped to the 6th Fleet on 11 May, the same day she relieved guided missile destroyer Ramage as anti-air warfare commander. Following the week-long Exercise Linked Seas (11–18 May), she pulled into Palma de Mallorca, Spain, for a five-day port visit. Underway 26 May, the cruiser sailed to Barcelona, arriving there 3 June after conducting a burial at sea with the remains of three World War II veterans. The warship then shifted north on 9 June, arriving at Cannes, France, on 16 June after flying off Venom 500 on the 13 June to participate in the Paris Air Show.

Thomas S. Gates then sailed to La Maddalena, Italy, for a short maintenance period (24–29 June) alongside submarine tender Simon Lake. Following Exercise INVITEX 97 (30 June – 18 July) in the Tyrrhenean Sea, and a short visit to Naples (18–25 July), the cruiser steamed east for a diplomatic visit to Constanța, Romania, arriving there via Corfu, Greece, on 11 August. The cruiser hosted a press conference on 14 August, as well as a reception for over 200 guests—including Rear Admiral Traian Atanasiu, Romanian Chief of the General Staff—before getting underway for joint Exercise Rescue Eagle 97 (17–18 August 1997) in the Black Sea.

The warship then sailed west, arriving in Rota, Spain, on 7 September after stops in Istanbul, Turkey and Livorno, Italy. The cruiser then participated in joint Exercise Strong Tarpon (14–21 September) in the eastern Atlantic before conducting return port visits to Palma de Mallorca, Barcelona and Cannes. After Thomas S. Gates put into Gibraltar on 10 October, she turned over with guided missile cruiser South Carolina on 16 October before sailing to Bermuda, arriving there 25 October 1997. That same day, just after embarking crew relatives for a Tiger cruise home, the cruiser responded to a distress call, recovering two crewmen from the drifting sailboat Glou Glou. Thomas S. Gates arrived home at Norfolk on 27 October 1997.

On 25 September 1999, Thomas S. Gates responded to a call for assistance from the United States Coast Guard vessel Resolute, then in the process of conducting boarding operations of the suspect merchant vessel Love. After an attempt by Love's crew to scuttle their ship, the cruiser sent a damage control team to try to keep the merchant vessel seaworthy, but those efforts failed after repeated attempts to stop the flooding. The cruiser then sank the awash vessel with 5-inch gunfire as it was as a hazard to navigation.

=== 2000s ===
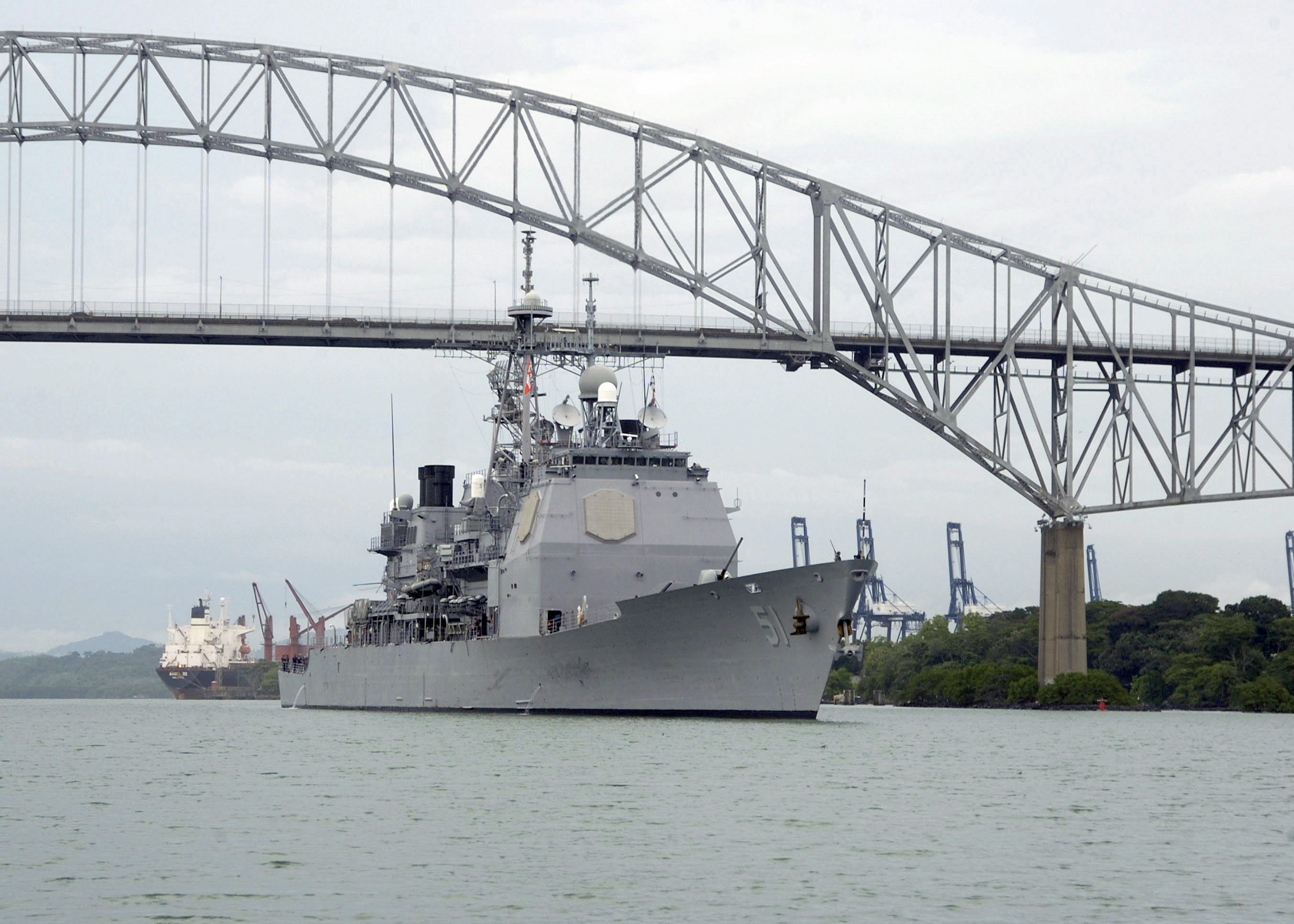
Thomas S. Gates sails under the Bridge of the Americas, August 2005.

Thomas S. Gates departed Pascagoula on 3 June 2002, with HSL 42, Detachment 9 (Proud Warrior) embarked, transited the Panama Canal on 7 June 2002 to conduct counter-drug ops in the eastern Pacific. During a three-month deployment, the cruiser conducted six patrols out of Rodman, Panama, during which she made two major drug seizures (4.5 tons of cocaine) from "Go-Fast" speedboats off El Salvador. The warship also conducted a special forces exercise called Trident Warrior and a submarine tracking and gunnery exercise with the Peruvian Navy.

In March 2003, Thomas S. Gates was homeported at Pascagoula and was assigned to Destroyer Squadron 6.

On 21 March 2004, Thomas S. Gates rendezvoused with cruise ship Celebrity Summit, of Royal Caribbean International Cruise Lines, in the central Caribbean. The cruiser's embarked USCG Enforcement Detachment boarding team, with the cooperation of the cruise ship's captain and security force, apprehended Jose Miguel Battle, Jr. the suspected leader of The Corporation, an organized crime outfit. Thomas S. Gates also provided an escort for the aircraft carrier Ronald Reagan through the Strait of Magellan. Due to poor weather in the Pacific, Thomas S. Gates exited the strait via the Smyth Channel and conducted a 36-hour transit through restricted maneuvering waters. Thomas S. Gates was the first Ticonderoga-class cruiser to make that transit. The cruiser returned to home port on 2 August 2004.

== Fate ==
Due to Hurricane Katrina, her last deployment was cut short. The crew was given leave to take care of their families and other personal business. The Navy decommissioned Thomas S. Gates on 15 December 2005, four months earlier than the planned March 2006 date, and after serving only 18 years in the active fleet. She was stricken the same date and was berthed at the Naval Inactive Ship Maintenance Facility in Philadelphia, PA as of 2014. As of 2008, she was slated to be dismantled in the next five years along with her sisters Vincennes and Yorktown. As of July 2014, NAVSEA planned to place ex-Thomas S. Gates and ex-Ticonderoga up for bid to scrappers via the Defense Logistics Agency (DLA). DLA awarded a contract to scrap ex-Thomas S. Gates to ESCO Marine, 15 December 2014. She was towed to New Orleans, LA., for scrapping in July 2017.

The Naval Vessel Register lists the ships decommissioning and strike date as 16 December 2006. DANFS lists the decommissioning date as 15 December 2005. There is also a pamphlet entitled "USS Thomas S. Gates (CG 51) decommissioning ceremony, 14 December 2005 Naval Station Mayport" OCLC 156786375 listed on Worldcat. The Times-Union of Jacksonville, Florida noted that "USS Gates" (sic) was to decommission today, 14 December 2005.

== Awards ==
- 1 Joint Meritorious Unit Award
- 1 Navy Unit Commendation
- 1 Meritorious Unit Commendation (as part of the USS George Washington (CVN-73) Battle Group)
- 2 Battle Efficiency (Navy E) Ribbons
- 2 National Defense Service Medal
- 1 Humanitarian Service Medal (as part of Navy Construction Battalion Center Gulfport 20th Naval Construction Regiment )
- 1 Southwest Asia Service Medal
- 6 Armed Forces Service Medals
- Sea Service Deployment Ribbon (multiple awards)
- 2 Coast Guard Special Operations Service Ribbons
- 2 Secretary of the Navy Letters of Commendation

== Ship insignia ==
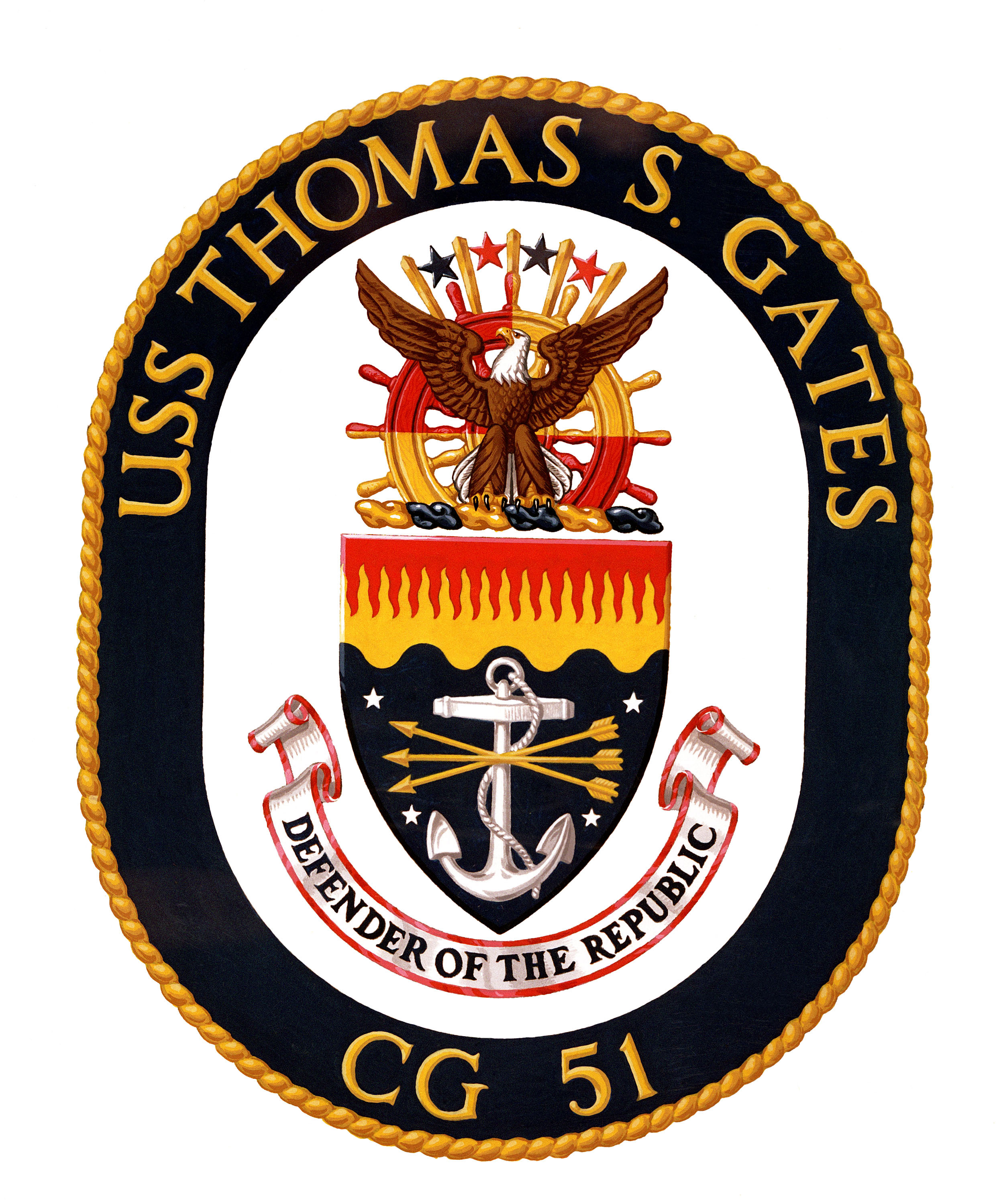
USS Thomas S. Gates (CG-51) coat of arms

Thomas S. Gates's insignia reflects the government service of the man honored in the name of the ship. The upper section of the crest represents Gates's World War II service in various aircraft carriers (large, small, and escort); the deep blue represents the Pacific Ocean; the gold U.S. Navy tradition. The heraldic rayonne division of scarlet and gold symbolizes the severity of Japanese kamikaze attacks that descended upon aircraft carriers during the Lingayen, Iwo Jima, and Okinawa campaigns, in which Gates participated. The anchor and stars, adapted from the Secretary of the Navy's flag, refer to Gates's tenure as Undersecretary of the Navy and Secretary of the Navy. The three arrows, which appear on the flag of the Secretary of Defense, reflect his tours as Deputy Undersecretary of Defense and Secretary of Defense.

On the crest, the eagle, symbolic of power and authority, along with the ship's wheel, allude to the strong leadership provided by Gates during a period of technological change (guns to missiles, conventional to nuclear power, piston engines to jets, and the beginning of space exploration) while at the helm of the Defense Department. The alternating colors of the wheel symbolize that era of change. The blue stars represent the United States, the red, China; the gold rays from the Presidential seal emphasize the significance of Gates's appointment, by President Gerald R. Ford, to head the U.S. Liaison Office to the People's Republic of China, and reflect Gates's contributions to the United States in that role, his last as a public servant.
