= TCG Muavenet =

TCG Mauvenet may refer to one of the following ships of the Turkish Navy:

- Ottoman destroyer Muâvenet-i Millîye, a destroyer of the Ottoman Navy that entered service in 1910; transferred to the Turkish Navy upon that navy's creation; taken out of service in 1923; scrapped, 1953
- TCG Muavenet (1941), a Demirhisar-class destroyer ordered from the United Kingdom just prior to World War II; after the outbreak of that war, ship was purchased by the Royal Navy and renamed HMS Inconstant; transferred to the Turkish Navy in 1946 with name restored to Mauvenet
- TCG Muavenet (DM 357), the former American Robert H. Smith-class destroyer minelayer USS Gwin, transferred to the Turkish Navy in 1971; struck by two missiles fired from USS Saratoga during an exercise in Saros Bay, Turkey, in 1992; scrapped, 1993
- TCG Muavenet (F-250), the former American Knox-class frigate USS Capodanno; given to Turkey by the United States Navy as restitution for wrecking the previous Muavenet
