= Akar-class replenishment oiler =

Replenishment oiler ship

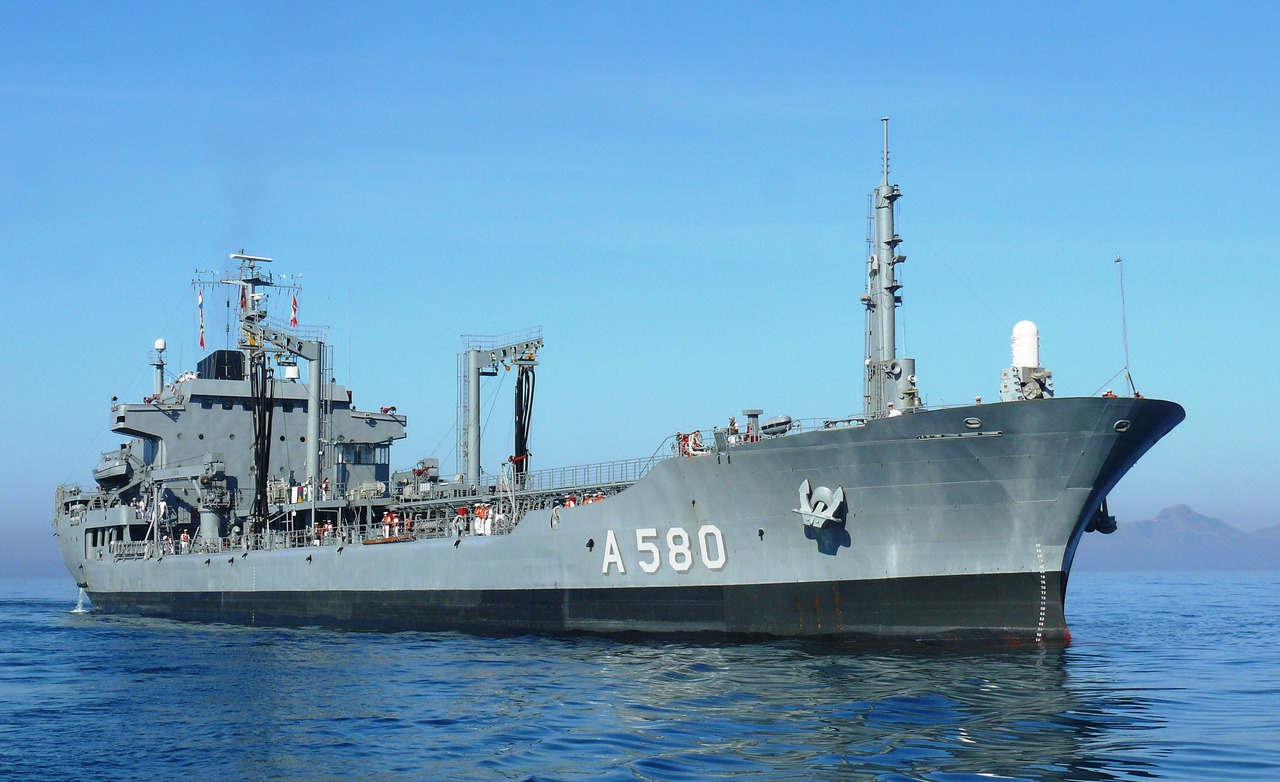
- TCG Akar at Cartagena on 31 May 2010

Class overview
- Name: Akar
- Operators: Turkish Navy
- Built: 1987–1995
- Completed: 2
- Active: 2

General characteristics for Yarbay Kudret Güngör
- Type: Replenishment oiler
- Displacement: 19,350 t (19,040 long tons) (full load)
- Length: 145.1 m (476 ft 1 in)
- Beam: 22.8 m (74 ft 10 in)
- Draught: 8.4 m (27 ft 7 in)
- Propulsion: 4,847 kW (6,500 hp) diesel engine, one shaft.
- Speed: 16 knots (30 km/h; 18 mph)
- Range: 6,000 nmi (11,000 km; 6,900 mi) at 14 knots (26 km/h; 16 mph)
- Complement: 203
- Sensors & processing systems: AN/SPG-34 fire-control radar
- Armament: 2 Bofors 40 mm L/70 guns; 1 Mk 15 Phalanx CIWS
- Aviation facilities: Aft helicopter pad

The Akar class is a series of two replenishment oilers and fleet support ships, designed and built for service in the Turkish Navy. The lead ship of the class, TCG Akar, was constructed in 1982–1983 and entered service in 1987. The second ship, TCG Yarbay Kudret Güngör, was constructed in 1993–1994 and entered service in 1995. Both ships were constructed in Turkey, though Yarbay Kudret Güngör was the first ship built for the Turkish Navy by a private shipyard. Both vessels remain in service.

== Description ==
The Akar class is designed for underway replenishment of Turkish Navy vessels and are rated as replenishment oilers and fleet support ships. The vessels have a fully loaded displacement of 19,350 tonnes (19,040 long tons) and measure 15,000 tons deadweight (DWT). They are 145.1 metres (476 ft 1 in) long with a beam of 22.8 m (74 ft 10 in) and a draught of 8.4 m (27 ft 7 in). The Akar class are powered by a diesel engine driving one shaft rated at 4,847 kilowatts (6,500 hp). This gives the oilers a maximum speed of 16 knots (30 km/h; 18 mph) and a range of 6,000 nautical miles (11,000 km; 6,900 mi) at 14 knots (26 km/h; 16 mph). (Note: The Turkish Navy's website states that the vessels have a maximum speed of 15 knots (28 km/h; 17 mph).)

The two vessels, Akar and Yarbay Kudret Güngör have different capacities. Akar has capacity for 16,000 t (16,000 long tons; 18,000 short tons) of oil fuel. Yarbay Kudret Güngör has capacity for 9,980 t (9,820 long tons) of oil fuel, 2,700 t (2,700 long tons) of water, 80 t (79 long tons) of hub oil and 500 m^{3} (18,000 cu ft) of stores. The vessels have a helicopter pad over the stern capable of landing medium helicopters. The two vessels also differ in armament. Akar has twin-mounted 76 mm (3 in)/50 calibre guns and twin-mounted Bofors 40 mm (1.6 in)/70 guns. Yarbay Kudret Güngör mounts a 20 mm (0.8 in) Mk 15 Phalanx CIWS and twin Bofors 40 mm guns. For the 76 mm guns, Akar is equipped Mk 63 fire-control system while Yarbay Kudret Güngör mounts SPG-34 fire-control radar. The vessels have a complement of 203 including 14 officers.

== List of ships ==
Hull number	Ship	Builder	Laid down	Launched	Commissioned	Status
A-580	Akar	Gölcük Naval Shipyard, Kocaeli	5 August 1982	17 November 1983	9 September 1987	In service
A-595	Yarbay Kudret Güngör	Sedef Shipyard, Istanbul	5 November 1993	15 November 1994	24 October 1995	In service

== Construction and career ==
The two ships of the Akar class were constructed in different decades. Akar was named for Akar, and Yarbay Kudret Güngör for the commander of TCG Muavenet who died during a naval exercise in 1992. Akar was laid down in 1982 at Gölcük Naval Shipyard, Kocaeli, Turkey. The vessel was launched in 1983 and commissioned in 1987. Yarbay Kudret Güngör was laid down in 1993 by Sedef Shipyard at Istanbul, Turkey, launched in 1994 and commissioned in 1995. Yarbay Kudret Güngör was the first Turkish naval ship to be constructed by a private shipyard. Akar is primarily used as an oiler while Yarbay Kudret Güngör is used as a logistic support ship.

== See also ==
- List of Turkish Navy ships
