= USS Capodanno =

US Navy Knox-class frigate

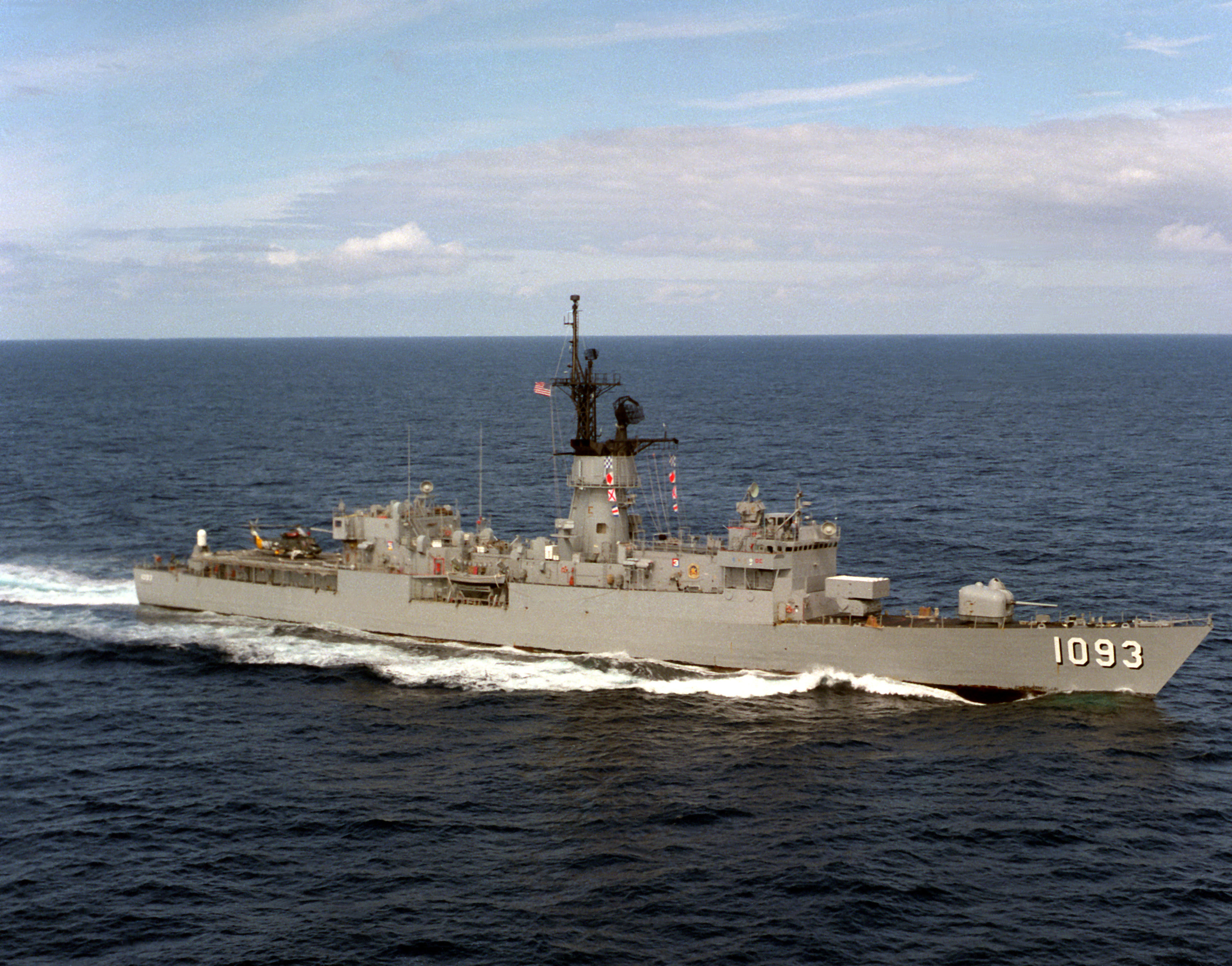
- USS Capodanno (FF-1093)

History

United States
- Name: Capodanno
- Namesake: Vincent R. Capodanno
- Ordered: 25 August 1966
- Builder: Avondale Shipyard, Westwego, Louisiana
- Laid down: 12 October 1971
- Launched: 21 October 1972
- Acquired: 18 October 1973
- Commissioned: 17 November 1973
- Decommissioned: 30 July 1993
- Stricken: 11 January 1995
- Home port: Newport R.I (Pier2)
- Identification: FF-1093
- Motto: Duty with Honor
- Nickname(s): Happy Cappy
- Fate: Leased and then sold to Turkey

Turkey
- Name: Muavenet
- Acquired: 1993
- Commissioned: 1993
- Decommissioned: 2012
- Identification: F-250

General characteristics
- Class & type: Knox-class frigate
- Displacement: 3,020 long tons (3,070 t) (standard); 4,065 long tons (4,130 t) (full load)
- Length: 438 ft (134 m)
- Beam: 46.9 feet (14.3 m)
- Draft: 24 ft 9 in (7.54 m)
- Installed power: 2 × CE 1200psi boilers; 35,000 shp (26,000 kW)
- Propulsion: 1 Westinghouse geared turbine; 1 shaft
- Speed: over 27 kn (50 km/h; 31 mph)
- Complement: 18 officers, 267 enlisted
- Sensors & processing systems: AN/SPS-40 Air Search Radar; AN/SPS-67 Surface Search Radar; AN/SQS-26 Sonar; AN/SQR-18 Towed array sonar system; Mk68 Gun Fire Control System
- Electronic warfare & decoys: AN/SLQ-32 Electronics Warfare System
- Armament: As built: 1 × 5 in (127 mm)/54 caliber Mark 42 gun; 1 × Mk-16 8–cell ASROC launcher; 2 × dual Mark 32 Mark 46 torpedo launchers; First refit: 1 × Mk-25 8–cell RIM-7 Sea Sparrow (BPDMS) (DE-1052–1069 and 1071–1083); 1 × Mk-29 8–cell RIM-7H Improved Sea Sparrow (IBPDMS) (DE-1070); Mk-16 2 cells converted to launch HARPOON; Second refit: 1 × Phalanx CIWS (RIM-7/7H Sea Sparrow removed)
- Aircraft carried: one SH-2 Seasprite (LAMPS I) helicopter
- Aviation facilities: 1 × Hangar

USS Capodanno (FF-1093) was the 42nd Knox-class frigate in the United States Navy. It was named after Fr. Vincent Capodanno, recipient of the Medal of Honor.

== Design and description ==
The Knox class design was derived from the Brooke-class frigate modified to extend range and without a long-range missile system. The ships had an overall length of 438 feet (133.5 m), a beam of 47 feet (14.3 m) and a draft of 25 feet (7.6 m). They displaced 4,066 long tons (4,131 t) at full load. Their crew consisted of 13 officers and 211 enlisted men.

The ships were equipped with one Westinghouse geared steam turbine that drove the single propeller shaft. The turbine was designed to produce 35,000 shaft horsepower (26,000 kW), using steam provided by 2 C-E boilers, to reach the designed speed of 27 knots (50 km/h; 31 mph). The Knox class had a range of 4,500 nautical miles (8,300 km; 5,200 mi) at a speed of 20 knots (37 km/h; 23 mph).

The Knox-class ships were armed with a 5"/54 caliber Mark 42 gun forward and a single 3-inch/50-caliber gun aft. They mounted an eight-round RUR-5 ASROC launcher between the 5-inch (130 mm) gun and the bridge. Close-range anti-submarine defense was provided by two twin 12.75-inch (324 mm) Mk 32 torpedo tubes. The ships were equipped with a torpedo-carrying DASH drone helicopter; its telescoping hangar and landing pad were positioned amidships aft of the mack. Beginning in the 1970s, the DASH was replaced by a SH-2 Seasprite LAMPS I helicopter and the hangar and landing deck were accordingly enlarged. Most ships also had the 3-inch (76 mm) gun replaced by an eight-cell BPDMS missile launcher in the early 1970s.

== Construction and career ==
Since breaking her commissioning pennant on 17 November 1973, Capodanno continued to gain new honors in memory of her name sake, Lieutenant Vincent R. Capodanno, CHC, USN. On her first Mediterranean Sea deployment, she conducted search and rescue operations on four occasions resulting in the saving of 22 lives. Subsequent deployments were to the Middle East Force in 1976 and to South America in 1977.

Capodanno had her first extensive overhaul in 1978 in Bath, Maine. Following this overhaul she was assigned to Commander, Naval Surface Group FOUR with Newport, RI as her homeport. In 1979 she again deployed to the Mediterranean Sea and won the Battle Efficiency "E". In 1980 she participated in TEAMWORK "80" a major NATO Exercise and won another Battle "E". In 1981, the ship participated in her second UNTTAS deployment to South America.

In November 1982, Capodanno started her third Mediterranean deployment. She participated as a Naval Gunfire Support Ship in support of the Multi National Peace Keeping Force in Lebanon and earned the Navy Expeditionary Medal. Returning from this deployment she again had a major overhaul and modernization at the Bath Iron Works. In 1983, CAPODANNO earned her third Battle "E". 1984 saw the completion of overhaul and Refresher Training at Guantanamo Bay, Cuba.

In October 1985, Capodanno deployed on a Mediterranean/Indian Ocean deployment. This deployment included strike operations against Libya as part of the CORAL SEA Coral Sea Battle Group for which the ship was awarded the Navy Unit Commendation.

Returning in May 1986, Capodanno completed a short overhaul in Boston MA and completed Refresher Training in Cuba in March 1987. The remainder of 1987 was spent in Naval Gunfire Support and ASW Training. In September 1987, Capodanno participated in Ocean Safari 87 a Major NATO exercise in the Norwegian Sea and Fjords. On 29 February 1988, Capodanno started her fifth Mediterranean Sea deployment as an ASW line ship.

== Turkish service ==
USS Capodanno was given to Turkey by the United States Navy as part of the restitution for the accident on TCG Muavenet (DM 357) in 1992. Decommissioned on 30 July 1993, Capodanno was subsequently leased to Turkey where she was recommissioned as TCG Muavenet (F-250). Stricken from the Navy list on 11 January 1995, Capodanno was finally sold to Turkey on 22 February 2002. The ship was removed from active service in 2012.

== Notes ==
Decommissioning Naval Captain Mark Fischer
