= TCG Muavenet (DM 357) =

Turkish Navy destroyer minelayer

History

Turkey
- Name: TCG Muavenet
- Launched: see USS Gwin
- Acquired: 15 August 1971
- Stricken: 1993
- Identification: DM 357
- Fate: Crippled by Sea Sparrow missiles fired from USS Saratoga on 2 October 1992; broken up for scrap 1993

General characteristics
- Displacement: 2,200 tons
- Length: 376 ft 5 in (114.73 m)
- Beam: 14 ft (4.3 m)
- Draft: 15 ft 8 in (4.78 m)
- Speed: 34 knots (63 km/h; 39 mph)
- Armament: 6 x 5 in (127 mm)/38 cal. guns; 8 × 20 mm Oerlikon cannons; 4 cp., 2 dct.

TCG Muavenet (DM-357) (previously USS Gwin, transferred in 1971) was a destroyer minelayer of the Turkish Navy crippled by two Sea Sparrow missiles fired from the aircraft carrier USS Saratoga during a NATO exercise in Saros Bay, Turkey in 1992, resulting in five deaths and 22 injured among its crew.

== Sea Sparrow incident ==
During the autumn of 1992, the United States, Turkey, and several other NATO members participated in "Exercise Display Determination 1992", a combined forces naval exercise under the overall command of Admiral Jeremy Michael Boorda of the United States Navy. The forces of participating nations were assigned to either of two multinational teams. Vice Admiral T. Joseph Lopez of the United States Navy led the "Brown Forces," which included Saratoga. The opposing "Green Forces," including Muavenet were under the direct control of Admiral Kroon of the Netherlands.

During the "enhanced tactical" phase of the training exercises, the Brown Forces were to attempt an amphibious landing at Saros Bay in the Aegean Sea against the resistance offered by the Green Forces. Admiral Boorda ordered the units comprising each force to actively seek and "destroy" each other. Both task force commanders had full authority to engage the simulated enemy when and where they deemed appropriate and to use all warfare assets at their disposal to achieve victory.

During an exercise planning session on 1 October 1992, the battle group commander, Rear Admiral Philip Dur, ordered that a simulated attack on nearby opposition forces use Standard Missiles and Harpoon missiles. Sea Sparrow missiles aboard the USS Saratoga, an anti-aircraft defensive system, was not part of existing doctrine for fighting surface targets and had not been used before, either in exercises or in live combat operations against surface targets. The order to exercise simulated Sea Sparrow missiles was issued by the carrier's operations staff with the concurrence of the Admiral, who assumed these simulated engagements were to provide training to Saratoga watch standers. Saratoga's missiles were not required to engage opposition forces. The battle group commander's staff assumed that Sea Sparrow missile system would be "simulated" (meaning the missile stations would be unmanned). Just prior to midnight on 2 October 1992, when the exercise was scheduled to begin, Rear Admiral Dur ordered the USS Thomas S Gate (CG-51) to simulate engagement of Muavenet and other “hostile” ships with her missiles. Admiral Dur did not order Saratoga to conduct any simulated attacks. (see statement of Admiral Boorda (CINCSOUTH) of 1 December 1992). Without providing prior notice of the exercise, officers on Saratoga woke the enlisted Sea Sparrow missile team and directed them to conduct the simulated attack. According to U.S. Navy, certain members of the missile firing team were not told that the exercise was a simulation drill, rather than an actual firing event.

As the drill progressed, the missile system operator used language to indicate he was preparing to fire a live missile, but due to the absence of standard terminology, the supervisors failed to appreciate the significance of the terms used and the requests made. Specifically, the target acquisition system operator issued the command "arm and tune", terminology the console operators understood to require arming of the missiles in preparation for actual firing. The officers supervising the drill did not realize that "arm and tune" signified a live firing and ignored two separate requests from the missile system operator to clarify whether the launch order was an exercise. As a result, shortly after midnight on the morning of 2 October, Saratoga fired two Sea Sparrow missiles at Muavenet. The first missile struck in the bridge, destroying it and the combat information center. The second missile struck in the aft magazine but did not detonate. The explosion and resulting fires killed five of the ship's officers and injured 22. Nearby US Navy ships responded in aid to the Turkish ship, which was now without leadership. Fire and rescue teams boarded the ship and put out the fires in the bridge and the aft magazine, preventing any secondary explosions.

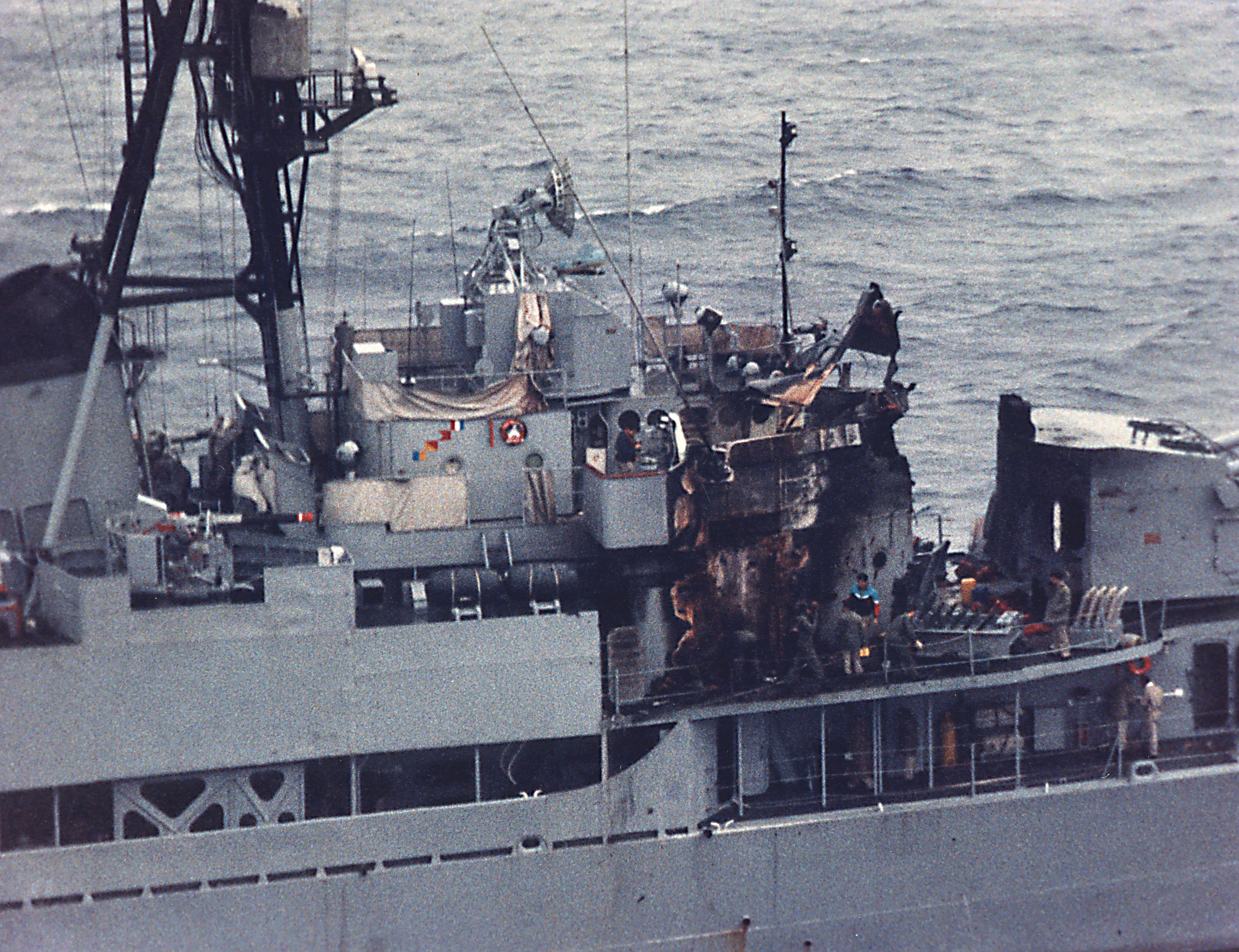
The Turkish navy destroyer TCG Muavenet (DM 357) shortly after being crippled by two Sea Sparrow missiles fired accidentally from the USS Saratoga CV-60 on October 2, 1992, in the Aegean Sea

The sailors who actually fired the missiles were not punished, but the ship's commanding officer, Captain James M. Drager, four officers and three enlisted men received admiral's non-judicial punishment, an action which effectively ended their US Navy careers.

USS Capodanno was given to Turkey by the United States Navy as part of the restitution for the accident, and the vessel was renamed TCG Muavenet (F-250).

== Lawsuit ==
On 29 September 1994, some of the Turkish Navy sailors serving aboard Muavenet instituted legal action against the United States government. The action encompassed two wrongful death claims and 299 personal injury claims. On 20 February 1997, the U.S. Court of Appeals affirmed a lower court ruling against them. Their conclusion was that:

This case presents a nonjusticiable political question because it would require a court to interject itself into military decision making and foreign policy, areas the Constitution has committed to coordinate branches of government.
