= USS Gwin (DM-33) =

Robert H. Smith-class destroyer minelayer

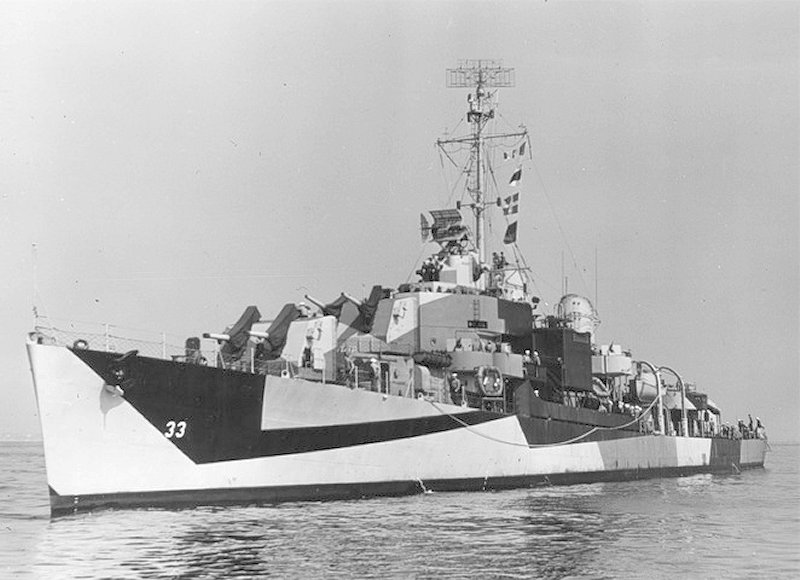

History

United States
- Name: Gwin
- Namesake: William Gwin
- Builder: Bethlehem Shipbuilding, San Pedro, Los Angeles
- Laid down: 31 October 1943
- Launched: 9 April 1944
- Commissioned: 30 September 1944
- Decommissioned: 3 September 1946
- Recommissioned: 8 July 1952
- Decommissioned: 3 April 1958
- Stricken: 22 October 1971
- Fate: Transferred to Turkey 15 August 1971 (TCG Muavenet (DM-357))

General characteristics
- Class & type: Robert H. Smith-class destroyer
- Displacement: 2,200 tons
- Length: 376 ft 5 in (114.73 m)
- Beam: 40 ft (12 m)
- Draft: 15 ft 8 in (4.78 m)
- Speed: 34 knots (63 km/h; 39 mph)
- Complement: 336 officers and enlisted
- Armament: 6 x 5 in (127 mm)/38 cal. guns; 12 x 40 mm guns; 8 x 20 mm cannons; 2 x depth charge tracks; 4 x depth charge projectors

USS Gwin (DD-772/DM-33/MMD-33) was a Robert H. Smith-class destroyer minelayer in the United States Navy. She was named for William Gwin.

Gwin was launched by the Bethlehem Shipbuilding, San Pedro, Los Angeles on 9 April 1944; sponsored by Mrs. Jesse W. Tarbill, second cousin and sponsor of the previous Gwin (DD-433). The ship was commissioned on 30 September 1944 at Los Angeles.

== Service history ==
=== World War II ===
After shakedown along the California coast, Gwin sailed for the Pacific theatre as flagship of Mine Squadron 3, reaching Pearl Harbor 3 January 1945. A week later the squadron left for the fighting front. At Saipan, 20 January, Gwin and her sister minesweepers joined Battleship Division 7. For 7 days, 21 to 26 January, she participated in the preliminary bombardment of Iwo Jima, next to the last step in the island-hopping campaign across the Pacific. Returning to Pearl Harbor, Gwin underwent overhaul before sailing for Eniwetok, 23 February.

From Eniwetok Gwin steamed to the Ryukyu Islands 17 March to sweep the area around Okinawa. Acting in a variety of roles—antisubmarine screen, radar picket ship, minesweeper, fire support—Gwin was to remain off Okinawa the following five months, almost to the very end of the war. During this period she accounted for some 16 enemy aircraft as the Japanese launched the kamikaze attacks. Nine of these Japanese planes fell victim to Gwin's guns on only two days, 16 April and 4 May. An air raid 16 April saw Gwin down two Mitsubishi G4M "Betty" dive bombers, coming in only to have another come sweeping in and crash in the sea some 25 yards (23 m) as the ship evaded her. An alert gun crew swung their battery to catch another Japanese plane and shoot it down less than 50 yards (46 m) from the ship.

At dusk on 4 May, Gwin was on radar picket station off Okinawa. Combat Air Patrol reported 8 to 10 Japanese planes to port, and Gwin swung her batteries to face the threat. Suddenly a second contingent of planes swept in out of the setting sun to starboard. Gwin swung her guns around and two of the attackers were downed. Whirling to port, the gun crews fired into the original attack group, and accounted for three more kamikazes. The seas had not yet closed over these three planes when a sixth, another kamikaze, crashed into Gwin. Two men were killed, 2 missing, and 11 injured as the plane embedded itself into Gwin's aft gun platform. Then, as damage control parties rushed to quell the fires raging around the kamikaze, the Japanese attack ended as suddenly as it had begun. In less than six minutes, Gwin, although under attack from all quarters, had downed five Japanese planes and been herself damaged by a sixth.

After a brief stay at Ryukyu Islands for battle damage repairs, Gwin returned to patrol and sweeping duties around Okinawa. She rendezvoused 20 August with Task Force 35 and headed for Tokyo Bay. Putting into Sagami Bay 27 August 1945, Gwin began to sweep the area and destroyed some 41 mines in 2 days duty. At last on 29 August 1945 she steamed into Tokyo Bay, and anchored under the towering snowcap of Mount Fuji. Departing for Okinawa 1 September, Gwin, remained on minesweeping duty there and in the East China Sea for the rest of the year.

=== Reserve ===
With her share of the Pacific "mopping-up" complete, Gwin at last headed home, reaching San Pedro, Los Angeles on 23 February 1946. The ship then sailed for Charleston, South Carolina, arriving on 14 March. Gwin decommissioned there on 3 September 1946 and was placed in reserve.

=== Reactivated during the Korean War ===
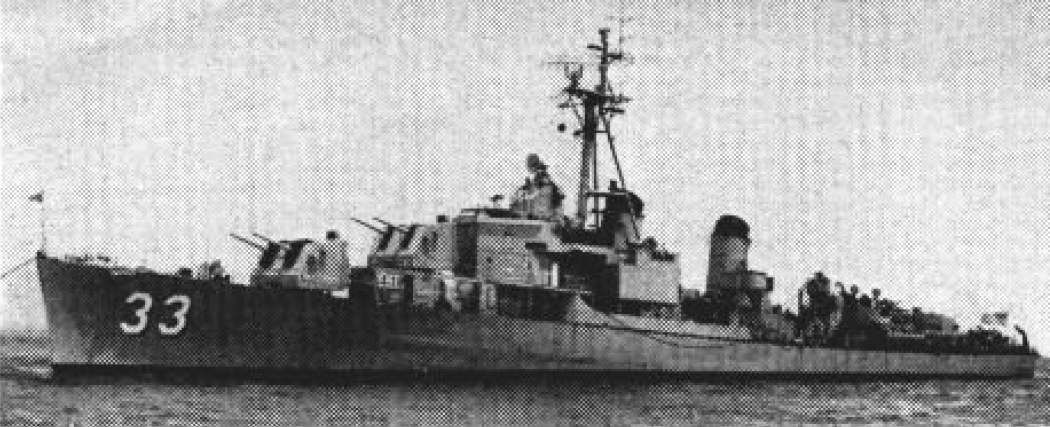
USS Gwin in the mid-1950s.

As the Korean War necessitated the strengthening of America's fleet, Gwin recommissioned at Charleston 8 July 1952. For the next few years she divided her time between Caribbean and local exercises, European cruises, and NATO maneuvers, with time out for overhaul. In 1953 Gwin crossed the Atlantic for a 4-month tour of duty with the 6th Fleet, visiting ten Mediterranean ports before returning to Charleston 3 February 1954. Midshipman Able Cruises June to August 1954 and 1955 took her to Lisbon, Portugal, Le Havre, Valencia, Spain, and Torquay, England. Gwin returned to the Mediterranean a final time in 1957 for NATO maneuvers with ships of the Portuguese, French, and British navies, visiting both Brest and Gibraltar.

In between Caribbean and Mediterranean cruises and training, Gwin engaged in a variety of minesweeping and hunter-killer antisubmarine exercises along the East Coast and participated in several other NATO maneuvers in American waters. Gwin sailed to the Philadelphia Navy Yard 12 January 1958 where she decommissioned 3 April 1958 and remained in reserve through 1967.

=== Transfer to Turkey ===
Transferred to the Turkish Navy on 15 August 1971 and renamed TCG Muavenet (DM-357); severely damaged by firing of two Sea Sparrow missiles by USS Saratoga on 2 October 1992 during NATO Exercise Display Determination 92; 5 crew killed, 19 crew injured. The ship was struck in 1993 and broken up for scrap.

== Awards ==
Gwin received a Navy Unit Commendation and four battle stars for service in World War II.
